= List of Jamaican writers =

This is a list of Jamaican writers, including writers either from or associated with Jamaica.

== A ==
- Peter Abrahams (1919–2017)
- Opal Palmer Adisa (born 1954)
- Lester Afflick (1956–2000)

== B ==
- Amy Bailey (1895–1990)
- Gwyneth Barber Wood (died 2006)
- Mary Anne Barker (1831–1911)
- Lindsay Barrett (born 1941)
- Richard Bathurst (died 1762)
- Edward Baugh (1936–2023)
- Vera Bell (1906–?)
- Louise Bennett-Coverley (1919–2006)
- James Berry (1924–2017)
- Jacqueline Bishop (living)
- Eliot Bliss (1903–1990)
- Cedella Booker (1926–2008)
- Jean "Binta" Breeze (1956–2021)
- Yvonne Brewster (born 1938)
- Anne Brodbelt (1751–1827)
- Erna Brodber (born 1940)

== C ==
- Lady Colin Campbell (born 1949)
- Hazel Campbell (1940–2018)
- Morris Cargill (1914–2000)
- Margaret Cezair-Thompson (living)
- Colin Channer (born 1963)
- Michelle Cliff (1946–2016)
- Aston Cooke (1958–2019)
- Carolyn Cooper (born 1950)
- Rudolph de Cordova (1860–1941)
- Christine Craig (born 1943)

== D ==
- Robert Charles Dallas (1754–1824)
- Kwame Dawes (born 1962)
- Neville Dawes (1926–1984)
- Jean D'Costa (born 1937)
- H. G. de Lisser (1878–1944)
- Ferdinand Dennis (born 1956)
- Nicole Dennis-Benn (born 1982)
- Marcia Douglas (living)

== E ==
- Beverley East (born 1953)
- George Ellis (1753–1815)

== F ==
- Alfred Fagon (1937–1986)
- Ira Lunan Ferguson (1904–1992)
- Walter Augustus Feurtado (1839–1910)
- John Figueroa (1920–1999)
- Honor Ford-Smith (born 1951)

== G ==
- Amy Jacques Garvey (1895–1973)
- Delores Gauntlett (living)
- Barbara Gloudon (1935–2022)
- Lorna Goodison (born 1947)
- Colin Grant (born 1961)

== H ==
- Richard Hart (1917–2013)
- John Hearne (1926–1994)
- A. L. Hendriks (1922–1992)
- Donald Hinds (1934–2023)
- Nalo Hopkinson (born 1960)
- Ishion Hutchinson (born 1983)

== J ==
- Marlon James (born 1970)
- Evan Jones (1927–2023)

== L ==
- Olive Lewin (1927–2013)
- Heather Little-White (1952–2013)
- Edward Long (1734–1813)

== M ==
- Thomas MacDermot (1870–1933)
- Claude McKay (1889–1948)
- Alecia McKenzie (living)
- Kellie Magnus (born 1970)
- Roger Mais (1905–1955)
- Rachel Manley (born 1955)
- Louis Marriott (1935—2016)
- Una Marson (1905–1965)
- Brian Meeks (born 1953)
- Kara Miller (living)
- Kei Miller (born 1978)
- Pamela Mordecai (born 1942)
- Mervyn Morris (born 1937)
- Mutabaruka (born 1952)

== O ==
- Oku Onuora (born 1952)

== P ==
- Kayla Perrin (born 1970?)
- Geoffrey Philp (born 1958)
- Velma Pollard (1937–2025)
- Patricia Powell (born 1966)

== Q ==
- Ada Quayle (1920–2002)

== R ==
- Claudia Rankine (born 1963)
- Barry Reckord (1926–2011)
- Victor Stafford Reid (1913–1987)
- Trevor Rhone (1940–2009)
- Joan Riley (born 1958)
- Kim Robinson-Walcott (born 1956)
- Namba Roy (1910–1961)

== S ==
- Andrew Salkey (1928–1995)
- Dennis Scott (1939–1991)
- Mary Seacole (1805–1881)
- Olive Senior (born 1941)
- Tanya Shirley (born 1976)
- Makeda Silvera (born 1955)
- Joanne M. Simpson (born 1957)
- Malachi Smith (living)
- Mikey Smith (1954–1983)
- Vanessa Spence (born 1961)

== T ==
- Ekwueme Michael Thelwell (born 1939)
- Elean Thomas (1947–2004)
- Ralph Thompson (1928–2022)

== V ==
- Vivian Virtue (1911–1998)

== W ==
- Robert Wedderburn (1762–1835/36?)
- Anthony C. Winkler (1942–2015)
- Sylvia Wynter (born 1928)

== Z ==
- Fiona Zedde (born 1976)

== See also ==
- Jamaican literature
