= Jamaican literature =

Literature in Jamaica

Jamaican literature is internationally renowned, with the island of Jamaica being the home or birthplace of many important authors. One of the most distinctive aspects of Jamaican literature is its use of the local dialect — a variation of English, the country's official language. Known to Jamaicans as "patois", and now sometimes described as "nation language", this creole has become an important element in Jamaican fiction, poetry and theater.

Notable writers and intellectuals from elsewhere in the Caribbean region studied at the University of the West Indies in Kingston, including St. Lucian Nobel Prize-winner, Derek Walcott, the late Guyanese historian and scholar Walter Rodney, and Grenadian poet and short story writer Merle Collins.

== Folk beginnings ==
The tradition of storytelling in Jamaica is a long one, beginning with folktales told by the slaves during the colonial period. Jamaica's folk stories are most closely associated with those of the Ashanti tribe in West Africa, from which many of the slaves originated. Some European tales were also brought to the island by immigrants, particularly those from the United Kingdom. In folktales, the local speech style is particularly necessary. It infuses humor into the stories, and is an integral part of the retelling.

Perhaps the most popular character in Jamaican tales, Anancy (also spelled Anansi, 'Nancy Spida, and Brer Nansi) is an African spider-god who makes an appearance in tales throughout the Caribbean region. He is a trickster god, and in his stories he often goes against other animal-god characters, like Tiger and Donkey. These tales are thought to be one way the slaves told about outsmarting their owners as well.

== Development of the literature ==
Jamaican Thomas MacDermot (1870–1933) is credited with fostering the creation of Jamaican literature. According to critic Michael Hughes, MacDermot was "probably the first Jamaican writer to assert the claim of the West Indies to a distinctive place within English-speaking culture," and his Becka's Buckra Baby as the beginning of modern Caribbean literature.

Jamaican-born Claude McKay (1889–1948) is credited with inspiring France's Negritude (“Blackness”) movement, as well as being a founding father of the Harlem Renaissance. Having established himself as a poet in Jamaica, he moved to the U.S. in his 20s and proceeded to travel to France, but never returned to his birthplace.

Una Marson (1905–1965) was well known for her poetry, as well as her activism as a feminist, and for her role as producer of the BBC literary radio programme Caribbean Voices in the 1940s. Louise Bennett-Coverley (1919–2006) was a Jamaican poet and folklorist celebrated for her unique voice as "Miss Lou". Writing and performing her poems in Jamaican patois, Bennett was instrumental in having this "dialect" of the people given literary recognition in its own right ("nation language"). Other Jamaican writers who have gained international acclaim include Hazel Dorothy Campbell (1940–2018), Mikey Smith (1954–1983) and Linton Kwesi Johnson. In 2014, Mervyn Morris was appointed Poet Laureate of Jamaica. He was succeeded in 2017 by Lorna Goodison.

== Notable Jamaican writers ==
- Opal Palmer Adisa, writer, poet, performance artist
- Lindsay Barrett, poet, novelist, journalist
- Edward Baugh, poet and scholar
- Louise Bennett-Coverley, poet, folklorist, actress, educator
- James Berry, poet, anthologist
- Eliot Bliss, novelist and poet
- Jonathan Braham, novelist
- Erna Brodber, novelist, poet
- Margaret Cezair-Thompson
- Colin Channer, novelist, short-story writer
- Kwame Dawes, poet, critic
- Jean D'Costa, novelist, scholar
- Herbert de Lisser, journalist and author
- Ferdinand Dennis, novelist, journalist and broadcaster
- Nicole Dennis-Benn, novelist
- Marcia Douglas, novelist, poet, performer
- Gloria Escoffery, painter, poet and art critic
- Esther Figueroa, novelist, environmental activist, filmmaker
- John Figueroa, poet, educator
- Honor Ford-Smith, actress, playwright, scholar and poet
- Ifeona Fulani, novelist, educator
- Lorna Goodison, poet
- John Hearne, novelist, journalist and teacher
- A. L. Hendriks, poet and critic
- Nalo Hopkinson, science fiction writer
- Marlon James, novelist
- Evan Jones, playwright, screenwriter, poet, novelist
- Linton Kwesi Johnson, poet
- Barbara Lalla, novelist, scholar
- Thomas MacDermot, poet, novelist and editor
- Roger Mais, novelist
- Rachel Manley, memoirist, poet
- Una Marson, poet, playwright
- Shara McCallum, poet, essayist
- Diana McCaulay, novelist, short story writer, environmental activist
- Claude McKay, poet and novelist
- Anthony McNeill, poet
- Una Marson, poet, playwright, journalist
- Kei Miller, poet, novelist, short story writer, essayist
- Pamela Mordecai, poet, novelist, short story writer
- Mervyn Morris, poet, scholar, essayist
- Mutabaruka, poet
- Rex Nettleford, scholar, social critic
- Cyril Palmer, writer
- Orlando Patterson, historical and cultural sociologist
- Geoffrey Philp, poet, novelist, playwright
- Velma Pollard, poet, novelist, short story writer
- Patricia Powell, novelist
- Claudia Rankine, poet, playwright
- V. S. Reid, novelist
- Trevor Rhone, playwright and film maker
- Leopold Anthony Richards, scholar, educator, author
- Leone Ross, novelist, short story writer, journalist
- Heather Royes, poet
- Gillian Royes, novelist
- Andrew Salkey, novelist, poet
- Dennis Scott, poet, playwright
- Olive Senior, poet, novelist, short story writer
- Tanya Shirley, poet, scholar
- M. G. Smith, poet
- Mikey Smith, poet
- Ralph Thompson, poet
- Anthony C. Winkler, novelist
- Sylvia Wynter, novelist, dramatist, critic, essayist
- Kerry Young, novelist

== See also ==
- List of Jamaican writers
