= List of Jamaican women writers =

This is a list of Jamaican women writers, including women writers either from or associated with Jamaica.

== A ==
- Opal Palmer Adisa (born 1954)
- Louisa Wells Aikman (1755–1831)

== B ==
- Amy Bailey (1895–1990)
- Gwyneth Barber Wood (died 2006)
- Mary Anne Barker (1831–1911)
- Vera Bell (1906–?)
- Louise Bennett-Coverley (1919–2006)
- Jacqueline Bishop (living)
- Emily Rose Bleby (1849–1917)
- Eliot Bliss (1903–1990)
- Cedella Booker (1926–2008)
- Jean "Binta" Breeze (1956–2021)
- Yvonne Brewster (born 1938)
- Erna Brodber (born 1940)
- Beverley Bryan (born 1949)

== C ==
- Hazel Campbell (1940–2018)
- Lady Colin Campbell (born 1949)
- Margaret Cezair-Thompson (living)
- Michelle Cliff (1946–2016)
- Carolyn Cooper (born 1950)
- Christine Craig (born 1943)

== D ==
- Jean D'Costa (born 1937)
- Nicole Dennis-Benn (born 1982)

== E ==
- Beverley East (born 1953)

== F ==
- Honor Ford-Smith (born 1951)

== G ==
- Amy Jacques Garvey (1895–1973)
- Delores Gauntlett (born 1949)
- Lorna Goodison (born 1947)

== H ==
- Nalo Hopkinson (born 1960)

== L ==
- Andrea Levy (1956–2019)
- Olive Lewin (1927–2013)
- Heather Little-White (1952–2013)

== M ==
- Alecia McKenzie (living)
- Kellie Magnus (born 1970)
- Rachel Manley (born 1955)
- Una Marson (1905–1965)
- Kara Miller (living)
- Tonya R. Moore (living)
- Pamela Mordecai (born 1942)
- Heather Joan Mclean(living)

== P ==
- Kayla Perrin (born 1970?)
- Velma Pollard (1937–2025)
- Patricia Powell (born 1966)
- Helen Pyne-Timothy (1937–2015)

== Q ==
- Ada Quayle (1920–2002)

== R ==
- Claudia Rankine (born 1963)
- Joan Riley (born 1958)
- Kim Robinson-Walcott (born 1956)
- Heather Royes (born 1943)

== S ==
- Stephanie Saulter (living)
- Mary Seacole (1805–1881)
- Olive Senior (born 1941)
- Verene Shepherd (born 1951)
- Tanya Shirley (born 1976)
- Makeda Silvera (born 1955)
- Vanessa Spence (born 1961)
- Clarine Stephenson

== T ==
- Elean Thomas (1947–2004)

== W ==
- Sylvia Wynter (born 1928)

== Z ==
- Fiona Zedde (born 1976)

== See also ==
- List of women writers
