= Jean "Binta" Breeze =

Jamaican dub poet and storyteller (1956–2021)

Jean "Binta" Breeze MBE
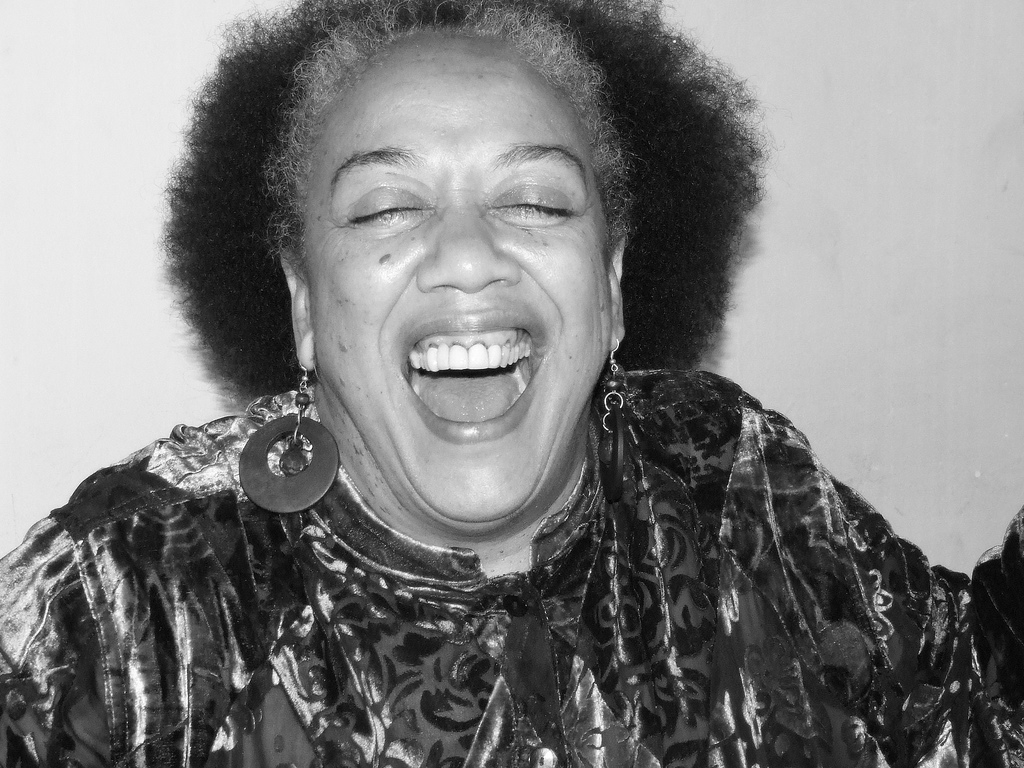
- Breeze pictured in 2007
- Born: Jean Lumsden; 11 March 1956; Hanover, Jamaica
- Died: 4 August 2021 (aged 65); Sandy Bay, Jamaica
- Occupations: Writer, dub poet
- Known for: First Jamaican female dub poet
- Notable work: Riddym Ravings and Other Poems (1988)
- Spouse(s): Brian Breese (m. 1974); Simon Featherstone (m. 1998)
- Children: 3, including Gareth

Jean "Binta" Breeze MBE (11 March 1956 – 4 August 2021) was a Jamaican dub poet and storyteller, acknowledged as the first woman to write and perform dub poetry. She worked also as a theatre director, choreographer, actor, and teacher. She performed her work around the world, in the Caribbean, North America, Europe, South-East Asia, and Africa, and has been called "one of the most important, influential performance poets of recent years".

== Biography ==
Born as Jean Lumsden in rural Jamaica, to a mixed-race couple, she grew up in Patty Hill, a small village in the hills of Hanover Parish, and for a time was raised by her grandmother and great-aunt while her parents were studying and working. She attended Rusea's High School, taking A-levels in Spanish, geography and English literature, and soon after leaving in 1974, she married Brian Breese, a Welsh teacher whose name she would later adapt to Breeze. She began teaching at the local Little London high school while also working for the Jamaica Cultural Development Commission, planning local events for the Jamaican festival, held in August each year.

She moved to Kingston in 1978, after her marriage ended, and studied for a year at the Jamaican School of Drama, where she met Michael Smith and Oku Onuora. She then lived for three and a half years in the Clarendon hills as a member of the Rastafarian religion, also becoming an early participant in the Sistren Theatre Collective, campaigning to advance gender equality. She went on to become known as Jamaica's first female dub poet after she performed onstage in 1981 with Mutabaruka, who recorded her work, including her on the compilation album Word Sound 'ave Power performing "Aid Travels with a Bomb" and "To Plant or Not to Plant". She first visited London early in 1985, at the invitation of Linton Kwesi Johnson, to make her debut UK performance at the International Book Fair of Radical Black and Third World Books on 19 March that year. Returning to London in September 1985, she earned a certificate of education at Garnett College (1987), taught Theatre Studies at Brixton College, but left after two years of teaching in order to be able to perform full-time.

She wrote in various media. Her first book of poetry, Riddym Ravings, was published in 1988 by the Race Today Collective, with the title poem, also known as "The Mad Woman's Poem", being described by Linton Kwesi Johnson as "a classic in contemporary Caribbean poetry" and featuring in Margaret Busby's 1992 anthology Daughters of Africa. Breeze appeared on Channel 4's New Voices series in 1988, and went on to write the screenplay for Hallelujah Anyhow, a co-production of the British Film Institute screened at the British Film Festival in 1990. Her work was featured on Channel 4's series Bandung File in a 1990 documentary called "Moods and Moments". She also released several albums, contributing to Woman's Talk (1986), and recording Tracks in 1991 with Dennis Bovell's Dub Band.

Among her later collections are The Arrival of Brighteye and Other Poems (2000), which includes a Brixton Market version of Chaucer's "The Wife of Bath's Tale", The Fifth Figure (2006), about five generations of black British women, and Third World Girl: Selected Poems (2011).

Her theatrical appearances included leading roles, in 1987, in Edgar White's play The Moon Dance Night, and in Ntozake Shange's The Love Space Demands in 1992, for Talawa Theatre Company, directed by Yvonne Brewster, who also directed her in One Love by Kwame Dawes (Bristol Old Vic, 2001), as well as appearing in other productions such as The Prayer, directed by Michael Buffong at the Young Vic in 2000, and Geraldine Connor's Carnival Messiah at the West Yorkshire Playhouse in 2001.

She had schizophrenia from her early 20s and wrote poetry about what she herself called "madness". In April 2006, on the BBC Radio programme The Interview, Breeze gave her perspective on mental illness and advocated increased attention to the needs of people with schizophrenia who may not be given as much leeway as someone with a "talent" like hers.

She presented her work throughout the world, including tours performing in the Caribbean (notably at Jamaica's Calabash International Literary Festival), North America, Europe, South East Asia, and Africa, and was once described as a "one-woman festival". In her later years she lived between Leicester in England and Jamaica. On the publication of her collection The Verandah Poems, released in March 2016 to mark her 60th birthday, Breeze explained its origin to David Katz in an interview for Caribbean Beat magazine: "I got very ill in England....As a matter of fact, I had two strokes and was in a coma for five days. So I decided to come and spend a year in Jamaica, to just get better. And when I came home, I spent all of my time sitting on the verandah, and I thought, why not write some verandah poems?"

== Personal life ==
Born Jean Lumsden, she married Brian Breese in 1974 (adapting his surname to Breeze) and the couple had a son, before the marriage ended in 1978. Her son Gareth became a West Indies cricketer. She also had two daughters, Imega and Caribe. She married Simon Feathestone in 1998.

Explaining her nickname, Breeze said in a 2009 interview:

In the seventies in Jamaica when we were all beginning to chant in Kingston, we all chose African names. I told my friends: "I want one that I can spell and pronounce!" One day a friend of mine, who is a famous comedian now, called Blakka, came to me and told me he found a name suited for me: Binta. When I asked him what it meant, he replied: "Close to the heart." Now when I came to England, I met some Irish people and they told me in Ireland bint means "young girl" or "prostitute". Then I went to South-Africa and one of the tribal people over there told me in their culture a binta was a kind of a bag to travel with. In West-Africa binta is a popular name derived from Arabic and meaning "daughter of", so these days I say I'm Jean, daughter of the breeze!

Breeze died on 4 August 2021 of chronic obstructive pulmonary disease at her home in Sandy Bay, Jamaica. Michael Rosen, who had appeared along with Breeze at the Ledbury Poetry Festival, paid tribute to her by saying: "Her poetry and performance was an announcement about womanhood, ethnicity, colour, nationhood and in particular Jamaica." Carolyn Cooper wrote in The Jamaica Gleaner:

Breeze has left a legacy of poems, short stories, scripts for theatre and film as well as numerous recordings of her vibrant performances that will, indeed, endure. Her exceptional body of work confirms her place as a major figure in Caribbean literature. From the sturdy roots of dub poetry, Breeze branched out into other literary genres. But she never forgot the power of performance that is such a fundamental element of dub poetry.

Actress Doña Croll was Breeze's distant cousin.

== Archives ==
The Bloodaxe Books Archive in Newcastle University's Special Collections and Archives holds a Jean "Binta" Breeze collection. It consists of letters and proofs relating to her published poetry works.

== Honours and recognition ==
In 2003, Breeze was awarded a NESTA Fellowship of two years, to be held in Cambridge.

In 2004, she featured in the photograph "A Great Day in London" taken at the British Library of 50 Black and Asian writers who have made major contributions to British literature.

She was an Honorary Creative Writing Fellow at the School of English, University of Leicester.

Breeze was appointed Member of the Order of the British Empire (MBE) in the 2012 Queen's Birthday Honours, for services to literature.

In August 2018, Breeze's poem "dreamer" was among those by six poets (the others being James Berry, Kwame Dawes, Lorna Goodison, Grace Nichols, and Andrew Salkey) that were displayed on the London Underground in a set entitled "Windrush 70, A Celebration of Caribbean poetry" to commemorate the 70th anniversary of the arrival in Britain of the ship Empire Windrush from Jamaica in June 1948, which marked the beginning of the most significant West Indian post-World War II migration.

In 2018, Breeze received an honorary Doctor of Letters degree from the University of Leicester, a Lifetime Achievement Award from the Jamaican Poetry Festival, and a silver Musgrave Medal from the Institute of Jamaica.

== Works ==
=== Books of poetry ===
- Answers (Masani Productions, 1983)
- Riddym Ravings and Other Poems (Race Today Publications, 1988, ISBN 9780947716141), edited by Mervyn Morris
- Spring Cleaning (Virago Press, 1992, ISBN 9781853812538)
- On the Edge of an Island (Bloodaxe Books, 1997, ISBN 9781852244057)
- Song Lines (Gecko Press, 1997, ISBN 978-0952406785)
- The Arrival of Brighteye and Other Poems (Bloodaxe Books, 2000, ISBN 9781852245382)
- The Fifth Figure (Bloodaxe Books, 2006, ISBN 9781852247324)
- Third World Girl: Selected Poems (Bloodaxe Books, 2011, ISBN 9781852249106), with live performances DVD
- Third World Girl: Selected Poems (Bloodaxe Books, 2016, ISBN 9781780372853)

=== Albums ===
- Riddym Ravings (1987), ROIR
- Tracks (1991), LKJ Records
- Hearsay (1994), 57 Productions
- Riding on de Riddym (1997), 57 Productions
- Eena Me Corner (2010), Arroyo Rec.
