= Oku Onuora =

Jamaican dub poet (born 1952)

Oku Nagba Ozala Onuora
- Born: Orlando Wong; 9 March 1952 (age 74); Kingston, Colony of Jamaica, British Empire
- Occupations: Writer, dub poet and performer
- Writing career
- Genres: Poetry, drama

Oku Nagba Ozala Onuora (born Orlando Wong, 9 March 1952), known as the "father of Jamaican dub poetry" is a Jamaican dub poet and performer.

== Biography ==
Orlando Wong was born in Kingston, Jamaica, in 1952. He grew up in the slums of Eastern Kingston's Franklin Town and received an informal education from a Rastafarian named Negus. Wong's rebellious nature initially led him to engage in demonstrations against police violence and painting slogans on walls.

When a project to provide a ghetto school and community centre to benefit the area's youths hit financial difficulties, Wong began engaging in guerrilla activities, based in the hills around Kingston, including armed robberies. After one of these robberies, of a post office, Wong was captured and sentenced to 15 years' imprisonment in 1970. After attempting to escape twice (he was shot five times by the police during the first attempt), instigating a prison riot, and campaigning for prison reform, Wong was classed as a security risk and subjected to a harsh regime at the Fort Augusta Prison.

He began writing poetry in 1971, and became the first inmate to be allowed to perform with a reggae band in 1974 when Cedric Brooks' band The Light of Saba performed in the prison. After the performance, however, Wong's poetry was declared "subversive" and his writing was confiscated from his cell. He considered himself a political prisoner, and continued writing, with his poetry finding an audience in the outside world after being smuggled out of prison, coming to the attention of Jamaican writers, especially UWI Professor Mervyn Morris. Wong's poetry also won three prizes in the 1976 Jamaica Literary Festival. His profile was further raised when he was allowed out of prison for a poetry reading at the Tom Redcam Library in 1977. Also in 1977, several of his poems were published in Jamaica's national newspapers, including the Daily Gleaner and Jamaica Daily News. His play Confrontation was performed on JBC radio, and Morris arranged for the publication of his first collection of poetry, ECHO by Sangsters (1978).

Well-known literary and cultural personalities, and students at the University of the West Indies, through the Human Rights Council & the Prisoners Rehabilitation Committee, campaigned for his release, which was achieved on 1 September 1977, when he received the equivalent of a presidential pardon from then Attorney General Carl Rattray, a poet himself.

After his release, he was granted a scholarship to the Jamaica School of Drama, although he dropped out after a year. In 1978, he and fellow dub poet Mikey Smith performed at the 11th World Festival of Youth and Students in Cuba, where he came to the attention of Lillian Allen; the performance inspired her to start the dub poetry scene back in Canada.

Onuora married Adugo (née Phyllis Ranglin) in 1978, for which he had a name change, the name being chosen by his bride-to-be (who did not want to be identified as Mrs. Wong) with the help of an Afrikan Professor Umona. Their names were chosen from the Igbo language from the southeastern region of Nigeria. "Oku" means Fire / Light which burns oppression, while "Onuora" means voice of the people. His full name, Oku Nagba Ozala Onuora, translates as everlasting fire or light which burns oppression. Together with Adugo, Onuora founded the "Prugresiv Aartis Muvmant".

The "Reflections in Red" single was his first musical release, and the first Jamaican dub poetry record, recorded with the backing of Wailers rhythm section Aston and Carlton Barrett at Tuff Gong studios and released in 1979 on Bob Marley's "56 Hope Road" label. The poem expressed his scepticism over the peace truce between Kingston's rival gangs, although he went on to perform at the One Love Peace Concert that celebrated the truce. ECHO, Onuora's first poetry collection, has been reprinted several times with some five editions, some translated into French/patois and one edition in German. Onuora toured Europe extensively, forming a friendship with Linton Kwesi Johnson, and released his first album, Pressure Drop, which featured several poems from ECHO, in France on the Blue Moon Music label and in the US on Heartbeat Records in 1986. He toured the United States and France with his AK7 (Armageddon Knights Column 7) band performing at the prestigious Angoulême Jazz Festival in France.

Onuora concentrated on writing plays and directing drama for the latter half of the 1980s and early 1990s, but subsequently returned to poetry and music and recorded several instrumental dub albums, working with musician Courtney Panton. Onuora ceased to be involved in music in the 1990s due to what he called "negative elements" taking over.

In 2010, Onuora announced a new album, entitled A Movement, and his intention to return to live performance. The album was released in May 2013, featuring pianist Monty Alexander and Sly and Robbie, and is a tribute to his wife Adugo Ranglin-Onuora, who died in July 2011.

== Discography ==
- Pressure Drop (1984), Blue Moon – Oku Onuora & AK7, later reissued by Heartbeat
- New Jerusalem Dub (1991), ROIR
- I a Tell Dubwise and Otherwise (1993), ROIR
- Dubbin Away (1999), ROIR
- Overdub: Tribute to King Tubby (2000), ION
- Bus Out
- A Movement (2013), Music Art Network
- I've Seen (2019), Fruits Records
