= Collegiate School (Jamaica) =

School in Kingston, Jamaica

Collegiate School was a secondary school for boys that operated from 1853 (173 years ago) until 1902 (124 years ago) in Kingston, Jamaica. Herbert George de Lisser went to the school while it was headed by William Morrison. Andrew J. Milne was also a headmaster at the school. Laurence R. Fyfe went to Collegiate.
