= Peter Ashbourne =

Jamaican musician

Peter Ashbourne CD (born 14 July 1950) is a Jamaican musician and composer who has worked in classical music, jazz, and popular forms such as reggae, sometimes with his group The Peter Ashbourne Affair and more recently with the jazz band Ashes.

== Biography ==
Born in Kingston, Ashbourne attended the Jamaica School of Music and the University of the West Indies before graduating with a bachelor's degree in composition and arranging from the Berklee College of Music in Boston. He is a licentiate of the Royal Schools of Music in violin.

In a long career, Ashbourne has worked in both classical and popular music. He has worked on the national pantomime and has written music for the American Wind Symphony Orchestra. In 2012 he worked on Jamaica's 50th anniversary celebrations, acted as musical director of the popular Digicel Stars talent show and other major events, and conducted the Royal Philharmonic Orchestra at their two performances in Jamaica, which included performances of original music composed by Ashbourne. He played piano on Eric Donaldson's 1971 hit "Cherry Oh Baby", and provided string arrangements for Beres Hammond's 1976 album Soul Reggae. As a writer, arranger, and producer he has also worked with other popular musicians including Ernie Smith, Tarrus Riley, Cedric Brooks, and Burning Spear.

He released the album Blind Man Swimming in 2001.

Ashbourne wrote the opera Mikey, based on the life of dub poet Mikey Smith, which premiered in 2012.

In 2012 he was awarded the Order of Distinction - Commander Class (CD) by the Jamaican Government in recognition of his "dedicated and outstanding service to the development of many genres of music in Jamaica".

He is currently a faculty member at the School of Music at the Edna Manley College of the Visual and Performing Arts, and a director of the MUSIC Unites Jamaica Foundation.

== Discography ==
- Blind Man Swimming (2001)
