= Jamaica Times =

The Jamaica Times was a literary newspaper for literature from Jamaica and the Caribbean. The author Thomas MacDermot (aka Tom Redcam) was the editor from 1900 to 1920 and was an assistant before that, and the author Herbert George de Lisser was an editor for several years starting in 1889. It was a weekly paper primarily for teachers and ministers but also for a wide spectrum of the middle classes.

== Editors ==
- Herbert George de Lisser, 1889
- Thomas MacDermot, 1900–1920
