= Calabash International Literary Festival =

Literary festival in Jamaica

- Genre: Literary
- Frequency: Biennial
- Venue: Jakes
- Locations: Treasure Beach, Jamaica
- Founded: 2001; 25 years ago
- Founders: Colin Channer, Kwame Dawes and Justine Henzell
- Website: calabashfestival.org/info

The Calabash International Literary Festival, inaugurated in Jamaica in 2001, is a three-day festival that was held annually for its first decade, before being staged on a biennial basis on even years, until 2018. With the 2020 and 2022 festivals having to be cancelled due to the COVID-19 pandemic, 2023 is scheduled to mark the festival's return for its 15th staging. The scope of Calabash encompasses "readings and music with other forms of storytelling folded in the mix".

== History ==
The co-founders of Calabash in 2001 were novelist Colin Channer, poet Kwame Dawes and producer Justine Henzell, three Jamaicans with the aim of creating a literary festival "with roots in Jamaica and branches reaching out into the wider world". Channer resigned at the end of 2010, saying in his explanation: "The ultimate goal of leadership must never be its own survival, but to become obsolete. I am glad this time has come."

After taking place for 10 successive years, between 2001 and 2010, Calabash was then held on a biennial basis on even years.

In 2014, there was a larger international content, including leading literary figures and musicians, and the 2016 incarnation of the festival was described as "an affirmation of the steady movement towards an unfolding of a vision of something that began modestly, but full of hope and giddy ambition 15 years ago".

Now acknowledged as "a world-class literary festival", Calabash takes place in the village of Treasure Beach on Jamaica's south coast. Among the international authors who have participated are Salman Rushdie, Zadie Smith, Jamaica Kincaid, Colum McCann, Wole Soyinka, Derek Walcott, Junot Díaz, Michael Ondaatje, Elizabeth Alexander, Russell Banks, Edwidge Danticat, Chimamanda Ngozi Adichie, Caryl Phillips, Linton Kwesi Johnson, Chigozie Obioma, Tishani Doshi, Mervyn Morris, Kei Miller, Marlon James, Eleanor Catton, Evan Jones, and many others.

An anthology entitled Much Things to Say: 100 Poets from the First Ten Years of the Calabash International Literary Festival was published in 2010.

In 2021, the Calabash festival won the Madam C.J. Walker Award from the Hurston/Wright Foundation.

Following cancellations due to the COVID-19 pandemic, the festival was scheduled to relaunch in May 2023.

The 2023 festival took place from Friday, May 26, to Sunday, May 28, and participants included Kei Miller, Kevin Jared Hosein, Padma Lakshmi, Linton Kwesi Johnson, Margaret Busby, and Taiye Selasi. As described in Town & Country magazine, it was "a spectacular, colorful three-day celebration of words, life, and endurance through literature, music, and conversation. The gathering of locals from across the island and international guests—Angelina Jolie was in the audience this year—is notable for the energizing and cleansing effect of storytelling; its programming emphasizes harmony, joy, and empathy in a place where stories, music, and laughter are mainstays even after centuries of deep-seated trauma."

The dates for the 2025 festival were announced as 23–25 May.
