= Poet Laureate of Jamaica =

Honorary position in Jamaica

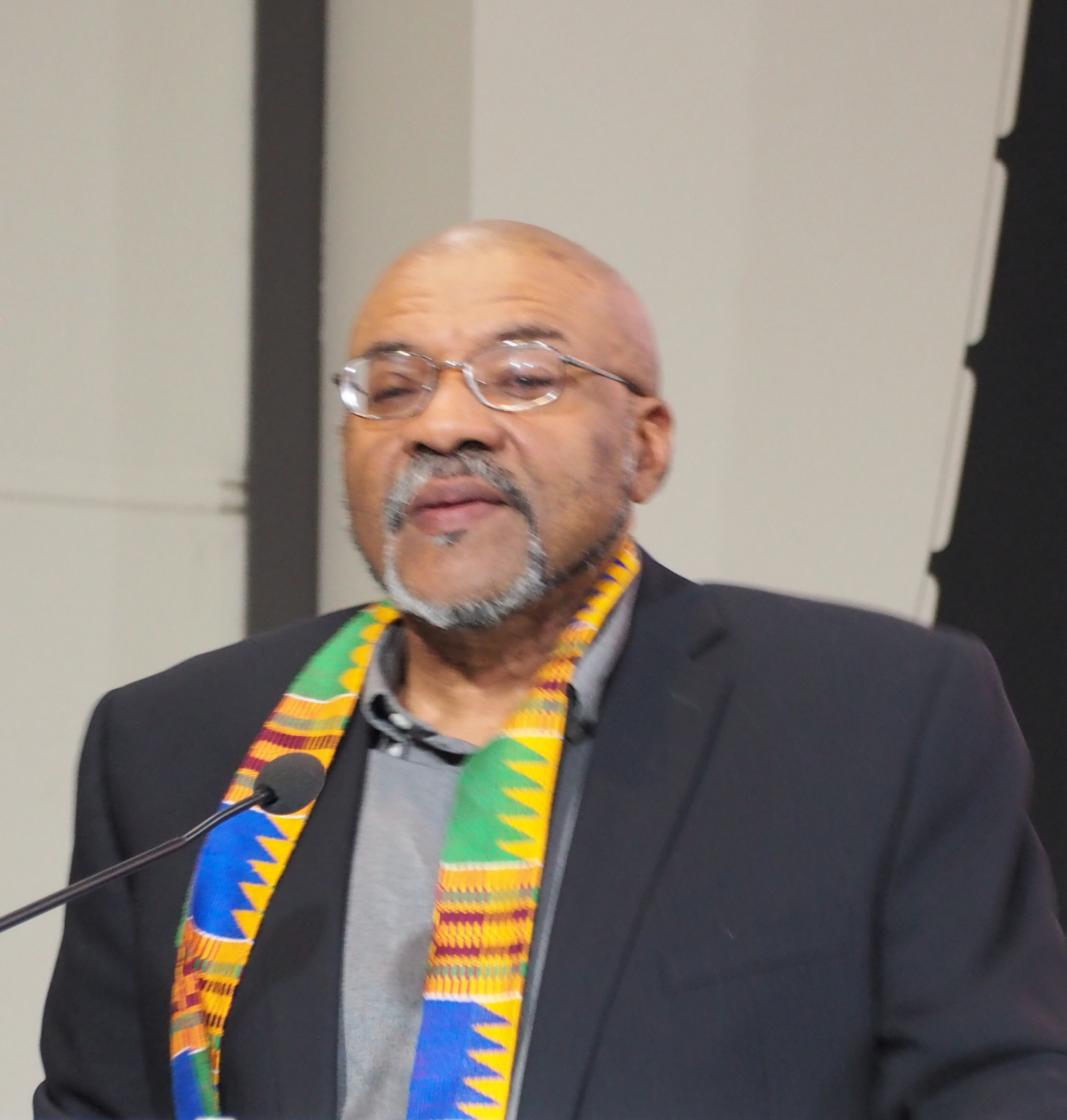
- Incumbent; Kwame Dawes since 2024
- Appointer: National Library of Jamaica
- Term length: Three years
- Formation: 1933; re-established 2014
- Website: nlj.gov.jm/poetlaureate/

The Poet Laureateship of Jamaica is an honorary position in Jamaica, used from 1933 to 1962 and again since 2014, when it was re-established.

== History ==
The first poet laureateship of Jamaica was established when the honour was posthumously awarded to Thomas MacDermot in October 1933. The title was initially bestowed by the Poetry League Society of Jamaica, founded by J. E. Clare McFarlane (later the second laureate) in September 1923 as a branch of the British Empire Poetry League. The National Poetry Society of Jamaica named only two poets laureate before the title fell into disuse in 1962 with Jamaica's independence. Claude McKay was also styled a poet laureate before 1962, though according to the National Library of Jamaica (NLJ) this was an unofficial designation.

The award was re-established in 2014, this time under the auspices of NLJ and as a national honour, with governmental and parliamentary approval. In April of that year, the first poet laureate, Mervyn Morris, was inaugerated; the position has since been occupied by three other Jamaican poets, each serving for a period of three years. Lorna Goodison served in the post from 2017 to 2020, succeeded in 2021 by Olive Senior, and, as of 2024, Kwame Dawes.

== Selection ==
Poets laureate since 2014 have been selected by blind ballots cast by members of a nine person committee, these are: the chair of the Board of Management of the NLJ, the National Librarian of the NLJ, representative of the Department of Literatures in English of the University of the West Indies, Mona, a representative of the Poetry Society of Jamaica, an executive director of the Institute of Jamaica, a representative of the Jamaica Cultural Development Commission, a representative of the Entertainment Advisory Board, a representative of the Book Industry Association of Jamaica and a representative of the Creative Industries Commission.

== Insignia and ceremony ==
In its first incarnation, poets laureate were crowned with a wreath of Guaiacum officinale leaves as well as robed at their inaugurations, which were held at the Ward Theatre in Kingston.

In its current form, laureates are bestowed with a breast star of sterling silver decorated with gold plating and green enamel, depicting a ring of breadfruit leaves. In the centre is Jamaica's coat of arms in gold surrounded by the words "Poet Laureate of Jamaica" in gold lettering upon black enamel. The star is accompanied by a black sash, which is edged with thin gold and green comparisons. A miniature order in the style of the breast star with a ribbon like that of the sash is also bestowed upon the recipient for wear with white tie.

== Poets laureate ==
Name	Birth and death	Dates of laureateship	Awarded by	Ref.
Thomas MacDermot	1870–1933	October 1933		
J. E. Clare McFarlane	1894–1962	April 7, 1953 – October, 13 1962		
Mervyn Morris	1937–	May 22, 2014 – 2017	Wykeham McNeill	
Lorna Goodison	1947–	May 17, 2017 – 2020	Sir Patrick Allen	
Olive Senior	1941–	March 17, 2021 – 2024	Sir Patrick Allen	
Kwame Dawes	1962–	January 22, 2024 – 2027	Steadman Fuller	
