= Gwyneth Barber Wood =

Gwyneth Barber Wood (died 2006) was a Jamaican travel agent and writer.

== Biography ==
She was born in Kingston, Jamaica. In 2000, she received a bronze medal and merit certificate for two poems from the Jamaica Cultural Development Commission Literary Awards. Wood was a fellow of the Virginia Center for the Creative Arts in 2001 and 2003. She was invited to read at the Calabash International Literary Festival in 2001. Her poetry has appeared in Artemis journal, The Jamaica Observer, The Caribbean Writer and the anthology series Bearing Witness. Her first poetry collection, The Garden of Forgetting, was published in 2005.
