= Cyril Palmer =

Jamaican writer

Cyril Everard Palmer (15 October 1930 – 16 June 2013) was a Jamaican writer.

== Early life ==
Palmer was born on 15 October 1930 in Kendal, Hanover. He attended Kendal Elementary School and became a teacher after graduating from the Kingston-based Mico Teachers' College. Before becoming a writer, Palmer worked as a journalist .

== Career ==
Palmer wrote over fifteen children's books in his lifetime, the last of which being A Time To Say Goodbye (2006). Primarily set in the Jamaican countryside, his children's book received critical acclaim for their "craftsmanship and sympathetic humour". He also wrote an adult novel titled A Broken Vessel (1960).

== Later years and death ==
Palmer emigrated to Canada in 1974, where he remained an active writer and teacher. He died on 16 June 2013 in Mississauga, Canada, and was survived by his wife and their three children.

== Recognition ==
In 1977, for his contributions to Jamaican literature, Palmer was awarded the Certificate of Merit by the Jamaican Reading Association. The same year, he was awarded the Silver Musgrave Medal for Literature from the Institute of Jamaica. In 1999, Canadian High Commissioner praised Palmer for being "the master of the rural Caribbean tale for any readership, adult or juvenile".

== Bibliography ==
- The Adventures of Jimmy Maxwell (1962)
- A Taste of Danger (1963)
- The Cloud with the Silver Lining (1966)
- Big Doc Bitterroot (1968)
- The Sun Salutes You (1970)
- The Hummingbird People (1971)
- A Cow Called Boy (1972)
- The Wooing of Beppo Tate (1972)
- Baba and Mr. Big (1972)
- My Father, Sun-Sun Johnson (1974)
- A Dog Called Houdini (1978)
- Beppo Tate and Roy Penner; The Runaway Marriage Brokers: Two Stories (1980)
- Houdini, Come Home (1981)
- A Time To Say Goodbye (2006)
