= Neville Dawes =

Jamaican writer (1926–1984)

- Born: Neville Augustus Dawes; 16 June 1926; Warri, Nigeria Protectorate, British Empire
- Died: 13 May 1984 (aged 57)
- Education: Oriel College, Oxford
- Occupations: Novelist and poet
- Children: Kwame Dawes

Neville Dawes (16 June 1926 – 13 May 1984) was a novelist and poet born in Nigeria of Jamaican parentage. He was the father of poet and editor Kwame Dawes.

== Biography ==
Neville Augustus Dawes was born in Warri, Nigeria, to Jamaican parents Augustus Dawes (a Baptist missionary and teacher) and his wife Laura, and was raised in rural Jamaica, where the family returned when he was three years old. In 1938, he won a scholarship to Jamaica College and subsequently went up to Oriel College, Oxford, where he read English. After graduating, he went to teach at Calabar High School in Kingston, Jamaica.

Returning to West Africa in 1956, he took up a teaching post at Kumasi Institute of Technology in Ghana. He was subsequently a lecturer in English at the University of Ghana (1960–70). In 1962, he and his Ghanaian wife Sophia, an artist and social worker, had a son Kwame. In 1971, Dawes returned with his family to Jamaica, where he became the executive director of the Institute of Jamaica in Kingston.

He published two novels (The Last Enchantment and Interim) and a poetry collection, as well as short stories and essays, some of which were broadcast on the BBC radio programme Caribbean Voices. His poetry was also published in Caribbean literary journals, including Bim, and he was one of the editors of Okyeame, journal of the Ghana Society of Writers.

A collection on his work entitled Fugue and Other Writings was published by Peepal Tree Press in 2012, including poems, short stories, autobiographical writing and critical writing.

== Bibliography ==
- Poems — In Sepia (1958)
- The Last Enchantment (London: MacGibbon and Kee, 1960; Peepal Tree Press, 2009, ISBN 9781845231170)
- Prolegomena to Caribbean Literature (Kingston: Institute of Jamaica, 1977)
- Interim (Kingston: Institute of Jamaica, 1978)
- Fugue and Other Writings (Peepal Tree Press, 2012, ISBN 9781845231095)

== Criticism and further reading ==
- Edward Brathwaite, Review of The Last Enchantment, in Bim, vol. 9, no. 33 (July–December 1961), pp. 74–5.
- Edward Brathwaite, "Roots", in Bim, vol. 10, no. 37 (July/December 1963), pp. 10–21.
- George Lamming, "The Last Enchantment" (review), in Race, vol. 2, no. 2 (May 1961), p. 92.
- Basil McFarlane, "Jamaican Novel: A Review of The Last Enchantment", in Jamaica Journal, vol. 9, nos 2 & 3 (1975), pp. 51–2.
- Gerald Moore, The Chosen Tongue: English Writing in the Tropical World (1969), Longman.
