= Walter Augustus Feurtado =

Jamaican publisher and author (1839–1910)

- Born: 1839
- Died: 23 November 1910 (aged 70–71); Kingston, Colony of Jamaica, British Empire
- Education: Wesleyan Chapel, Spanish Town
- Occupations: Accountant, genealogist, author
- Known for: Official and Other Personages of Jamaica, from 1655 to 1790

Walter Augustus Feurtado (1839 – 23 November 1910) was a Jamaican accountant, freemason, genealogist, and author whose biographical guide to the Official and Other Personages of Jamaica, from 1655 to 1790 (1896) has become an important source of biographical information for Jamaica.

== Early life and family ==
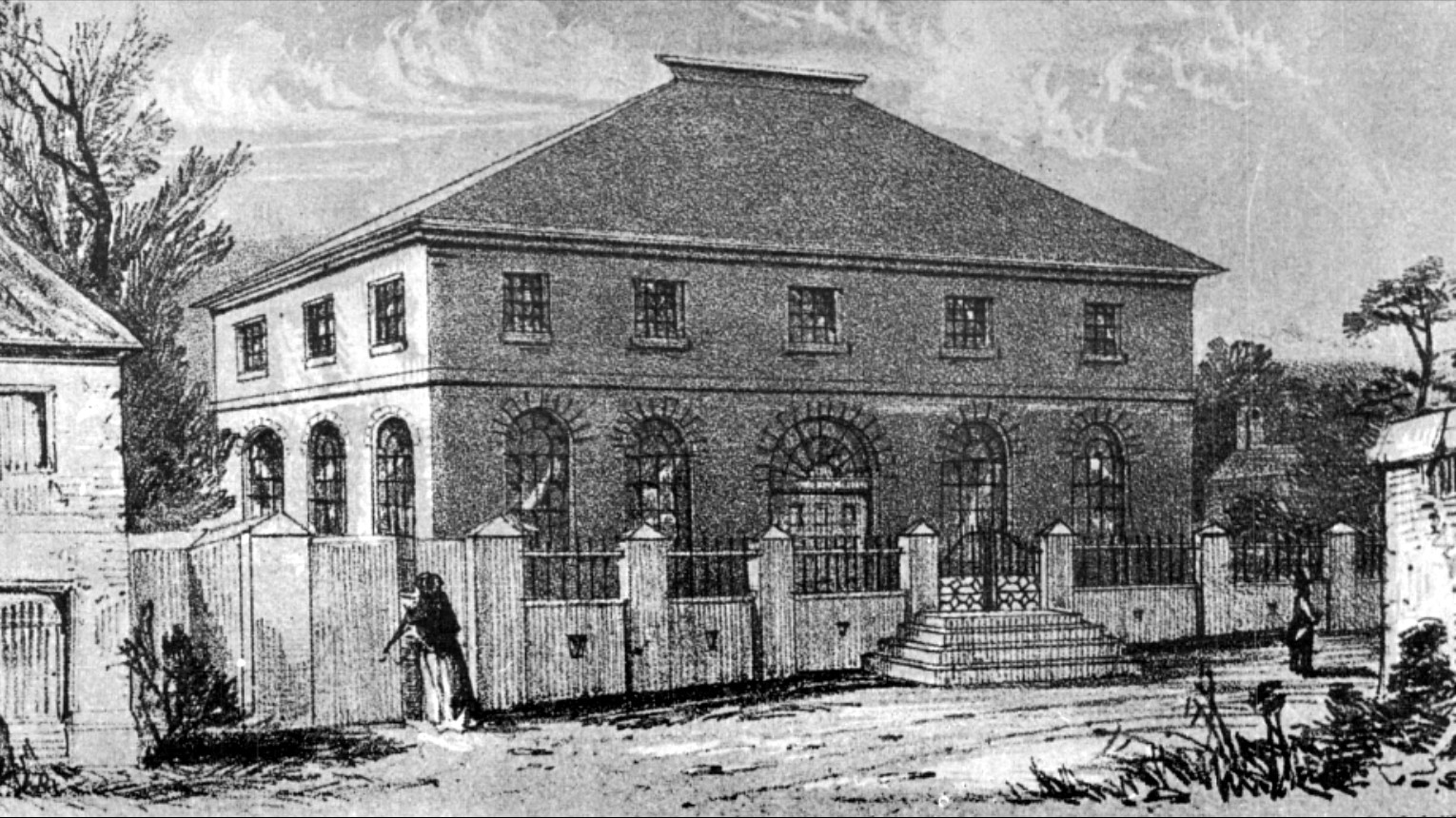
Wesleyan Chapel, Spanish Town, where Feurtado was educated

Walter Feurtado was born in 1839 to Augustus Feurtado and Emma Myers. His paternal grandfather was Isaac David Feurtado, a Jew, and his paternal grandmother's maiden name was Henriques. His maternal grandfather was Solomon Myers, treasurer from 1826 of the English and German Synagogue and secretary from 1841. His maternal grandmother was Eliza Brooks, matron of the Surry Gaol in 1850.

Jean M. King of the Institute of Jamaica, West India Reference Library, writes that the break with the Jewish faith probably occurred with the generations before Walter, for in January 1840 he was christened by the rector of the cathedral in Spanish Town (St Jago de la Vega Cathedral), the reverend Walter Scott Coward, who gave him his own first name.

He was educated first at a school run by the clerk to the cathedral and then at a school run by David McPherson at the Wesleyan Chapel.

== Career ==
Feurtado's first job was as a ticket seller for the railway in Spanish Town in 1853 along with his three brothers. He later worked for ten years as a clerk in the office of the Island Secretary where his job was to make searches. In the 1860s he was a member of the militia foot volunteers. From 1869 he worked as an accountant in the firm of Harvey and Bourke, solicitors in Kingston.

Feurtado's earliest publications were indexes to the laws of Jamaica (from 1880) and subsequently to the laws of England relating to British colonies (1890), but he is best known for his biographical guide to notable people of Jamaica from 1655 to 1790 that he prepared over many years in 58 volumes of manuscript while working at the law firm. His sources were local newspapers, the Jamaica Almanack, the journals of the House of Assembly, James Henry Lawrence-Archer's Monumental Inscriptions of the British West Indies (1875), manuscript memoirs (some now lost), and personal knowledge. The guide was eventually published by subscription in Kingston in 1896 as Official and Other Personages of Jamaica, from 1655 to 1790. At the time of its publication, Feurtado was living at Cottage Grove, Franklin Town, Kingston.

Feurtado was a freemason at a time when lodges in Jamaica were largely organised along ethnic and religious lines. He was a member of the Royal Lodge No. 207 in Jamaica in 1894 who noted that he was the former master of another lodge from which he had joined them. In 1916 he was recorded as the former master of that lodge. He was also greatly interested in astronomy.

== Death and legacy ==
Feurtado died at the age of 71 from heart and kidney disease in Kingston on 23 November 1910. His biographical guide has since become an important source of biographical information for Jamaica.

== Selected publications ==
Feurtado's works include:

- Index to the Laws of Jamaica, to 31st December, 1879. J. Murray Auld & Co., Kingston, 1880.
- Index to the Laws of Jamaica, to 31st December, 1888. Kingston, 1889.
- Index to the Laws of England Specially Relating to the Colonies, and British Possessions Abroad to 31st December, 1889. W. A. Feurtado, Kingston, 1890.
- A Forty-five Years' Reminiscence of the Characteristics & Characters of Spanish Town. A lecture delivered in Spanish Town on 31st July, 1890, in aid of the St. Catherine's Volunteer Band Fund, and re-delivered at the Collegiate Hall on 1st November, 1890, in aid of the New Organ Fund of St. Michael's Church, Kingston. W. A. Fuertado, Kingston, 1890.
- The Jubilee Reign of Her Most Gracious Majesty Queen Victoria in Jamaica: Being a complete account of the principal and important events which occurred in Jamaica during the fifty years reign &c. W. A. Fuertado, Kingston, 1890.
- Index to the Laws of Jamaica, to 31st December, 1892. W. A. Feurtado's Sons, Kingston, 1892.
- Official and Other Personages of Jamaica, from 1655 to 1790, to which is added, a chapter on the Peerage &c. W. A. Feurtado's Sons, Kingston, 1896.

== See also ==
- Frank Cundall
