= Stephanie Saulter =

Jamaican author, in the UK from 2003

- Born: Stephanie Saulter; Jamaica
- Occupation: Writer
- Website: stephaniesaulter.com

Stephanie Saulter is a Jamaican scientist and science fiction author.

== Life and career ==
Born in Jamaica and educated at MIT, Saulter lived in the United States for fifteen years before moving to London where she has lived since 2003. She studied genetics and anthropology as well as later working with marginalised communities and urban regeneration, from Miami to London. Her books deal with these topics as well as including diversity. Saulter came from a mixed race background where one of her brothers has cerebral palsy. Saulter has also written articles for a number of magazines. She has also worked as a judge for literary awards including the Una Marson Award entries in the Lignum Vitae Writing Awards.

=== Bibliography ===
==== ®Evolution ====
1. Gemsigns (2013)
2. Binary (2014)
3. Regeneration (2015)

==== Short fiction ====
- Audiovisionary (2014)/
- The Jo Fletcher Books Anthology. Quercus. 3 November 2016. ISBN 978-1-78429-790-9.

==== Essays ====
- Energy in SF: A Conversation (2016) with Ian McDonald
