= J. E. Clare McFarlane =

Jamaican civil servant and poet (1894–1962)

J. E. Clare McFarlane OBE JP FRSA
- Born: John Ebenezer Clare McFarlane; 12 December 1894; Spanish Town, St Catherine, Colony of Jamaica, British Empire
- Died: 13 October 1962 (aged 67); Jamaica
- Education: Cornwall College
- Occupations: Civil servant and poet
- Known for: Poet Laureate of Jamaica (1953–1962)
- Awards: Musgrave Medal

John Ebenezer Clare McFarlane OBE JP FRSA (12 December 1894 – 13 October 1962) was a Jamaican civil servant and poet. He was appointed Jamaica's second Poet Laureate in 1953, holding the position until his death. He received the Institute of Jamaica's Musgrave Silver Medal in 1935 and the Gold Medal in 1958.

== Life ==
John Ebenezer Clare McFarlane was born on 12 December 1894 in Spanish Town, Saint Catherine Parish, Jamaica, to Charles Samuel McFarlane and Imogene Spence. He was educated at Cornwall College, and in 1913 entered the colonial civil service.

A founder of the Poetry League of Jamaica in 1923, McFarlane compiled several anthologies and published five collections of poetry. He was the first Jamaican financial secretary.

McFarlane was appointed Poet Laureate of Jamaica in 1953, and held the title until his death.

With his wife Amy Hall Livingstone, a teacher whom he married in 1917, McFarlane had seven children. His sons Basil and R. L. Clare McFarlane also became poets. His daughter Sheila J. Clare McFarlane immigrated to the United States in 1966, where she was a Registered Nurse until her retirement in 2002. She lives in Manhasset, Long Island, NY. His son Douglas (and Sheila's twin brother) still resides in England.

McFarlane died on 13 October 1962 at University College Hospital, Jamaica.

== Works ==
- (ed.) Voices from Summerland, 1929
- Daphne: A Tale of the Hills of St. Andrew, Jamaica, 1931
- The Challenge of our Time, 1945
- (ed.) A Treasury of Jamaican Poetry, 1950
- A Literature in the Making, 1956
- The Magdalene: The Story of Supreme Love, 1957
