= Malachi Smith (poet) =

Jamaican dub poet

Malachi Smith is a Jamaican dub poet.

== Biography ==
Malachi Smith was born in Jamaica in the parish of Westmoreland, and grew up in Clarendon, St. Elizabeth and St. Catherine, staying with various family members. The son of a preacher, Smith began writing poetry at the age of eight, and recorded his first poem, Kimbo to Kimbo, in 1979. His other CDs are Blacker the Berry - The Sweeter The Cherry, Throw Two Punch (1998), Middle Passage and Luv Dub Fever. He is currently working on a new CD project Hail to Jamaica, a collection that will feature most of his award-winning poems about Jamaica. Smith won the 2009 most outstanding writer award for the Jamaica Development Commission's Creative Writing Competition.

A retired member of the Jamaica Constabulary Force at the rank of detective corporal, Malachi is based in Miami.
