= Edward Baugh =

Jamaican poet and scholar (1936–2023)

Edward Baugh CD
- Born: Edward Alston Cecil Baugh; 10 January 1936; Port Antonio, Colony of Jamaica, British Empire
- Died: 9 December 2023 (aged 87); Kingston, Jamaica
- Education: University College of the West Indies; Queen's University, Canada; University of Manchester
- Occupations: Poet and scholar
- Notable work: West Indian Poetry 1900–1970: A Study in Cultural Decolonisation (1971); Derek Walcott: Memory as Vision (1978); A Tale from the Rainforest (1988); It Was the Singing (2000)
- Awards: Bocas Henry Swanzy Award, 2021

Edward Alston Cecil Baugh CD (10 January 1936 – 9 December 2023) was a Jamaican poet and scholar, recognised as an authority on the work of Derek Walcott, whose Selected Poems (2007) Baugh edited, having in 1978 authored the first book-length study of the Nobel-winning poet's work, Derek Walcott: Memory as Vision.

== Biography ==
Edward Alston Cecil Baugh was born on 10 January 1936 in Port Antonio, Jamaica, the son of Edward Percival Baugh, purchasing agent, and Ethel Maud Duhaney-Baugh. He began writing poetry at Titchfield High School. He won a scholarship to study English literature at the University College of the West Indies and later did postgraduate studies at Queen's University in Ontario, Canada, and at the University of Manchester in England, where he earned a PhD in 1964.

Baugh taught at the Cave Hill campus of the University of the West Indies from 1965 to 1967, then at the university's Mona campus from 1968 to 2001, eventually being appointed professor of English in 1978 and public orator in 1985. He has also held visiting appointments at the University of California, Dalhousie University, University of Hull, University of Wollongong, Flinders University, Macquarie University, University of Miami and Howard University.

In 2012, he was awarded a Gold Musgrave Medal by the Institute of Jamaica.

In March 2021, Baugh was announced as the co-recipient, together with Mervyn Morris, of the Bocas Henry Swanzy Award for Distinguished Service to Caribbean Letters.

Baugh died in Kingston early on 10 December 2023, at the age of 87, survived by his wife Sheila and their daughters Sarah and Katherine.

== Scholarly works ==
His scholarly publications include West Indian Poetry 1900–1970: A Study in Cultural Decolonisation (1971); Critics on Caribbean Literature (1978); Derek Walcott: Memory as Vision (1978), the first book-length study of Walcott's work; and an annotated edition of Walcott's Another Life (2004), with Colbert Nepaulsingh. Chancellor, I Present (1998) collects a number of the citations Baugh prepared and delivered as Public Orator of The University of the West Indies, Mona campus, for the presentation of honorary degrees during the annual presentation of graduates ceremony.

== Poetry ==
Baugh's poems appeared in various magazines and anthologies years before the publication of his first collection, A Tale from the Rainforest (1988). This was followed by It Was the Singing (2000) and Black Sand: New and Selected Poems (2013).

== Awards and honours ==
- 1995: UWI Vice-Chancellor's Award for Excellence in Teaching and Administration
- 1995: Commander of the Order of Distinction (CD) for contributions to Literature, Education, and the University of the West Indies
- 1998: Silver Musgrave Medal from the Institute of Jamaica
- 1999: Pelican Award (UWI Guild of Graduates)
- 2012: Gold Musgrave Medal, Institute of Jamaica
- 2021: Bocas Henry Swanzy Award for Distinguished Service to Caribbean Letters

== Selected bibliography ==
- West Indian Poetry 1900–1970: A Study in Cultural Decolonisation (1971)
- Critics on Caribbean Literature (1978)
- Derek Walcott: Memory as Vision: "Another Life" (1978)
- A Tale from the Rainforest (1988)
- I Was a Teacher Too (1991)
- It Was the Singing (2000)
- Black Sand: New and Selected Poems (2013)
