= Thomas MacDermot =

Jamaican poet, novelist, and editor (1870–1933)

- Born: 26 June 1870; Clarendon, Colony of Jamaica, British Empire
- Died: 8 October 1933 (aged 63)
- Other name: Tom Redcam
- Occupations: Poet; novelist; editor
- Known for: Poet Laureate of Jamaica (1933)

Thomas MacDermot (26 June 1870 – 8 October 1933) was a Jamaican poet, novelist, and editor, editing the Jamaica Times for more than 20 years. He was "probably the first Jamaican writer to assert the claim of the West Indies to a distinctive place within English-speaking culture". He also published under the pseudonym Tom Redcam (derived from his surname spelled in reverse). He was the first Poet Laureate of Jamaica.

== Early life ==
Thomas Henry MacDermot was born in Clarendon Parish, Jamaica, the third of five children, and spent much of his childhood in Trelawny. He was educated at the Falmouth Academy and at the Church of England Grammar School in Kingston, Jamaica.

== Career ==
He was a teacher before taking up journalism, at The Jamaica Post, The Daily Gleaner and the Jamaica Times, of which he was editor for 20 years. He worked to promote Jamaican literature through all of his writing, starting a weekly short story contest in the Jamaica Times in 1899. Notable among the young writers he helped and encouraged are Claude McKay and H. G. de Lisser.

In 1903, MacDermot started the All Jamaica Library, a series of novellas and short stories written by Jamaicans about Jamaica that were reasonably priced to encourage local readers. Alongside his work as a journalist, he wrote two novels. The first, Becka’s Buckra Baby, is said to mark the beginning of modern Caribbean writing. MacDermot's poems were not collected into a single volume until 1951. He was posthumously proclaimed Jamaica's first Poet Laureate for the period 1910–33 by the Jamaican branch of the Poetry League.

MacDermot retired because of illness in 1922.

== Death ==
He died in an English nursing home in 1933, aged 63.

== Bibliography ==
- Becka's Buckra Baby (1903), Times Printery, Jamaica.
- One Brown Girl And ¼ (1909), Times Printery, Jamaica.
- Orange Valley and Other Poems (1951), Kingston, Jamaica: Pioneer Press.
