= Delores Gauntlett =

Jamaican poet

Delores Gauntlett at her first poetry workshop

Delores Gauntlett (née McAnuff), born and raised in Beechamville, St. Ann, Jamaica, is a Jamaican poet whose work has appeared in regional and international publications. She came to writing poetry in her 50s, and this profile reflects her writing journey.

== Literary Works ==
Gauntlett has published two collections of poems: Freeing her Hands to Clap, probes personal memory, fear, love and loss, the collection was awarded highly commended entry for Adult Literature in the 1999 National Book Development Council of Jamaica/Una Marson Biennial Award, Observer Literary Series (2000). Her second book, The Watertank Revisited, was published by Peepal Tree Press (2005).

== About the Author ==
Gauntlett developed a love for poetry around the age of eight, reciting poems at government-sponsored art festivals, JCDC; community and church concerts, and recited for fun during school recess at Dinthill Technical High. Near-50 years later, in the 2000s, she decided to take a deeper look at poetry and poetry writing, and enrolled in Wayne Brown's Poetry Workshops, where she got a taste of writing in poetic meter. The workshop's routine warm-up segment was to weekly recite carefully selected poems, one new poem learned by heart each week, and recited weekly to the audience of workshop colleagues, week after workshop-week, spanning about four years.

== Poetic Endeavors and Awards ==
Her poems appeared in a range of anthologies internationally, including: The UK Poetry Society Poetry News; The Caribbean Writer; Jamaica Journal; The Sunday Gleaner; Poetas del Caribe Antologia, Volumes I and II, Spanish-translated collection, Fundacion Editorial El perro y la rana (2009); New Caribbean Poetry - An Anthology; Jubilation Anthology, celebrating 50 Years of Jamaican Independence, 2012; PREE; In This Breadfruit Kingdom, Blouse & Skirt Books and the National Library of Jamaica (2017), imprint of Blue Banyan Books; Kunapipi - Journal of Postcolonial Writing, Vol. XXVI, University of Wollongong.

1999, she received the David Hough prize, and in 2006 the Daily News Prize, both from The Caribbean Writer. , University of Virginia Press; and in1999, 2000, 2001, and 2004 Gauntlett was the winner of the then annual Jamaica Observer Literary Competitions.

Gauntlett received the 2007 U.K. Poetry Society's Poetry News-Members' Poem Competition. She was shortlisted for the National Book Development competition; and the 2009 Small Axe competition; and in 2007 was runner-up for the Hamish Canham Prize for her poem After He Knew.

2023, Gauntlett was nominated and inducted into the Jamaica Poetry Archives of the National Library of Jamaica. Her work was annotated by Professor Yvonna Rousseva in San Jose State University's project, "Bibliography of a Caribbean Poet".

2012, her poem, A Song for My Father, first published in New Caribbean Poetry, Carcanet Press, edited by Kei Miller, was selected for the Poetry 2012 Written World Project, a BBC collaboration with The Scottish Poetry Library, showcasing poems from each participating nation in the 2012 London Summer Olympics. The anthology's editor, Kei Miller, was invited to introduce and read the poem on BBC's Arts & Culture television program.

In 2024, Gauntlett's poem, Under These Stones, first published in New Caribbean Poetry, was republished by Cambridge University Press, in anthology titled, Songs of Ourselves, Volume 3, for Cambridge International English Literature syllabus.
