= Geoffrey Philp =

Jamaican writer (born 1958)

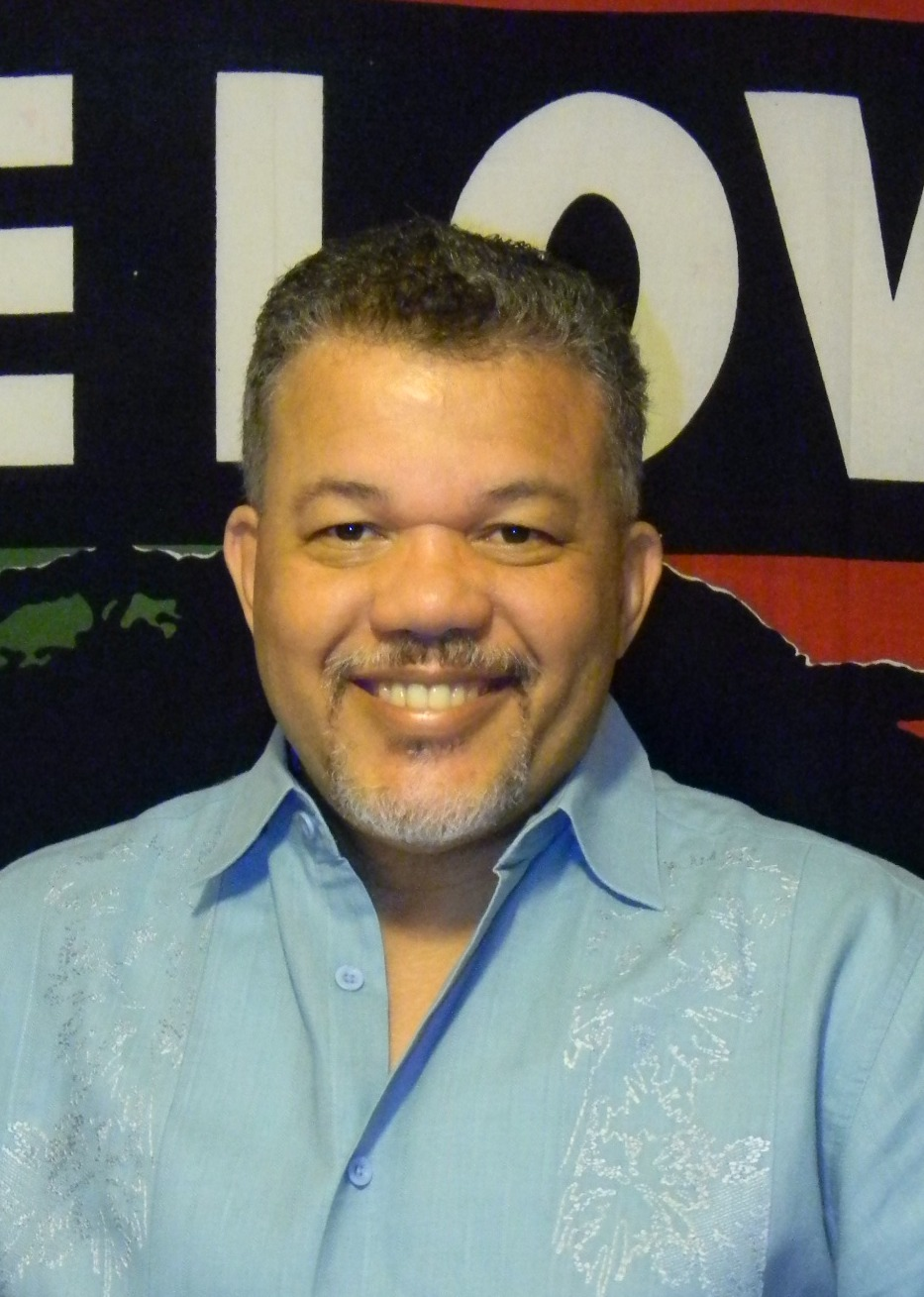
Geoffrey Philp

Geoffrey Philp (born 1958) is a Jamaican poet, novelist, and playwright. Philp used to reside in Jamaica, where he was born and attended Jamaica College, but he relocated in 1979 to Miami, Florida. He is the author of the novel Benjamin, My Son (2003), and six poetry collections: Exodus and Other Poems (1990), Florida Bound (1995), Hurricane Center (1998), Xango Music (2001), Twelve Poems and A Story for Christmas (2005), and Dub Wise (2010). He has also written two books of short stories, Uncle Obadiah and the Alien (1997) and Who's Your Daddy? and Other Stories (2009); a play, Ogun's Last Stand (2005), and the children's books Grandpa Sydney's Anancy Stories (2007) and Marcus and the Amazons (2011). He also has a blog where he critiques other people's literary works.

His work has been mainly influenced by Derek Walcott, Kamau Brathwaite, V. S. Naipaul, Bob Marley, and Joseph Campbell and contains some elements of magical realism. Many of his short stories focus on the dilemmas facing fatherless children in the Caribbean, the disruptive effects of the Jamaican diaspora on family and community life, and the spiritual and political dimensions of reggae and the Rastafari movement. A musical influence on Philp is Bob Marley, who utilized his lyrics to convey many topics such as Caribbean life and mixed diverse aspects of existence in a powerful way. Benjamin, My Son, in particular, examines Caribbean life within the context of established Christian religions and African Yoruba-based traditions, while using the framework of Dante's Inferno.

Philp's awards include an Individual Artist Fellowship from the Florida Arts Council, an artist-in-residence at the Seaside Institute, Sauza "Stay Pure" Award, Canute Brodhurst Prize and James Michener fellowships at the University of Miami, where he earned his Master of Arts in Creative Writing. He has been nominated for and received several prizes, the most notable of which is the "Outstanding Writer" award from the Jamaica Cultural Development Commission. His reviews, articles, poems and short stories have also appeared in Small Axe, Asili, The Caribbean Writer, Gulf Stream, Florida in Poetry: A History of the Imagination, Wheel and Come Again: An Anthology of Reggae Poetry, Whispers from the Cotton Tree Root, The Oxford Book of Caribbean Verse, and is a contributing writer to Jamaicans.com, and Visible Magazine. He lives in Miami, Florida.

== Works ==
Novel

- (2003) Benjamin, My Son

Short story collection

- (1997) Uncle Obadiah and the Alien
- (2009) Who's Your Daddy? and Other Stories

Poetry collections

- (1990) Exodus and Other Poems
- (1995) Florida Bound
- (1998) Hurricane Center
- (2001) Xango Music
- (2005) Twelve Poems and A Story for Christmas
- (2010) Dub Wise

(2023) Archipelagos

Drama

- (2005) Ogun's Last Stand

Children's books

- (2007) Grandpa Sydney's Anancy Stories
- (2011) Marcus and the Amazons
