= Vanessa Spence =

Jamaican novelist (born 1961)

Vanessa Spence (born 1961, Kingston, Jamaica) is a Jamaican novelist. Her first novel, The Roads Are Down, won the 1994 Commonwealth Writers' Prize, Best First Novel, Canada and the Caribbean.

She grew up in Jamaica, and studied at the University of Oxford, and Yale University. She works as an economist, in Kingston. She lives in the Blue Mountains.

== Awards ==
- 1994, Commonwealth Writers' Prize, Best First Novel, Canada and the Caribbean

== Works ==
- The Roads Are Down, Heinemann, 1993, ISBN 978-0-435-98930-9
