= Colin Channer =

Jamaican writer (born 1963)

- Born: 13 October 1963 (age 62); Kingston, Jamaica
- Occupations: Novelist, poet, creative director, festival founder, college professor, musician
- Website: https://www.colinchanner.com

Colin Channer (born 13 October 1963) is a Jamaican writer, often referred to as "Bob Marley with a pen," due to the spiritual, sensual, social themes presented from a literary Jamaican perspective. His first two full-length novels, Waiting in Vain and Satisfy My Soul, bear the titles of well known Marley songs. He has also written the short story collection Passing Through, and the novellas I'm Still Waiting and The Girl with the Golden Shoes. Channer's poetry collection Console was included in The New Yorker's The Best Books of 2023.

== Early life and education ==
Born in Kingston, Jamaica, Colin Channer is the youngest of four children. He attended the Ardenne and Meadowbrook High Schools, where his writing career began with the penning of love poems and other such correspondence on behalf of male students at $1 a letter—poems costing an extra 50 cents. After high school, Channer migrated to New York on 24 July 1982, intent on a career in journalism. But it was his discovery of Caryl Phillips' The Final Passage that allowed him to see the possibilities of fiction writing from an authentic Caribbean—specifically Jamaican—perspective. Channer earned a B.A. in Media Communications from CUNY Hunter College.

== Career ==
In 1988, Channer moved to Atlanta, where he lived for three years, working as a magazine journalist. He returned to New York in 1991 after undergoing a cornea transplant to save his failing eyesight. He began writing his first novel on speculation, then attempted to get it sold. In this time, he worked as a freelance copy editor in various design firms and advertising agencies. He also wrote a collection of short stories and a screenplay. Two of the short stories were anthologized in Soulfires. In 1998, the novel was published as Waiting in Vain, which was selected as a Critic's Choice by The Washington Post and hailed as a clear redefinition of the Caribbean novel. The novel, whose main characters were Jamaican, dealt with contemporary issues of class and identity in a multicultural context. Waiting in Vain was also excerpted in Hot Spots: The best erotic writing in Modern Fiction, which placed Channer in the company of writers such as Russell Banks, E. L. Doctorow, Don DeLillo, and David Foster Wallace. Time Out New York also selected this award-winning book as Book of the Summer.

The screenplay became the novella I'm Still Waiting, which was one of four anthologized stories in the volume Got To Be Real. The book itself was singular in that it was a collection by the leading black male writers of the day, the others being E. Lynn Harris, Eric Jerome Dickey, and Marcus Major. Another of the short stories from that period was developed into his second novel, Satisfy My Soul. Released in 2002, Satisfy My Soul depicted the conflict between African spirituality and Christianity in the context of Black relationships.

Passing Through, published in 2004, is a collection of connected stories set on the fictional Caribbean island of San Carlos. The stories move in chronological order from 1903 to the present day.

== Literary style ==
Channer has cited Naguib Mahfouz, Gabriel García Márquez, V.S. Naipaul, John Updike, and even Bob Marley among his influences. Similar to Marley, Channer has established his literary style with an unapologetic sensuality, contemporary themes with profound thematic undercurrents, diverse backdrops such as Ghana, London, New York City, and Jamaica, as well as dialogue steeped in Jamaican patois. This has also caused many critics to deem him a reggae writer.

== Additional ventures ==
=== Eziba and Squad 1962 ===
Although he is best known as a novelist, Colin Channer's influence has reached beyond the world of literature to touch the public with his words in other ways. In 2001, he was named as co-creative director of Eziba, an online retailer of global handicrafts which went out of business in 2005. After his successes with Eziba, he launched his own design and branding firm, Squad 1962. Based in Chelsea, Squad 1962 was retained by Island Outpost, the collection of boutique hotels created by Island Records founder Chris Blackwell, the Rock and Roll Hall of Fame inductee who launched the global careers of musicians such as Bob Marley, U2 and Melissa Etheridge.

=== Calabash International Literary Festival ===
In 2001, along with poet Kwame Dawes, Channer also launched the Calabash International Literary Festival Trust, a registered not-for-profit entity whose mission is "to transform the literary arts in the Caribbean by being the region’s best-managed producer of workshops, seminars and performances." The annual festival takes place each year at Jake's in Treasure Beach, Jamaica.

Calabash has become the festival of choice for some of the world's most gifted authors. 2005 launched The Calabash Chapbook Series, which, to date, includes six books of poems from workshop members. Of these, Ishion Hutchinson, was accepted into NYU's creative writing master's program. In July 2006, Akashic Books published the fiction anthology Iron Balloons: Hit Fiction from Jamaica's Calabash Writer's Workshop from the original workshop. Channer edited the volume, as well as contributing the short story "How to Beat a Child the Right and Proper Way".

=== Music and teaching ===
In addition to being the founder and artistic director of Calabash, Channer is the founder and bass player of the reggae band pecock Jaxxon. Channer has taught in London, New York City, and Jamaica. He was an assistant professor of English and coordinator of the B.A. creative writing program at CUNY Medgar Evers College and is currently a Newhouse Visiting professor in creative writing at Wellesley College.

== Honours ==
Channer received the Cullman Fellowship from the New York Public Library, and the Henry Merritt Wriston Fellowship from Brown University. He, Celeste Ng, and Reyna Grande won the 2023 Writers for Writers Award from Poets & Writers. Channer's poetry collection Console was included in New Yorker's The Best Books of 2023.

== List of publications ==
- Soulfires: Young Black Men on Love and Violence, with the short stories "Black Boy, Brown Girl, Brownstone" and "The Ballad of the Sad Chanteuse" (Penguin, 1996)
- Waiting in Vain (One World/Ballantine, 1998)
- Got To Be Real, with the novella "I'm Still Waiting", (New American Library, 2000)
- Satisfy My Soul (One World/Ballantine, 2002)
- Passing Through (One World/Ballantine, 2004)
- Iron Balloons (Akashic Books, 2006)
- The Girl with the Golden Shoes (Akashic Books, 2007)
- Console (Farrar, Straus & Giroux, 2023)

== Personal life ==
A dual citizen of Jamaica and the United States, Channer lives with his family in the Fort Greene neighborhood of Brooklyn, New York.
