= Mikey Smith =

Jamaican dub poet (1954–1983)

- Born: Michael Smith; 14 September 1954; Kingston, Colony of Jamaica, British Empire
- Died: 17 August 1983 (aged 28); Stony Hill, St Andrew, Jamaica
- Cause of death: Blunt force trauma
- Education: St George's College Extension School
- Occupation: Poet
- Notable work: Mi Cyaan Believe It

Michael Smith (14 September 1954 – 17 August 1983), commonly referred to as Mikey Smith, was a Jamaican dub poet. Along with Linton Kwesi Johnson, and Mutabaruka, he was one of the best-known dub poets. In 1978, Smith represented Jamaica at the 11th World Festival of Youth and Students in Cuba. His album Mi Cyaan Believe It includes his poem of the same title. He had left-anarchist leanings and Rastafarian sympathies, and was allegedly murdered by political opponents associated with the right-wing Jamaica Labour Party (JLP) after he had heckled the Jamaican Minister of Culture at a political rally on 17 August 1983.

== Life and work ==
Born in Kingston, Jamaica, in 1954, Smith was educated at Kingston College and the St George's College Extension School. He also studied at the Jamaican School of Drama with Jean "Binta" Breeze and Oku Onuora. Some of Smith's work was released by Linton Kwesi Johnson on his LKJ label. Smith appeared on the BBC television series Ebony and the BBC also broadcast a documentary based on his association with Johnson. "Mi Cyaan Believe It" is most remembered for Smith's heartfelt phrase: "Laaawwwd - mi cyaan believe it - mi seh - mi cyaan believe it." In 1982, Smith released his debut album and performed extensively in Europe supporting such acts as Gregory Isaacs. He recorded a session for John Peel, which was broadcast by the BBC on 4 May 1982. He continued to work as a social worker representing prisoners in Gun Court. His outspoken commentary on the "-isms and schisms of 'politricks'" in Jamaica led to his life being cut short.

Linton Kwesi Johnson, during a presentation on Smith's life and work at the second Caribbean Conference on Culture at the University of the West Indies, Mona campus, had the following to say: "The late Jamaican poet, Michael Smith, was to my mind one of the most interesting and original poetic voices to emerge from the English-speaking Caribbean during the last quarter of the 20th century."

Johnson, who produced Smith's first and only album in London, also wrote the following in an article for the Jamaica Observer: "In 1978, Michael Smith represented Jamaica at the 11th World Festival of Youth and Students in Cuba. That year saw the release of his first recording, a single titled, 'Word', followed by perhaps his most famous piece 'Mi Cyaan Believe It' and 'Roots'."

In 1981, Smith performed in Barbados during CARIFESTA and was filmed by BBC Television performing "Mi Cyaan Believe It" for the documentary From Brixton To Barbados.

In 1982, Smith took London by storm with performances at the Camden Centre for the International Book Fair of Radical Black and Third World Books, and also at Lambeth Town Hall in Brixton for "Creation for Liberation".

While in Britain, together with Oku Onoura, Smith also did a successful poetry tour and recorded the Mi Cyaan Believe It album for Island Records.

Smith is the subject of Peter Ashbourne's opera Reggae Opera Mikey.

== Death ==
Smith was killed following a clash at a political rally at Stony Hill, Saint Andrew, on 17 August 1983 (Marcus Garvey's birthday); After arguing with three men, he was hit by a stone thrown by one of them. Linton Kwesi Johnson has recalled how the circumstances of Smith's death are shrouded in controversy:

As far as I understand the facts, Mikey had attended a political meeting in Stony Hill where the ruling JLP Minister of Education was speaking and [he] had heckled her. The following day, he was confronted by three [persons believed to be] party activists, an argument ensued, stones were thrown and Mikey died from a blow to his head.

Kamau Brathwaite's 1984 book History of the Voice was dedicated to the memory of Smith and describes him as having been "stoned to death".
