= Heather Royes =

Heather Hope Royes (born 1943) is a Jamaican media consultant, HIV/AIDS consultant and poet.

== Education and career ==
Royes received a bachelor of arts from the University of Oregon. She attended the University of the West Indies, Mona and earned a Ph.D. in mass communication from the University of Wisconsin–Madison in 1980. She has worked in the Jamaican government, including as cultural attaché in Mexico City in the 1980s.

She studies HIV/AIDS and, in 1993, published a pioneering study on "Jamaican Men and Same-Sex Activities." She has authored several papers and reports on the subject, including a 1999 UNESCO report on Jamaica's experience with HIV/AIDS.

== Poetry ==
Royes has been writing poetry since the 1960s. Her poetry has been included in anthologies such as Heinemann's Jamaica Woman (1980) and Anthology of African and Caribbean Writing in English (1982), the Penguin Book of Caribbean Verse in English (1986), and the Oxford Book of Caribbean Verse (2005). In 1996 she published her first collection, The Caribbean Raj, consisting of about 30 poems divided into four sections. In 2001 she won the National Literary Competition and in 2005 she published a second volume, Days and Nights of the Blue Iguana, which included some poems from her first collection as well as new works.
