= A. L. Hendriks =

Jamaican writer (1922–1992)

Arthur Lemière Hendriks (1922–1992) was a Jamaican poet, writer, and broadcasting director (known as Micky Hendriks in his broadcasting career). He was particularly well known for his contributions to The Christian Science Monitor, The Daily Gleaner, and BIM. He also contributed as a columnist and literary critic to the Daily Gleaner.

== Biography ==
A. L. Hendriks was born in 1922 in Kingston, Jamaica, to a Jamaican father and a French mother. Hendriks was educated at Jamaica College and briefly at Ottershaw College in Surrey, England. After joining the family business for a few years he entered broadcasting in 1950. He became Director of Caribbean Broadcasting in Barbados and Trinidad and Tobago Television. In 1961, he was General Manager of the Jamaica Broadcasting Corporation, after which he became a television director in London. In the late 1960s he moved to Bermuda, where he was resident director of Thomson Television. After this, he settled in England. He became a freelance writer in 1971. He wrote both poems and short stories and traveled widely throughout the Caribbean. The BBC's Caribbean Voices program featured his work several times.

His early collections of verse, which include On This Mountain and Other Poems (1965), Muet - Poems (1971), and These Green Island and Other Poems (1971), made use of rigorously economical forms to frame their imaginative commentaries on a wide range of personal and social concerns. The long title sequence of The Islanders (1983), a vivid evocation of the human and natural aspects of the Caribbean, marked the emergence of more musically flexible modes of verse. His principal subsequent collections are The Naked Ghost (1984) and To Speak Simply (1988), a selected edition of his poetry containing much previously uncollected material. Much of his best work from the early 1980s onward achieves striking dramatic effectiveness through his accomplished use of Jamaican patois. His poem "The Baptist" was published in Bite In 2 by Cecil Gray. Among his other publications is the historical survey Great Families of Jamaica (1984).

He was the father of five daughters and two sons. He died in 1992 at the age of 69. He was married several times.

== Works ==
- These Green Islands, and Other Poems (Bolivar Press, 1971)
- To Speak Simply: Selected Poems 1961-1986 (Hippopotamus Press, 1988)
- On This Mountain: and Other Poems (Deutsch, 1965)
- Check (Headland Publications, 1988 - compilation with Harris and Hendricks)
- Naked Ghost and Other Poems (Outposts Pubns., 1984)
- The Islanders, and Other Poems (Savacou Co-operative, 1983)
- Muet (Outposts Publications, 1971)
- Madonna of the Unknown Nation (Workshop P, N4, 1974)
- Great Families of Jamaica (1984)
- Road to Lacovia
- Albert
- Jamaican Fragment
