= Olive Senior =

Jamaican author (born 1941)

- Born: Olive Marjorie Senior; 23 December 1941 (age 84); Cockpit Country, Trelawny, Colony of Jamaica, British Empire
- Education: Thomson Foundation; Carleton University
- Occupations: Poet, novelist, short-story and non-fiction writer
- Writing career
- Period: 1960s–present
- Notable works: Summer Lightning (1986); Gardening in the Tropics (1994); Encyclopedia of Jamaican Heritage (2004); Over The Roofs of the World (2005)
- Notable awards: Commonwealth Writers' Prize; Bressani Award; OCM Bocas Prize for Caribbean Literature; Poet Laureate of Jamaica, 2021
- Website: www.olivesenior.com

Olive Marjorie Senior (born 23 December 1941) is a Jamaican poet, novelist, short story and non-fiction writer based in Toronto, Ontario, Canada. In 2005, she was awarded the Musgrave Medal in gold by the Institute of Jamaica for her contributions to literature. Her other awards include Norman Washington Manley Foundation Award for Excellence (2003), an honorary doctorate from the University of the West Indies (2017), and the OCM Bocas Prize for Caribbean Literature (2016). Senior was appointed Poet Laureate of Jamaica in 2021, serving in the post until 2024.

== Life and career ==
Born in rural Jamaica in Cockpit Country, Trelawny. Olive Senior was the seventh of 10 children. She was the child of peasant farmers, but was often sent to live with her affluent Aunt and Uncle for extended periods of time in Haddo, Westmoreland. The glaring differences between these two homes greatly influenced Senior’s writing style and themes. She attended Montego Bay High School for Girls. At the age of 19, she joined the staff of the Jamaica Gleaner in Kingston and later worked with the Jamaica Information Service. Senior later won a scholarship to study journalism at the Thomson Foundation in Cardiff, Wales, and as a Commonwealth scholar attended Carleton University School of Journalism in Ottawa, Ontario, Canada. It was at Carleton where she took a course in creative writing, and began to take the practice seriously as a career. While studying at Carleton from 1964-1967, she began writing her works Talking of Trees (1985), and Summer Lightning (1986), which went on to win the Commonwealth Writer’s Prize.

While at university, she began writing fiction and poetry. On her return to Jamaica, she worked as a freelancer in public relations, publishing, and speech writing, before joining the Institute of Social and Economic Research at the University of the West Indies, where she edited the journal Social and Economic Studies (1972–77). In 1982, she joined the Institute of Jamaica as editor of the Jamaica Journal.

In 1987, Senior won the Commonwealth Writers' Prize for her first collection of stories, Summer Lightning. After Hurricane Gilbert hit Jamaica in 1988, Senior moved to Europe, where she lived in Portugal, the Netherlands, and the United Kingdom, before settling in Toronto, Ontario, Canada, in the early 1990s. During her travels, she continued to work in freelance; writing, publishing, and working in public relations. Her work received many awards, such as Washington Manley’s Foundation Award for Excellence, and Musgrave Gold Medal from the Institute of Jamaica for her contributions to Literature in 2005.

In 2013, Senior delivered the keynote address at the Edinburgh World Writers' Conference: Trinidad, presented by the Bocas Lit Fest in partnership with the Edinburgh International Book Festival and the British Council.

In 2019, she was awarded the Matt Cohen Award by the Writers' Trust of Canada in honour of her career as a writer.

At an investiture ceremony on Wednesday, 17 March 2021, Senior was appointed Jamaica's 2021–2024 Poet Laureate.

In 2024, she was honoured as a Royal Society of Literature International Writer, a lifelong award recognising the contribution to literature of writers across the globe.

Senior continues to conduct writing workshops, lectures, and readings at many institutions internationally, including the University of Toronto, St. Lawrence University, University of Miami, Barnard College, and New York University. Senior continues to conduct writing workshops, lectures, and readings at many institutions internationally, including the University of Toronto, St. Lawrence University, University of Miami, Barnard College, New York University, and the University of the West Indies. She remains an active faculty member of the Humber School for Writers at Humber College in Toronto, Canada. Senior also serves as a writing mentor for the Diaspora Dialogues, a Canadian charitable arts‑organization headquartered in Toronto.

== Literary works ==
Senior has published five collections of poems: Talking of Trees (1985), Gardening in the Tropics (1994), Over the Roofs of the World (2005), Shell (2007), and in 2022 Hurricane Watch: New and Collected Poems. Kate Kellaway writing in The Observer noted in a 2022 review: "Olive Senior – the name itself nudging towards becoming a poem – has an inclusive attitude towards her work and never disdains humble things. She will give full, equal and affectionate attention to mango trees, magpies and even to a Christmas pudding (a recent, gorgeous poem, soaked in rum) as well as to global and racial injustice and environmental issues."

Senior's short story collection Summer Lightning (1986) won the Commonwealth Writers' Prize; it was followed by Arrival of the Snake Woman (also includes "The Two Grandmothers", which is one of her best short stories) (1989, 2009) and Discerner of Hearts (1995). Her most recent collection of stories, The Pain Tree (2015), was the overall winner of the 2016 OCM Bocas Prize for Caribbean Literature, having won the fiction category.

Her first novel, Dancing Lessons (Cormorant Books, 2011), was shortlisted for the 2012 Commonwealth Book Prize in the Canada region.

Her non-fiction works include The Message Is Change (1972), about Michael Manley's first election victory; A-Z of Jamaican Heritage (1984; expanded and republished as Encyclopedia of Jamaican Heritage in 2004); and Working Miracles: Women's Lives in the English-Speaking Caribbean (1991).

Senior's most recent non-fiction book, Dying To Better Themselves: West Indians and the Building of the Panama Canal, was published in September 2014 – 100 years after the opening of the Panama Canal, 15 August 1914. On 1 April 2015 the book was shortlisted for the 2015 OCM Bocas Prize for Caribbean Literature, winning the non-fiction category.

An extended critical evaluation of Senior's work can be found in Olive Senior by Denise deCaires Narain (2011), published by Northcote House Publishers (UK) in collaboration with the British Council as part of the Writers and Their Work series.

Senior's work often addresses questions of Caribbean identity in terms of gender and ethnicity. Her works are known for their use of the Creole vernacular, aiming to create a well-detailed, rich, and accurate depiction of Caribbean life and communities She has said: "I've had to deal with race because of who I am and how I look. In that process, I've had to determine who I am. I do not think you can be all things to all people. As part of that process, I decided I was a Jamaican. I represent many different races and I'm not rejecting any of them to please anybody. I'm just who I am and you have to accept me or not."

Senior's experience of growing up between rural and urban Jamaica, as well as being immersed in the local oral traditions and traditional British literature simultaneously, greatly affected the themes of her stories. She strategically used her position as culturally "in between" and her extensive travels to create work that embodies a wide array of human experiences. In an interview with Dr Hyacinth M. Simpson of Toronto Metropolitan University, she states "...my stories reflect the society in which they are located. It is a pluralist society and I am trying to represent that pluralism in my work. The stories do demonstrate differences of race, class, culture, language as well as gender and age".

Her work has been adapted as drama and broadcast by the BBC and CBC, and she also wrote the radio play Window for the CBC. Her writing features in a wide range of anthologies including Her True-True Name (eds Elizabeth Wilson and Pamela Mordecai, 1989), Daughters of Africa (ed. Margaret Busby, 1992), The Heinemann Book of Caribbean Poetry (eds Ian McDonald and Stewart Brown, 1992), Concert of Voices: An Anthology of World Writing in English (ed. Victor J. Ramraj, 1994), The Year's Best Fantasy and Horror Tenth Annual Collection (eds Ellen Datlow and Terri Windling, 1997), The Wadsworth Anthology of Poetry (ed. Jay Parini, 2005), Best Poems on the Underground (eds Gerard Benson, Judith Chernaik and Cicely Herbert, 2010), So Much Things to Say: 100 Calabash Poets (2010), and numerous others.

Senior's work is taught in schools and universities internationally, with Summer Lightning and Gardening in the Tropics in particular being used as educational textbooks. Most recently, her poetry book Gardening in the Tropics has become a textbook on the CAPE syllabus in Caribbean schools, and has been on the International Baccalaureate syllabus. Senior’s work has also become a frequent subject of critical essays, as well as being translated into many languages such as Arabic, Spanish, Korean, and three South African languages.

== Translations ==
Recent translations include: ZigZag, translated into French by Christine Raguet, Geneva: Zoe, 2010; Eclairs de chaleur, translated into French by Christine Raguet, Geneva: Zoe, 2011, Depuis la Terrasse et autres nouvelles (translated into French by Marie-Annick Montout), special edition, Mauritius: L'Atelier d'écriture, 2011; Zomerweerlicht (trans. Marie Luyten), Netherlands: Ambo/Novib, 1991; Das Erscheinen der Schlangenfrau (trans. Wolfgang Binder) Germany: Dipa/Verlag, 1996, and Unionsverlag, 2003; a Book Club Selection, The Berne Declaration, Switzerland, 1996.

A bilingual (English and French) book of Senior's poetry, Un Pipirit M'a Dit/A Little Bird Told Me, was released in 2014.

Gardening in the Tropics was translated into Arabic by Mamoun Zaidei, published by NCCAL. KWAIT.2017

== Select awards and honours ==
- 1987: Commonwealth Writers' Prize, for Summer Lightning and Other Stories
- 1988: Silver Musgrave Medal
- 1994: Hawthornden Fellow, Scotland
- 1994–: Dana Distinguished Professor of Creative Writing and International Education, St. Lawrence University, Canton, NY
- 1995: F. G. Bressani Literary Prize for Gardening in the Tropics
- 2003: Norman Washington Manley Foundation Award for Excellence (preservation of cultural heritage – Jamaica)
- 2004: Gold Musgrave Medal of the Institute of Jamaica
- 2005: Humanities Scholar, University of the West Indies, Cave Hill, Barbados
- 2005: Over the Roofs of the World shortlisted for the Governor-General's Literary Award for Poetry
- 2005: Runner-up for the Casa de las Américas Prize
- 2006: Shell shortlisted for the Pat Lowther Award
- 2006: Ontario Arts Council and Canada Council works-in-progress grants
- 2011: Dancing Lessons shortlisted for the Amazon.ca First Novel Award, the Commonwealth Book Prize
- 2011: Isabel Sissons Canadian Children's Story Award
- 2015: OCM Bocas Prize for Caribbean Literature, winner of non-fiction category
- 2016: OCM Bocas Prize for Caribbean Literature, winner of fiction category and overall winner
- 2021: Appointed Poet Laureate of Jamaica
- 2024: Elected as Royal Society of Literature International Writer

== Select bibliography ==
Poetry collections

- Talking of Trees, Calabash, 1986
- Gardening in the Tropics, McClelland & Stewart, 1994
- Over the Roofs of the World, Insomniac Press, 2005
- Shell, Insomniac Press, 2007
- Pandemic Poems, 2021, ISBN 9781777452308
- Hurricane Watch, Carcanet Press, 2022. ISBN 9781800172166

Short story collections

- Summer Lightning and Other Stories, Longman, 1986. ISBN 9780582786271
- Arrival of the Snake-Woman, Longman, 1989. (Includes The Two Grandmothers). ISBN 9780582031708
- Discerner of Hearts, McClelland & Stewart, 1995. ISBN 9780771080548
- The Pain Tree, Cormorant, 2015. ISBN 9781770864344

Novels

- Dancing Lessons, Cormorant Books, 2011. ISBN 9781770860476
- Paradise Once, Akashic Books, 2025. ISBN 9781636142289

Children's literature

- Birthday Suit, Annick Press, 2012
- Anna Carries Water, Tradewind, 2013
- Boonoonoonous Hair, Tradewind, 2019

Non-fiction

- The Message Is Change: A Perspective on the 1972 General Elections, Kingston Publishers, 1972.
- Pop Story Gi Mi (four booklets on Jamaican heritage for schools), Ministry of Education (Kingston, Jamaica), 1973.
- A-Z of Jamaican Heritage, Heinemann and Gleaner Company Ltd, 1984.
- Working Miracles: Women's Lives in the English-Speaking Caribbean, Indiana University Press, 1991.
- Encyclopedia of Jamaican Heritage, Twin Guinep, 2004.
- Dying To Better Themselves: West Indians and the Building of the Panama Canal, University of the West Indies Press, 2014. ISBN 9789766404574
