= Kara Miller =

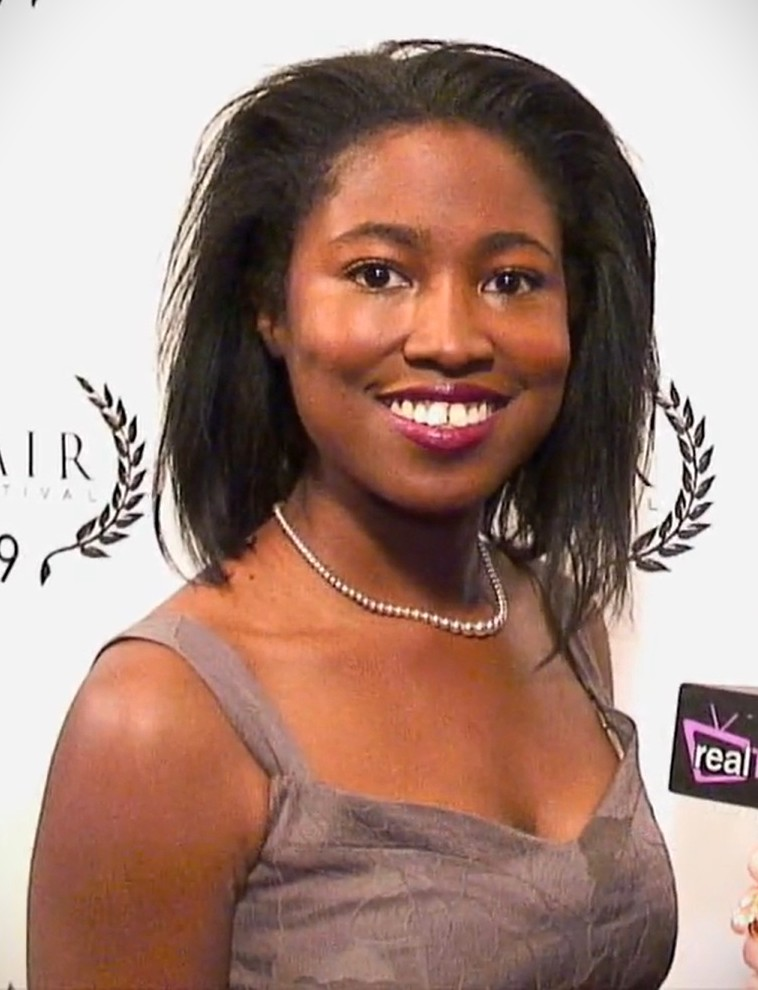
- Miller in 2009
- Born: Kara K. J. Miller; St. Andrew, Jamaica
- Occupation: Writer
- Years active: 2005–present
- Website: http://www.KaraMiller.com

Kara Miller is the creator of The Lifestylista. She is a writer and director working in film and television. She is also credited as K. J. Miller.

== Biography ==
Kara Miller was born in Jamaica. She attended Harrison College in Barbados, and graduated from the United World College of the Atlantic in the UK. She then attended Somerville College at Oxford.

Miller's directing credits include: Nobody The Great (Winner of Cinequest Film Festival's Viewers' Voice Audience Award for "Best Feature Film"); award-winning short films (Cheese Makes You Dream, Elephant Palm Tree and How to Make Friends) have been aired on HBO and the BBC and have screened at film festivals such as Sundance Film Festival, Berlin Film Festival and London Film Festival.

She was on the board of directors of the British Academy of Film and Television Arts BAFTA, Los Angeles.

Miller's writing credits include Boo! (BBC) and Jim Jam & Sunny (ITV). She also has numerous writing credits in theatre and BBC Radio 4 – Letting Yourself Go (White Open Spaces) was nominated for a South Bank Show Award.

Winner of a Breakthrough Brit Award and the Hitchcock Award, the Screen Nation "Best Emerging Talent" award and was shortlisted for the BBC's New Filmmaker Award.
