= Jacqueline Bishop =

Jamaican writer, visual artist, photographer

- Born: Kingston, Jamaica
- Education: Lehman College, City University of New York; Concordia University; Université de Paris; Maryland Institute College of Art
- Occupations: Writer, visual artist and photographer
- Writing career
- Notable awards: OCM Bocas Prize for Caribbean Literature
- Website: jacquelineabishop.com

Jacqueline Bishop is a writer, visual artist and photographer from Jamaica, who now lives in New York City, where she is a professor at the School of Liberal Studies at New York University (NYU). She is the founder of Calabash, an online journal of Caribbean art and letters, housed at NYU, and also writes for the Huffington Post and the Jamaica Observer Arts Magazine. In 2016 her book The Gymnast and Other Positions won the nonfiction category of the OCM Bocas Prize for Caribbean Literature. She is a contributor to the 2019 anthology New Daughters of Africa, edited by Margaret Busby.

== Biography ==
=== Early years and education ===
Jacqueline Bishop was born in Kingston, Jamaica. She lived with her grandmother and then mother, and when her mother migrated to the United States Bishop lived with her father. Bishop went to join her mother in the US for her college education, attending Lehman College, City University of New York, where she obtained a bachelor's degree in Psychology. She spent one summer studying French at Concordia University in Montréal, Canada, and she also spent a year in Paris, France, attending the Université de Paris. She studied with poet Sharon Olds and fiction writers Paule Marshall and Mary Gaitskill in the Graduate Creative Writing Program at New York University. In 2016, Bishop completed her MFA in Visual Arts at the Maryland Institute College of Art.

=== Career ===
Bishop's books include a novel, The River's Song (2007), two collections of poems, Fauna (2006) and Snapshots from Istanbul (2009), a 2007 art book entitled Writers Who Paint, Painters Who Write: 3 Three Jamaican Artists (which features the work of Earl McKenzie and Ralph Thompson, as well as her own work), and The Gymnast and Other Positions (2015), a collection of short stories, essays and interviews.

The Gymnast and Other Positions won the nonfiction category of the 2016 OCM Bocas Prize for Caribbean Literature, and was a runner-up for the overall category. The judges (chaired by Dionne Brand) said: "Bishop's mosaic of fragmented narratives is as original as it is insightful. Modern, spontaneous and formally innovative, it blurs the boundaries between the real and the imagined in a journey of self-discovery through the arts of the imagination in the Caribbean and elsewhere. The reader's pleasure is in negotiating the surprising detours and revealing digressions that The Gymnast invites us to follow." One reviewer wrote: "Bishop's short stories delight the imagination, even as they tug at the conscience. The breadth of perspective in the eleven brief narratives is particularly commendable. Though Bishop treats primarily with issues of womanhood (particularly Caribbean femininity) she also skilfully captures these experiences with fresh masculine eyes. ...Her visual fascination with looping stories over and through each other has spilled over to the written word, creating her own patchwork quilt of literature."

Other awards she has received include the Canute A. Brodhurst Prize for short-story writing, a year-long Fulbright grant to Morocco, a UNESCO/Fulbright Fellowship to Paris, the Arthur Schomburg Award for Excellence in the Humanities from New York University, a James Michener Creative Writing Fellowship and several awards from the Jamaica Cultural Development Commission.

Her short story "The Vanishing Woman" was included in the 2019 anthology New Daughters of Africa, edited by Margaret Busby. Bishop also writes for the Jamaica Observer. Her 2021 book The Gift of Music and Song collects together interviews with Jamaican women writers (Jean D'Costa, Hazel Campbell, Velma Pollard, Christine Craig, Marcia Douglas and Ann-Margaret Lim) originally published in the Jamaica Observer.

In 2000, Bishop founded Calabash, an online international literary journal with a strong visual arts component, "dedicated to publishing works encompassing, but not limited to, the Anglophone, Francophone, Hispanophone and Dutch-speaking Caribbean... presenting the arts and letters of those communities that have long been under-represented within the creative discourse of the region, among them: Aruba and the Netherlands Antilles, Maroon societies, and the Asian and Amerindian societies of the region."

Bishop writes a regular column on visual culture for the Huffington Post.

As a visual artist, she has shown her work at exhibitions internationally, including in Europe, North Africa, the United States and Jamaica. Her work has been described as "startling, not simply for its meticulous virtuosity, but also for its scope".

Bishop is currently Clinical Full Professor in the Liberal Studies Department at New York University.

== Visual art ==
Bishop's work has been exhibited widely, including within Jamaica, the United States, the United Kingdom, Belgium, Italy, Morocco, Cape Verde, Niger and other countries. In addition to her role as Clinical Full Professor at New York University, she was a 2020 Dora Maar/Brown Foundation Fellow in France. Bishop's recent work consists of brightly coloured bone China plates used symbolically in Caribbean homes and explores how they hid the violent legacy of slavery and colonialism in the Atlantic world.

She has stated:

"My work focuses on making visible the invisible, in making tangible the ephemeral, in speaking aloud the unspoken, and in voicing voicelessness. In so doing, I engage with such themes as pleasure, desire, sexuality, memory and exile (and their concomitant absence, loss, erasure and silence). My practice is interdisciplinary and increasingly trans-disciplinary. As someone who has lived longer outside of my birthplace of Jamaica, than I have lived on the island, I am acutely aware of what it means to be simultaneously an insider and an outsider. This ability to see the world from multiple psychological and territorial spaces has led to the development of a particular lens that allows me to view a given environment from a distance. Because I am also a fiction writer and poet as well as a visual artist, the text and narrative are significant parts of my artistic practice."

== Selected publications ==
- Fauna (poetry), Peepal Tree Press, 2006. ISBN 978-1845230326
- My Mother Who Is Me: Life Stories from Jamaican Women in New York, Africa World Press, 2006. ISBN 978-1592213443
- The River's Song (novel), Peepal Tree Press, 2007. ISBN 9781845230388
- Writers Who Paint, Painters Who Write: 3 Three Jamaican Artists, Peepal Tree Press, 2007. ISBN 978-1845230647
- Snapshots from Istanbul (poetry), Peepal Tree Press, 2009. ISBN 978-1845231149
- The Gymnast and other Positions (short stories, essays and interviews), Peepal Tree Press, 2015. ISBN 9781845233150
- The Gift of Music and Song: Interviews with Jamaican Women Writers, Peepal Tree Press, 2021. ISBN 9781845234768

== Awards ==
- 2017—Finalist, Kimbilio National Fiction Prize
- 2016--OCM Bocas Prize for Caribbean Literature, Non-Fiction Category
- 2014—Canute A. Brodhurst Prize, Short Fiction, The Caribbean Writer
- 2009—UNESCO/Fulbright Fellow, France
- 2008--Fulbright Fellow, Morocco
- 2000—The Arthur Schomburg Award for Excellence in the Humanities, New York University
- 1998—Jamaica Cultural Development Commission Awards (three awards in fiction and poetry)
- 1997—Jamaica Cultural Development Commission Awards (five awards in fiction and poetry)
- 1994—James Michener Creative Writing Fellowship
