= Patricia Powell =

Jamaican writer (born 1966)

Patricia Powell (born 1966) is a Jamaican writer, who has won awards for her novels.

== Biography ==
Born in Jamaica, she moved to the United States in her late teens. She received her bachelor's degree at Wellesley College, and an MFA in creative writing from Brown University, where she studied with Michael Ondaatje, among others.

She began her teaching career in 1991 in the English Department at the University of Massachusetts Boston. In 2001, Powell was the Briggs-Copeland Lecturer in Fiction at Harvard University. In 2003, she was announced as the Martin Luther King Jr. Visiting Professor of Creative Writing at MIT. Since 2009, she has been on the English faculty at Mills College.

Most of her work is not autobiographical, but explores personal themes of rejection, displacement, and healing through the lives of highly varied characters, ranging from a gay Jamaican man dying of AIDS, to a cross-dressing Chinese woman immigrant to Jamaica, to Nanny, a heroine of Jamaican independence.

== Literary awards ==
- Pen New England Discovery Award
- Bruce Rossley Literary Award
- Ferro-Grumley Award for fiction
- Lila Wallace Reader's Digest Writers Award
- YWCA Tribute to Outstanding Women Award

== Novels ==
- Me Dying Trial (1993) ISBN 0-435-98935-9
- The Pagoda: A Novel (1998) ISBN 0-679-45489-6
- A Small Gathering of Bones (2003) ISBN 0-8070-8367-4
- The Fullness of Everything (2009) ISBN 1-84523-113-9
