= Rachel Manley =

British-Jamaican writer in verse and prose

Rachel Manley (born 1947) is a Jamaican writer in verse and prose, born in Cornwall, England, raised in Jamaica and currently (as of August 2020) residing in Canada. She is a daughter of the former Jamaican prime minister, Michael Manley. She was briefly married to George Albert Harley de Vere Drummond, father of the film director Matthew Vaughn.

She edited her grandmother Edna Manley's diaries, which were published in 1989. She won the Governor General's Award for English-language non-fiction in 1997 for her memoir Drumblair: Memories of a Jamaican Childhood (1996). She has since published more memoirs and some volumes of verse. Her other biographical works include Horses in Her Hair: A Granddaughter's Story (2008), In My Father's Shade (2004) and Slipstream (2000). In 2025 she co-authored with her son, Drum Manley Drummond, George the Last, a biography of George Albert Harley DeVere Drummond.

She published her first novel, The Black Peacock, in 2017. The book was a shortlisted finalist for the 2018 Amazon.ca First Novel Award.

== Selected bibliography ==
- A Light Left On (poetry), 1992
- Drumblair: Memories of a Jamaican Childhood (memoir), 1996
- Slipstream, 2000
- In My Father's Shade, 2004
- Horses in Her Hair: A Granddaughter's Story, 2008
- The Black Peacock (novel), 2017
- "George the Last", 2025
