= Tanya Shirley =

Jamaican poet (born 1976)

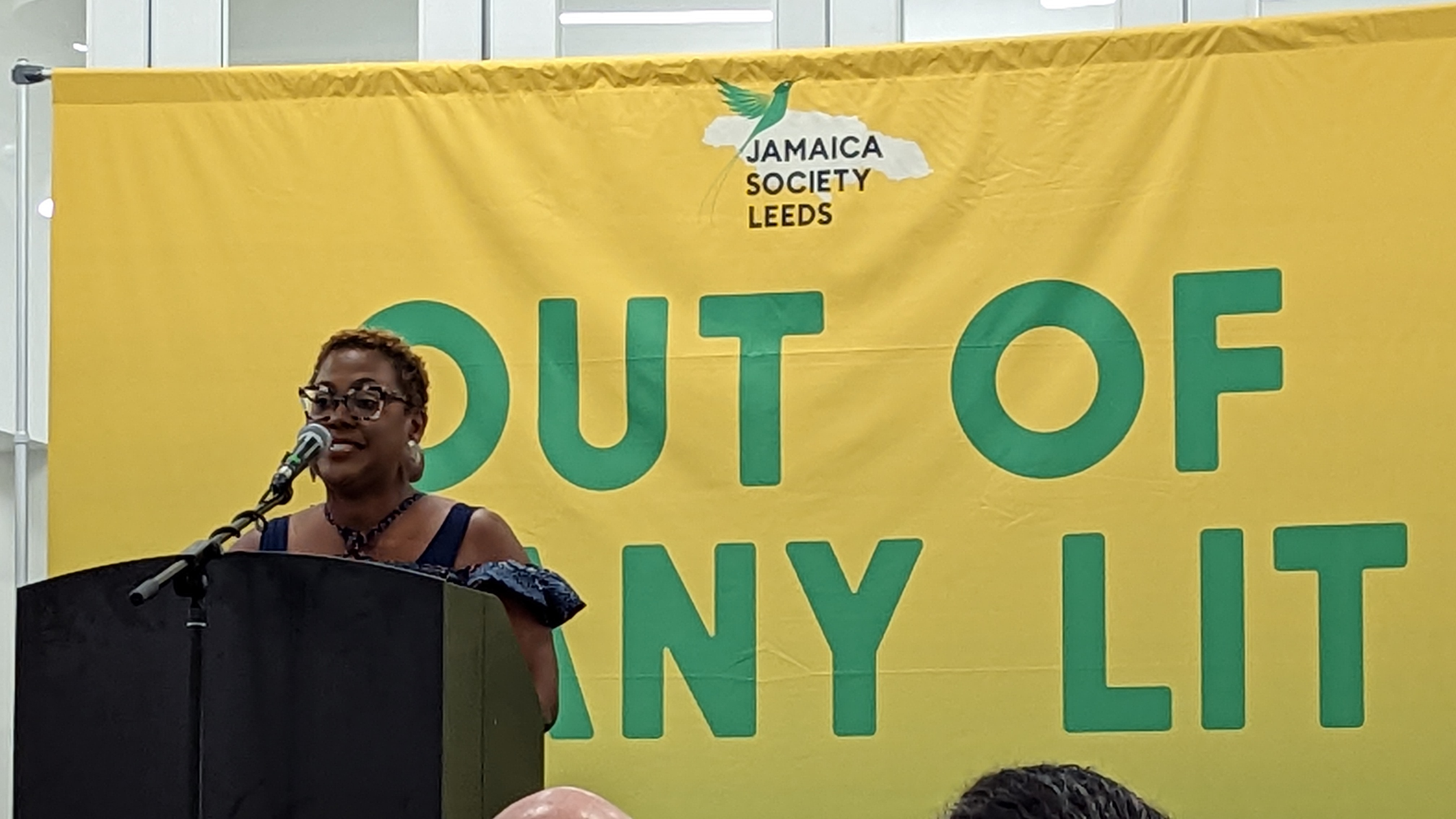
- Shirley at Out of Many Lit Fest in Leeds, England)
- Born: 1976 (age 49–50); Jamaica
- Education: University of the West Indies; University of Maryland
- Occupation: Poet
- Notable work: She Who Sleeps With Bones (2009)
- Website: tanyashirley.com

Tanya Shirley (born 1976) is a Jamaican poet.

== Life ==
Tanya Shirley was born in Jamaica in 1976. She attended high school in Canada before returning to Jamaica to study at the University of the West Indies (UWI), where she switched from studying social science to studying English literature. She later gained an MFA in creative writing from the University of Maryland. She teaches in the Department of Literatures as an adjunct lecturer at UWI, Mona.

Shirley's debut poetry collection, She Who Sleeps With Bones (2009), was a best-seller in Jamaica.

In 2017, she married Alan Johnstone, a financial investigator.

== Works ==
- She Who Sleeps with Bones. Leeds, UK: Peepal Tree Press, 2009.
- The Merchant of Feathers. Leeds: Peepal Tree, 2014.
