= Hazel Campbell =

Jamaican writer (1940–2018)

- Born: Hazel Dorothy Campbell; 1940; Jamaica
- Died: 12 December 2018 (aged 78); Kingston, Jamaica
- Education: University of the West Indies
- Writing career
- Genres: Short stories and children's literature

Hazel Campbell (1940 – 12 December 2018) was a Jamaican writer, notably of short stories and children's books, who was also a teacher, editor and public relations worker.

== Biography ==
Hazel Dorothy Campbell was born in Jamaica, where she attended Merl Grove High School in Kingston. She subsequently earned a BA degree in English & Spanish at the University of the West Indies, Mona, followed by diplomas in Mass Communications and Management Studies. She worked as a teacher, as a public relations worker, editor, features writer and video producer for the Jamaican Information Service, the Ministry of Foreign Affairs and the Creative Production and Training Centre. From 1987 she freelanced as a communications consultant.

Her first published book, in 1978, was The Rag Doll & Other Stories, and she went on to become one of the most prolific writers produced by Jamaica. She was particularly noted for her children's books, and the Jamaica Gleaner stated: "Campbell had an in-depth understanding of children and demonstrated giftedness in crafting material that engaged their attention in literature." Her short stories appeared in publications including West Indian Stories (ed. John Wickham, 1981), Caribanthology I (ed. Bruce St. John, 1981), Focus 1983; Facing the Sea (ed. Anne Walmsley, 1986); and When de Mark Buss: Black British and Caribbean Short Stories (2001).

Reviewing her 1991 story collection Singerman, Keith Jardim wrote: "The excellence of Hazel D. Campbell’s short stories lies not only in the bright, robust prose of her third and latest collection, Singerman, but also in her portrayals of the preoccupations of the Caribbean people, race, class, and poverty – how they have cursed the region. ... all of these stories are beautifully written, wise, and sweeping in moral concerns."

Campbell died on 12 December 2018, aged 78, at the University Hospital of the West Indies in Kingston, following a brief illness. A collection of her short stories, Jamaica On My Mind, was posthumously published in 2019, and Suzanne Scafe noted in Small Axe: "Reading Campbell's earliest stories three and four decades later, one is astonished at the prescient ways sexuality, gender relations, and the nuanced forms of the women characters’ resistance are represented."

== Selected bibliography ==
- The Rag Doll & Other Stories (Savacou, 1978) OCLC 5857249
- Woman’s Tongue (Savacou, 1985)
- Singerman (short stories; Peepal Tree, 1991, ISBN 9780948833441)
- Tilly Bummie and Other Stories (1993)
- Miss Bettina's House (Carlong, 2004, ISBN 9766380694)
- Jamaica On My Mind: New and Collected Stories, introduction by Jacqueline Bishop (Peepal Tree Press, 2019, ISBN 9781845234409, 346pp.)
