= H. G. de Lisser =

Jamaican journalist and author (1878–1944)

H. G. de Lisser CMG
- Born: Herbert George de Lisser; 9 December 1878; Falmouth, Trelawny Parish, Colony of Jamaica
- Died: 19 May 1944 (aged 65)
- Education: Collegiate School
- Occupations: novelist; playwright; editor; journalist

Herbert George de Lisser CMG (9 December 1878 – 19 May 1944) was a Jamaican journalist and author. He has been described as 'one of the most conspicuous figures in the history of West Indian literature'.

== Early life and education ==
H. G. de Lisser was born on 9 December 1878 in Falmouth, Trelawny Parish, Jamaica, to parents of Afro-Jewish descent; and attended the Collegiate School in Kingston.

== Career ==
He started work at the Institute of Jamaica at the age of 14. Three years later he joined the Jamaica Daily Gleaner, of which his father was editor, as a proofreader, and two years later became a reporter on the Jamaica Times. In 1903, de Lisser became assistant editor of The Gleaner and was editor within the year. He wrote several articles for the paper every day.

In 1909, he published a collection of essays, In Cuba and Jamaica, and published his second book, Twentieth Century Jamaica, in 1912. He went on to produce a novel or work of non-fiction annually. His first work of fiction, Jane: A Story of Jamaica, is significant for being the first West Indian novel to have a central black character. Another famous novel of his, The White Witch of Rosehall (1929), is linked to a legend of a haunting in Jamaica; de Lisser also wrote several plays. In December 1920, he began publishing an annual magazine, Planters' Punch.

== Other activities and honours ==
De Lisser devoted much time and effort to the revival of the Jamaican sugar industry and represented Jamaica at a number of sugar conferences around the world. He was also general secretary of the Jamaica Imperial Association, honorary president of the Jamaica Press Association, and chairman of the West Indian section of the Empire Press Union.

He was appointed Companion of the Order of St Michael and St George (CMG) in the 1920 New Year Honours.

== Selected bibliography ==
- In Jamaica and Cuba (1910), Kingston: Gleaner Co.
- Jane: A Story of Jamaica (1913), Kingston: Gleaner Co.
- Twentieth Century Jamaica (1913), Kingston, Jamaica Times.
- Jane's Career: A Story of Jamaica (1914), London: Methuen.
- Susan Proudleigh (1915), London: Methuen.
- Jamaica and the Great War (1917), Kingston: Gleaner Co.
- Triumphant Squalitone: A Tropical Extravaganza (1917), Kingston: Gleaner Co.
- Revenge: A Tale of Old Jamaica (1919), Kingston: Gleaner Co.
- The White Witch of Rosehall (1929), London: E. Benn. (Originally published in Planters' Punch)
- Under the Sun: A Jamaican Comedy (1937), London: E. Benn.
- Psyche (1952), London: E. Benn.
- Morgan's Daughter (1953), London: E. Benn.
- The Cup and the Lip (1956), London: E. Benn.
- The Arawak Girl (1958), Kingston: Pioneer Press.
