= Pamela Mordecai =

Jamaican writer and scholar (born 1942)

- Born: Pamela Claire Mordecai; 1942 (age 83–84); Kingston, Jamaica
- Education: Newton College of the Sacred Heart; University of the West Indies (PhD)
- Occupations: Poet, novelist, short-story writer, scholar and anthologist
- Awards: Bronze Musgrave Medal from the Institute of Jamaica
- Website: pamelamordecai.ca

Pamela Claire Mordecai (born 1942) is a Jamaican-born poet, novelist, short story writer, scholar and anthologist who lives in Canada.

== Biography ==
Born in Kingston, Jamaica, she attended high school in Jamaica, and Newton College of the Sacred Heart in Newton, Massachusetts, where she did a first degree in English. A trained language-arts teacher with a PhD in English from the University of the West Indies, she has taught at secondary and tertiary levels, trained teachers, edited an academic journal, and worked in media, especially television, and in publishing.

Mordecai has written articles on Caribbean literature, education and publishing, and has collaborated on, or herself written, more than 30 books, including textbooks, children's books, six books of poetry for adults, a collection of short fiction, a novel, and (with her husband, Martin Mordecai) a reference work on Jamaica. She has edited several anthologies, including the Sunsong series. Her poems and stories for children are widely collected and have been used in textbooks in the UK, Canada, the US, West Africa, the Caribbean and Malaysia. Her short stories have been published in journals and anthologies in the Caribbean, the US and Canada. Her poetry was included in the 1992 anthology Daughters of Africa.

Mordecai has lived in Canada since 1994, but the Caribbean experience, both in the region and in the diaspora, continues to be an important preoccupation in her writing. Her play El Numero Uno had its world premiere in February 2010 at the Lorraine Kimsa Theatre for Young People in Toronto, Canada.

In 2013, she was awarded a Bronze Musgrave Medal by the Institute of Jamaica. In spring 2014, she was a fellow at Yaddo artists' community in Saratoga Springs, New York.

Some of her works are written in Jamaican creole.

== Works ==
- Jamaica Woman (ed., with Mervyn Morris) (1980), anthology. ISBN 0-435-98600-7.
- New Caribbean Junior Reader 3 (with Grace Walker Gordon) (1985, new edition 2004). ISBN 0-602-22675-9.
- New Caribbean Junior Reader 4 (with Grace Walker Gordon) (1986, new edition 2004). ISBN 0-602-22676-7.
- Journey Poem (1987), poetry. ISBN 976-8001-17-8
- New Caribbean Infant Reader 1 (with Grace Walker Gordon) (1987). ISBN 978-0-602-26961-6.
- From Our Yard: Jamaican Poetry since Independence (ed.) (1987), anthology. ISBN 976-8017-04-X.
- Story Poems: a first collection (1987), poetry for children. ISBN 0-602-22876-X.
- Her True-True Name (ed., with Elizabeth Wilson) (1989), anthology. ISBN 0-435-98906-5.
- Don't Ever Wake a Snake (1991), poems and stories for children. ISBN 976-8070-07-2.
- Sunsong Tide Rising (ed., with Grace Walker Gordon) (1994) anthology. ISBN 0-582-08690-6.
- de Man: a performance poem (1995), poetry. ISBN 0-920813-23-2.
- Ezra's Goldfish and other storypoems (1995), poetry for children. ISBN 978-976-8139-59-7.
- Rohan Goes to Big School (2000), story for children. ISBN 978-0-19-915863-8.
- The Costume Parade (2000), story for children. ISBN 978-0-19-915865-2.
- Certifiable (2001), poetry. ISBN 0-86492-295-7.
- Culture and Customs of Jamaica (with Martin Mordecai) (2001). ISBN 0-313-30534-X.
- The True Blue of Islands (2005), poetry. ISBN 1-894528-01-8.
- Calling Cards: New Poetry from Caribbean/Canadian Women (ed.) (2005). ISBN 1-894528-02-6.
- Pink Icing and other stories (2006), short stories. ISBN 978-1-897178-32-4.
- El Numero Uno, play commissioned by the Young People's Theatre, world premiere in Toronto, Canada, in 2010.
- New Junior English Revised (with Haydn Richards and Grace Walker Gordon) (2012). ISBN 978-1-4082-8259-5.
- Subversive Sonnets (2012), poetry. ISBN 978-1-894770-94-1.
- Red Jacket: a novel (2015), fiction, ISBN 978-1459729407.
- de book of Mary: a performance poem (2015), poetry, ISBN 978-1927494684
