= Kwame Dawes =

Ghanaian poet, academic, editor, critic (born 1962)

Kwame Dawes CD Hon. FRSL
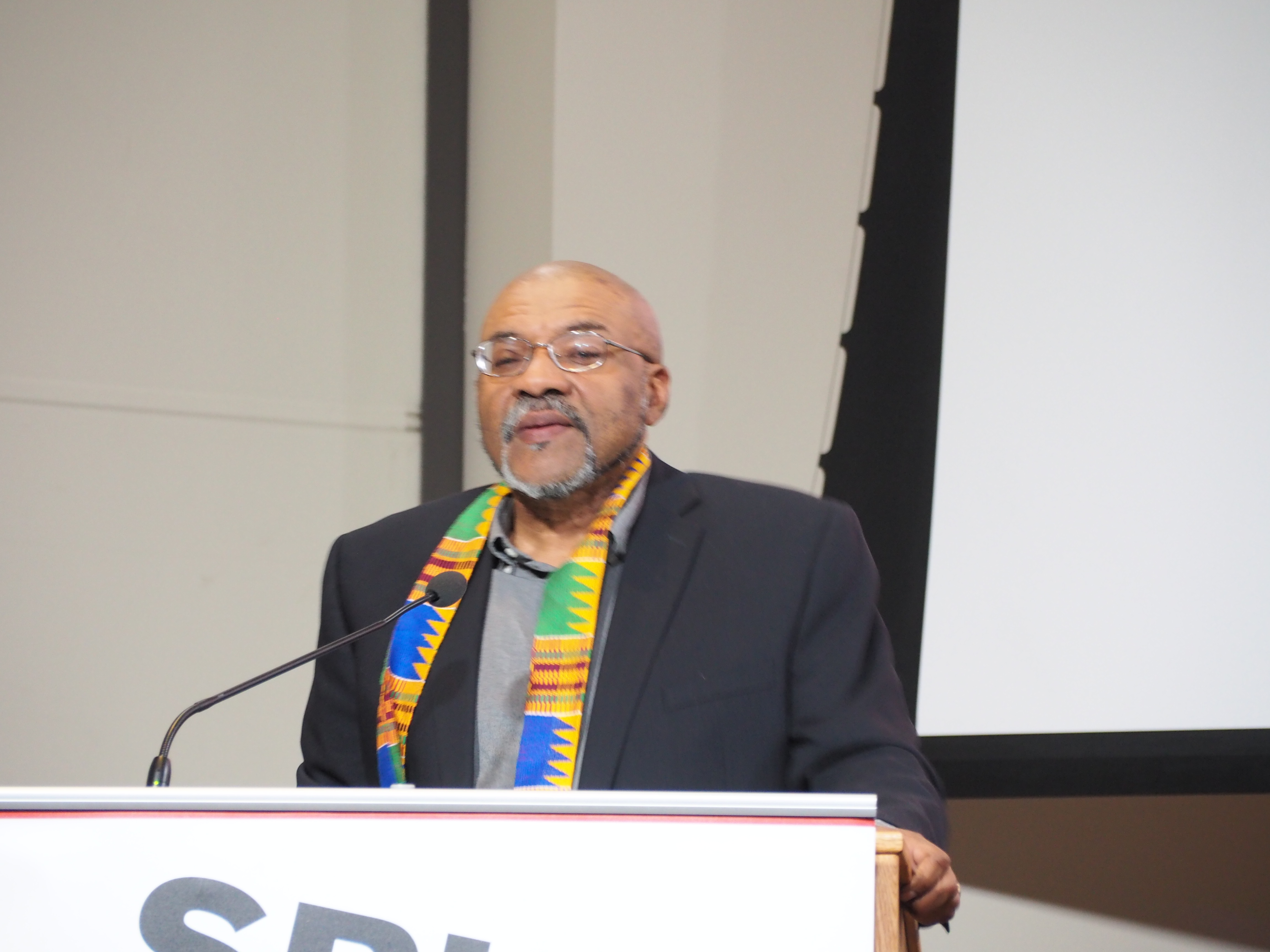
- Dawes at Split This Rock, 2018
- Born: Kwame Senu Neville Dawes; 28 July 1962 (age 64); Ghana
- Education: University of the West Indies (BA); University of New Brunswick (PhD)
- Occupations: Poet; documentary writer; editor; critic
- Relatives: Neville Dawes (father)
- Website: kwamedawes.com

Kwame Senu Neville Dawes CD Hon. FRSL (born 28 July 1962) is a Ghanaian poet, academic, critic, actor, and musician. He is the former Louis Frye Scudder Professor of Liberal Arts at the University of South Carolina and former Professor of English at the University of Nebraska–Lincoln. He was appointed Professor of Literary Arts at Brown University in 2024. He is series editor of the African Poetry Book Series and director of the African Poetry Book Fund. He was editor-in-chief at Prairie Schooner magazine from 2011 until 2025.

He has published thirty books of poetry, as well as works of fiction, essays, and criticism. His awards include the Forward Poetry Prize, the Commonwealth Writers Prize, a 2009 Emmy Award, the Barnes & Noble Writers for Writers Award, Brittle Paper's literary person of the year award, the Windham-Campbell Prize in 2019, and the National Books Critics Circle Award for Poetry in 2025. He is a Chancellor Emeritus of the Academy of American Poets and was elected an honorary Fellow of the Royal Society of Literature in 2018. In April 2024, Dawes was announced as the new Poet Laureate of Jamaica.

== Biography ==
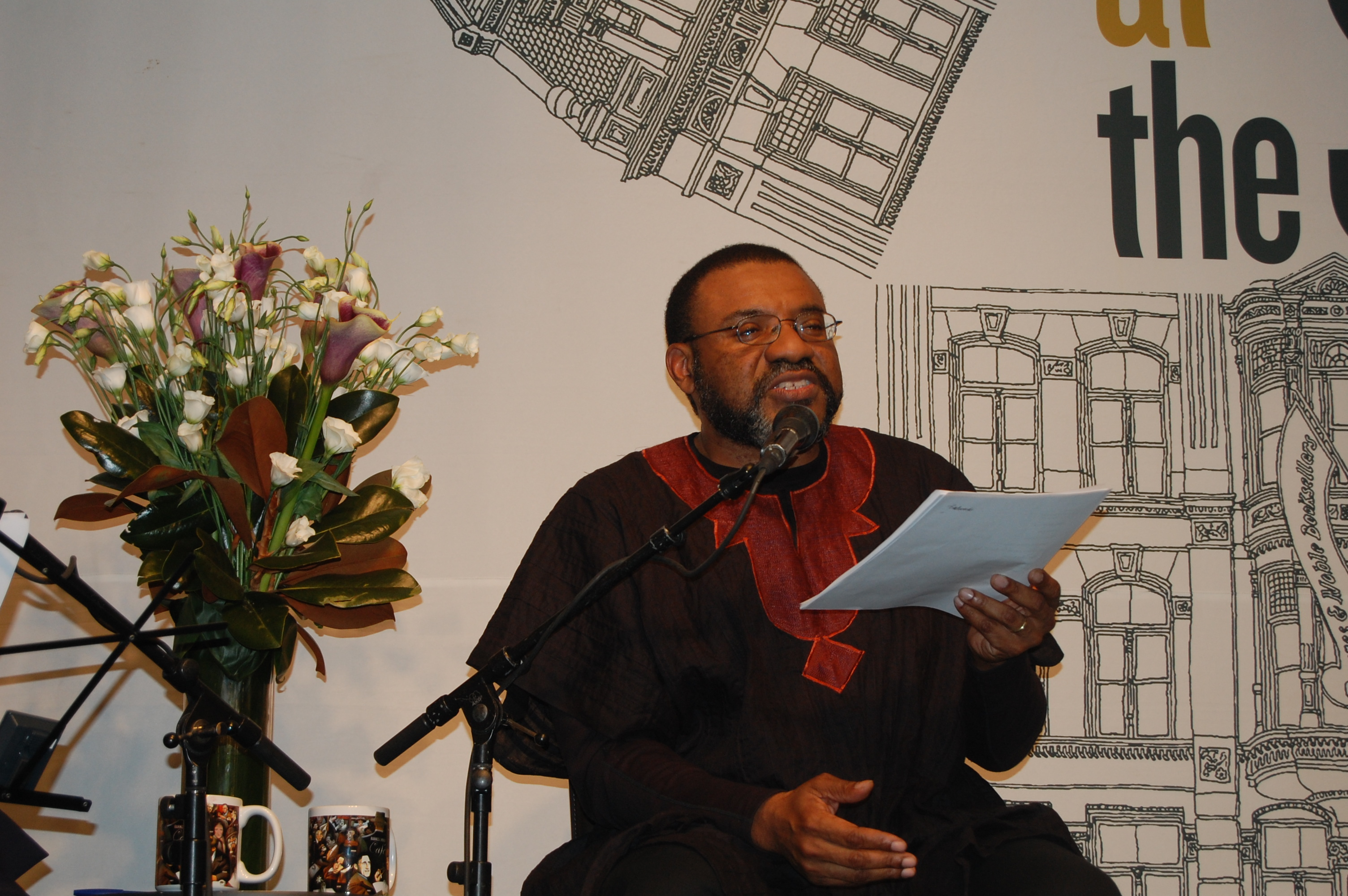
Dawes at a reading in 2010.

=== Early years and education ===
Kwame Dawes was born in Ghana in 1962 to Sophia and Neville Dawes, and in 1971 the family moved to Kingston, Jamaica, when Neville Dawes became deputy director of the Institute of Jamaica. Growing up in Jamaica, Kwame Dawes attended Jamaica College and the University of the West Indies at Mona, where he received a BA degree in 1983. He studied and taught in New Brunswick, Canada, on a Commonwealth Scholarship. In 1992, he earned a PhD in Comparative Literature from the University of New Brunswick, where he was editor-in-chief of the student newspaper, The Brunswickan.

=== Career ===
From 1992 to 2012, Dawes taught at the University of South Carolina (USC) as a Professor in English, Distinguished Poet in Residence, Director of the South Carolina Poetry Initiative, and Director of the USC Arts Institute. He was also the faculty advisor for the publication Yemassee.

He won the 1994 Forward Poetry Prize, Best First Collection for Progeny of Air.

He was a Chancellor's Professor of English at the University of Nebraska–Lincoln, a faculty member of Cave Canem Foundation, and a teacher in the Pacific MFA program in Oregon.

Dawes collaborated with San Francisco-based writer and composer Kevin Simmonds on Wisteria: Twilight Songs from the Swamp Country, which debuted at London's Royal Festival Hall in 2006, and featured sopranos Valetta Brinson and Valerie Johnson.

In 2009, Dawes won an Emmy Award in the category of New Approaches to News & Documentary Programming: Arts, Lifestyle & Culture. His project documented HIV/AIDS in Jamaica, interspersed with poetry, photography by Andre Lambertson, and music by Kevin Simmonds. The website Livehopelove.com is the culmination of his project. Dawes is director of the Calabash International Literary Festival, a yearly event in Jamaica.

In 2011, Dawes became editor of literary journal Prairie Schooner, a post he held until 2025.

New York-based Poets & Writers named Dawes as a recipient of the 2011 Barnes & Noble Writers for Writers Award, which recognises writers who have given generously to other writers or to the broader literary community.

In 2012, the African Poetry Book Fund was established, with Dawes as the founding editor. He and five other internationally regarded poets serve on the reading board to annually publish the winning manuscript of the Sillerman First Book Prize for African Poets, a new and selected/collected volume by a major living African poet, the New-Generation African Poets Chapbook Boxset (comprising collected chapbooks of emerging writers, with special emphasis on those who have not yet published a full-length collection), and contemporary works of new poetry by select African poets (solicited and unsolicited manuscripts). The Fund also administers the Glenna Luschei Prize for African Poetry, the only pan-African prize for a collection of poetry.

In 2016, the event Respect Due: Symposium on the Work of Kwame Dawes featured participants including Rachel Eliza Griffiths, Honorée Fanonne Jeffers, Shara McCallum, Vladimir Lucien, Ishion Hutchinson, Linton Kwesi Johnson, John Robert Lee, and Lorna Goodison. Goodison in her contribution described him by saying: "...he is the embodiment of the African Jamaican, born as he was of Ghanaian and Jamaican parents, and he moves with ease and authority between multiple worlds. Everything about Kwame’s art is multi-dimensional."

In 2018, Dawes was elected a Chancellor of the Academy of American Poets. In the same year, he was made an honorary Fellow of the Royal Society of Literature for significant contribution to the advancement of literature.

In 2019, he was one of the eight recipients of the Windham–Campbell Prize, alongside Ishion Hutchinson (Jamaica), Danielle McLaughlin (Ireland), David Chariandy (Canada), Raghu Karnad (India), Rebecca Solnit (US), Young Jean Lee (US) and Patricia Cornelius (Australia).

In 2021, Dawes succeeded Ted Kooser as host of the news column American Life in Poetry.

In 2022, he was named "literary Person of the Year" by African literary blog Brittle Paper, an honour that "recognizes an individual who has done outstanding work in advancing the African literary industry and culture in the given year".

In April 2024, Dawes was named as poet laureate of Jamaica, with a three-year tenure.

Also in 2024, Dawes joined the faculty of Brown University, becoming Professor of Literary Arts.

== Awards and honours ==
- 1994: Forward Poetry Prize (Best First Collection)
- 1996: Individual Artist Fellowship
- 2000: Poetry Business Prize
- 2000: Hollis Summers Poetry Prize
- 2001: Pushcart Prize for Poetry (US)
- 2003: Commonwealth Writers Prize (Caribbean and Canada Region, Best First Book)
- 2009: Emmy Award – New Approaches to News & Documentary Programming: Arts, Lifestyle & Culture
- 2018: Honorary Fellow of the Royal Society of Literature
- 2019: Windham–Campbell Literature Prize in Poetry.
- 2022: Order of Distinction (Commander Class); Brittle Paper's Literary Person of the Year
- 2024–2027: Poet laureate of Jamaica
- 2025: National Books Critics Circle Award for Poetry for his poetry book, "Sturge Town"

== Works ==
=== Poetry ===
- Progeny of Air, Peepal Tree Press, 1994, ISBN 978-0-948833-68-7
- Resisting the Anomie, Fredericton, 1995, ISBN 978-0-864921-47-5
- Prophets, Peepal Tree Press, 1995, ISBN 978-0-948833-85-4
- Jacko Jacobus, Peepal Tree Press, 1996, ISBN 978-1-900715-06-5
- Requiem, Peepal Tree Press, 1996, ISBN 978-1-900715-07-2
- Shook Foil, Peepal Tree Press, 1997, ISBN 978-1-900715-14-0
- Map-Maker Smith/Doorstop Books, 2000, ISBN 978-1-902382-18-0
- Midland. Ohio University Press. 2001. ISBN 978-0-8214-1356-2. "Kwame Senu Neville Dawes."
- New and Selected Poems, 1994–2002, Peepal Tree Press, 2003, ISBN 978-1-900715-70-6
- Bruised Totems, Parallel Press Madison, 2004, ISBN 978-1-893311-48-0
- I Saw Your Face, with Tom Feelings, Dial Books, 2005, ISBN 978-0-803718-94-4
- Wisteria: Twilight Songs from the Swamp Country, Red Hen Press, 2006, ISBN 978-1-597090-59-9
- Impossible Flying, Peepal Tree Press, 2007, ISBN 978-1-845230-39-5
- Gomer's Song. Akashic Books. 2007. ISBN 978-1-933354-44-6.
- Hope's Hospice, Peepal Tree Press, 2009, ISBN 978-1-845230-78-4
- Back of Mount Peace, Peepal Tree Press, 2009, ISBN 978-1-84523-124-8
- Wheels, Peepal Tree Press, 2010, ISBN 978-1-84523-142-2
- Duppy Conqueror: New and Selected Poems, Copper Canyon Press, 2013, ISBN 978-1-55659-423-6
- Speak from Here to There, with John Kinsella, Peepal Tree Press, 2016, ISBN 978-1-845233-19-8
- City of Bones: A Testament, Northwestern University Press, 2017, ISBN 978-0810134-62-1

=== Novels ===
- She's Gone. Akashic Books. 2007. ISBN 978-1-933354-18-7.
- Bivouac, Peepal Tree Press Ltd, 2010, ISBN 978-1-84523-105-7

=== Short stories ===
- A Place to Hide and Other Stories, Peepal Tree Press, 2003, ISBN 978-1-900715-48-5

=== Non fiction ===
- Natural Mysticism: Towards a Reggae Aesthetic, Peepal Tree Press, 1999, ISBN 978-1-900715-22-5
- Bob Marley: Lyrical Genius, Sanctuary, 2002, ISBN 978-1-86074-433-4
- A Far Cry from Plymouth Rock: A Personal Narrative, Peepal Tree Press, 2007, ISBN 978-1-845230-25-8

=== Plays ===
- One Love. Methuen. 2001. ISBN 978-0-413-76530-7.

=== Editor ===
- Wheel and Come Again: An anthology of Reggae Poetry. Goose Lane Editions. 1998.
- Twenty South Carolina Poetry Fellows. Hub City Press. 2005. ISBN 978-1891885-39-6.
- Red: Contemporary Black British Poetry. Peepal Tree Press. 2009. ISBN 978-1-84523-129-3.
- Fugue and Other Writings. Peepal Tree Press. 2009. ISBN 978-1845231-09-5.
- (with Colin Channer) So Much Things to Say: 100 Poets from the First Ten Years of the Calabash International Literary Festival. Akashic Books. 2010. ISBN 978-1-936070-07-7.
- Home Is Where: An Anthology of African American Poetry from the Carolinas. Hub City Press. 2011. ISBN 978-1891885-80-8.
- (with Jeremy Poynting) Hold Me To an Island: Caribbean Place: An Anthology of Writing. Peepal Tree Press. 2011. ISBN 978-1-84523-163-7.
- Jubilation!: Poems Celebrating 50 Years of Jamaican Independence. Peepal Tree Press. 2012. ISBN 978-1845232-04-7.
- Seven Strong: Winners of the South Carolina Poetry Book Prize, 2006–2012. University of South Carolina Press. 2012. ISBN 978-1-61117-093-1.
- (with Marianne Kunkel and James Englehardt) The Prairie Schooner Book Prize: Tenth Anniversary Reader. University of Nebraska Press. 2013. ISBN 978-0803240-43-8.
- (with Marjory Wentworth) Seeking: Poetry and Prose Inspired by the Art of Jonathan Green. University of South Carolina Press. 2013. ISBN 978-1611170-92-4.
- (with Chris Abani) Eight New Generation African Poets: A Chapbook Boxset. Akashic Books/African Poetry Book Fund. 2015. ISBN 978-1617753-55-8.
- (With Chris Abani) New-Generation African Poets: A Chapbook Box Set – Tatu. Akashic Books/African Poetry Book Fund. 2016. ISBN 978-1617754-51-7.
- Kwame Dawes, ed. (2016). When the Rewards Can Be So Great: Essays on Writing and the Writing Life. Pacific University Press. ISBN 978-0988482-74-6.
- Kwame Dawes, ed. (2016). A Bloom of Stones: A Tri-lingual Anthology of Haitian Poems After the Earthquake. Peepal Tree Press. ISBN 978-1845231-92-7.
- (with Matthew Shenoda) Bearden's Odyssey: Poets Respond to the Art of Romare Bearden. Northwestern University Press. 2017. ISBN 978-0810134-89-8.
- (with Chris Abani) New-Generation African Poets: A Chapbook Box Set – Nne. Akashic Books/African Poetry Book Fund. 2017. ISBN 978-1617755-40-8.
- (with Chris Abani) New-Generation African Poets: A Chapbook Box Set – Tano. Akashic Books/African Poetry Book Fund. 2018. ISBN 978-1617756-23-8.

=== South Carolina Poetry Book Prize ===
Dawes established the South Carolina Poetry Initiative's annual book prize competition, and edited the winning manuscripts.

- Koets, Julia (2012). Hold like Owls. University of South Carolina Press. ISBN 978-1-61117-084-9.
- Pournelle, Jennifer (2011). Excavations: A City Cycle. University of South Carolina Press. ISBN 978-1-61117-093-1.
- Evans, Worthy (2010). Green Revolver. University of South Carolina Press. ISBN 978-1-57003-932-4.
- Dameron, DéLana R. A. (2009). How God Ends Us. University of South Carolina Press. ISBN 978-1-57003-832-7.
- Madden, Ed (2008). Signals. University of South Carolina Press. ISBN 978-1-57003-750-4.
- McManus, Ray (2007). Driving Through the Country Before You Are Born. University of South Carolina Press. ISBN 978-1-57003-702-3.
- Meyers, Susan (2006). Keep and Give Away. University of South Carolina Press. ISBN 978-1-57003-670-5.

=== African Poetry Book Fund ===
Dawes is the founding editor of the African Poetry Book Fund (APBF). The series itself was started in 2014 and established through the generosity of Laura Sillerman and Robert F. X. Sillerman. The goal of the APBF is to promote and publicize "the poetic arts through its book series, contests, workshops, and seminars and through its collaborations with publishers, festivals, booking agents, colleges, universities, conferences and all other entities that share an interest in the poetic arts of Africa."

- (Co-editor with Chris Abani) New-Generation African Poets: A Chapbook Box Set – Tano. Akashic Books. 2018. ISBN 978-1617756-23-8.
- (with Chris Abani) New-Generation African Poets: A Chapbook Box Set – Nne. Akashic Books. 2017. ISBN 978-1617755-40-8.
- New-Generation African Poets: A Chapbook Box Set – Tatu. Akashic Books. 2016. ISBN 978-1-61775-451-7.
- (with Chris Abani) Eight New-Generation African Poets: A Chapbook Box Set. Akashic Books. 2015. ISBN 978-1-61775-355-8.
- (with Chris Abani) Seven New-Generation African Poets: A Chapbook Box Set. Slapering Hol Press. 2014. ISBN 978-1-94064-658-9.

== See also ==
- Caribbean literature
- Caribbean poetry
- American literature
