= Mervyn Morris =

Jamaican academic and poet (born 1937)

The Honourable Mervyn Morris OM
- Born: Mervyn Eustace Morris; 21 February 1937 (age 89); Kingston, Colony of Jamaica, British Empire
- Education: Munro College; University College of the West Indies (BA); St Edmund Hall, Oxford (MA)
- Occupations: Poet and academic
- Known for: Poet Laureate of Jamaica (2014–2017)
- Awards: Rhodes Scholarship; Bocas Henry Swanzy Award

Mervyn Eustace Morris OM (born 21 February 1937) is a poet, writer, editor and professor emeritus at the University of the West Indies, Mona, Jamaica. His poetry is well respected throughout the Caribbean, which has consistently ranked him among the top West Indian poets. He was also one of the first academics to espouse the importance of nation language in helping to define in verse important aspects of Jamaican culture. Morris was Poet Laureate of Jamaica from 2014 to 2017.

== Biography ==
Mervyn Morris was born in Kingston, Jamaica, and attended Munro College. He went on to study at the University College of the West Indies (UWI) and as a Rhodes Scholar at St Edmund Hall, Oxford. In 1970, he began lecturing at UWI, where he went on to be appointed a Reader in West Indian Literature. In 1992, he was a UK Arts Council Visiting Writer-in-Residence at the South Bank Centre. He lives in Kingston, Jamaica, where he is Professor Emeritus of Creative Writing & West Indian Literature.

In 2009, Morris was awarded the Jamaican Order of Merit.

On 15 April 2014, Morris was announced as the Poet Laureate of Jamaica, the first to be accorded the title since the country's independence (the previous holders being Tom Redcam, who was appointed posthumously in 1933, and J. E. Clare McFarlane, appointed in 1953). The investiture ceremony took place at King's House on 22 May 2014.

In March 2021, Morris was announced as the co-recipient, together with Edward Baugh, of the 2021 Bocas Henry Swanzy Award.

== Works ==
Morris has published several volumes of poetry, and has edited the works of other Caribbean writers. His collections include The Pond (revised edition, New Beacon Books, 1997), Shadowboxing (New Beacon Books, 1979), Examination Centre (New Beacon Books, 1992) and On Holy Week (a sequence of poems for radio, Dangaroo Press, 1993). He also edited The Faber Book of Contemporary Caribbean Short Stories (1990) and published "Is English We Speaking", and Other Essays (Ian Randle Publishers, 1999). In 2006, Carcanet Press published his I been there, sort of: New and Selected Poems.

The best known poems by Morris include: "Little Boy Crying", "Family Pictures", "Love Is", "One, Two", "Home", "The Roaches", "The Pond" and "Critic".

== Selected bibliography ==
=== Poetry ===
- The Pond – New Beacon Books, 1973. ISBN 978-0901241160 (hb
- On Holy Week – Dangaroo Press, 1976. ISBN 978-1871049671 (pb)
- Shadow Boxing – New Beacon Books, 1979. ISBN 978-0901241344 (pb)
- Examination Centre – New Beacon Books, 1992. ISBN 978-1873201091 (pb)
- I Been There, Sort Of: New and Selected Poems – Carcanet Press, 2006. ISBN 978-1857548297 (pb)

=== Non-fiction ===
- "Is English We Speaking", and other essays – Ian Randle Publishers, 1999. ISBN 978-9768123633 (pb)
- Making West Indian Literature – Ian Randle Publishers, 2005. ISBN 976-637-174-1 (pb)
- Miss Lou: Louise Bennett and Jamaican Culture – Signal Books, 2014. ISBN 978-1908493972 (pb)

=== As editor ===
- Seven Jamaican Poets - 1971
- The Faber Book of Contemporary Caribbean Short Stories – Faber & Faber, 1990. ISBN 978-0571152995 (pb)
- (with Jimmy Carnegie) Lunch Time Medley: Writings on West Indies Cricket – Ian Randle Publishers, 2008. ISBN 978-9766372828 (pb)
- (with Carolyn Allen) Writing Life: Reflections by West Indian Writers – Ian Randle Publishers, 2008. ISBN 978-9766373290 (pb)
