= Black Metamorphosis =

Unpublished manuscript by Sylvia Wynter

Black Metamorphosis: New Natives in a New World is an unpublished manuscript written by Sylvia Wynter. The work is a seminal piece in Black Studies and uses diverse fields to explain Black experiences and presence in the Americas.

The manuscript is nine-hundred and thirty-five pages with chapters of varying lengths. Throughout the seventies and early eighties, Wynter worked with the Center for Afro-American Studies (CAAS) at the University of California, Los Angeles (UCLA) to complete the project which was to be published by the Institute of the Black World (IBW). The manuscript presents early iterations of Wynter's Theory of the Human and explores how Black experiences are essential to understanding the history of the New World

== Background ==
In 1971, Wynter attended the Association for Commonwealth Literature and Language Studies (ACLALS) conference held in the Caribbean. There, she met African American historian Vincent Harding and wrote him a letter detailing her goal to publish an essay on Black experiences in the Americas with the Atlanta-based think tank Institute of the Black World (IBW). The following year, Wynter submitted a draft of the essay which was then titled New Natives in a New World: The African Transformation in the Americas to be reviewed by the IBW. Wynter wrote that her intention was to

explore the Minstrel show as the first Native North American theater—and why Amerika distorted it; why a process of genuine creativity became a process of imitation and degenerated into a power stereotype, a cultural weapon against its creators. I shall relate the Minstrel show to the nineteenth century folk theatre patterns of the Caribbean and Latin America trying to link it to certain archetypal patterns of theater that we find for example among the Yoruba, the Aztecs and the folk English; and the way in which the blacks created a matrix to fuse disparate and yet archetypically related patterns.

Correspondence between Wynter and IBW over the course of the years does not reveal when the essay was to be expanded to a monograph. In 1976, there was significant mail correspondence between Wynter and the IBW in which she believed she could complete the manuscript during that year.

Between 1977 and 1982, Wynter began working closely with the Center for Afro-American Studies (CAAS) at UCLA to complete and publish the manuscript. CAAS at the time focused on supporting both financially and editorially faculty and graduate students in their scholarly work within Black Studies. CAAS had a publishing contract with IBW and worked closely with Wynter to revise the manuscript. Pierre-Michel Fontaine, a lecturer in the Afro-American studies department at Harvard at the time, sent a letter regarding the state of the manuscript to Robert A. Hill in 1978 when supervision over the manuscript was transferred to Hill. At that time, the manuscript was 250 pages long with missing footnotes and an unclear ending. By the end of 1978, the publishing committee at CAAS relayed to Wynter that significant revisions were needed including correcting citations and clarifying footnotes.

From 1980 to 1981, significant correspondence between Wynter and CAAS indicates the manuscript grew in length and underwent a title change. At that time, Wynter used the working title After the Passage: Culture and the Politics of Black Identity in the Americas. With her role as chair of the department of African and Afro-American studies at the time, Wynter relayed in letters both her busy schedule and continued intention to publish the manuscript. By March 1982, Wynter was no longer engaged in administrative duties and the hope was that she would return to working on the manuscript. A memo from that date is the last document from CAAS covering work on the manuscript.

== Overview ==
Black Metamorphosis explores the historical significance of Black cultural resistance in the world through an interdisciplinary approach. From highlighting Jonkonnu in Jamaica and exploring her intellectual shift from Marxism, the work covers a variety of topics. Wynter asserts that Black cultural resistance pushed back against the notion of Black cultural inferiority. Wynter further argues that European intellectuals "proved" both Black and Indigenous cultural inferiority in order to justify economic exploitation and displacement.

The entire text and related correspondence is housed in the Institute of the Black World papers at the Schomburg Center for Research in Black Culture, New York.

== Sources ==
- Aaron Kamugisha, "That Area of Experience That We Term the New World": Introducing Sylvia Wynter's "Black Metamorphosis". Small Axe 49 (2016): 37-46
- Aaron Kamugisha, "The Black Experience of New World Coloniality". Small Axe 49 (2016): 129-145
- Derrick White. “Black Metamorphosis: A Prelude to Sylvia Wynter’s Theory of the Human.” The C.L.R. James Journal 16.1 (2010): 127–48.
- Finding Aid for the Center for African American Studies. Administrative files. 1941; 1969–1990; Box 4, Folder: Sylvia Wynter 1977-1982
