= Slavery in colonial Spanish America =

Slavery in the Spanish American viceroyalties included the enslavement, forced labor and peonage of indigenous peoples, Africans, and Asians from the late 15th to late 19th century, and its aftereffects in the 20th and 21st centuries. The economic and social institution of slavery existed throughout the Spanish Empire, including Spain itself. Initially, indigenous people were subjected to the encomienda system until the 1543 New Laws that prohibited it. This was replaced with the repartimiento system. Africans were also transported to the Americas for their labor under the race-based system of chattel slavery. Later, Southeast Asian people were brought to the Americas under forms of indenture and peonage to provide cheap labor to replace enslaved Africans.

Indigenous societies in the Americas practiced slavery and other forms of coerced labor long before Europeans arrived. War captives, debtors, and raid victims were held in bondage in many regions. During the Spanish conquest, soldiers and Native allies seized prisoners as spoils. The crown later institutionalized Indigenous labor and tribute through the encomienda.. Following the collapse of indigenous populations in the Americas, the Spanish restricted the forced labor of Native Americans with the Laws of Burgos of 1512 and the New Laws of 1542. Instead, the Spanish increasingly utilized enslaved people from West and Central Africa for labor on commercial plantations, as well as urban slavery in households, religious institutions, textile workshops (obrajes), and other venues. As the Crown barred Spaniards from directly participating in the Atlantic slave trade, the right to export slaves (the Asiento de Negros) was a major foreign policy objective of other European powers, sparking numerous European wars such as the War of Spanish Succession and the War of Jenkins' Ear. Spanish colonies ultimately received around 22% of all the Africans delivered to American shores. Towards the end of the Atlantic slave trade, Asian migrant workers (chinos and coolies) in colonial Mexico and Cuba were subjected to peonage and harsh labor under exploitative contracts of indenture.

In the mid-nineteenth century, when most nations in the Americas abolished chattel slavery, Cuba and Puerto Rico – the last two remaining Spanish American colonies – were among the last in the region, followed only by Brazil. (Note: Puerto Rico abolished slavery definitely in 1873; in Cuba and Brazil, chattel slavery, in one way or another, remained legal until the 1880s. A series of legal procedures (e.g., Moret Law) and apprenticeships imposed on those supposedly freed, delayed the complete abolition of slavery.) Enslaved people challenged their captivity in ways that ranged from introducing non-European elements into Christianity (syncretism) to mounting alternative societies outside the plantation system (Maroons). The first open Black rebellion occurred in Spanish labour camps (plantations) in 1521. Resistance, particularly to the forced labor of indigenous people, also came from Spanish religious and legal ranks. Resistance to indigenous captivity in the Spanish colonies produced the first modern debates over the legitimacy of slavery. (Note: In 2007, Castro challenged the position of Bartolomé de las Casas as a central human-rights figure: "rather than viewing him as the ultimate champion of indigenous causes, we must see the Dominican friar as the incarnation of a more benevolent, paternalistic form of ecclesiastical, political, cultural and economic imperialism rather than as a unique paradigmatic figure". See: Castro, The Other Face, Duke, 2007, p 8.) The struggle against slavery in the Spanish American colonies left a notable tradition of opposition that set the stage for conversations about human rights. The first speech in the Americas for the universality of human rights and against the abuses of slavery was given on Hispaniola by Antonio de Montesinos, a mere nineteen years after the Columbus' first voyage.

== Background ==
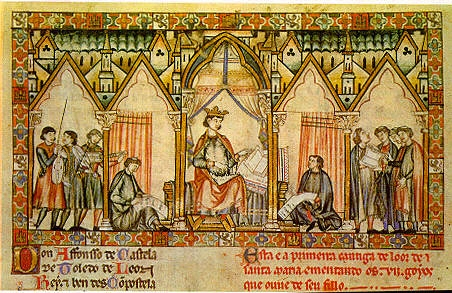
Alfonso X of Castile and the Siete Partidas

Slavery in Spain traces back to the times of the Greeks, Phoenicians and Romans. Slavery was cross-cultural and multi-ethnic, and had an important role in the development of European economies such as Spain. The Romans extensively utilized slaves according to the Code of Justinian. Following the rise of Christianity, Christians were in theory barred from enslaving their fellow Christians, but the practice persisted. With the rise of Islam, and the conquest of most of the Iberian peninsula in the eighth century, slavery declined in the remaining Christian kingdoms of Iberia.

At the formation of Al-Andalus, Muslims were prohibited from enslaving other Muslims, but non-Muslim Spanish and Eastern European slaves were traded by Muslims and local Jewish merchants. Mozarabs and Jews were allowed to remain and retain their slaves if they paid a head tax for themselves and half-value for the slaves, but non-Muslims were prohibited from holding Muslim slaves. If one of their slaves converted to Islam, they were required to sell the slave to a Muslim. Mozarabs were later, by the 9th and 10th centuries, permitted to purchase new non-Muslim slaves via the peninsula's established slave trade.

During the reconquista, Christian Spain sought to retake territory lost to Muslims, leading to changing norms regarding slavery. Though enslavement of Christians was originally permitted, the Christian kingdoms gradually ceased this practice between the 8th and 11th centuries, limiting their pool of slaves to Al-Andalusian Muslims. The enslavement of conquered Muslims was supposedly justified on the basis of conversion and acculturation, but Muslim captives were often offered back to their families and communities for cash payments (rescate). The thirteenth-century code of law, the Siete Partidas of Alfonso X of Castile (1252–1284), specified slaves' good treatment by their masters, and who could be enslaved: those who were captured in just war; offspring of an enslaved mother; those who voluntarily sold themselves into slavery. This was generally domestic slavery and was a temporary condition for members of outgroups. The Siete Partidas described slavery as "the basest and most wretched condition into which anyone could fall because man, who is the freest noble of all God's creatures, becomes thereby in the power of another, who can do with him what he wishes as with any property, whether living or dead."

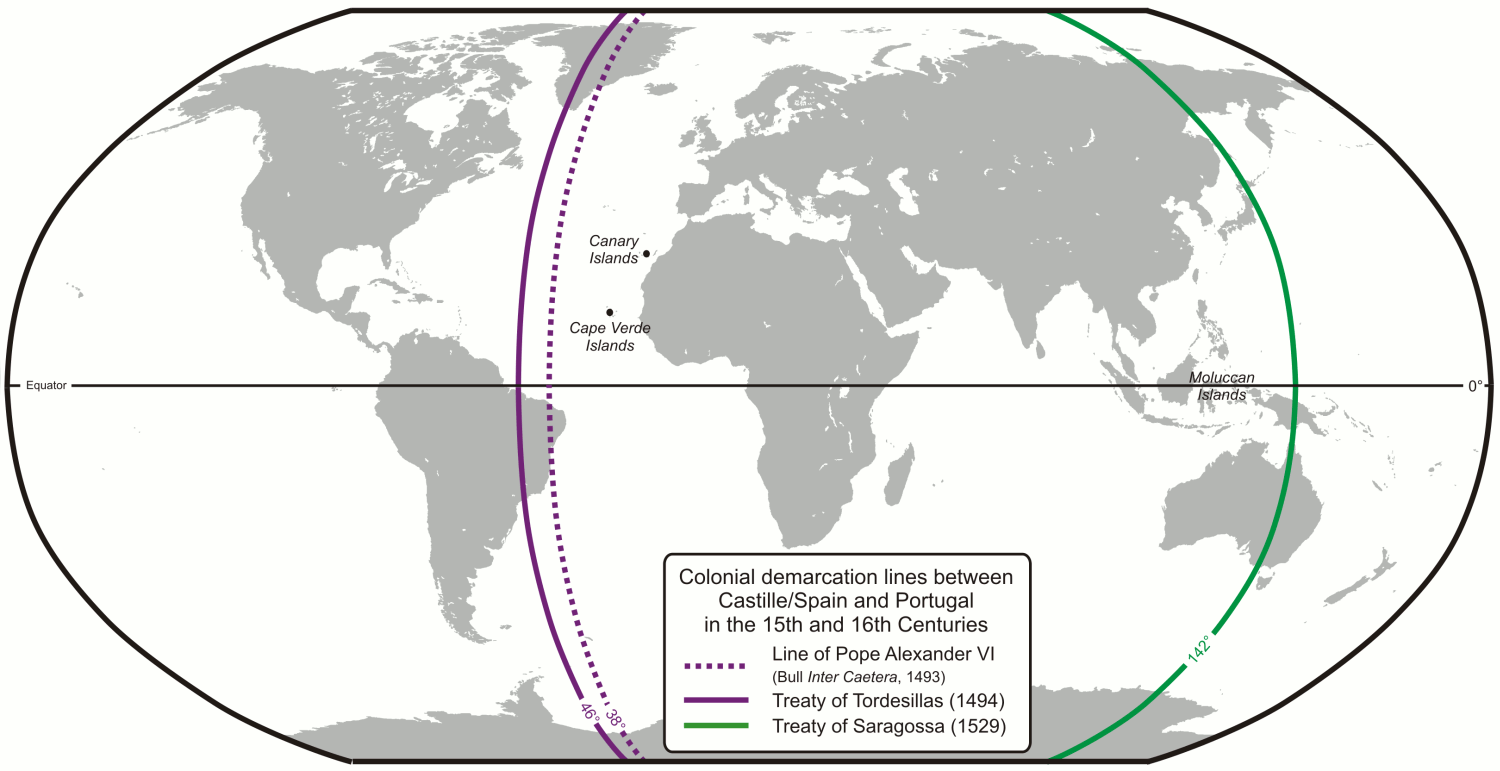
Lines dividing the non-Christian world between Castile and Portugal: the 1494 Tordesillas meridian (purple) and the 1529 Zaragoza antimeridian (green)

As the Spanish (Castilians) and Portuguese expanded overseas, they conquered and occupied Atlantic islands off the north coast of Africa—including the Canary Islands, São Tomé and Madeira—where they introduced sugar plantations. In the Canary Islands, the Spanish practised the encomienda system, a type of forced labor modelled on the reconquista practice of awarding Muslim laborers to Christian victors. The Spanish treated the Canarian natives, known as the Guanches, as pagans, but several attempts were made by the Catholic Church to prevent their enslavement and defend the freedom of evangelized Canarians. Despite this, the Guanches' population precipitously declined as a result of encomienda.

Under Castilian control, in the period from 1498 (when the Catholic Kings ordered the freedom of the Guanches) until 1520 (when the last Guanches were freed), Guanche encomienda was replaced by African chattel slavery. Castilians traded a variety of European goods—including firearms and horses—for slaves from West Africa, where the existing slave trade had begun to shift to the coast to meet European demand. In these colonies off the coast of Africa, the Spanish engaged in sugar cane production following the model of Mediterranean production. The sugar complex consisted of slave labor for cultivation and processing, with the sugar mill (ingenio) and equipment established with significant investor capital. When plantation slavery was established in Spanish America and Brazil, they replicated the elements of the complex in the New World on a much larger scale. In the Spanish colonies of the New World, the encomienda system would also be revived to enslave indigenous peoples. This system became much more widespread following the Spanish contact and conquests in Mexico and Peru, but the precedents had been set prior to 1492, in the Canary Islands.

== Indigenous slavery ==
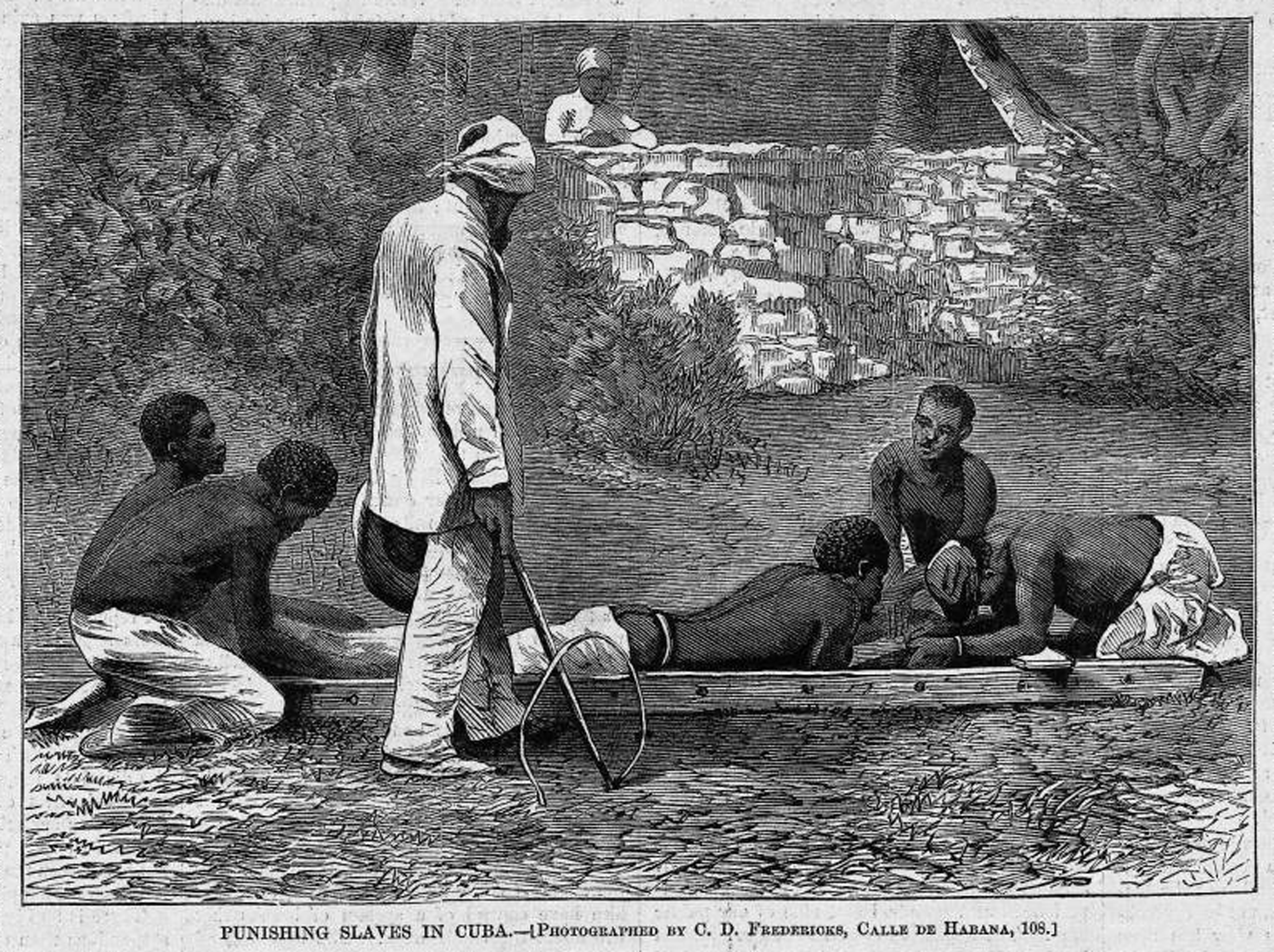
Cuban slaves punished by their owner in 1844

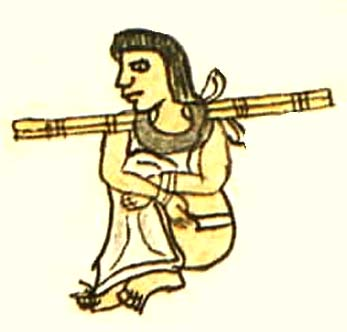
An Aztec slave

Following the arrival of Christopher Columbus in 1492, European enslavement of Indigenous Americans began with the Spanish colonization of the Caribbean. (Note: In Christopher Columbus's letter to Queen Isabella and King Ferdinand of Spain describing the native Taíno, he remarks that "They ought to make good and skilled servants" and "these people are very simple in war-like matters... I could conquer the whole of them with 50 men, and govern them as I pleased".) Initially, slavery represented a means by which the conquistadors mobilized native labor, with disastrous effects on the population. A group of about 24 Taíno people were abducted and forced to accompany Columbus on his 1494 return voyage to Spain. Unlike the Portuguese Crown's support for the slave trade in Africa, los Reyes Católicos (English: Catholic Monarchs) opposed the enslavement of the native peoples in the newly conquered lands on religious grounds, so when Columbus returned with indigenous slaves, they ordered the survivors to be returned to their homelands. By 1499, Spanish settlers on Hispaniola had discovered gold in the Cordillera Central. This created a demand for large amounts of cheap labor, and an estimated 400,000 Taíno people from across the island were soon enslaved to work in gold mines.

In 1500, the Catholic Monarchs issued a decree that specifically forbade the enslavement of indigenous people, but they allowed three exceptions which were freely abused by colonial Spanish authorities: slaves taken in "just wars"; those purchased from other indigenous people; or those from groups alleged to practice cannibalism (such as the Kalinago). In 1503, 80 caciques (Taíno tribal leaders) were burned alive and the remaining adults and children were killed at the Jaragua massacre, purportedly to prevent a rebellion. The escapees were later rounded up and enslaved. In 1508, Juan Ponce de León and the Spaniards arrived on the island of Boriquen (Puerto Rico), and enslaved Taíno tribes on the island, forcing them to work in the gold mines and in the construction of forts. In 1511, the Taíno in Puerto Rico allied with the Kalinago to resist the enslavement and abuse by Ponce de Léon, triggering the Spanish–Taíno War of San Juan–Borikén.

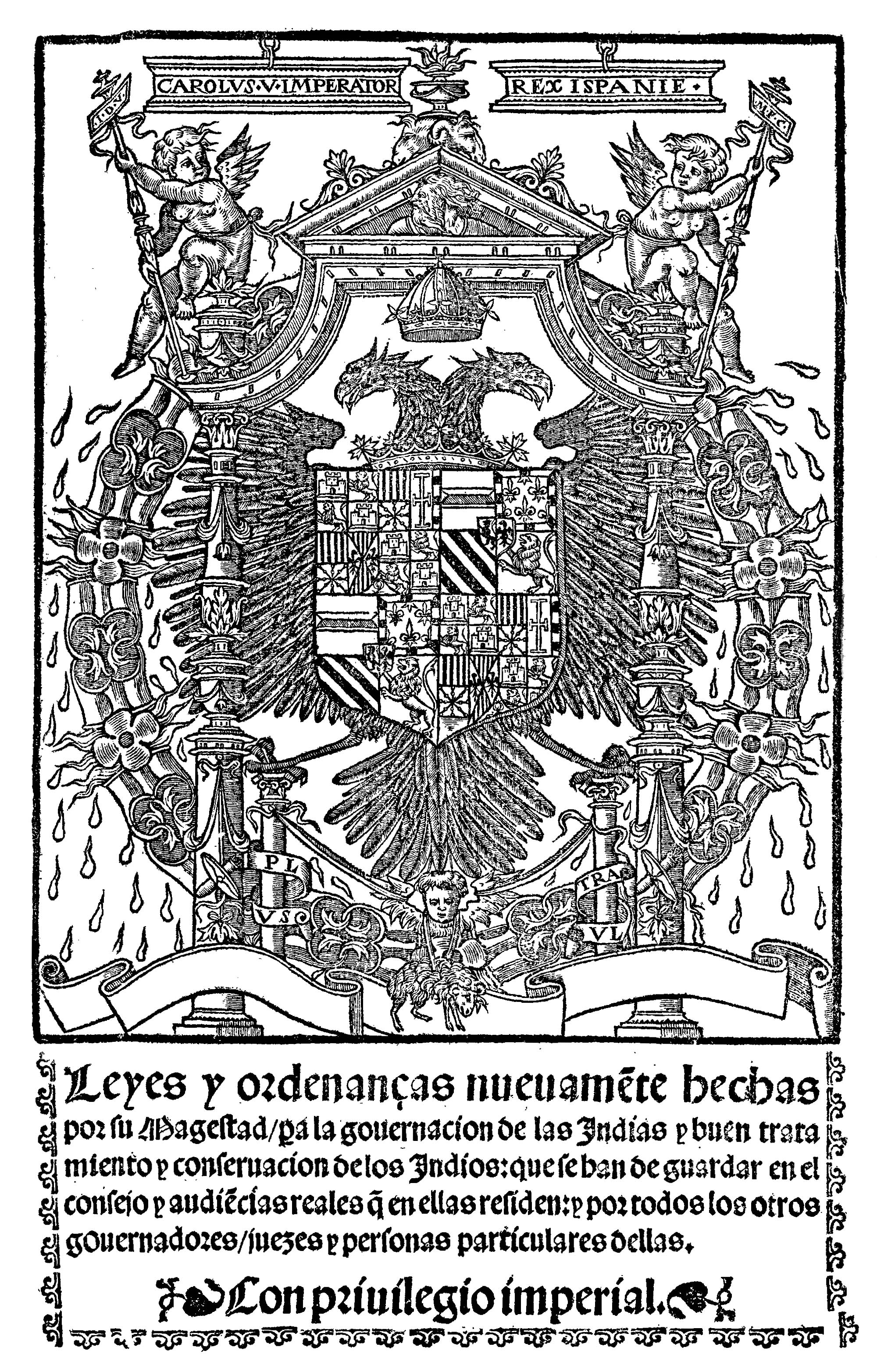
Cover of the New Laws of 1542

Members of the Spanish religious and legal professions were especially vocal in opposing the enslavement of native peoples. The first speech in the Americas for the universality of human rights and against the abuses of slavery was given on Hispaniola, a mere nineteen years after the first contact. Resistance to indigenous captivity in the Spanish colonies produced the first modern debates over the legitimacy of slavery. Friar Bartolomé de Las Casas, author of A Short Account of the Destruction of the Indies, publicized the conditions of indigenous Americans and lobbied Charles V to guarantee their rights. (Note: In 2007, Castro challenged the position of Bartolomé de las Casas as a central human-rights figure: "rather than viewing him as the ultimate champion of Indigenous causes, we must see the Dominican friar as the incarnation of a more benevolent, paternalistic form of ecclesiastical, political, cultural and economic imperialism rather than as a unique paradigmatic figure". See: Castro, The Other Face, Duke, 2007, p 8.) In New Spain, succeeding governors were appointed and recalled, often because of stories about their treatment of native populations. The Spanish colonists, fearing the loss of their labour force, complained to the courts that they needed manpower. As an alternative, Las Casas suggested the importation and use of African slaves. In 1517, the Spanish Crown permitted its subjects to import twelve slaves each, thereby marking the official beginning of the slave trade on the colonies.

=== Encomienda system ===
Despite religious objections, forced labor continued and was ultimately institutionalized as the encomienda system during the first decade of the 16th century. This system was established on the island of Hispaniola by Nicolás de Ovando, the third governor of the Spanish colony, in 1502. Under encomienda, the Crown granted conquistadors the right to extract labour and tribute from non-Christian indigenous people who were under Spanish rule. Some women and some indigenous elites—such as Maria Jaramillo, the daughter of Marina and conqueror Juan Jaramillo—were also owners of such contracts (or encomenderos). The Caribbean system was based on similar grants given during the Reconquista in Spain.

By 1508, the original Taíno population of 400,000 or more had been reduced to around 60,000. Spanish slave-raiding parties travelled across the Caribbean and "carried off entire populations" to work their colonies. Although disease is often cited as the cause of this population decline, the first recorded smallpox outbreak in the New World was not until 1518. Historian Andrés Reséndez at the University of California, Davis suggests that even though disease was a factor, the indigenous population of Hispaniola would have rebounded the same way Europeans did following the Black Death if it were not for the constant enslavement they were subject to. He says that "among these human factors, slavery was the major killer" of Hispaniola's population, and that "between 1492 and 1550, a nexus of slavery, overwork and famine killed more natives in the Caribbean than smallpox, influenza or malaria". By 1521, the islands of the northern Caribbean were largely depopulated. (Note: Official records indicate that the Taíno were decimated, although communities of people of Taíno descent still practice traditional life ways in some parts of the Caribbean today.) Dominican friar Bartolomé de las Casas (1484–1566) campaigned for protections of the indigenous population, especially crown limits on the exploitation of the encomienda, helping to bring about the 1542 New Laws which would replace encomienda with repartimiento.

In New Spain, the collapse of indigenous populations from conquest and disease led to a shift from the encomienda system to pueblos de indios. The encomienda system no longer made economic sense as there were not enough Amerindians remaining. This shift consolidated labor in a process known as reducciones, and replaced encomienda with "two parallel yet separate 'republics'": the república de españoles "included Spaniards, who lived in Spanish cities and obeyed Spanish law"; and the república de indios "included natives, who resided in native communities, where native law and native authorities (as long as they did not contradict Spanish norms) prevailed". The Amerindians who lived in the pueblos de indios had ownership over their land, but, because they were deemed subjects of the Spanish Crown, they also had to pay tribute.

In most of the Spanish domains acquired in the 16th century, the encomienda phenomenon lasted only a few decades. In Peru and New Spain, the encomienda institution lasted much longer. In Chiloé Archipelago in southern Chile, where the abuse of encomienda had led to the Huilliche uprising of 1712, the encomienda was only abolished in 1782. In the rest of Chile it was abolished in 1789, and in the whole Spanish empire in 1791.

=== Repartimiento system ===
After passage of the New Laws in 1542, also known as the New Laws of the Indies for the Good Treatment and Preservation of the Indians, the Spanish greatly restricted the power of the encomienda system, which had allowed abuse by holders of the labor grants (encomenderos), and officially abolished the enslavement of the native population except in certain circumstances. The encomienda system was replaced by the repartimiento system. With the repartimiento system, the Spanish Crown aimed to remove control of the indigenous population, now considered its subjects, from the hands of the encomenderos, who had become a politically influential and wealthy class. The replacement of encomienda with repartimiento caused considerable anger among the conquistadors, who had expected to hold their grants to hold indigenous slaves in perpetuity.

The repartimiento system was not considered slavery—since the worker was not owned outright, was free in various respects other than in the dispensation of their labor, and the work was intermittent—but it created slavery-like conditions in certain areas, most notoriously in silver mines of the 16th century Viceroyalty of Peru under the draft labor system known as mita, which was partially influenced by a similar draft labor system the Inca used also called mit'a. The repartimiento system allocated a number of Native workers to the Crown who were then assigned to work for Spanish settlers for a set period of time, usually several weeks, through a local Crown official. This was intended to reduce the abuses associated with encomienda.

In practice, the process was overseen by a conquistador, or later a Spanish settler or official, and applications for laborers were submitted to a district magistrate or special judge. Legally, these systems were not allowed to interfere with the Amerindians' own survival, with only 7-10% of the indigenous adult male population allowed to be assigned at any time. The Amerindians were paid wages, which they could then use to pay tribute to the Crown. Native men, working around three to four weeks a year, could also be allocated to public works such as harvests, mines, and infrastructure. Mining, specifically, was a concern for the Crown as well as the Peruvian viceroy. While there were attempts to guard against overwork, abuses of power and high quotas set by mine owners continued, leading to both depopulation and the system of indigenous men buying themselves out of the labor draft by paying their own curacas or employers.

=== Enslavement of rebels ===
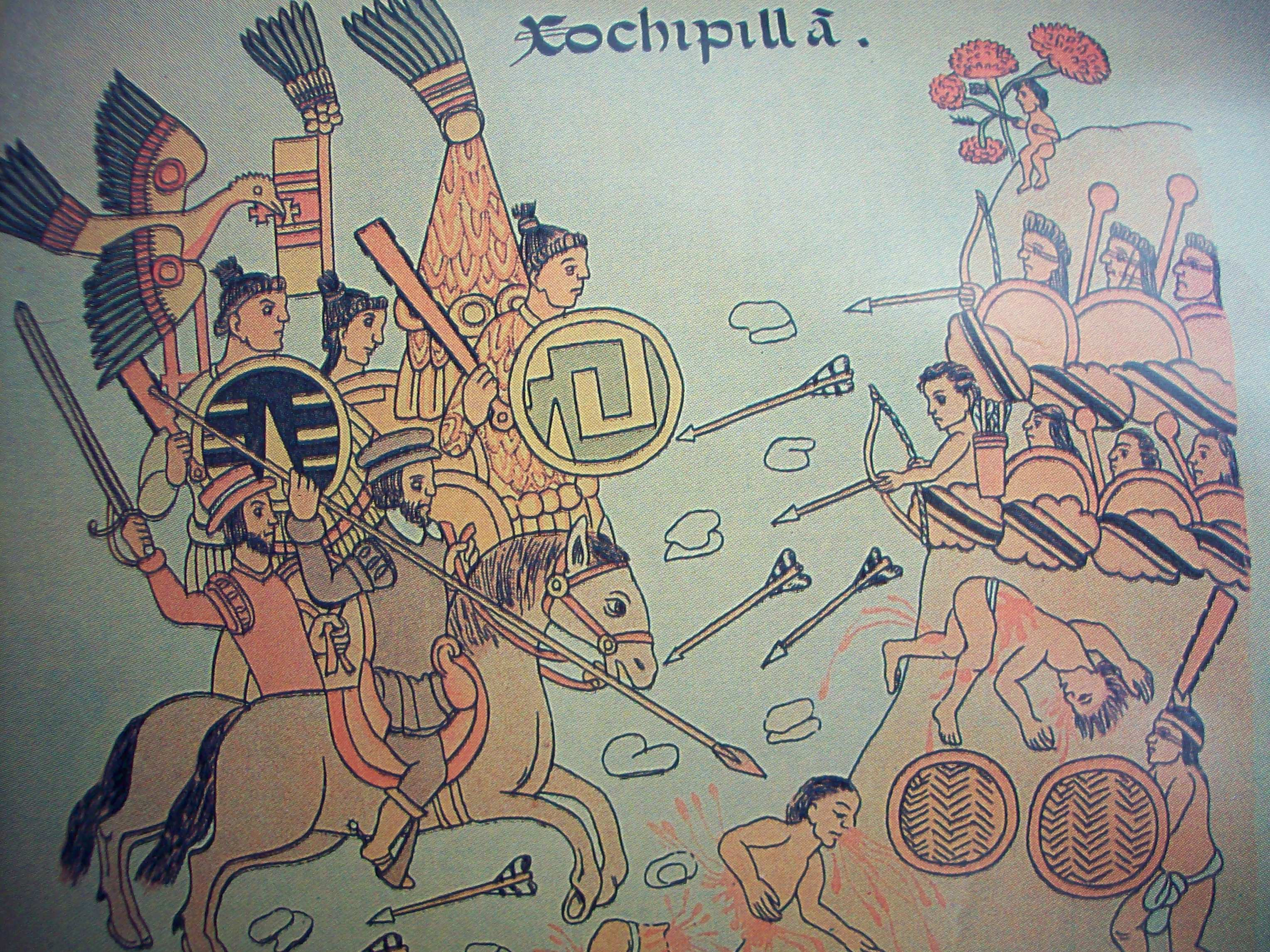
Viceroy Antonio de Mendoza and Tlaxcalan Indians battle with the Caxcanes in the Mixtón War

Despite the abolition of the encomienda system, indigenous people who rebelled against the Spanish could still be enslaved. Following the Mixtón War (1540–42) in northwest Mexico, many indigenous slaves were captured and relocated. The statutes of 1573, within the "Ordinances Concerning Discoveries", forbade unauthorized operations against independent Indian peoples. It required appointment of a protector de indios, an ecclesiastical representative who acted as the protector of the Indians and represented them in formal litigation.

=== Reinstatement of slavery for Mapuche rebels ===
King Philip III inherited a difficult situation in colonial Chile, where the Arauco War raged and the local Mapuche succeeded in razing seven Spanish cities (1598–1604). An estimate by Alonso González de Nájera put the toll at 3000 Spanish settlers killed and 500 Spanish women taken into captivity by Mapuche. In retaliation, the proscription against enslaving Indians captured in war was lifted by Philip in 1608. Spanish settlers in Chiloé Archipelago abused the decree to launch slave raids against groups such as the Chono people of northwestern Patagonia, who had never been under Spanish rule and never rebelled. The Real Audiencia of Santiago said in the 1650s that Mapuche slavery was one of the reasons for the constant state of war between the Spanish and the Mapuche. Enslavement of Mapuches "caught in war" was abolished in 1683 after decades of legal attempts by the Spanish Crown to suppress it.

=== Indigenous slaves in Spanish Florida ===
The new international market for products like tobacco, sugar, and raw materials incentivized the creation of extraction- and plantation-based economies in eastern North America. In Spanish Florida, slave labor was initially obtained largely by trading with neighboring tribes, such as the Yamasee. This trade in slaves was new: prior to the arrival of Europeans, tribes in eastern North America did not view slaves as commodities that could be bought and sold freely. Anthropologist David Graeber suggests that debt and the threat of violence made this sort of transformation of human beings into commodities possible. Tribes like the Yamasee raided for slaves in order to pay back the debt they owed to European traders for finished goods. This in turn created a demand for guns and ammunition, which further indebted the slave-raiding tribes and created a vicious cycle. The export of slaves to European colonies (and the high death rates there) created an unprecedented population drain. Slave-raiding also led to constant wars between tribes, and eventually destroyed or threatened to destroy most peoples in the vicinity of the colonies. (Note: "This trade infected the South: it set in motion a gruesome series of wars that engulfed the region. For close to five decades, virtually every group of people in the South lay threatened by destruction in these wars. Huge areas became depopulated, thousands of Indigenous people died, and thousands more Indigenous people were forcibly relocated to new areas in the South or exported from the region.")

== Black slavery ==
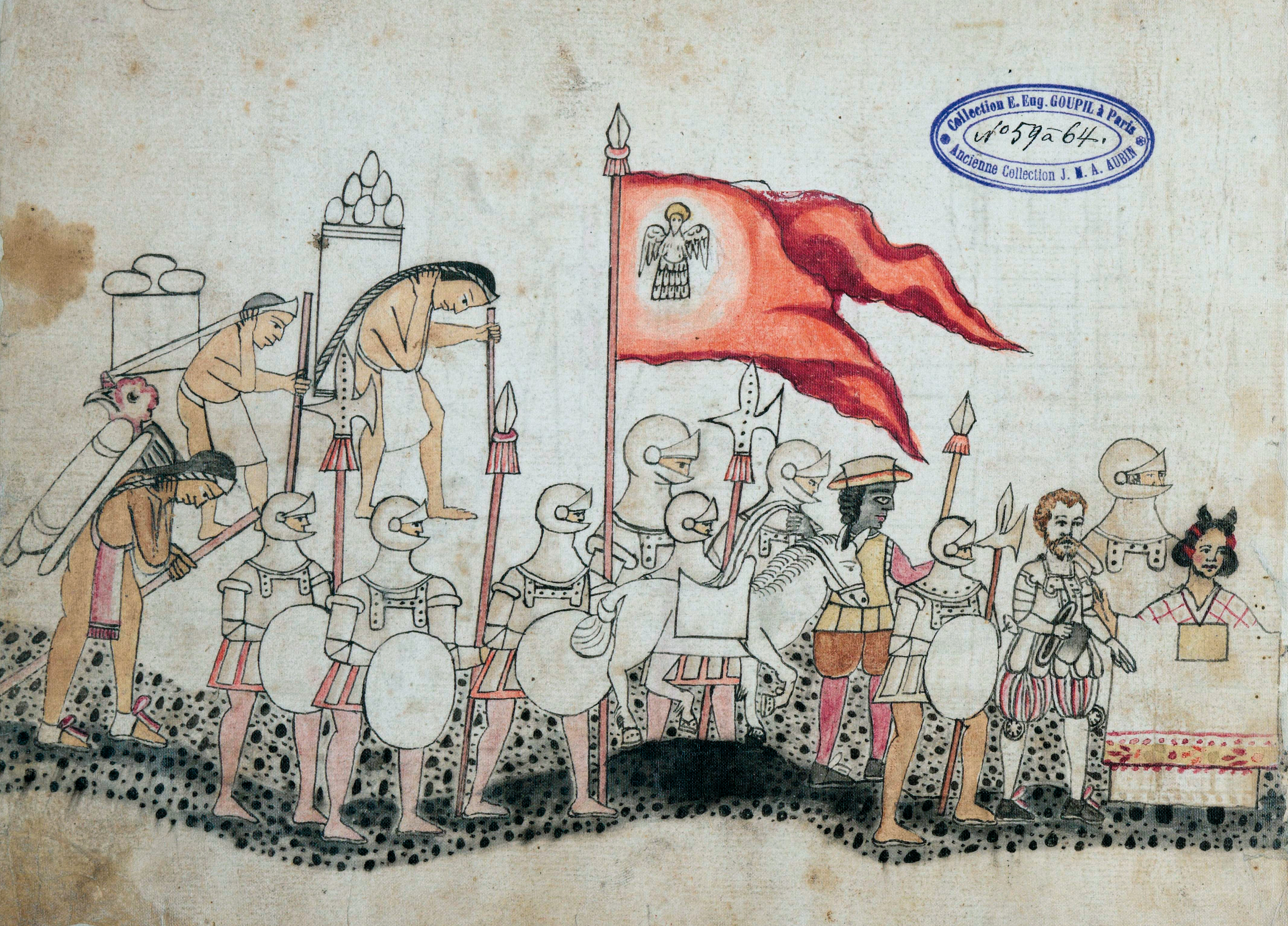
Spanish conquistadors in Mexico led by Hernán Cortés. The Spaniards are accompanied by native porters, La Malinche, and a black man (holding the horse). Codex Azcatitlan.

When Spain first enslaved Native Americans on Hispaniola, and then replaced them with captive Africans, it established slave labor as the basis for colonial sugar production. Europeans believed that Africans had developed immunities to European diseases, and would not be as susceptible to illness as the Native Americans because they had not been exposed to the pathogens yet.

With the increased dependency on enslaved Africans and with the Spanish crown opposed to the enslavement of indigenous people, except in the case of rebellion, slavery became associated with race and racial hierarchy, with Europeans hardening their concepts of racial ideologies. These were buttressed by prior ideologies of differentiation as that of the limpieza de sangre (en: purity of blood), which in Spain referred to individuals without the perceived taint of Jewish or Muslim ancestry. In Spanish America, purity of blood came to mean a person free of any African ancestry.

In the vocabulary of the time, each enslaved African who arrived at the Americas was called "Pieza de Indias" (en: a piece of the Indies). The crown issued licenses or "asientos" to merchants, regulating the trade in slaves. During the 16th century, the Spanish colonies were the most important customers of the Atlantic slave trade, purchasing thousands of slaves directly from the Portuguese, but other European nations soon dwarfed these numbers when their demand for enslaved workers began to drive the slave market to unprecedented levels.

=== Black slavery in the early colonial period ===
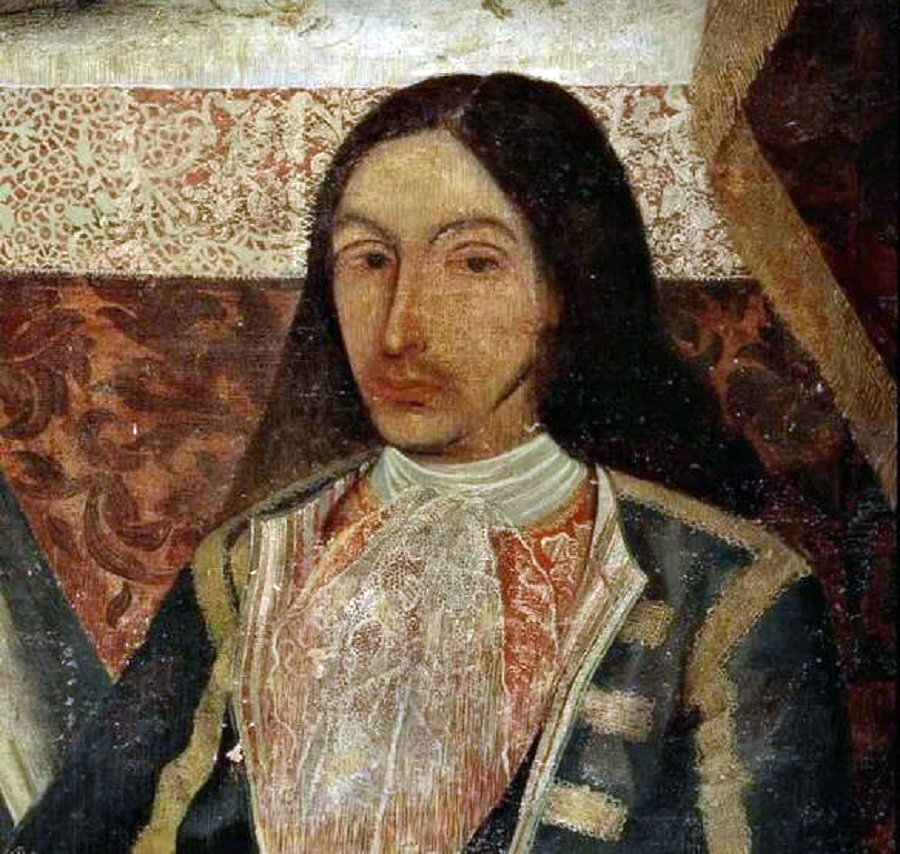
The Spanish Amaro Pargo, who was one of the most famous privateers of the Golden Age of Piracy, participated in the African slave trade in Hispanic America.

In 1501, Spanish colonists began importing enslaved Africans from the Iberian Peninsula to their Santo Domingo colony on the island of Hispaniola. These first Africans, who had been enslaved in Europe before crossing the Atlantic, may have spoken Spanish and perhaps were even Christians. About 17 of them started in the copper mines, and about a hundred were sent to extract gold. As Old World diseases decimated Caribbean indigenous populations in the first decades of the 1500s, enslaved Africans (bozales) gradually replaced their labor, but they also mingled and joined with indigenous groups in flights to freedom, creating mixed-race maroon communities in all the islands where Europeans had established chattel slavery.

In 1524, the Spanish began to import African slaves to what is now the country of Honduras—about half of them coming from other colonies such as from the Dominican Republic, Cuba, and Cartagena, Colombia, as well as directly from African regions such as Senegambia and Central Africa.

In Spanish Florida and farther north, the first African slaves arrived in 1526 with Lucas Vázquez de Ayllón's establishment of San Miguel de Gualdape on the current Georgia coast. They rebelled and lived with indigenous people, destroying the colony in less than two months. More slaves arrived in Florida in 1539 with Hernando de Soto, and in 1565 with the founding of St. Augustine, Florida. Slaves escaping to Florida from the colony of Georgia were offered their freedom by Carlos II's proclamation November 7, 1693, on condition of converting to Catholicism, and it became a place of refuge for slaves fleeing the Thirteen Colonies.

By the 1530s there were large numbers of black African slaves in the recently conquered Inca capital of Cusco as attested by Diego de Almagro departing this city with about 100 black Africans for Chile in 1535.

By 1570, the colonists in Puerto Rico found the gold mines were depleted, relegating the island to a garrison for passing ships. The cultivation of crops such as tobacco, cotton, cocoa, and ginger became increasingly important to the economy. With rising demand for sugar on the international market, major planters increased their labour-intensive cultivation and processing of sugar cane. Sugar plantations supplanted mining as Puerto Rico's main industry and kept demand high for African slavery.

=== Black slavery in the late colonial period ===
The population of slaves in Cuba received a large boost when the British captured Havana in 1762 during the Seven Years' War, and imported 10,000 slaves from their other colonies in the West Indies to work on newly established agricultural plantations. These slaves were left behind when the British returned Havana to the Spanish as part of the Treaty of Paris (1763), and form a significant part of the Afro-Cuban population today.

Cuba developed two distinct but interrelated sources of sugar production using enslaved labor, which converged at the end of the eighteenth century. The first of these sectors was urban and was directed in large measure by the needs of the Spanish colonial state, reaching its height in the 1760s. As a result, Thomas Kitchin reported in 1778 that "about 52,000 slaves" were being brought from Africa to the West Indies by Europeans, with approximately 4,000 being brought by the Spanish. The second sector, which flourished after 1790, was rural and was directed by private planters involved in the production of export agricultural commodities. After 1763, the scale and urgency of defense projects led the state to deploy many of its enslaved workers in ways that foreshadowed the intense work regimes on sugar plantations in the nineteenth century. Another important group of workers enslaved by the Spanish colonial state in the late eighteenth century were the king's laborers, who worked on the city's fortifications.

After 1784, Spain provided five ways by which slaves could obtain freedom. Five years later, the Spanish Crown issued the "Royal Decree of Graces of 1789", which set new rules related to the slave trade and added restrictions to the granting of freedman status. The decree granted its subjects the right to purchase slaves and to participate in the slave trade in the Caribbean. Later that year a new slave code, known as El Código Negro (The Black Code), was introduced. Under "El Código Negro", a slave could buy his freedom, in the event that his master was willing to sell, by paying the price sought in installments. Slaves were allowed to earn money during their spare time by working as shoemakers, cleaning clothes, or selling the produce they grew on their own plots of land. For the freedom of their newborn child, not yet baptized, they paid half the going price for a baptized child. Many of these freedmen started settlements in the areas which became known as Cangrejos (Santurce), Carolina, Canóvanas, Loíza, and Luquillo. Some became slave owners themselves. Despite these paths to freedom, from 1790 onwards, the number of slaves more than doubled in Puerto Rico as a result of the dramatic expansion of the sugar industry in the island.

The Spanish colonies in the Caribbean were among the last to abolish slavery. While the British abolished slavery by 1833, Spain abolished slavery in Puerto Rico in 1873.

=== Conditions for black slaves ===
Enslaved Africans were sent to work in the gold mines, or in the island's ginger and sugar fields. To maintain the slave workforce despite the high number of deaths, new slaves were imported regularly from Africa. Across the Americas, some 70% of slaves worked on sugar plantations and related industries. The slaves who worked on sugar plantations and in sugar mills were subject to some of the harshest conditions. The field work was rigorous manual labour which the slaves began at an early age. The work days lasted between 16 and 21 hours a day during harvest and processing, including cultivating and cutting the crops, hauling wagons, and processing sugarcane with dangerous machinery. On these plantations, slaves were locked into cramped barracoons, referred to by scholars as "sugar prisons", where they got as little as three to four hours of sleep per night. According to one former slave, the conditions in the barracoons were harsh, highly unsanitary, extremely hot, and unventilated. Others were given more space—allowed to live, for instance, with their families in huts, with a small patch of earth for farming, on their masters' lands—but were still subjected to harsh treatment. The slaves had little choice but to adapt. Many converted to Christianity and were given their masters' surnames.

Rebellion and escape were severely punished, but many Africans attempted to flee their enslavement anyway, sometimes killing themselves when no other options remained. Hanging was a common punishment for rebellion. For example, in Mexico City in 1537, a number of blacks were accused of rebellion and executed in the main plaza (zócalo) by hanging. African slaves were also legally branded with a hot iron on the forehead, which prevented their escape, "theft", or any lawsuits which might challenge their captivity. The colonists continued this branding practice for more than 250 years. Those slaves who escaped to freedom often formed autonomous communities with local indigenous groups, known as Maroons.

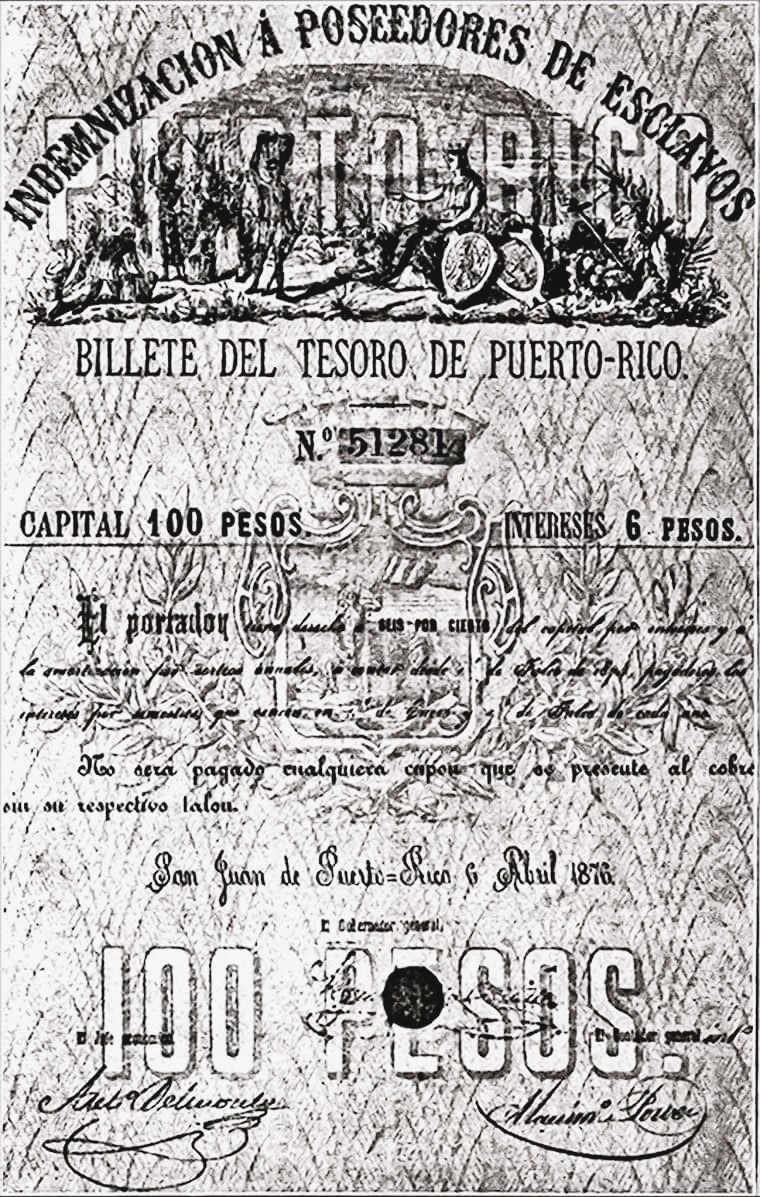
On March 22, 1873, Spain abolished slavery in Puerto Rico. The owners were compensated.

Both women and men were subject to the punishments of violence and humiliating abuse. According to Esteban Montejo—a survivor of slavery who was interviewed by Miguel Barnet for his 1966 testimonial narrative Biografía de un cimarrón (Biography of a Runaway Slave)—women were punished, such as by whippings, even when pregnant. Montejo said this sometimes caused miscarriages. Women and girls were also subject to sexual abuse, since most colonists arriving in the New World were men and there was a shortage of women.

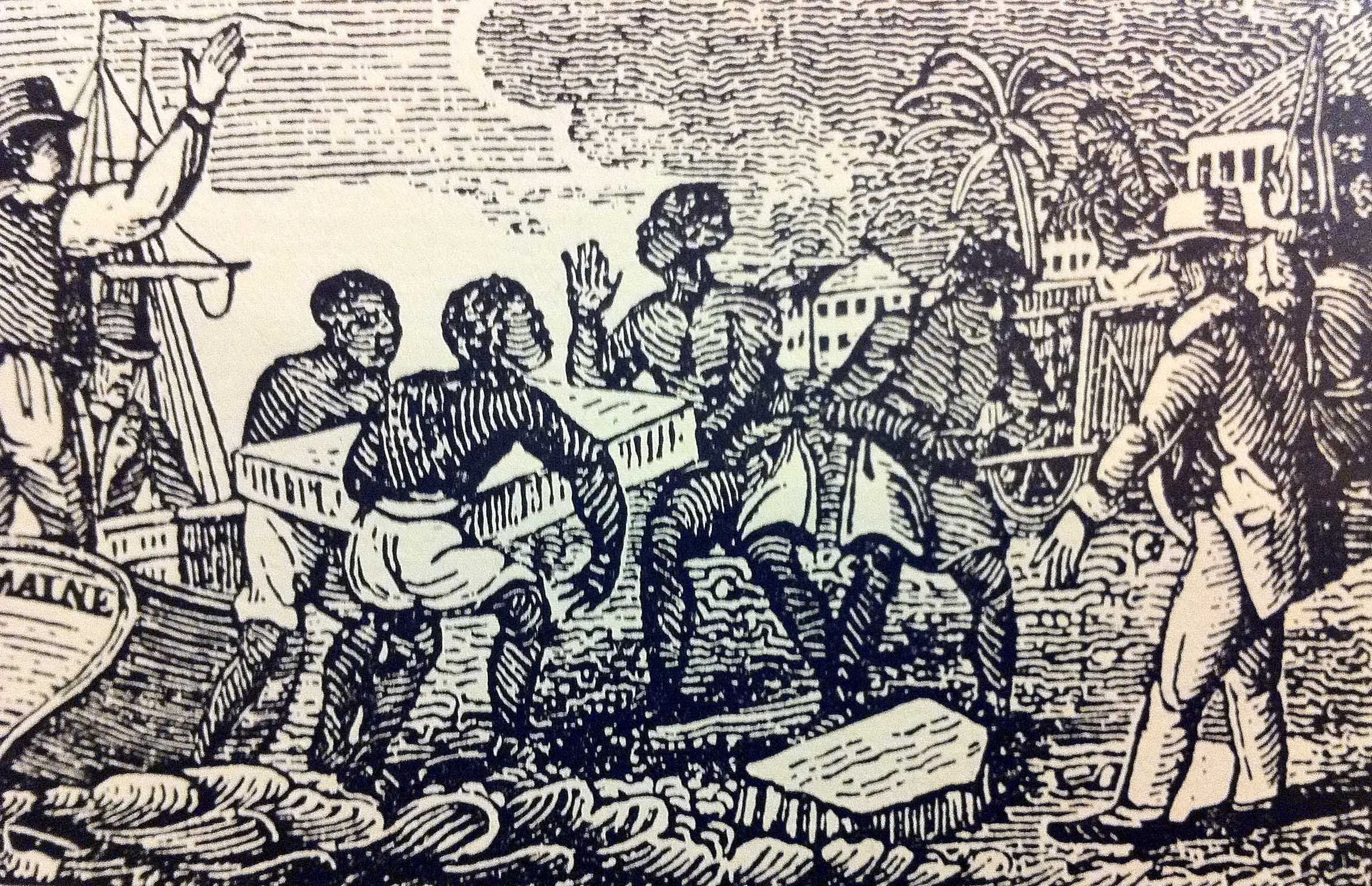
Slaves in Cuba unloading ice from Maine, 1832

Cuba's slavery system was gendered in a way that some duties were performed only by male slaves, some only by female slaves. Female slaves in Havana from the 16th century onwards performed duties such as operating the town taverns, eating houses, and lodges, as well as being laundresses and domestic labourers and servants. Female slaves were also forced to work as sex slaves. Some Cuban women could gain limited freedom by having children with white men. As in other Latin cultures, there were looser borders with the mulatto or mixed-race population. Sometimes men who took slaves as wives or concubines freed both them and their children. As in New Orleans and Saint-Domingue, mulattos began to be classified as a third group between the European colonists and African slaves. Freedmen, generally of mixed race, came to represent 20% of the total Cuban population and 41% of the non-white Cuban population.

The death toll for African slaves was often high, requiring the planters to replace slaves who died under the harsh regime. As well as importing new African slaves, planters encouraged Afro-Cuban slaves to have children in order to reproduce their work force. This became more common as the supply of slaves from Africa slowed due to the increasing popularity of abolitionism. According to Montejo, masters wanted to pair strong and large-built black men with healthy black women. He described slaves being placed in the barracoons and forced to have sex, to provide new "breed stock" from their children, who would sell for around 500 pesos. Montejo said that sometimes, if the overseers did not like the quality of children, they separated the parents and sent the mother back to working in the fields.

In 1789 the Spanish Crown led an effort to reform slavery and issued a decree, Código Negro Español (Spanish Black Code), that specified food and clothing provisions, put limits on the number of work hours, limited punishments, required religious instruction, and protected marriages, forbidding the sale of young children away from their mothers. But planters often flouted the laws and protested against them, considering them a threat to their authority and an intrusion into their personal lives. The slaveowners did not protest against all the measures of the codex, many of which they argued were already common practices. They objected to efforts to set limits on their ability to apply physical punishment. For instance, the Black Codex limited whippings to 25 and required the whippings "not to cause serious bruises or bleeding". The slave-owners thought that the slaves would interpret these limits as weaknesses, ultimately leading to resistance. Another contested issue was the work hours that were restricted "from sunrise to sunset"; plantation owners responded by explaining that cutting and processing of cane needed 20-hour days during the harvest season.

== Fugitive slaves in Spanish territories ==
Since 1623, the official Spanish policy had been that all slaves who touched Spanish soil and asked for refuge could become free Spanish citizens, and would be assisted in establishing their own workshops if they had a trade or given a grant of land to cultivate if they were farmers. In exchange they would be required to convert to Catholicism and serve for a number of years in the Spanish militia. Most were settled in a community called Gracia Real de Santa Teresa de Mose, the first settlement of free Africans in North America. The enslaved African Francisco Menéndez escaped from South Carolina and traveled to St. Augustine, Florida, where he became the leader of the settlers at Mose and commander of the black militia company there from 1726 until sometime after 1742. Since 1687, numerous African slaves who escaped from slavery in the Thirteen Colonies to Spanish Florida to take advantage of the policy.

On May 29, 1680, the Spanish crown decreed that slaves escaping to Spanish territories from Barlovento, Martinique, San Vicente and Granada in the Lesser Antilles would be free if they accepted Catholicism. On September 3, 1680, and June 1, 1685, the crown issued similar decrees for escaping French slaves. On November 7, 1693, King Carlos II issued a decree freeing all slaves escaping from the English colonies who accepted Catholicism. There were similar decrees October 29, 1733, March 11 and November 11, 1740, and September 24, 1750, in the Buen Retiro by Ferdinand VI, as well as the Royal Decree of October 21, 1753.

Many slaves also fled from Spanish colonies to nearby indigenous communities. In 1771, Governor of Florida John Moultrie wrote to the Board of Trade, "It has been a practice for a good while past, for negroes to run away from their Masters, and get into the Indian towns, from whence it proved very difficult to get them back." When colonial officials asked the Native Americans to return the fugitive slaves, they replied that they had "merely given hungry people food, and invited the slaveholders to catch the runaways themselves".

After the American Revolutionary War, slaves from the state of Georgia and the Low Country of South Carolina also escaped to Florida. The U.S. Army led increasingly frequent incursions into Spanish territory, including the 1817–1818 campaign by Andrew Jackson that became known as the First Seminole War. The United States afterwards effectively controlled East Florida (from the Atlantic to the Appalachicola River). According to Secretary of State John Quincy Adams, the US had to take action there because Florida had become "a derelict open to the occupancy of every enemy, civilized or savage, of the United States, and serving no other earthly purpose than as a post of annoyance to them.".

== Ending of slavery ==
Support for abolitionism rose in Great Britain and elsewhere in Europe. Slavery in France's Caribbean colonies was abolished by Revolutionary decree in 1794, (slavery in Metropolitan France was abolished in 1315 by Louis X) but was restored under Napoleon I in 1802. Slaves in Saint-Domingue revolted in response and became independent following a brutal conflict. The victorious former slaves founded the republic of Haiti in 1804. As emancipation became more of a concrete reality, the slaves' concept of freedom changed. No longer did they seek to overthrow the whites and re-establish carbon-copy African societies as they had done during the earlier rebellions; the vast majority of slaves were creole, native born where they lived, and envisaged their freedom within the established framework of the existing society.

The Spanish American wars of independence emancipated most of the overseas territories of Spain; in the Americas, various nations emerged from these wars. The wars were influenced by the ideas of the Age of Enlightenment and economic affairs, which also led to the reduction and ending of feudalism. For example, in Mexico on 6 December 1810, Miguel Hidalgo, leader of the independence movement, issued a decree abolishing slavery, threatening those who did not comply with death. In South America, Simon Bolivar abolished slavery in the lands that he liberated. There was also significant resistance to abolition—some countries, including Peru and Ecuador, reintroduced slavery for some time after achieving independence.

The Assembly of Year XIII (1813) of the United Provinces of the Río de la Plata declared the freedom of wombs. It did not end slavery completely, but emancipated the children of slaves. Many slaves gained emancipation by joining the armies, either against royalists during the War of Independence, or during the later Civil Wars. The Argentine Confederation ended slavery definitely with the sanction of the Argentine Constitution of 1853.

In the treaty of 1814, King Ferdinand VII of Spain promised to consider means for abolishing the Atlantic slave trade. In the treaty of September 23, 1817, with Great Britain, the Spanish Crown said that "having never lost sight of a matter so interesting to him and being desirous of hastening the moment of its attainment, he has determined to co-operate with His Britannic Majesty in adopting the cause of humanity". The king bound himself "that the slave trade will be abolished in all the dominions of Spain, May 30, 1820, and that after that date it shall not be lawful for any subject of the crown of Spain to buy slaves or carry on the slave trade upon any part of the coast of Africa". The date of final suppression was October 30. The subjects of the king of Spain were forbidden to carry slaves for anyone outside the Spanish dominions, or to use the flag to cover such dealings.

On March 22, 1873, slavery was legally abolished in Puerto Rico but slaves were not emancipated; they had to buy their own freedom, at whatever price was set by their last masters. They were also required to work for another three years for their former masters, for other colonists interested in their services, or for the state in order to pay some compensation. Between 1527 and 1873, slaves in Puerto Rico had carried out more than twenty revolts. Slavery in Cuba was abolished by Spanish royal decree on October 7, 1886.

== Asian indenture ==
As early as the 17th century, Chinese laborers were imported into European colonies to serve as cheap labor. Cuba became a major destination for such labor.

In 1817 and 1835, Spain signed treaties with the United Kingdom which, in theory, made the Atlantic slave trade illegal. Spain did not enforce the ban until the mid-1860s, but these treaties increased the cost of slavery in the colonies significantly. Following the Haitian Revolution, Cuban planters also feared uprisings from large numbers of blacks on the island, and began to look for more non-African sources of labor.

From 1847, Cuba began using indentured workers from China known as colonos asiáticos (also known as coolies, huagong or chinos) to supplement its local slave labor, and two Cuban ships transported workers from the British port of Xiamen to Havana to work in the sugar cane fields. The trade soon spread to other ports in Guangdong. Peru followed Cuba in 1849, with particularly high demand for labor in its silver mines and the guano collecting industry. In the 30 years until 1874, an estimated 125,000 to 150,000 coolies were transported to Cuba to work, often on the same ships used in the Atlantic slave trade.

Portuguese Macau was the center of coolie indenture: it was described as "the only real business" in Macao from 1848 to 1873, generating enormous profits for the Portuguese until it was banned due to pressure from the British government. The journey to the Americas, often known as the Pacific Passage, was risky, with high death rates. From 1847 to 1859, the average mortality rate for coolies aboard ships to Cuba was 15.2%. (Note: Losses among ships to Peru were as high as 40% in the 1850s, and 30.4% from 1860 to 1863.)

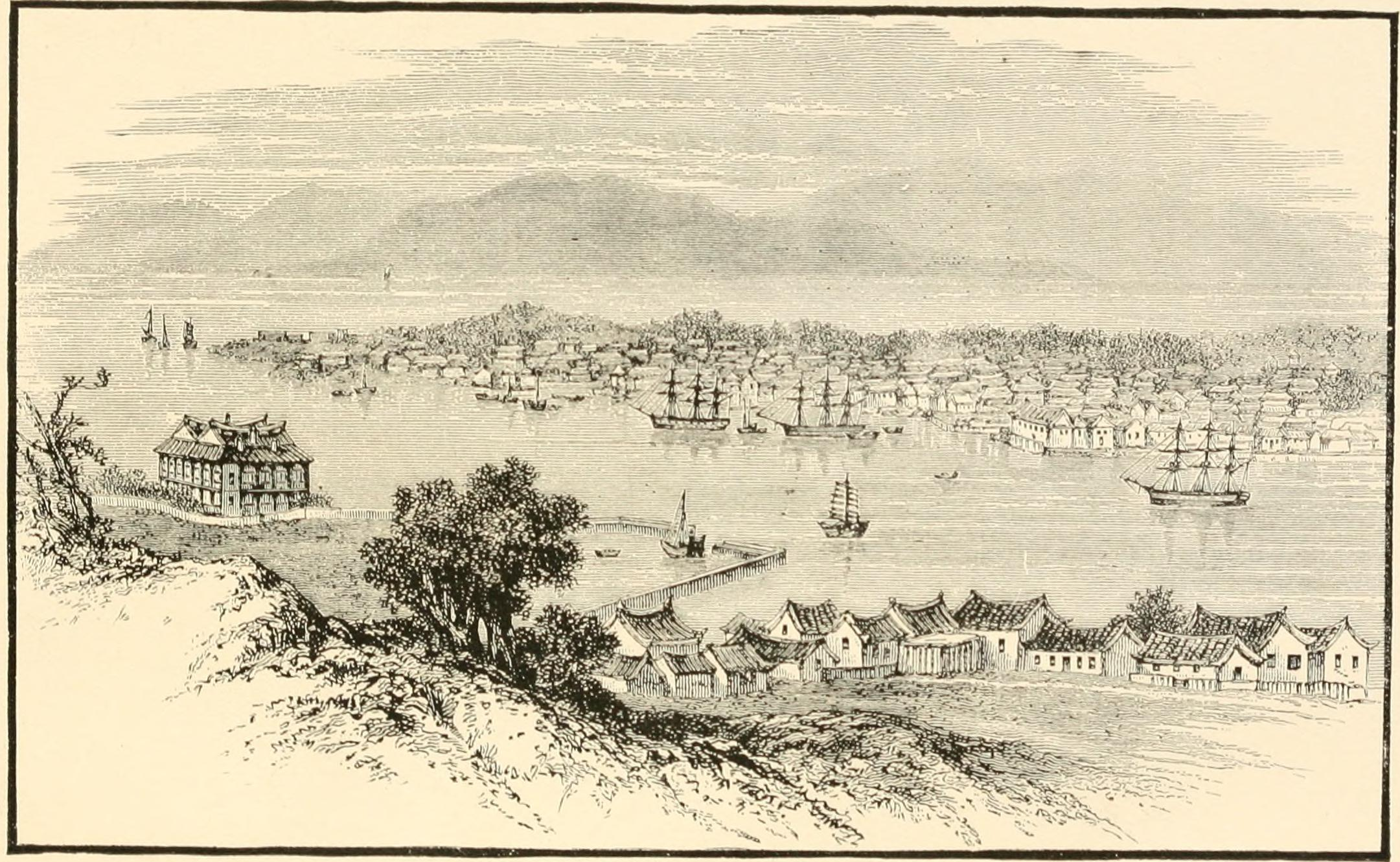
Illustration of the port of Amoy, where many Chinese labourers were shipped to foreign lands

The trade flourished from 1847 to 1854 without incident, until reports began to surface of the mistreatment of the workers in Cuba and Peru. As the British government had political and legal responsibility for many of the ports involved – including Amoy – such ports were immediately closed. Despite these closures, the trade simply shifted to the more accommodating port within the Portuguese enclave of Macau.

In Cuba, the centuries-old colonial government was powerful because the planters were willing to cede some of their power in exchange for maintaining their cheap sources of labor, with all the privilege and wealth such labor provided. This meant the Cuban colonial government allowed the exploitation of Chinese laborers to occur in order to retain its power. (Note: The new nation-state of Peru was more liberal but much weaker—especially in rural areas—and was thus unable to protect Chinese laborers in any case.) Legally, coolies were free, but they were often tricked or coerced into signing their contracts of indentureship. The stipulations of their contract meant they served a period of eight years' labor, often working alongside black slaves. As such, they often performed intense manual labor on plantations, on railroads, in mines and in guano pits, working six days a week. Some also gained jobs as urban and domestic servants. In return, their employers (patronos) were supposed to pay them four pesos per month, and give them food and healthcare. The pay rarely materialized, their conditions were inadequate, and they faced often brutal treatment, sometimes culminating in death. Many coolies were also prevented from leaving their contracts at the end of the eight-year term.

In both Spanish America, the Chinese were considered "white", in that they could not be enslaved and were entitled to certain rights and privileges not afforded to their African neighbors. The Spanish Monarchy had, in 1672, officially granted Asians the status of free vassals to the king, analogous to that of the indigenous people born in the Spanish Empire. Social attitudes to the Chinese were also more positive than to Africans in Spanish America, and now Peru, but the law tended to favor employers in disputes, meaning Chinese laborers' rights were often denied them. An 1860 decree in Cuba meant that coolies had to sign a new contract of indenture within two months of their prior contract expiring, or else leave the island or submit to forced public labor. Because few could afford home, this ensured they would be forced into further indenture. The coolies who worked on the sugar plantations in Cuba and in the guano beds of the Chincha Islands ('the islands of Hell') of Peru were treated especially brutally. 75% of the Chinese coolies in Cuba died before fulfilling their contracts. (Note: As for Peru, more than two-thirds of the Chinese coolies who arrived in the new nation between 1849 and 1874 died within the contract period. In 1860, it was calculated that of the 4,000 coolies brought to the Chinchas since the trade began, not one had survived. While Peru was marginally better at recognizing the rights of coolies, the lack of rural police forces and a willingness by many officials to side with employers meant exploitation was rife.) Two scholars of Chinese labour in Cuba, Juan Pastrana and Juan Pérez de la Riva, substantiated the horrific conditions of Chinese coolies in Cuba.

By 1870, labour contractors called enganchadores were used to manage and negotiate the contracts for coolies in organised labour squads called cuadrillas. The enganchador would act as a negotiator and manager for his cuadrillas, obtaining salary advances from planters, issuing tools, arranging food and accommodation, and assuming responsibility for the workers' behavior and performance. The enganchador had flexibility in the length of the coolies' recontract. The coolies were also able to negotiate their wages and sometimes even had the upper hand as the employer had to yield to market forces. New contracts often lasted only a year or two, with many signing for as three to six months. Salaries were also greater than the 4 pesos in the original contracts, and often significantly so. Once they had fulfilled their contracts, the Chinese workers usually integrated into the last Spanish colonies of Puerto Rico and Cuba, as well as Peru and the Dominican Republic.

By 1874—after reports of abuse had become widespread—rising international pressure from China, America and the UK meant that the Portuguese closed their trade in coolies from Macao, shutting off a key source of indentured workers for Cuba and Peru. Indentured Chinese servants also laboured in the sugarcane fields of Cuba well after the 1884 abolition of slavery in the country. Most Chinese laborers remained in the New World, often in the same neighbourhoods as slaves and former slaves. As a result, the coolies' interracial relationships and marriages with Africans, Europeans, and Indigenous peoples, formed some of the modern world's first Afro-Asian and Asian Latin American populations.

== See also ==
- Abolitionism
- Afro-Mexicans
- Atlantic slave trade
- European colonization of the Americas
- History of slavery in New Mexico
- India Juliana
- Slavery in the British and French Caribbean
- Slavery in Latin America
- Slavery in Spain
- Peon
- Race and ethnicity in Latin America

== Bibliography ==
=== Primary sources ===
- Columbus, Christopher; Toscanelli, Paolo (2010) [1893]. Markham, Clements R. (ed.). The Journal of Christopher Columbus (During His First Voyage). Cambridge University Press. ISBN 978-1-108-01284-3.
- Columbus, Christopher (1991) [1938]. First Voyage to America: From the log of the "Santa Maria". Dover. ISBN 978-0-486-26844-6.
- Las Casas, Bartolomé de, The Devastation of the Indies, Johns Hopkins University Press, Baltimore & London, 1992.
- Las Casas, Bartolomé de, History of the Indies, translated by Andrée M. Collard, Harper & Row Publishers, New York, 1971,
- Las Casas, Bartolomé de, In Defense of the Indians, translated by Stafford Poole, C.M., Northern Illinois University, 1974.

=== Secondary readings ===
- Aguirre Beltán, Gonzalo. La población negra de México, 1519-1819: Un estudio etnohistórico. Mexico: Fondo de Cultura Económica, 1972, 1946.
- Aimes, Hubert H. A History of Slavery in Cuba 1511 to 1868, New York, NY : Octagon Books Inc, 1967.
- Bennett, Herman Lee. Africans in Colonial Mexico. Bloomington: Indiana University Press, 2005.
- Blackburn, Robin. The Making of New World Slavery: From the Baroque to the Modern,1492-1800. New York: Verso 1997.
- Blanchard, Peter, Under the flags of freedom : slave soldiers and the wars of independence in Spanish South America. Pittsburgh: University of Pittsburgh Press, c2008.
- Bowser, Frederick. The African Slave in Colonial Peru, 1524-1650. Stanford: Stanford University Press, 1974.
- Bush, Barbara. Slave Women in Caribbean Society, London: James Currey Ltd, 1990.
- Carroll, Patrick James. Blacks in Colonial Veracruz: Race, Ethnicity, and Regional Development. Austin: University of Texas Press, 1991.
- Curtin, Philip. The Atlantic Slave Trade: A Census. Madison: University of Wisconsin Press, 1969.
- Davidson, David M. "Negro Slave Control and Resistance in Colonial Mexico, 1519-1650." Hispanic American Historical Review 46 no. 3 (1966): 235–53.
- Diaz Soler, Luis Manuel "Historia De La Esclavitud Negra en Puerto Rico (1950)". LSU Historical Dissertations and Theses
- Ferrer, Ada. Insurgent Cuba: race, nation, and revolution, 1868-1898, Chapel Hill; London: University of North Carolina Press, 1999.
- Figueroa, Luis A. Sugar, Slavery, and Freedom in Nineteenth-Century Puerto Rico. University of North Carolina Press, 2006.
- Foner, Laura, and Eugene D. Genovese, eds. Slavery in the New World: A Reader in Comparative History. Englewood Cliffs NJ: Prentice Hall, 1969.
- Fuente, Alejandro de la. "Slave Law and Claims Making in Cuba: The Tannenbaum Debate Revisited." Law and History Review (2004): 339–69.
- Fuente, Alejandro de la. "From Slaves to Citizens? Tannenbaum and the Debates on Slavery, Emancipation, and Race Relations in Latin America," International Labor and Working-Class History 77 no. 1 (2010), 154–73.
- Fuente, Alejandro de la. "Slaves and the Creation of Legal Rights in Cuba: Coartación and Papel", Hispanic American Historical Review 87, no. 4 (2007): 659–92.
- García Añoveros, Jesús María. El pensamiento y los argumentos sobre la esclavitud en Europa en el siglo XVI y su aplicación a los indios americanos y a lost negros africanos. Corpus Hispanorum de Pace. Madrid: Consejo Superior de Investigaciones Científicas, 2000.
- Geggus, David Patrick. "Slave Resistance in the Spanish Caribbean in the Mid-1790s," in A Turbulent Time: The French Revolution and the Greater Caribbean, David Barry Gaspar and David Patrick Geggus. Bloomington: Indiana University Press 1997, pp. 130–55.
- Gibbings, Julie. "In the Shadow of Slavery: Historical Time, Labor, and Citizenship in Nineteenth-Century Alta Verapaz, Guatemala", Hispanic American Historical Review 96.1, (February 2016): 73–107.
- Grandin, Greg. The Empire of Necessity: Slavery, Freedom, and Deception in the New World, Macmillan, 2014.
- Gunst, Laurie. "Bartolomé de las Casas and the Question of Negro Slavery in the Early Spanish Indies." PhD dissertation, Harvard University 1982.
- Helg, Aline, Liberty and Equality in Caribbean Colombia, 1770-1835. Chapel Hill: University of North Carolina Press, 2004.
- Heuman, Gad, and Trevor Graeme Burnard, eds. The Routledge History of Slavery. New York: Taylor and Francis, 2011.
- Hünefeldt, Christine. Paying the Price of Freedom: Family and Labor among Lima's Slaves, 1800-1854. Berkeley and Los Angeles: University of California Press 1994.
- Johnson, Lyman L. "Manumission in Colonial Buenos Aires, 1776-1810." Hispanic American Historical Review 59, no. 2 (1979): 258–79.
- Johnson, Lyman L. "A Lack of Legitimate Obedience and Respect: Slaves and Their Masters in the Courts of Late Colonial Buenos Aires," Hispanic American Historical Review 87, no. 4 (2007), 631–57.
- Klein, Herbert S. The Middle Passage: Comparative Studies in the Atlantic Slave Trade. Princeton: Princeton University Press, 1978.
- Klein, Herbert S., and Ben Vinson III. African Slavery in Latin America and the Caribbean. New York: Cambridge University Press, 2009.
- Landers, Jane. Black Society in Spanish Florida. Urbana: University of Illinois Press, 1999.
- Landers, Jane and Barry Robinson, eds. Slaves, Subjects, and Subversives: Blacks in Colonial Latin America. Albuquerque: University of New Mexico Press, 2006.
- Lockhart, James. Spanish Peru, 1532–1560: A Colonial Society. Madison: University of Wisconsin Press, 1968.
- Love, Edgar F. "Negro Resistance to Spanish Rule in Colonial Mexico," Journal of Negro History 52, no. 2 (April 1967), 89–103.
- Mondragón Barrios, Lourdes. Esclavos africanos en la Ciudad de México: el servicio doméstico durante el siglo XVI. Mexico: Ediciones Euroamericanas, 1999.
- O'Toole, Rachel Sarah. Bound Lives: Africans, Indians, and the Making of Race in Colonial Peru. Pittsburgh: University of Pittsburgh Press 2012.
- Montejo, Esteban (2016). Barnet, Miguel (ed.). Biography of a Runaway Slave: Fiftieth Anniversary Edition. Northwestern University Press. ISBN 978-0-8101-3342-6.
- Palacios Preciado, Jorge. La trata de negros por Cartagena de Indias, 1650-1750. Tunja: Universidad Pedagógica y Tecnológica de Colombia, 1973.
- Palmer, Colin. Slaves of the White God: Blacks in Mexico, 1570-1650. Cambridge: Harvard University Press, 1976.
- Palmer, Colin. Human Cargoes: The British Slave Trade to Spanish America, 1700-1739. Urbana: University of Illinois Press, 1981.
- Proctor, Frank T., III "Damned Notions of Liberty": Slavery, Culture and Power in Colonial Mexico. Albuquerque: University of New Mexico Press, 2010.
- Proctor III, Frank T. "Gender and Manumission of Slaves in New Spain," Hispanic American Historical Review 86, no. 2 (2006), 309–36.
- Resendez, Andres (2016). The Other Slavery: The Uncovered Story of Indian Enslavement in America. Houghton Mifflin Harcourt. p. 448. ISBN 978-0-544-60267-0.
- Restall, Matthew, and Jane Landers, "The African Experience in Early Spanish America," The Americas 57, no. 2 (2000), 167–70.
- Rout, Leslie B. The African Experience in Spanish America, 1502 to the Present Day. New York: Cambridge University Press, 1976.
- Seijas, Tatiana. Asian Slaves in Colonial Mexico: From Chinos to Indians. New York: Cambridge University Press, 2014.
- Sharp, William Frederick. Slavery on the Spanish Frontier: The Colombian Chocó, 1680-1810. Norman: University of Oklahoma Press, 1976.
- Sierra Silva, Pablo Miguel. Urban Slavery in Colonial Mexico: Puebla de los Angeles, 1531-1706. New York: Cambridge University Press 2018.
- Shepherd, Verene A., ed. Slavery Without Sugar. Gainesville, FL: University Press of Florida, 2002. Print.
- Solow, Barard I. ed., Slavery and the Rise of the Atlantic System. Cambridge: Cambridge University Press, 1991.
- Stone, Erin Woodruff (2021). Captives of Conquest: Slavery in the Early Modern Spanish Caribbean. University of Pennsylvania Press. ISBN 978-0-8122-9958-8.
- Tannenbaum, Frank. Slave and Citizen: The Negro in the Americas. New York Vintage Books, 1947.
- Toplin, Robert Brent. Slavery and Race Relations in Latin America. Westport CT: Greenwood Press, 1974.
- Vinson, Ben, III, and Matthew Restall, eds. Black Mexico: Race and Society from Colonial to Modern Times. Albuquerque: University of New Mexico Press, 2009.
- Walker, Tamara J. "He Outfitted His Family in Notable Decency: Slavery, Honour, and Dress in Eighteenth-Century Lima, Peru," Slavery & Abolition 30, no. 3 (2009), 383–402.
