= Business ventures and estate owned by Miguel Enríquez =

Businesses and land owned by 18th century privateer

Business ventures and estate owned by Miguel Enríquez cover the privateer Miguel Enríquez ability to use his business acumen to exploit the legal loopholes offered by his letter of marque to gather considerable weight and influence among Ecclesiastical, political and Royal circles, at the height of the Golden Age of Piracy. As his Corsair fleet thrived in the contested Caribbean, his military accomplishments earned him numerous privileges usually reserved for nobility, including the honorific of Don, the military title of Captain of Land and Seas and being one of the few New World citizens to be knighted, and the only mulatto in history to receive the honor. As the accolades grew, so did his range of operations. Enríquez contracted agents to keep him informed of anything of importance taking place in the Caribbean, the Spanish Main and the Iberian Peninsula. The employees of this transatlantic web were stationed at Madrid, Cádiz, Hispaniola (Santo Domingo), Cuba (Habana and Santiago), Panama, Colombia, Venezuela and Saint Thomas. Some of his employees such as Monsieur Siren and Diel de Gravila, were commissioned by the French Crown.

Enríquez opened several stores at Old San Juan, where he became the owner of most of Calle San Justo. These businesses had a wide range and targeted different clienteles, going from drift stores for the average citizen to clothing and fashion markets for the wealthy. His businesses were self sufficient, his haciendas were among the most productive in the island and he was the exclusive supplier of wheat and wine for the Catholic Church. Enríquez’s armory was said to boast more weapons than the Spanish military in the entire Caribbean. All of these ventures allowed him to soar to unprecedented Graig hits for a black man, becoming the wealthiest and most influential non white in the Americas. Nowadays, Enríquez is regarded as the first great entrepreneur, due to his business savvy and his participation in a wide range of commercial ventures.

== Commercial activities ==
=== Everyday goods ===
Material documenting Enríquez’s early incursion in the business world are scarce, as he operated in the background of the San Juan society as governor Gutiérrez’s figurehead. His move from a salesman to an influential merchant and privateer was unusually fast, despite the experience that he had acquired during his time working for the governor. Gutiérrez was instrumental in accelerating the success of the privateering venture, even allowing him access into a monopoly that he had created to run the local commerce through front men. Based on these actions, it is possible that the governor mentored Enríquez personally, providing him with resources.

By focusing on his role as a merchant and exploiting legal loopholes about privateering spoils, Enríquez gathered so much merchandise that it was unrivaled in Puerto Rico, selling anything that covered basic necessities of the citizens, ranging from food to brushes, razors, leather, locks and clothes. They also offered other commodities, such as playing cards, wines imported from Spain and equipment required for horse riding. Enríquez managed four warehouses, which besides storing merchandise were also used to manufacture anything that his ships needed. He divided them by class, separating the ones where food was stored from the ones where backup equipment was kept.

However, this model also had its drawbacks, since it was linked to the sort of relationship that he had with the authorities, with cities like Santo Domingo, Margarita and Santiago blocking him on occasion. Despite the volatile nature of his business model, Enríquez managed to secure a massive fortune. In 1716, he personally quantified the amount that Juan de Ribera owed him at 86,370 pieces of eight, which added to 20,000 that he donated, would place his fortune in at least 106,370. Fourteen witnesses claimed that based on the number of houses, haciendas, slaves, ships and amounts of other capital, his fortune should have surpassed at least 100,000. Enríquez himself stated that by then it was over 150,000 pieces of eight. Antonio Camino, who managed the money claimed that when all of the capital was added, the total ranged between 350,000 and 400,000. Valdivia supported this assertion, noting that Enríquez's house contained more items than any other house in Puerto Rico, without including its warehouses. Furthermore, his haciendas produced sugar cane, cattle and crops, which were lucrative ventures by themselves.

He took over as Puerto Rico's main supplier, both of food and military supplies, quickly becoming indispensable to the well-being and functionality of the government. However, his tactics did not settle well with the higher classes, who began indirectly accusing him of bribery. Despite this, the Crown was glad to accept any help, knowing that despite operating on for his own interests, Enríquez had become a vital figure in the Caribbean.

=== Services ===
Some of his buildings were assigned to offer everyday services including carpenters and blacksmiths. Another, became a private jail where troublesome citizens and slaves were held. Enríquez also built his own shipyard, which allowed him to properly maintain the fleet and build new ships. As his reputation grew, he was tasked with government services such as taking over the cost of repairing the defense fortifications and supplying the military hospitals. His ships were used to transport letters, cargo and the Real Situado between locations throughout the Caribbean and Spain by request from clients including the Spanish Crown, the regional viceroy and the Catholic Church, serving as one of the earliest private mail providers in the region. On occasion, this service included the transport of prisoners and individuals being accused by the state, with the sloop La Perla being known for this use. These voyages moved these convicts from the Caribbean to the Peninsula and vice versa.

== Atlantic slave trade ==
Enríquez pursued the rights to become the Royal Guinea Company sole representative in Puerto Rico. Established in 1701, this entity served as a major slave trader and became the only one sanctioned by the Spanish Crown to do business in their American colonies. On May 16, 1710, he officially completed this goal, signing a loan contract with the company's general director, Juan Bautista Chouirrio. With this accord, Enríquez became a major slaver in the territories of Puerto Rico, Trinidad, Margarita, Cumaná, Cumanagoto and Maracaibo, also permitting the acquisition of slaves from adjacent islands such as Jamaica, Saint Thomas and Curaçao depending on convenience. Under this agreement, he was able to import 40 African slaves per year, which he could sale under his own criteria. The contract lasted for three years and it also provided exemptions for clothes and maintenance. With the liberty to purchase these from any port in the Caribbean without right charges, it is likely that this was further exploited to import products at cheap prices, providing a large margin of profit.

For every peça sold, Enríquez paid 100 pieces of eight, which were combined with an additional fee of 4,000 per year. Danío was involved in the transaction (which would also prove convenient for him as an official of the company) and along the other parts, an accord to secure that wins and losses were divided into three equal parts between them. Enríquez was jubilant with this development and proposed public celebration to commemorate it. He held the contract for a period of four years, leading 19 voyages under the premise of acquiring slaves and maintenance for them. Most of them were destined to Saint Thomas. However, only ten of these incursions returned with new slaves for a total of 96, the others were used to import 109 barrels of flour. This cereal was supposedly bought to feed his slaves, but instead it was sold to the wealthier classes for profit. It is presumed that other odd products acquired under this premise, such as wine, beer, sugar, aguardiente, cocoa, paper and even copper, were sold in similar fashion. His enemies were quick to publicly denounce this practice, albeit with some exaggeration. Years later, these rights were supplanted despite the protests of Enríquez.

In 1713, the Royal Guinea Company lost its status and was instead replaced with the Real Asiento de Inglaterra. Enríquez immediately pursued a position within this new entity and quickly coordinated moves with some friends, Santiago Gibbens in Saint Thomas and Felipe Henríquez in Curaçao, to establish a new business model once he acquired these rights. To further secure the success of this venture, Enríquez offered gifts and even stakes to people that were already involved with the company. In June 1718, attorney in fact Tomás Othey granted him the title of factor and completed a loan contract. Enríquez was only able to employ this office until September, experiencing a series of complications based on international politics. During this timeframe, Othey himself imported slaves through the South Sea Company. The War of the Quadruple Alliance hurt Enríquez's interest, since he was forced to surrender all of the property that belonged to the Real Asiento. He declared that he no longer possessed anything that belonged to the company. With the embargo taking an extended time period, Enríquez likely hid the Real Asiento's property during the wait and keep them for himself.

Pozo was not pleased with this outcome and requested the intervention of dean Martín Calderón, expecting the church to intervene. Harassed by the ecclesiastical investigation, Enríquez requested a license permitting a move to Cuba, which was granted but never materialized. The arrival of a new bishop, Fernando de Valdivia, prevented the migration. Before leaving Spain, the friar had received requests to favor the privateer. Enríquez paid the voyage and offered Valdivia all sorts of gifts, including a house, jewels and slaves, spending at least 3,000 pieces of eight. For the next two weeks, the Bishop only had contact with the privateer, even ignoring the governor. Valvidia eventually established a lukewarm relation with the authorities, which was always superseded by his friendship with Enríquez. With his power, the Bishop revoked the actions of Matín Calderón and placed the blame of the conflicts on the dean and treasurer.

== Business tactics ==
=== Model ===
The Situado was Puerto Rico's main source of silver coins and by dominating it Enríquez guaranteed complete control over the local market. However, this move was complicated and the only way that he could accomplish it was by involving the governors and other royal representatives, forming a mutually beneficial endeavor. He sold his privateering goods priced with Billon real coins, which were then used to pay the military. (Note: Billon coins were supposed to be worth the same as the silver coins, but in practice were worth 25% less.) By the time that the silver coins of the Situado arrived to pay the military, they had already been paid and the silver was paid back to Enríquez. By doing this he not only gained local dominance, but was acquiring a type of coin that would be accepted in all foreign markets. However, this was not without problems, since the Situado was often late or incomplete, Enríquez would often face problems with liquidity. In at least one occasion, this resulted in the confiscation of an account worth 4,000 pieces of eight. Due to this, he experienced anxiety and would often issue letters requesting his associates to be patient and even requested credit until the silver arrived. Tired of operating at a loss, Enríquez created a plan by himself. When the governor of Curaçao proposed an exchange of European goods, he employed Felipe Henríquez as his representative and the three of them evaluated the creation of a unique structure to acquire the desired silver. The governor and Felipe would provide the capital, while he would employ his ships, the profits and losses would be shared equitably. Enríquez would send one of his ships under the excuse of privateering, but in reality the vessel was going to dock at Curaçao and would load with European merchandise. From there, the ship would travel to Veracruz, where the items would be sold as privateering goods in exchange for silver. To hide this from view, the vessel would return to San Juan loaded with some merchandise. The following voyage would be similar, albeit with a scale at La Guaira, where they would load with cocoa before traveling to Curaçao. After traveling to Veracruz, they would only sell the European items, with the cocoa being introduced to Puerto Rico as privateering goods. Enríquez expected to organize at least two yearly voyages under this format and even proposed the construction of a larger vessel, which would be boarded in the Curaçao scale. However, the plan was brought to a halt with the arrival of the newly designated governor, Juan de Ribera.

With Danío's opposition, his privateering venture was endangered. Once again Enríquez was forced to defend his role in the defense and supply of Puerto Rico from those that tried to minimize its importance. Despite this, he was able to keep a number of vessels constantly active, being the owner of at least 20. Enríquez did everything within his reach to keep a de facto monopoly over the local economy and despite the political tension, he was still turning a considerable profit.

=== Web of influence ===
Enríquez was very conscious of the racist discrimination that he faced among the white establishment, for this reason he became an expert in using his charisma to convert every meeting into an opportunity to sell his image favorably. He further enhanced this capacity via correspondence. The extent of his influence has led to him being considered the most important man in Puerto Rico during the 17th Century.

Two months before the Francisco Danío governor took office for his first term, a vessel commissioned during Gutiérrez's term docked at San Juan. The life-long Spanish merchant quickly tried to recruit a crew for it, but was largely ignored by the Puerto Rican sailors, who could earn a better profit by working independently as privateers. Furthermore, Enríquez likely felt that this would affect his business and conversely sabotaged the recruitment. This convinced Danío to order it to sail to Cartagena in search of a crew, which later mutinied during the return trip forcing a change in course that ultimately led to the vessel being lost. Under these fortuitous circunstancias. Enríquez's business was now secure and he quickly pursued the favor of the governor, forming a mutually beneficial alliance. Under these circumstances, Danío formed a pseudo-commercial alliance with the privateer. On occasion, they staged the capture of a vessel so that merchandise could be sold without taxes or restrictions. With mutual complicity, they then shared the profit in even halves. However, any losses would fall on Enríquez. The corsair went as far as paying some of the governor's debts and helping members of his family. These actions costed Enríquez money and men, but for some time served their goal of earning him the favor of Danío. The privateering business continued to grow under this model.

=== Foreign associates ===
In 1713, Felipe Senior Henríquez (also nown as Jacobo) and the governor of Curaçao approached Enríquez with a proposal to sale a shipment of European goods. The privateer offered to allow them use of his ships to move the merchandise twice a year, with a vessel being specifically built for this enterprise. The operation was to expand to the ports of Veracruz and La Guaira, eventually participating in the Venezuelan cacao trade. By 1714, Enríquez had established working relationships with several merchants from non-Spanish territories. Santiago Giblens and Felipe Henríquez remained his principal foreign associates. By legal definition, the Crown recognized all of them as contrabandists. To avoid this, Enríquez created a system that allowed him to import their merchandise while labeling it as privateering goods. He ordered his associates to send loaded ships towards the open sea and with prior knowledge, sent one of his own to stage a capture. Then the crew of his partner would safely return home in another vessel. Enríquez took this approach with extreme precaution, asking that the letters discussing these plan should only be carried by a trusted person that could handle them personally. To this ends, he employed his contacts within the Catholic Church and the captains of his ships, all of whom would protect him. Besides this, the other parts were cautioned to avoid discussing these transactions even with close friends. To ensure that they remained loyal, Enríquez often offered them gifts. These were usually jewels or similar items, but on one occasion he returned a ship named La Anaronel, that had been captured by La Perla, back to the governor of Saint Thomas to avoid conflicts with Giblens. Enríquez secured this alliance by also offering a loaded vessel as a gift to his associate. He rewarded his connections within the Church by importing items not found in Puerto Rico through these deals. Furthermore, Enríquez requested that a jewelry in Barbados made several diamond rings, for both sexes, which he also used as gifts.

== Estate and wealth ==
By gathering assets worth over 400,000 pieces of eight, Enríquez became the wealthiest non-white man in the New World. Despite this, there were periods of time where his business ventures suffered for a variety of reasons. Chief among these was a five-year power struggle with governor Juan de Ribera, which had a considerable impact on Enríquez's fortune as his ventures were brought to a halt, which was further exacerbated by the fact that he decided to sustain his employees despite the fact that his fleet was not sailing. After becoming distanced from Danío during his second term, Enríquez fell victim to two embargoes, where his properties remained confiscated until 1724. However, the authorities were only able to seize what was registered in his name, with neither jewels or coins being listed in the official forms. It is assumed that he hid a considerable portion of his fortune where they could not retrieve it. From these documents it was established that he was the wealthiest Puerto Rican of his time, capable of casually investing 500 pieces of eight.

The Matías de Abadía regime was the privateer’s final stand, as he was now considered persona non grata and a number of lawsuits were filed against him with the full support of the administration. During the final months of 1732, the governor sentenced Enríquez for not paying Camino and another group of merchants. The former was to receive 5,800 pieces of eight, the salary of ten years, despite the protest of the privateer who reclaimed what he had given to his former trustee. Enríquez tried to appeal, but before a sentence was reached Abadía forced him to pay. The privateer gave 20 slaves that were worth the fine. Furthermore, Enríquez was forced to pay 21,631 additional pieces of eight for an unrelated matter. The merchants were demanding 72,285 which Abadía also granted, despite the fact that Enríquez assured that the debt was paid. The governor's stance led to the arrival of several alleged creditors, which in turn reclaimed their own purported debts, some dating back nearly thirty years. Twenty-two cases were open for the total of 199,129 pieces of eight, 4 reales and 11 maravedís. The Crown itself reclaimed 25,069 pieces of eight and 2 reales for a trade, equipment and the capture of a slaving vessel by La Modista. The Church also demanded 27,291 pieces of eight based on three transactions. In the end, even the totality of Enríquez's fortune would not be enough to pay the entire sum. A complete embargo was ordered by Abadía in 1733. Mysteriously, the entire fortune was only estimated to be worth 43,000 pieces of eight, although the worth of his slaves alone was known to surpass this sum and he had invested 150,000 recently.

=== Buildings and infrastructure ===
In San Juan alone, Enríquez owned 13 well-equipped houses, several of which he employed for other purposes such as warehouses, carpenter and mechanic shops, an armory and a blacksmith. Another one served as a hotel for notable visitors, while a third one was used to temporally house the Catholic Bishops. Most of them were located at Santa Bárbara street, adjacent to the San Justo marina. His main house was one of the most complete 18th century houses on record and it was equipped with several luxurious decorations, including several pieces of art, but it was also partially converted into a warehouse and store. This marked a stark contrast in a time where the government heavily depended on the Situado and the governor's salary was only 2,200 pieces of eight, while other high-ranking figures did not even reach 800 and common professionals barely reached 3 per day.

=== Asset management ===
With growing contempt against him, Enríquez secured the well-being of his son by placing three houses in San Juan and a farm near Bayamón river (worth 20,000 pieces of eight) to the service of the church. This move guaranteed that they would be beyond the reach of his enemies, with the intention that Vicente would end serving as the chaplain of these properties, receiving a stable income and inheriting at least part of his fortune. To this end, he made a request to Valdivia so that Vicente could fulfill this role. Despite this office, he would also aid his father manage his business. Enríquez had also led an effort to rebuild the cathedral of San Juan. Since his known goods were declared insufficient to pay the debt with an embargo, Abadía complied with the demands of Camino and seized the chaplaincies that were created by Enríquez's donation to the Catholic Church, leaving his son without a place to practice. Vicente tried to appeal at the Royal Audiencia of Santo Domingo. However, his plights were ignored and the governor's ruling was upheld.

Despite being of mixed race, Enríquez owned several African slaves, which served as an assertion of his social status and performed his menial tasks. At least 50 were working in one of his haciendas, El Plantaje. Enríquez owned another hacienda, Ribiera del Bayamón, where he employed 49 black slaves. Of which he might have fathered a significant portion of 21, which shared his last name, with most also being named Miguel. The other option being that the parents of these children decided to adopt his name as a form of tribute for their master. He maintained this group with three plantations that amassed over 7,982 plants and 10,000 yards where yuca was cultivated. His haciendas were mostly dedicated to the support of his slaves, who in turn did most of the hard work that sustained his empire. Enríquez employed more in his workshops and the port, performing works that varied from carpenters and blacksmiths to moving cargo and supply ships that were about to set sail. Enríquez rarely bought these slaves and the few times that he did it was through the advantages provided by the Royal Asiento or the Guinea Company. Most of them were actually acquired through his privateering vessels.

Enríquez was the Puerto Rican that owned more slaves during his time and was reportedly harsh with them. His methods of discipline included holding them captive in his own private jail, food deprivation and flailing. Between 1718 and 1720, several storms affected Puerto Rico, destroying the agriculture and causing a shortage of food and shelter. To further complicate matters, an epidemic was declared, causing the death of several patients. The residents of San Juan asked Enríquez to help, and he responded by donating 400 jars of melado (a type of food made from sugar and molasses) and an entire shipment of corn, which one of his ships had delivered. He also took over the funeral services of the poor that died, paying the Church personally. By 1723, Enríquez had developed a reputation for altruism, reportedly helping neighbors and foreigners alike. On a yearly basis, he continued to work with charity, donating to treat the sick and providing clothes for the poor. However, this actions did not sit well with his enemies, who made efforts to minimize their impact. Despite these efforts, on a personal level Enríquez's grew to dislike the prospect of manual labor and adapted his clothing and diet to that of the higher class that attacked himself, expressing disdain when the only foods available were those commonly consumed by the poor.
