= Walter Franklin Anderson =

American music professor (1915–2003)

- Anderson in 1948
- Born: May 12, 1915; Zanesville, Ohio, U.S.
- Died: November 24, 2003 (aged 88); Washington, D.C., U.S.

Walter Franklin Anderson (May 12, 1915 – November 24, 2003) was a professor of music, classical/jazz pianist/organist, and composer.

In 1946 he was appointed as chairman of the music department at Antioch College and the first African-American professor at Antioch. He also led the music programs at the National Endowment for the Arts (NEA). He composed many musical pieces and was recognized with several honorary doctorates and awards.

Anderson was named "one of 50 people whose talents and efforts had touched the lives of many orchestras in a significant way" by the American Symphony Orchestra League.

He died of cancer November 24, 2003, in Washington, DC.

== Early life and education ==
He was born on May 12, 1915, in Zanesville, Ohio, one of nine children to a low income family, descendants of slaves. At age seven he took piano lessons. By age twelve he was recognized as a child prodigy.

He attended Oberlin College on a full scholarship, receiving his BA in music in 1936. In 1937 he studied music at the newly created Berkshire Music Center in Tanglewood, Ohio, where he studied composition with composer Paul Hindemith. He later studied at the Cleveland Institute of Music.

He was granted the equivalent of a doctoral degree in 1952 by the American Guild of Organists, and in the 1970s he was awarded other honorary doctorates.

== Career ==
Anderson taught piano, voice, and music theory at the Kentucky State College for Negroes (now Kentucky State University).

In 1946 Dr. Anderson became the head of Antioch's music department and was the first African American professor at Antioch College. Among the many students he influenced were Coretta Scott King, the widow of Martin Luther King Jr., and Leontyne Price, the opera singer. After she completed her degree in music at Antioch he encouraged Scott King to apply to the New England Conservatory of Music. In December 1947 Price performed as a soloist in George Frideric Handel's Messiah oratorio conducted by Anderson with the choirs of both Wilberforce and Antioch Colleges.

1948 Pepsi advertisement in the Cleveland Call and Post featuring Anderson

In 1948 he was granted a Rosenwald Fellowship in music composition, which he used to compose Variations on the Negro Spiritual, "Lord, Lord, Lord" which the Cleveland Orchestra performed. He also wrote the D-Day Prayer Cantata, suggested by First Lady Eleanor Roosevelt, in commemoration of World War II and it was performed on television in 1950 on the 6th anniversary of the invasion.

Anderson became the director of music programs at the newly created National Endowment for the Arts (NEA) in 1969. While there developed projects for supporting music performances and composition and created funding models. He retired in 1983.

Throughout this time Anderson also worked as a concert pianist.

== Well-known students ==
Among the many students Anderson influenced were Coretta Scott King, the widow of Martin Luther King Jr., and Leontyne Price, the opera singer. After she completed her degree in music at Antioch he encouraged Scott King to apply to the New England Conservatory of Music. In December 1947 Price performed as a soloist in George Frideric Handel's Messiah oratorio conducted by Anderson with the choirs of both Wilberforce and Antioch Colleges.

After Anderson died of cancer November 24, 2003, in Washington, DC, Coretta Scott King eulogized him in a 2004 Antioch talk when she was awarded the Horace Mann prize:

He was not only a superb musician and a brilliant educator, but also one of the kindest and most caring human beings I have had the privilege of knowing. A man of extraordinary compassion and generosity, he was one of those rare people who enriched the lives of everyone who had the privilege to know him.

== Compositions ==
Over the years, Anderson composed close to 100 works for orchestra, chorus and string quartet.

== Additional associations ==
- Founding member of the Association of Performing Arts Presenters in 1957.
- Board member of Theater Chamber Players of Washington and Young Concert Artists of New York and Washington.
- Presidential fellow at the Aspen Institute for Humanistic Studies in 1978.
- Served on Advisory Council to the Institute of the Black World at the Martin Luther King, Jr. Memorial Center.

== Awards ==
- Awarded four honorary doctorates in music including American Guild of Organists (1952) and Berea College (1970)
- 1979: Recipient of the Cleveland Arts Prize for Distinguished Service to the Arts
- 1993: Recognized as one of 50 people whose talents and efforts significantly touched the lives of numerous musicians and orchestras by the American Symphony Orchestra League
- 2004: Posthumously awarded the Gold Baton Award by the League of American Orchestras
- 2010: An award for advancing diversity was named in his honor by the Antioch Alumni Association

== Books about Anderson ==
Horn, Joan, Playing on All the Keys: The Life of Walter F. Anderson, Yellow Springs Historical Society, 2008 ISBN 978-0971693326
