= Norman Girvan =

Jamaican economist (1941–2014)

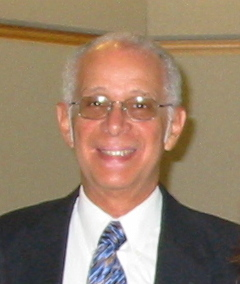
- Born: Norman Paul Girvan; 28 June 1941; Saint Andrew Parish, Colony of Jamaica, British Empire
- Died: 9 April 2014 (aged 72); Cuba
- Education: Calabar High School; University College of the West Indies; London School of Economics

Norman Paul Girvan (28 June 1941 – 9 April 2014) was a Jamaican professor, Secretary General of the Association of Caribbean States between 2000 and 2004. He was born in Saint Andrew Parish, Jamaica. He died aged 72 in Cuba on 9 April 2014, after having suffered a fall while hiking in Dominica in early 2014. He had been a member of the United Nations Committee on Development Policy since 2009, and in 2010 was appointed the UN Secretary-General Ban Ki-moon's personal representative on the Guyana-Venezuela border controversy. He was Professor Emeritus of the University of the West Indies (UWI).

== Education ==
Born in Saint Andrew Parish, Jamaica, Norman Girvan attended Calabar High School in Kingston, and in 1959 entered the University College of the West Indies, where he received his bachelor's degree in Economics. He earned his PhD in Economics from the London School of Economics, UK. In the 1960s, he was a member of the C. L. R. James study group in London that also included Walter Rodney. Girvan was fluent in English and Spanish.

== Research and publications ==
He was Professorial Research Fellow at the UWI Graduate Institute of International Relations at the University of the West Indies in St. Augustine, Trinidad and Tobago. He was formerly the Secretary General of the Association of Caribbean States, Professor of Development Studies and Director of the Sir Arthur Lewis Institute of Social and Economic Studies at the University of the West Indies, and head of the National Planning Agency of the Government of Jamaica.

Professor Girvan had done research and published on foreign investment and multinational corporations, the mining industry, technology, the IMF and external debt, social development, Caribbean integration, and economic thought.

He also served on the Steering Committee of the Critical Development Studies Network, based at the Academic Unit in Development Studies, Autonomous University of Zacatecas, Mexico.

=== Books and monographs ===
- The Caribbean Bauxite Industry. Institute of Social and Economic Research (ISER), University of the West Indies (UWI), 1967, pp. 45.
- "Multinational Corporations and Dependent Underdevelopment in Mineral-Export Economies", New Haven: Economic Growth Center, Yale University, Center Paper No. 182, 1970; also in Social and Economic Studies, 19, 4 (December 1970), pp. 490–526.
- Foreign Capital and Economic Underdevelopment in Jamaica. ISER/UWI, 1971, pp. 282.
- Copper in Chile: A Study in Conflict between Corporate and National Economy. ISER/UWI, 1972, pp. 86.
- Corporate Imperialism, Conflict and Expropriation: Essays in Transnational Corporations and Economic Nationalism in the Third World. New York; Myron E. Sharpe, 1976; and Monthly Review Press, 1978. pp. 241.
- (With R. Bernal and W. Hughes) "The IMF and the Third World: The Case of Jamaica". Uppsala: Dag Hammarskjöld Foundation, 1980, pp. 42. Also in Development Dialogue, 1980, 2; and in Spanish in Cuadernos Economico Trimestrales, No. 3 (December 1980), Havana; and extracts reprinted in Yash Ghai, Robin Luckam, and Francis Snyder (eds), The Political Economy of Law: A Third World Reader. Delhi: Oxford University Press, 1987.
- Technology Policies for Small Developing Economies: A Study of the Caribbean. ISER/UWI, 1983, pp. 224.
- (With Kurt Hoffman) Managing International Technology Transfer: A Strategic Approach for Developing Countries. Ottawa: IDRC MR259e; April 1990, pp. 311.
- (With E. Rodriguez et al.) The Debt Problem of Small Peripheral Economies: Case Studies of the Caribbean and Central America. Kingston: Association of Caribbean Economists in collaboration with Friedrich Ebert Stiftung, 1990. (Also published in Caribbean Studies, 24, 1–2; January–June 1991.) JSTOR 25613024
- "Societies at Risk? The Caribbean and Global Change". Paris: UNESCO, Management of Social Transformation (MOST) Discussion Paper No. 17, 1997. (Summary published in Boletin de Economia, April–June 1998, San Juan: Unidad de Investigaciones Economicas, Universidad de Puerto Rico, Rio Piedras.)
- Aspects of the Political Economy of Race in the Caribbean and the Americas, Institute of the Black World, Atlanta, GA, 1975.

=== Selected articles ===
- "Towards a Single Development Vision and the Role of the Single Economy" (in collaboration with the CARICOM Secretariat and the Task Force on the CSME). Approved by the 28th CARICOM Heads of Government Conference, July 2007.
- "Power Imbalances and Development Knowledge". Paper prepared for North-South Institute Project in Reform of the International Development Architecture, September 2007.
- "Home Grown Solutions and Ownership". Prepared for OECD Development Forum, Workshop on Ownership in Practice, Paris, 27 September 2007.
- "Learning to Integrate: The Experience of Monitoring the CARICOM Single Market and Economy", in De Lombaerde, Philippe; Antoni Estevadeordal and Kati Suominen (eds), Governing Regional Integration for Development: Monitoring Experiences, Methods and Prospects. Ashgate: 2008. Chapter 3, pp. 31–56.
- Cooperation in the Greater Caribbean: The Role of the Association of Caribbean States. Kingston: Ian Randle Publishers, 2006; pp. 214.
- "Lessons from the struggle for a new International Technology Order", in Henry Veltmeyer (ed.), Development in an Era of Neoliberal Globalization, Ashgate, 2013.
- "Extractive imperialism in historical perspective", in Henry Veltmeyer (ed.), Extractive Imperialism in the Americas, Leiden: Brill, 2014.
