= Stephen Henderson (literary scholar) =

American professor and scholar (1925–1997)

- Born: Stephen Evangelist Henderson; October 13, 1925; Key West, Florida, United States
- Died: January 7, 1997 (aged 71); Langley Park, Maryland, United States
- Occupation(s): Professor and scholar
- Notable work: Understanding the New Black Poetry: Black Speech and Black Music as Poetic Reference (1973)

'Stephen Evangelist Henderson (October 13, 1925 – January 7, 1997) was an American literary critic and professor of African-American literature and culture whose work was closely associated with HBCUs. He taught at Virginia Union University, Morehouse College, the Institute of the Black World (IBW) and Howard University, where he directed the Institute for the Arts and the Humanities.

His anthology and critical study Understanding the New Black Poetry: Black Speech and Black Music as Poetic References (1973) is widely regarded as a foundational work of Black Arts Movement criticism and Black aesthetics, combining an extended theoretical introduction with an influential selection of contemporary Black poetry.

Henderson was a co-founder of the IBW in Atlanta, a black intellectual “think tank” created with Vincent Harding and William Strickland that linked scholarship to Black political activism in the 1970s.

== Early life and education ==
Henderson was born in Key West, Florida, on October 13, 1925, to James and Leonora (Sands) Henderson, a working-class family with Bahamian and Gullah roots.

During the final years of the Second World War Henderson served for two years in the United States Army.

He earned a bachelor's degree in English and sociology with high honors in 1949. Henderson went on to the University of Wisconsin, where he completed a master's degree in English in 1950 and later a PhD in English and art history in 1959.

== Career ==
In 1950, he became a professor of English at Virginia Union University, which post he held until 1962, meanwhile obtaining a PhD in English and Art History (1959). In 1962 he took an appointment as chair of the English department at Morehouse, and from 1969 for two years was as a senior research fellow at the Institute for the Black World in Atlanta, before in 1971 taking on professorship at Howard University in Washington, D.C., teaching in the departments of English and African American Studies. He was director of the Institute for the Arts and the Humanities at Howard (1973–85), and also lectured in the US and abroad.

Henderson's 1973 book Understanding the New Black Poetry: Black Speech and Black Music as Poetic Reference is regarded as a seminal work that has been "heralded as the first formalized articulation of a theoretical understanding of African-American poetry and sparked new debate and dialogue in the world of African-American literature."

Henderson retired in 1992 and died aged 71 at his home in Langley Park, Maryland, on January 7, 1997.

== Personal life ==
Henderson married Jeanne Holman on June 14, 1958, and the couple had four sons: Stephen E. Jr., Timothy A., Philip L. and Alvin Malcolm.

One of his sons, Phil Henderson (also known as Philip Lewis or P. Lewis), is a novelist and essayist.

== Selected works ==
- (With Mercer Cook) The Militant Black Writer in Africa and the United States, University of Wisconsin Press, 1969.
- Understanding the New Black Poetry: Black Speech and Black Music as Poetic References, Morrow, 1973.
