= Institute of the Black World =

Former think tank based in Atlanta, Georgia

- Abbreviation: IBW
- Formation: 1969; 57 years ago
- Dissolved: 1983; 43 years ago
- Location: Atlanta, Georgia

The Institute of the Black World (IBW) was a think tank based in Atlanta, Georgia, which was founded and directed by African diaspora intellectuals from 1969 to 1983. Led primarily by Vincent Harding, it was originally a project of the Martin Luther King Jr. Center for Nonviolent Social Change and is described by the historian Derrick E. White as "a collection of activist-intellectuals who analyzed the educational, political, and activist landscape to further the Black Freedom Struggle in the wake of King's assassination." In addition to Harding, Stephen Henderson and William Strickland (of the University of Massachusetts) formed the core leadership in the early years of the IBW.

The IBW sought to build connections across a range of diverse Black approaches, including Black nationalism, integrationism, and Marxism, and in particular sought to reach three audiences: first, Black scholars developing Black Studies programs; secondly, Black elected officials; and thirdly, grassroots organizations. Its participants included nationalists John Henrik Clark and Julius Lester, integrationists such as C. T. Vivian, Walter Franklin Anderson, and a significant number of intellectuals from outside of the United States, particularly the Caribbean, including Marxist theorist C. L. R. James, retired diplomat Tran Van Dinh, cultural theorist Sylvia Wynter, historians Robert A. Hill and Walter Rodney, and economists George Beckford and Norman Girvan.

The IBW's own orientation has been described as "pragmatic Black nationalism... rooted in specific issues such as Black Studies or the creation of a black political agenda for the seventies; thus, its pragmatism critically engaged and employed the best practices from a variety of ideological perspectives, including cultural and political nationalism, as well as integration."

The institute "encouraged black artists and developed teaching materials for black children", and among its projects was the Black Policy Studies Center.

The organization was based on Chestnut Street in Atlanta, in the house where W. E. B. Du Bois once lived. The IBW closed in 1983.

In 2001, an organization of a similar name was formed, called Institute of the Black World 21st Century (IBW21), founded by Ron Daniels and based in Elmhurst, New York, and in Baltimore, Maryland.
