= Hector Wynter =

Jamaican editor and politician (1926–2002)

The Honourable Hector Wynter OJ
- Born: Hector Lincoln Wynter; 7 July 1926; Camagüey, Republic of Cuba
- Died: 31 December 2002 (aged 76); Mona, St Andrew, Jamaica
- Education: Exeter College, Oxford
- Occupations: Editor and diplomat
- Political party: Jamaican Labour Party (JLP)
- Spouses: Jacqueline "Jackie" Antrobus (m. 1956; div. 1969) Diana Ayee Wynter (m. 1969)
- Children: 7, including Brian Wynter
- Relatives: Sylvia Wynter (sister)
- Awards: Rhodes Scholarship (1949)

Hector Lincoln Wynter OJ (7 July 1926 – 31 December 2002) was a Jamaican educator, editor, diplomat and politician of the Jamaica Labour Party (JLP).

== Early life and education ==
Hector Wynter was born in Camagüey, Republic of Cuba, on 27 July 1926 to the tailor Percival Wynter and his wife, the actress Lola Maude Wynter (née Reid), known for her performance as Miss Birdie in the popular radio soap opera Life in Hopeful Village (1963–76).

Wynter was educated at St. Simon's College and at Wolmer's Boys' High School, where he was captain of the track team, played cricket and boxed. He went on to study at the University of Havana in Cuba where he attained a Teacher's Certificate in 1946. In 1948, he received an Issa Scholarship, winning a Rhodes scholarship from the University of Oxford in England the subsequent year. From 1949 to 1952, Wynter studied at Exeter College, Oxford, reading for a Bachelor of Arts (BA) degree in Modern Languages. In Oxford, he was associated with a circle of international students and post-graduates that included fellow Jamaicans Evan Jones and Neville Dawes. Wynter then went on to the University of London, graduating with a Diploma of Education in 1953. That same year, he undertook three months' training with the United Nations (UN) as a British representative in the Education Section of their Department of Information. He received his Master of Arts (MA) degree from Oxford in 1956.

== Career ==
Upon returning to Jamaica, Wynter taught Spanish at Calabar High School, Kingston, and, from 1955, lectured at the University of the West Indies as a professor of Spanish and director of the Extra-Mural Studies Department.

After demonstrating his early commitment to young people through his service in the educational sector, Wynter went on to apply himself in politics. The Jamaican journalist George Lawson remarked on his impact:

[Wynter was] a driving force behind the Jamaica Labour Party Government's effort to engage the youths in something meaningful that would [...] make them good men and women of the future [and] keep them away from, drugs, prison and the street.

After Jamaica gained independence from Britain in 1962, Wynter was a member of the first Jamaican Senate. In 1963, he was appointed as the first Jamaican High Commissioner in Trinidad and Tobago. Wynter was Parliamentary Secretary in the State Department and the Special Assistant to the Prime Minister for External Affairs from 1965 to 1967, and then served as Minister of Education from 1967 to 1969 and at the Ministry of Youth from 1969 to 1972. In the Jamaica Labour Party (JLP), he exercised the office of Chairman from 1970 to 1972.

Wynter was appointed Permanent Representative of Jamaica to UNESCO, from 1970 to 1976, and Member of the Executive Council of UNESCO from 1981 to 1985. From 1974 to 1976, he was Chairman of this body. According to the citation read at the ceremony awarding him the Order of Jamaica, while at UNESCO, Wynter had "projected Jamaica's image in international forums 'more than any other single person in the decades of the sixties and seventies'".

In 1974, Wynter became Executive Editor at The Gleaner, Jamaica's most influential newspaper, then Editor-in-Chief in 1976. He held these posts during the Jamaican political conflict and came into confrontation with the ruling pro-socialist People's National Party (PNP), especially when Prime Minister Michael Manley declared a state of emergency. In 1985, Wynter was instrumental in the founding of the Bustamante Institute of Public Affairs, "which seeks to promote the ideals of Sir Alexander Bustamante, the country's first Prime Minister".

=== Positions and appointments ===
- Co-founder of the Jamaica Youth Movement (1942);
- President of the Jamaica Youth Movement (1945–8);
- Secretary to the Secondary Schools Teacher Association (1945–9);
- Teacher of Spanish, Calabar High School (1945–9);
- Resident Tutor, Department, of Extramural Studies, University of West Indies (1953–5);
- Senior Assistant Registrar, University of West Indies (1955–61);
- Director Extra-Mural Studies, University of West Indies (1963);
- Senator, Parliament of Jamaica (1962–72);
- High Commissioner, Trinidad and Tobago (1963–4);
- Registrar, University of West Indies (1964–5);
- Parliamentary Secretary and Special Assistant to the Prime Minister on External Affairs (1965–7);
- Minister of State for Education (1967–9);
- Minister of State for Youth and Development (1969–72);
- Member of the Executive Board of UNESCO (1970–6; 1981–5);
- Chairman 76, Chairman Finance Committee (1972–4);
- Representative UNESCO Institute Program for Development of Communication (1986–2002);
- Executive; Director Gleaner Company (1979–88);
- Chairman Bustamente Institute of Public and Institute Affairs (1984–90);
- Executive Secretary Caribbean Democratic Union (1990–2002);
- Director Projects Association of Caribbean Universities (1973);
- Executive Board Institute Press Institute;
- Chairman New Radio Company of Jamaica (1989–2002);

== Honours ==
- In 1981, Wynter was awarded the Order of Jamaica.

== Personal life ==
Hector Wynter was one of four children born to Percival and Lola Maude Wynter (née Reid). His sisters are Sylvia Wynter and Etta Wynter Rowe; his brother is Basil Wynter.

On 1 September 1956, Wynter married English teacher and UNESCO representative Jacqueline "Jackie" Antrobus (b. 1933, Layou, Saint Vincent, d. 16 June 2006), whom he divorced in 1969. They had three children: Astrid Wynter (Senior Operations Advisor at the Inter-American Development Bank (IDB) in The Bahamas), Brian Wynter (Governor of the Bank of Jamaica since 2009), and Colin Wynter (a barrister-at-law in London, specialising in insurance).

On 31 December 1969, Hector Wynter married his second wife, Diana Ayee Wynter (b. 5 May 1946), with whom he had three children: Sara-Jean Wynter Martin, Mark Wynter, and actor and model Lincoln Wynter (also known as Hector Lincoln).

After a traffic accident on 27 December 2002, Hector Wynter was taken to the Hospital of the University of the West Indies in Mona, where he succumbed to his injuries a few days later.
