= Sylvia Wynter =

Jamaican writer (born 1928)

The Honourable Sylvia Wynter OJ
- Born: 11 May 1928 (age 98); Holguín, Republic of Cuba
- Education: St Andrew High School for Girls; King's College London (BA, MA)
- Occupations: Novelist; playwright; critic; philosopher; essayist
- Partner: Jan Carew
- Relatives: Hector Wynter (brother); Brian Wynter (nephew); Colin Wynter KC (nephew)
- Writing career
- Notable work: The Hills of Hebron (1962) Black Metamorphosis (unpublished)

Sylvia Wynter OJ (born 11 May 1928) is a Jamaican novelist, dramatist, critic, philosopher, and essayist. Her work combines insights from the natural sciences, the humanities, art, and anti-colonial struggles in order to unsettle what she refers to as the "overrepresentation of Man". Black studies, economics, history, neuroscience, psychoanalysis, literary analysis, film analysis, and philosophy are some of the fields she draws on in her scholarly work.

== Biography ==
Sylvia Wynter was born in Holguín, Cuba, to Jamaican parents, the tailor Percival Wynter and his wife, actress Lola Maude (née Reid). At the age of two, she, her brother Hector Wynter and their parents returned to their home country of Jamaica. She attended the Ebenezer Primary School in Kingston and, at the age of nine, won a scholarship to attend the St Andrew High School for Girls, also in Kingston. In 1946, she competed for and won the Jamaica Centenary Scholarship for Girls, which took her to King's College London to read for her Bachelor of Arts degree in modern languages (Spanish) from 1947 to 1951. She was awarded her MA in December 1953 for her thesis, a critical edition of a Spanish comedia, A lo que obliga el honor.

In 1956, Wynter met the Guyanese actor and novelist Jan Carew, who became her second husband. In 1958, she completed Under the Sun, a full-length stage play, which was bought by the Royal Court Theatre in London. In 1962, Wynter published her only novel, The Hills of Hebron, based on Under the Sun.

After separating from Carew in the early 1960s, Wynter returned to academia, and in 1963, was appointed assistant lecturer in Hispanic literature at the Mona campus of the University of the West Indies. She remained there until 1974. During this time the Jamaican government commissioned her to write the play 1865–A Ballad for a Rebellion, about the Morant Bay rebellion, and a biography of Sir Alexander Bustamante, the first prime minister of independent Jamaica.

In 1974, Wynter was invited by the Department of Literature at the University of California at San Diego (UCSD) to be a professor of Comparative and Spanish Literature and to lead a new program in Third World literature. She left UCSD in 1977 to become chairperson of African and Afro-American Studies, and professor of Spanish in the Department of Spanish and Portuguese at Stanford University, where she worked until 1997. She is now Professor Emerita at Stanford University.

In the mid to late 1960s, Wynter began writing critical essays addressing her interests in Caribbean, Latin American, and Spanish history and literatures. In 1968 and 1969, she published a two-part essay proposing to transform scholars' very approach to literary criticism, "We Must Learn to Sit Down Together and Talk About a Little Culture: Reflections on West Indian Writing and Criticism". Wynter has since written numerous essays in which she seeks to rethink the fullness of human ontologies, which, she argues, have been curtailed by what she describes as an over-representation of (western bourgeois) Man as if it/he were the only available mode of complete humanness. She suggests how multiple knowledge sources and texts might frame our worldview differently.

In 2010, Sylvia Wynter was awarded the Order of Jamaica (OJ) for services in the fields of education, history, and culture.

== Critical work ==
Sylvia Wynter's scholarly work is highly poetic, expository, and complex. Her long career has seen her work on a range of marxist and decolonial issues with an analytic framework drawn from her wide-ranging, multi-disciplinary reading. She draws from anthropology, sociology, philosophy, cognitive science, and history.

Starting with a basis in literary criticism, Wynter moved through a marxist analysis of the Iberian colonial pieza system in her monumental Black Metamorphosis, toward a cultural analysis grounded in the politics of being from the perspective of Fanon's autophobic subject. She analyzes how marginalized cultural formations like Myal, Rastafari, Vodou, and Jonkonnu, provide a zero ground and catalytic zone of resistance against European hegemony.

Her work attempts to elucidate the development and maintenance of colonial modernity and modern man, and the possibility of resistance to its overrepresentation as the human, rather than one among many 'genres of the human.' She deftly interweaves science, philosophy, literary theory, and critical race theory to explain how European man came to be considered the epitome of humanity, "Man 2" or "the figure of man". Wynter's theoretical framework has changed and deepened over the years.

In her essay "Towards the Sociogenic Principle: Fanon, Identity, the Puzzle of Conscious Experience, and What It Is Like to be 'Black'", Wynter developed a theoretical framework she refers to as the "sociogenic principle", which would become central to her work. Wynter derives this theory from an analysis of Frantz Fanon's notion of "sociogeny". Wynter argues that Fanon's theorization of sociogeny envisions human being (or experience) as not merely biological, but also based in stories and symbolic meanings generated within culturally specific contexts. Sociogeny as a theory therefore overrides, and cannot be understood within, Cartesian dualism for Wynter. The social and the cultural influence the biological.

In her essay "Unsettling the Coloniality of Being/Power/Truth/Freedom: Towards the Human, After Man, Its Overrepresentation—An Argument", Wynter’s genealogy of "Man" offers a radical critique of Western humanism by tracing how the category of the human has been historically constructed. Her framework outlines a progression from Christian Man to Man1 and then Man2, each iteration reinforcing systems of exclusion and domination under the guise of universality.

The first configuration, Christian Man, emerged during medieval Europe. In this formulation, "Man" was defined primarily in theological terms. The ideal human was a Christian subject, whose purpose was salvation through alignment with divine law. This concept was fundamentally spiritual and moral, centering Europe as the site of truth and divine favor. Non-Christians—pagans, Muslims, Jews, and Indigenous peoples—were dehumanized as infidels and excluded from this spiritual-humanist ideal.

This model was replaced during the Renaissance and Enlightenment by Man1, associated with secular humanism and the rise of liberal rationality, also known as homo politicus. Man1 redefined the human in terms of reason, science, and empiricism, marking a shift from religious to political and rational criteria. Rooted in the works of figures like Descartes and Locke, this "rational Man" was implicitly white, male, bourgeois, and European. Wynter critiques this version of the human for universalizing a narrow, Eurocentric identity while excluding vast populations deemed irrational, primitive, or underdeveloped. Man1 enabled and justified transatlantic slavery, colonialism, and racial hierarchy by grounding difference in nature and reason.

The most recent formation, Man2, develops through the rise of biocentric and evolutionary thinking in the 19th and 20th centuries. Here, the human is framed through the lens of Darwinian biology, economic behavior, and technocratic knowledge. Man2 becomes the homo oeconomicus of neoliberalism—an entrepreneurial, self-maximizing subject. This version of the human, while more secular and "objective", still preserves racial and class exclusions by linking human worth to economic productivity and scientific rationality. It represents a continuation of the colonial logic, now masked by ostensibly post-racial, meritocratic ideals.

Wynter’s genealogy reveals how each version of "Man" institutionalizes a "code of symbolic life and death", a hijacking of what Danielli calls the "internal reward system" of human cognition, determining perceptions of who is fully human and who is not. She argues for a new conception of the human, building on the Fanonian "third event" of sociogeny, by which we can propose a Human that is both bios and logos, nature and culture. As such, she proposes a notion of species that moves beyond the overrepresentation of the Western, bourgeois, white male subject, and more generally, the dehumanizing biocentric notion of Man put into place by Europe since the 19th century. Her project calls for the reinvention of the human outside colonial and biocentric logics toward a plural, hybrid humanity grounded in poetics and culture, what she calls homo narrans (story-telling human) as we are shaped and continuously re-shape ourselves through the narratives we create.

== Works ==
=== Novel ===
- The Hills of Hebron. London: Jonathan Cape, 1962. Extracted in Daughters of Africa (1992), ed. Margaret Busby.

=== Critical text ===
- Do Not Call Us Negros: How Multicultural Textbooks Perpetuate Racism (1992)
- We Must Learn to Sit Down Together and Talk About a Little Culture: Decolonizing Essays 1967–1984 (2022)

=== Drama ===
- Miracle in Lime Lane (1959)
- Shh... It's a Wedding (1961)
- 1865 – A Ballad for a Rebellion (1965)
- The House and Land of Mrs. Alba (1968)
- Rockstone Anancy (1970)
- Maskarade (1973)

=== Film ===
- The Big Pride (1961), with Jan Carew

=== Essays/criticism ===
- "The Instant-Novel Now". New World Quarterly 3.3 (1967): 78–81.
- "Lady Nugent's Journal". Jamaica Journal 1:1 (1967): 23–34.
- "We Must Learn to Sit Down Together and Talk about a Little Culture: Reflections on West Indian Writing and Criticism: Part One". Jamaica Journal 2:4 (1968): 23–32.
- "We Must Learn to Sit Down Together and Talk about a Little Culture: Reflections on West Indian Writing and Criticism: Part Two". Jamaica Journal 3:1 (1969): 27–42.
- "Book Reviews: Michael Anthony Green Days by the River and The Games Were Coming". Caribbean Studies 9.4 (1970): 111–118.
- "Jonkonnu in Jamaica: Towards the Interpretation of the Folk Dance as a Cultural Process". Jamaica Journal 4:2 (1970): 34–48.
- "Novel and History, Plot and Plantation". Savacou 5 (1971): 95–102.
- "Creole Criticism: A Critique". New World Quarterly 5:4 (1972): 12–36.
- "One-Love—Rhetoric or Reality?—Aspects of Afro-Jamaicanism". Caribbean Studies 12:3 (1972): 64–97.
- "After Word". High Life for Caliban. By Lemuel Johnson. Ardis, 1973.
- "Ethno or Socio Poetics". Alcheringa/Ethnopoetics 2:2 (1976): 78–94.
- "The Eye of the Other". Blacks in Hispanic Literature: Critical Essays. Ed. Miriam DeCosta-Willis. Kennikat Press, 1977. 8–19.
- "A Utopia from the Semi-Periphery: Spain, Modernization, and the Enlightenment". Science Fiction Studies 6:1 (1979): 100–107.
- "History, Ideology, and the Reinvention of the Past in Achebe's Things Fall Apart and Laye's The Dark Child". Minority Voices 2:1 (1978): 43–61.
- "Sambos and Minstrels". Social Text 1 (Winter 1979): 149–156.
- "In Quest of Matthew Bondsman: Some Cultural Notes on the Jamesian Journey". Urgent Tasks 12 (Summer 1981).
- Beyond Liberal and Marxist Leninist Feminisms: Towards an Autonomous Frame of Reference, Institute for Research on Women and Gender, 1982.
- "New Seville and the Conversion Experience of Bartolomé de Las Casas: Part One". Jamaica Journal 17:2 (1984): 25–32.
- "New Seville and the Conversion Experience of Bartolomé de Las Casas: Part Two". Jamaica Journal 17:3 (1984): 46–55.
- "The Ceremony Must Be Found: After Humanism". Boundary II 12:3 & 13:1 (1984): 17–70.
- "On Disenchanting Discourse: 'Minority' Literary Criticism and Beyond". Cultural Critique 7 (Fall 1987): 207–44.
- "Beyond the Word of Man: Glissant and the New Discourse of the Antilles". World Literature Today 63 (Autumn 1989): 637–647.
- "Beyond Miranda's Meanings: Un/Silencing the 'Demonic Ground' of Caliban's Women". Out of the Kumbla: Caribbean Women and Literature. Ed. Carole Boyce Davies and Elaine Savory Fido. Africa World Press, 1990. 355–372.
- "Columbus and the Poetics of the Propter Nos". Annals of Scholarship 8:2 (1991): 251–286.
- "Tras el 'Hombre,' su última palabra: Sobre el posmodernismo, les damnés y el principio sociogénico". La teoría política en la encrucijada descolonial. Nuevo Texto Crítico, Año IV, No. 7, (Primer Semester de 1991): 43–83.
- "'Columbus, The Ocean Blue and 'Fables that Stir the Mind': To Reinvent the Study of Letters". Poetics of the Americas: Race, Founding and Textuality 8:2 (1991): 251–286.
- "Rethinking 'Aesthetics': Notes Towards a Deciphering Practice". Ex-iles: Essays on Caribbean Cinema. Ed. Mbye Cham. Africa World Press, 1992. 238–279.
- "'No Humans Involved': An open letter to my colleagues". Voices of the African Diaspora 8:2 (1992).
- "Beyond the Categories of the Master Conception: The Counterdoctrine of the Jamesian Poiesis". C.L.R. James's Caribbean. Ed. Paget Henry and Paul Buhle. Duke University Press, 1992. 63–91.
- "But What Does Wonder Do? Meanings, Canons, Too?: On Literary Texts, Cultural Contexts, and What It's Like to Be One/Not One of Us". Stanford Humanities Review 4:1 (1994).
- "The Pope Must Have Been Drunk, the King of Castile a Madman: Culture as Actuality and the Caribbean Rethinking of Modernity". Reordering of Culture: Latin America, the Caribbean and Canada in the 'Hood. (1995): 17–42.
- "1492: A New World View" (1995), Race, Discourse, and the Origin of the Americas: A New World View. Ed. Sylvia Wynter, Vera Lawrence Hyatt, and Rex Nettleford. Smithsonian Institution Press, 1995. 5–57.
- "Is 'Development' a Purely Empirical Concept, or also Teleological?: A Perspective from 'We the Underdeveloped'". Prospects for Recovery and Sustainable Development in Africa. Ed. Aguibou Y. Yansané. Greenwood, 1996. 299–316.
- "Columbus, the Ocean Blue, and 'Fables That Stir the Mind': To Reinvent the Study of Letters". Poetics of the Americas: Race, Founding and Textuality. Ed. Bainard Cowan and Jefferson Humphries. Louisiana State University Press, 1997. 141–163.
- "'Genital Mutilation' or 'Symbolic Birth?' Female Circumcision, Lost Origins, and the Aculturalism of Feminist/Western Thought". Case Western Reserve Law Review 47.2 (1997): 501–552.
- "Black Aesthetic". The Encyclopedia of Aesthetics. Vol. 1. Oxford University Press, 1998. 273–281.
- "Africa, The West and the Analogy of Culture: The Cinematic Text After Man". Symbolic Narratives/African Cinema: Audiences, Theory and the Moving Image. Ed. June Givanni. London British Film Institute, 2000. 25–76.
- "The Re-Enchantment of Humanism: An Interview with Sylvia Wynter", Small Axe 8 (2000): 119–207.
- "'A Different Kind of Creature': Caribbean Literature, the Cyclops Factor and the Second Poetics of the Propter Nos". Annals of Scholarship 12:1/2 (2001).
- "Towards the Sociogenic Principle: Fanon, Identity, the Puzzle of Conscious Experience, and What It Is Like to be 'Black'". National Identities and Socio-Political Changes in Latin America. Ed. Mercedes F. Durán-Cogan and Antonio Gómez-Moriana. New York: Routledge, 2001. 30–66.
- "Unsettling the Coloniality of Being/Power/Truth/Freedom: Towards the Human, After Man, Its Overrepresentation – An Argument". CR: The New Centennial Review 3.3 (2003): 257–337.
- "On How We Mistook the Map for the Territory and Re-Imprisoned Ourselves in Our Unbearable Wrongness of Being, of Désêtre: Black Studies Toward the Human Project". Not Only the Master's Tools: African-American Studies in Theory and Practice. Eds. Lewis R. Gordon and Jane Anna Gordon. Paradigm, 2006. 107–169.
- "Proud Flesh Inter/Views Sylvia Wynter". Greg Thomas. ProudFlesh: A New Afrikan Journal of Culture, Politics & Consciousness 4 (2006).
- "Human Being as Noun, or Being Human as Praxis?: On the Laws/Modes of Auto-Institution and our Ultimate Crisis of Global Warming and Climate Change". Paper presented in the Distinguished Lecture and Residency at the Center for African American Studies, Wesleyan University, April 23, 2008.
- "Unparalleled Catastrophe for Our Species? Or, to Give Humanness a Different Future: Conversations". Interview. Sylvia Wynter: On Being Human as Praxis. Duke, 2014. 9–89.
- "The Ceremony Found: Towards the Autopoetic Turn/Overturn, its Autonomy of Human Agency, and the Extraterritoriality of (Self-)Cognition". Black Knowledges/Black Struggles: Essays in Critical Epistemology. Eds Jason R. Ambroise and Sabine Broeck. Liverpool, UK: Liverpool University Press, 2015. 184–252.
- Black Metamorphosis: New Natives in a New World (unpublished manuscript)

== Sources ==
- Buck, Claire (ed.), Bloomsbury Guide to Women's Literature. London: Bloomsbury, 1992. ISBN 0-7475-0895-X
- Wynter, Sylvia, and David Scott. "The Re-Enchantment of Humanism: An Interview with Sylvia Wynter". Small Axe, 8 (September 2000): 119–207.
- Wynter, Sylvia. "Unsettling the Coloniality of Being/Power/Truth/Freedom: Towards the Human, After Man, Its Overrepresentation—An Argument". CR: The New Centennial Review, Volume 3, Number 3, Fall 2003, pp. 257–337.
