= Juan Pérez de la Riva =

Cuban historian

Juan Pérez de la Riva (1913-1976) was a Cuban historian known for his studies of the coolie trade on the island. He was professor of humanities at the University of Havana.

== Selected publications ==
- Los culíes chinos en Cuba
- Conquista del espacio cubano
- El barracón y otros ensayos (1973)
- Para la historia de la gente sin historia (1976)
