= Robert A. Hill (historian) =

Jamaican historian and academic (born 1943)

- Born: October 1943 (age 82–83); Kingston, Jamaica
- Education: St George's College; University of London; University of Toronto; University of the West Indies, Mona
- Occupations: Historian and academic
- Known for: The Marcus Garvey and Universal Negro Improvement Association Papers

Robert A. Hill (born October 1943) is a Jamaican historian and academic who moved to the United States in the 1970s. He is Professor Emeritus of History and Research Professor at the University of California, Los Angeles (UCLA), and Visiting Fellow at The Sir Arthur Lewis Institute of Social and Economic Studies (SALISES), University of the West Indies at Mona, Jamaica.

A leading scholar on Marcus Garvey, Hill has lectured and written widely on the Garvey movement, and has been editor-in-chief of The Marcus Garvey and Universal Negro Improvement Association Papers for more than 30 years. Reviewing the first volume in 1984, Eric Foner wrote: "'The Marcus Garvey and Universal Negro Improvement Association Papers' will take its place among the most important records of the Afro-American experience."

Hill is also literary executor of the estate of C. L. R. James and General Editor of The C.L.R. James Archives, Duke University Press.

== Life and career ==
Robert "Bobby" Hill was born in Kingston, Jamaica (his father Stephen O. D. Hill was a renowned impresario on the island), where he attended St George's College. His early interest in Marcus Garvey and his work was initiated by his late uncles, Frank Augustus Hill, a renowned journalist and labour activist, and Ken Hill, then Mayor of Kingston. Hill received further education at the University of London, the University of Toronto and the University of the West Indies, Mona, where he obtained a master's degree in Political Science, his thesis focusing on "Marcus Garvey’s Political Activities in Jamaica between 1927 and 1935".

Hill subsequently held appointments at Dartmouth College, the Institute of the Black World in Atlanta, Georgia (Research Fellow, 1971), and in 1972 became Associate Professor in the Department of African-American Studies Northwestern University, Evanston, Illinois (1972–77).

== The Marcus Garvey and Universal Negro Improvement Association Papers ==
Based since 1977 at the University of California, Los Angeles, Hill established The Marcus Garvey and Universal Negro Improvement Association Papers Project there, within the James S. Coleman African Studies Center, and is Editor-in-Chief of the 13 volumes that have been published since 1983. A 1984 article by C. Gerald Fraser in The New York Times said: "The seed for the Garvey papers project was planted when Mr. Hill was 18 years old. Two incidents inspired him to delve further: A talk with his uncle, Frank Augustus Hill, a Jamaican journalist and labor activist to whom the first volume is dedicated, and his winning a national essay prize writing on Garvey, which led to meetings with Garveyites in Jamaica."

According to Clayborne Carson, writing in The Nation, "until the publication of The Marcus Garvey and Universal Negro Improvement Association Papers, many of the documents necessary for a full assessment of Garvey’s thought or of his movement’s significance have not been easily accessible. Robert A. Hill and his staff... have gathered over 30,000 documents from libraries and other sources in many countries.... The Garvey papers will reshape our understanding of the history of black nationalism and perhaps increase our understanding of contemporary black politics."

The first 10 volumes were published by the University of California Press, and Duke University Press took over with Volume XI. Most recently published (2016) is The Marcus Garvey and Universal Negro Improvement Association Papers, Volume XIII: The Caribbean Diaspora, 1921–1922.

== Other literary work ==
Hill has also compiled volumes of other notable documents and publications, including The Black Man Magazine, edited by Marcus Garvey (New York: Kraus Reprint Co., 1977); The Crusader, edited by Cyril V. Briggs (New York: Garland Publishers, 1987); George S. Schuyler's Black Empire (Ithaca, N.Y.: Northeastern University Press, 1991) and Ethiopian Stories (Ithaca, N.Y.: Northeastern University Press, 1994); and The FBI's RACON: Racial Conditions in the United States during World War II (Boston: Northeastern University Press, 1995).

Hill is internationally recognised as a leading authority on Garvey as well as the history of the Garvey movement. He also served on several advisory committees. He was guest curator of the National Endowment for the Humanities-funded Marcus Garvey Centenary Exhibition at the Schomburg Center for Research in Black Culture of New York Public Library, and was an advisor to the Jamaican government on its Garvey centennial.

Having been a personal friend of Walter Rodney — they travelled together to attend the Congress of Black Writers in Montreal, Quebec, Canada, in October 1968 and worked together at the Institute of the Black World — Hill edited and wrote the foreword to Walter Rodney Speaks: The Making of an African Intellectual.

Since 1989, Hill has been literary executor for the estate of C. L. R. James.

Hill was executive consultant for the 2001 PBS film Marcus Garvey: Look for Me in the Whirlwind.

== Archives ==
The Robert A. Hill Papers, 1933–2001, are held in the Archival Collections of Columbia University Libraries.

Guide to the Robert A. Hill Collection, David M. Rubenstein Rare Book & Manuscript Library, Duke University.

== Awards ==
Awards that Hill has received include the Lyman H. Butterfield Award for Distinguished Contribution to Documentary Editing (1992), the Miriam Matthews Award for Outstanding Contribution to the African American Community, the Carter G. Woodson Award for Black History, and the Gold Musgrave Medal of the Institute of Jamaica for Distinguished Contribution to History.

In 2017, Hill received an honorary doctorate from the University of Toronto. The citation described him as "the world’s leading authority on the transnational influence and intellectual currents of Pan Africanism".

== Selected bibliography ==
=== As editor ===
- 1986: Pan-African Biography: Its Relevance to the Study of African History
- 1987: Marcus Garvey: Life and Lessons (with Barbara Bair)
- 1990: Walter Rodney Speaks: The Making of an African Intellectual (Africa World Press)
- 2005: The Rastafari Bible (HarperCollins Religious; ISBN 978-0062513328)
- 2010: Trustee for the Human Community: Ralph J. Bunche, the United Nations, and the Decolonization of Africa (Ohio University Press, ISBN 978-0821419106)
