= Peça =

Unit of value used by enslavers

A peça (Portuguese) (also boa peça, peça da India), in Spanish pieza de India ("piece of India") was a unit of value during the 16th to 18th centuries used in the trade of enslaved people between the Spanish colonies in the Americas and slave traders operating from West Africa through the Portuguese Cape Verde Islands. A peça was used to measure quotas and to assess tariffs. Broadly speaking one peça equated to one healthy male or female enslaved person between 15 and 25 years of age; enslaved people between 25 and 35, and between 8 and 15 years were valued at 2/3 peça with those outside this age range and those infirm being valued lower.

== Background ==
The 1479 Treaty of Alcáçovas divided the Atlantic Ocean and other parts of the globe into two zones of influence, Spanish and Portuguese. The Spanish acquired the west side covering South America and the West Indies, whilst the Portuguese obtained the east side covering the west coast of Africa—and also the Indian Ocean beyond. The Spanish relied on the labour of enslaved African people to make their American colonial project possible, but now lacked any trading or territorial foothold in West Africa, the principal source of enslaved labour. Thus the Spanish were reliant on Portuguese slave traders for all their requirements, and a contract for a specified annual supply was issued by the Spanish king, called the Asiento de Negros, in which units of enslaved people to be traded and taxed were not referred to by a simple head-count, but as piezas de India. It is suggested by Scheider that the term originated in the number of cloths from India exchanged for a person in West Africa.

== Definitions ==
The exact conversion factors between an enslaved person and a pieza de India vary across different sources, but Schneider gives it as follows:

- 1 person aged 16/18-35 = 1 pieza de India;
- 2 persons 12/14 - 16/18 = 1 pieza de India;
- 3 persons 6 - 12/14 = 2 pieza de India;

Sorsby (1975) states that one pieza de Indias indicated a measurement of 7 palmos (one palmo (palm's breadth) being about 8 inches) or quartas. Sorsby states that the term pieza de Indias originated in the mid-17th century and referred to a "prime enslaved male in good physical condition between 14 and 30 years of age and about 4 ft 8 inches tall". It was thus a unit used to enumerate a cargo of enslaved people.

== During British tenure of the Asiento ==
In 1713 the British obtained the Asiento, the monopoly right to supply the Spanish colonies with enslaved people, as a term of the Treaty of Utrecht which closed the War of Spanish Succession. This apparently profitable monopoly was re-granted by the British government to the South Sea Company, formed in 1711, as an inducement for the Company assuming liability for the public debt of the government. Previously the Asiento had been held by the Portuguese and by Genoese, Dutch, and French traders of enslaved people. The Asiento specified that the British would be permitted for the next 30 years to introduce into the Spanish colonies 4,800 piezas de Indias per annum. It also provided for the imposition by the Spanish of an import tax of 33 1/3 pesos on each of the first 4,000 piezas de Indias, the last 800 being duty-free.

== Measurement process ==
On the arrival of South Sea Company ships carrying enslaved people at Spanish ports, the human cargo had to be inspected for health (visita de sanidad) and measured by Spanish local royal officials for conversion from mere headcount into pieza de Indias, in order that the import tax could be assessed and the terms of the Asiento followed with regard to maximum volumes introduced (i.e. supplied). The locally resident company factor (i.e. manager) boarded the ship accompanied by royal Spanish officials, including the president, the fiscal and the escribano de camara. Enslaved people were not measured individually but in groups, using a special tape-measure divided into seven quarter varas, each vara being about 33 inches, about one British yard; thus, one quarter vara was 8 1/4 inches, seven quarters was thus 57 3/4 inches, in other words 4 ft 8 inches, equating to one pieza de Indias. "Deductions were made for physical defects, such as filed teeth, missing limbs and tribal scars, as well as for women, children and old people".

The British factor had instructions from the company to negotiate for the lowest assessment possible in terms of piezas de Indias, thus limiting the import duty payable and leaving scope for more imports within the annual limit set by the Asiento, however payment of bribes for such reductions was deemed uneconomic. One instance of such a company order has survived as follows: Obtain as much indulgence of the royal officers in the measurement of our negros as you can, the usual measurement is 3 for 4 but we would not here be understood that you should buy their favour, believing it will not answer to the Company, for we doubt the introduction each year of even 4,000 negros into the Spanish West Indies & until we exceed that number it cannot be of any advantage to the Company. The enslaved people were however sold by the company on the basis of individual value, thus the pieza de Indias was not relevant to the selling process, only to the process of disembarkation.

== Indulto ==
The measurement unit of pieza de Indias was also used in connection with illegally imported enslaved people, identifiable primarily by absence of Company brand on their skin, who if detected within Spanish territory could be seized by British authorities, as holder of the Asiento, and resold for the company's benefit, on payment per pieza de Indias of compensation of 110 pesos to the deprived owner and a tax of 33 1/3 to the Spanish royal authorities. Thus such captured illegal slaves had to be measured and stated as a fraction of a pieza de Indias. This so-called "right to indult" (from Spanish indulto, 'pardon') illegal enslaved people was granted to the British under Article 37 of the Asiento treaty. It provided much scope for private profit-making by corrupt company officials, as company factors (local managers) received a share of half of the net sale proceeds on resale of the enslaved person, as an incentive to control illegal trading activity, the other half going to the company.

== Ratio ==
The ratio of piezas de Indias to headcounts might be expected to indicate the type or "quality" of enslaved people in any particular group; the higher the ratio the greater the number of prime enslaved males. The use of such a ratio provides data to historians and researchers attempting to estimate genders and ages of enslaved people introduced into different areas, actual headcount figures being unavailable. A representative average ratio during the tenure of the Asiento by the British for all factories and licensed trading posts is 0.79, thus one enslaved person was on average assessed as 0.79 of a pieza de Indias.

== See also ==
- Slavery in colonial Spanish America
