= John Crow Mountains =

Mountain range in Jamaica

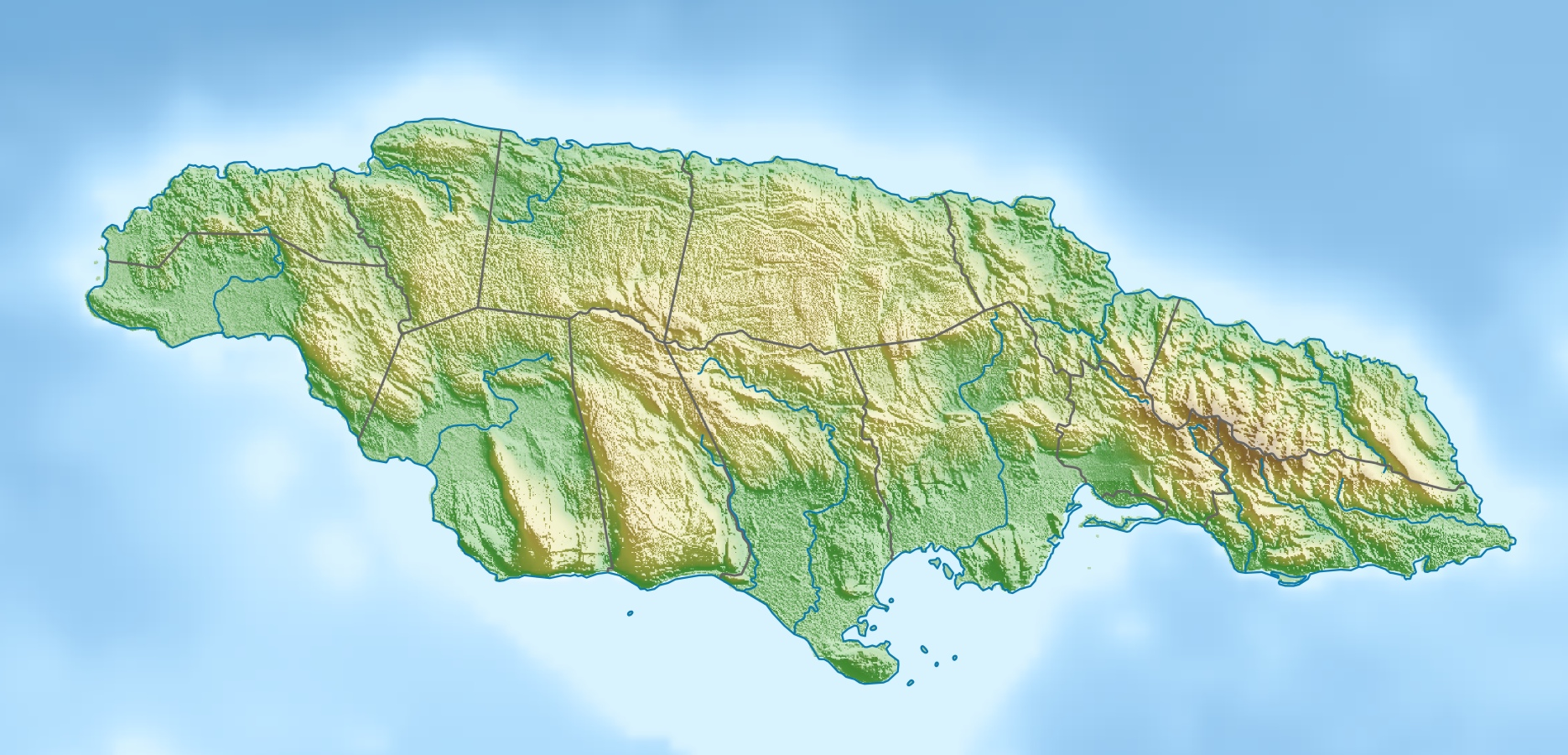
- Location within Jamaica

Highest point
- Elevation: 3,750 ft (1,140 m)
- Coordinates: 18°03′13″N 76°21′17″W

Geography
- Location: Jamaica
- Parent range: John Crow Mountains

UNESCO World Heritage Site
- Official name: Blue and John Crow Mountains
- Type: Mixed
- Criteria: iii, vi, x
- Designated: 2015 (39th session)
- Reference no.: 1356
- Region: Americas

The John Crow Mountains are a range of mountains in eastern Jamaica.

== Etymology ==
The name John Crow was first recorded in the 1820s and comes from the Jamaican name for the turkey vulture. It has been suggested that previous to this, the range was known as the "Carrion Crow Ridge", after an earlier name for the vulture.

== Geography ==
The mountains extend parallel with the north-east coast of the island, bounded to the west by the banks of the Rio Grande, and joining with the eastern end of the Blue Mountains in the south-east. The highest point in the range is a little over 1,140 metres (3,740 ft).

=== Environment ===
The John Crow Mountains are also home to the endangered Papilio homerus, the largest butterfly in the Americas. The most well-studied and understood populations of the dwindling species are found where the John Crow Mountains and the Blue Mountains meet.

The mountains have been designated an Important Bird Area (IBA) by BirdLife International because they support significant populations of many Jamaican bird species.

== History ==
In 1885 Inspector Herbert T. Thomas of the local constabulary began an attempt to reach the highest peak of the range, and in 1890 was successful, publishing an account in his book Untrodden Jamaica. He requested the then governor Sir Henry Blake to consent that they are renamed the Blake Mountains, but admits in his book the change met with opposition. The new name did not stick, and they remain the John Crow Mountains.

In 1920 the explorer Scoresby Routledge claimed to have been the first person to have crossed the John Crow mountains, leading to an exchange of letters in The Times regarding Inspector Thomas's prior claim. The matter was settled by the Jamaican Surveyor-General, who decided that though Thomas had been the first to scale the highest peak, and explore the ridge in a north–south direction, Routledge had traversed the valley and further range beyond: so he had first "actually crossed them from west to east".

== In popular culture ==
In Evan Jones's 1952 poem "The Song of the Banana Man", "John Crow mountain" is mentioned in line 26.
