= Evan Jones (writer) =

Jamaican writer (1927–2023)

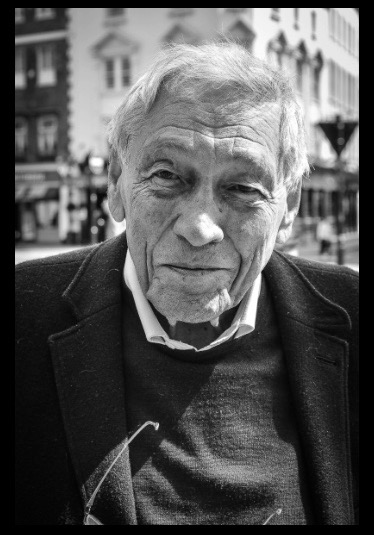
- Jones in 2016
- Born: Evan Gordon Newton Jones; 29 December 1927; Hector's River, Portland, Colony of Jamaica, British Empire
- Died: 18 April 2023 (aged 95); London, England
- Education: Haverford College (BA); Wadham College, Oxford (BA)
- Occupations: Screenwriter; playwright; poet; novelist; columnist; educator
- Spouse: Honora Fergusson (m. 1956; div. 1963) Joanna Vogel (m. 1975)
- Children: Melissa; Sadie
- Relatives: Fred M. Jones (father); Ken Jones (brother)
- Writing career
- Language: English; Jamaican Patois
- Period: 1952–2006
- Genres: Screenplay; poem; play; novel; biography; history; folklore; textbook; opinion journalism; children's fiction
- Notable work: "The Song of the Banana Man" (1949); The Damned (1962); Eva (1962); King and Country (1964); Wake in Fright (1971)
- Notable awards: Martin Luther King Memorial Prize (1976); Doctor Bird Award (1998)

Evan Gordon Newton Jones (29 December 1927 – 18 April 2023) was a Jamaican writer and poet, who lived and worked for much of his career in the United Kingdom. His body of work includes poems, plays, novels, anthologies of Jamaican folklore and motion-picture screenplays. His best-known scripts include The Damned (1962), King and Country (1964), Funeral in Berlin (1966), Two Gentlemen Sharing (1969), Wake in Fright (1971), Escape to Victory (1981) and Champions (1983) and his writing for theatre and television included work for the BBC, ITV and PBS.

Jones was born in Hector's River, Portland Parish, Jamaica, and was educated at Munro College, Haverford College and Wadham College, Oxford. After graduating from Haverford, he undertook relief work in Gaza with the American Friends Service Committee. At Oxford, he wrote "The Song of the Banana Man", a poem which combined Jamaican Patois with English metrical verse and became widely taught in the Caribbean and anthologised internationally.

Jones's professional career began in British television with The Widows of Jaffa and In a Backward Country, both produced by the BBC in the 1950s. In the 1960s he began a major collaboration with Joseph Losey, writing more of Losey's films than any other single screenwriter. He also wrote The Madhouse on Castle Street, a now-lost BBC television play featuring the acting debut of Bob Dylan, and later collaborated with Ted Kotcheff on Two Gentlemen Sharing and Wake in Fright, the latter of which came to be regarded as a landmark of the Australian New Wave.

In the 1970s Jones wrote the BBC/PBS documentary drama series The Fight Against Slavery, which he considered his major work and which won the Martin Luther King Memorial Prize in 1976. He later wrote the novels Stone Haven (1993), regarded as a classic of modern West Indian literature, and Alonso and the Drug Baron (2006). Jones was also a founder member of the Caribbean Artists Movement and wrote political and cultural columns for The Gleaner.

Jones was married first to the American actress Honora Fergusson and later to the English actress Joanna Vogel. He had two daughters, the novelists Melissa and Sadie Jones. He died in London on 18 April 2023, at the age of 95.

== Early life ==
=== 1927–1949: family and education ===
Evan Jones was born on 29 December 1927 at Hector's River, Portland Parish, Jamaica. His father, Fred M. Jones, was a wealthy planter and Custos of Portland from 1965 until his death in 1971. His mother, Gladys Jones (née Smith), was an American Quaker missionary, social worker and educator. He was one of seven children and younger brother to the politician Kenneth Jones.

Jones was named after his great-grandfather, the Reverend Evan Jones, a Welsh clergyman who came to Jamaica in 1842, building Saint Thomas Anglican Church in Manchioneal, Portland. His parents were likewise greatly involved in their community as the Jones family's land covered 10,000 acres, employing a large number of local people from villages such as Duckenfield. His mother also ran Happy Grove Secondary School in Hector's River as both secretary of the board of governors and, at another time, its acting principal. Jones's parents instilled in him an early love for poetry and theatre: his father would recite poetry as he made the rounds of their estates; and his mother wrote and delivered sermons to her congregation. She also directed pageants, in which his father often acted.

Jones grew up with his parents being public figures of great significance in the parish of Portland. In an interview given to Laura Tanna, writing for the Jamaica Journal, Jones said:

I think because my parents were both very interesting and powerful [...] they had a strong sense of purpose. [...] We were all brought up to believe we had to be somebody and do something, in a very small way like the Kennedy family in the States. [...] It was your job as a human being, because you were born into the manor, to do something with it. [...] I chose to be a writer.

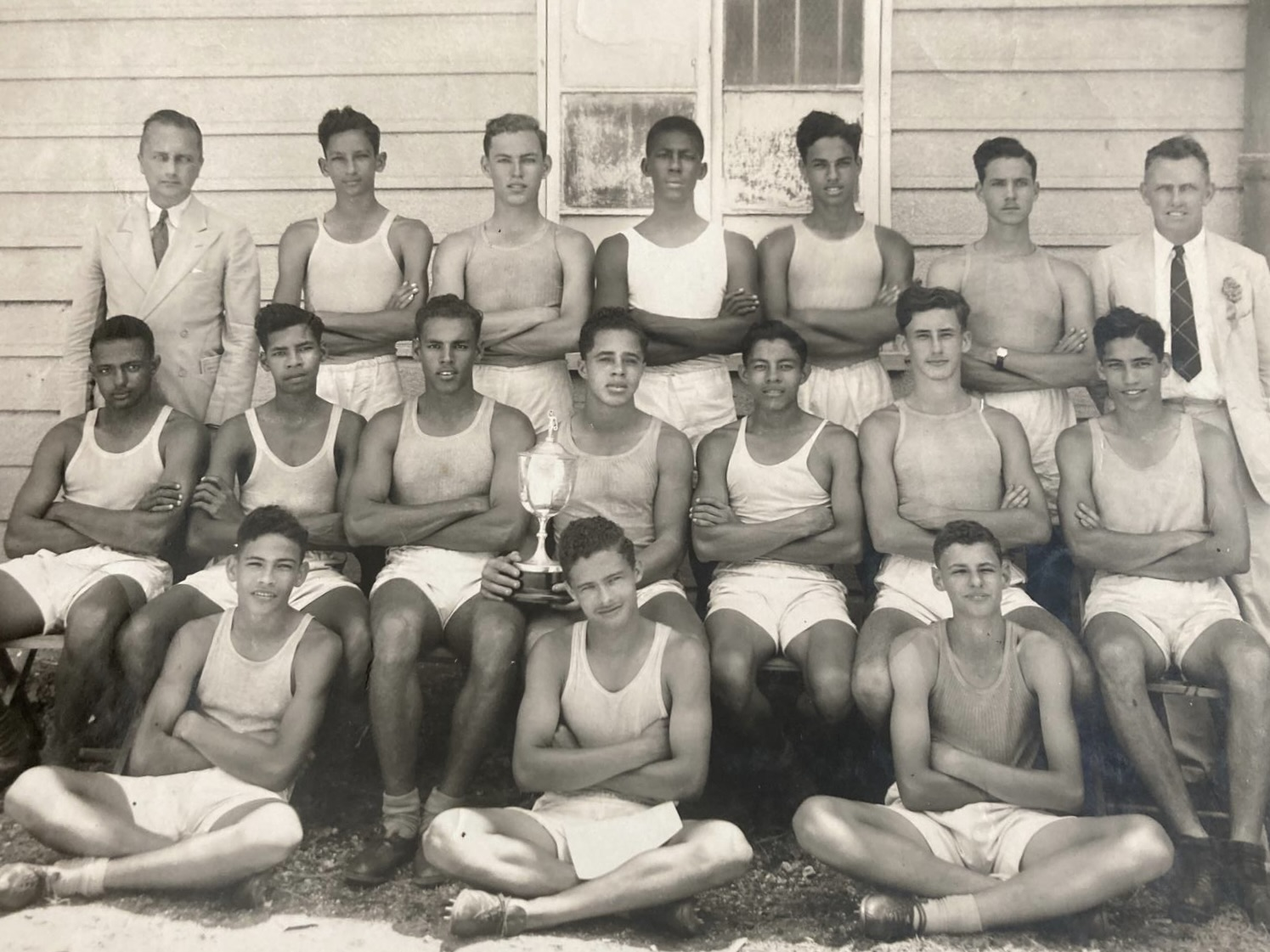
Jones (rightmost, middle row) as part of Munro College's football team (c. 1943)

Jones was raised in rural eastern Jamaica and was educated as a child by a governess. From the age of nine, he was educated at the island's prestigious boarding school Munro College. When he was 12, Jones was taught English literature there by Reg Bunting, a Cambridge graduate and later headmaster of Wolmer's School, who inspired him to become a writer. Jones was also an avid athlete and footballer, playing as a forward alongside Lindy Delapenha to win the Olivier Shield in 1943.

At 17, Jones went to the United States to attend the Quaker school Haverford College in Pennsylvania, where he majored in English and Spanish. There he found both academic and athletic success, earning the nickname "the educated toe": Jones was a varsity athlete, cricketer and captain of the football team, being named an All-American. He was also president of the Spanish Club and a member of the Founders' Club, a dining club of twelve members elected on the strength of their academic and extracurricular achievements. Jones was described in Haverford's 1949 yearbook as:

Ev . . . the deadly boot that scored fifty goals . . . woos his women with Macbeth . . . "Now take my paper on Bergson" . . . poet and songster . . . called from the cricket field to pinch hit as high jumper . . . "I loathe inconstancy" . . . authority on the Jamaican rum industry . . . hopes for a look at Oxford's spires.

Jones began writing plays while at Haverford, his first was about the White Witch of Rose Hall, a Jamaican legend and duppy story previously novelised by H. G. de Lisser. His first play to be produced, Inherit this Land (Little Theatre Movement of Jamaica, 1950), was also written at Haverford.

=== 1949: relief work in Palestine ===
After graduating from Haverford in 1949, Jones volunteered with the American Friends Service Committee (AFSC), who dispatched him to the Gaza Strip, Palestine, in the aftermath of the First Arab–Israeli War. He and two other Quaker volunteers sailed on a Dutch freighter and, once landed, travelled by bus to Cairo. They entered Gaza by train at the commencement of Eid al-Fitr. Under the auspices of the United Nations, refugee camps had been organised by the AFSC. Jones had previously provided similar relief work for the AFSC in Mexico and was therefore tasked with overseeing the distribution of food rations to the inhabitants of a camp of 30,000 refugees, natives and Bedouins at Khan Yunis.

Jones recruited a team of Arabs from the refugee population who aided him in his duties; he credited his Armenian translator as the real power behind his leadership. He also worked with an assistant, Mustafa, whose brother was a powerful Bedouin sheikh, known for his retainers' ability to smuggle themselves in and out of Gaza. Through this connexion, Jones inadvertently became involved in a blood feud when a spare tire was stolen from his Jeep while he attended one of the sheikh's several weddings. This resulted in resprisals by the sheikh's men who felt that Jones, as the sheikh's guest, had been dishonoured.

Jones and a colleague also travelled to Beirut and Damascas while on leave and, at the end of his service, he stayed for a short time in an Israeli kibbutz. His experiences became the basis of his first television play, The Widows of Jaffa (1957).

=== 1949–1952: Oxford and "The Song of the Banana Man" ===
Jones went on to attend Wadham College, Oxford, graduating in 1952 with a Bachelor of Arts degree in English Language and Literature. According to Ian Thomson, in order to reach England Jones and a friend stowed away on a banana boat bound for London. From there, he took a taxi to Oxford paid for with money won playing poker during his voyage. Jones stated that he initially "hated" and "loathed" Oxford because of the arrogance of his publicly educated peers. However, by his second year, he had become a member of a clique of Rhodes scholars and international students, two of whom were Jamaican: the future editor of The Gleaner, Hector Wynter, and Neville Dawes, who would go on to direct the Institute of Jamaica. Other members included the American mathematician Robert W. Bass and the producer Christopher Ralling, who later collaborated with Jones on The Fight Against Slavery (1975).

It was in conversation with Dawes, however, that Jones declared his intention to synthesise English and Jamaican literary traditions; the result was the seminal poem "The Song of the Banana Man", which sets Patois to English metrical verse. Written in 1952, broadcast on the BBC World Service's programme Caribbean Voices in 1953, and published in the Barbadian literary magazine Bim in 1954, the poem is frequently cited by other writers, including Lorna Goodison, former poet laureate of Jamaica, and Raymond Antrobus, whose Jamaican father had the poem on his bedroom wall. The dub poets of the 1970s, namely Linton Kwesi Johnson, Mutabaruka and Mikey Smith, also recognise the poem as a significant influence.

== Career ==
=== 1952–1959: early career with the BBC ===
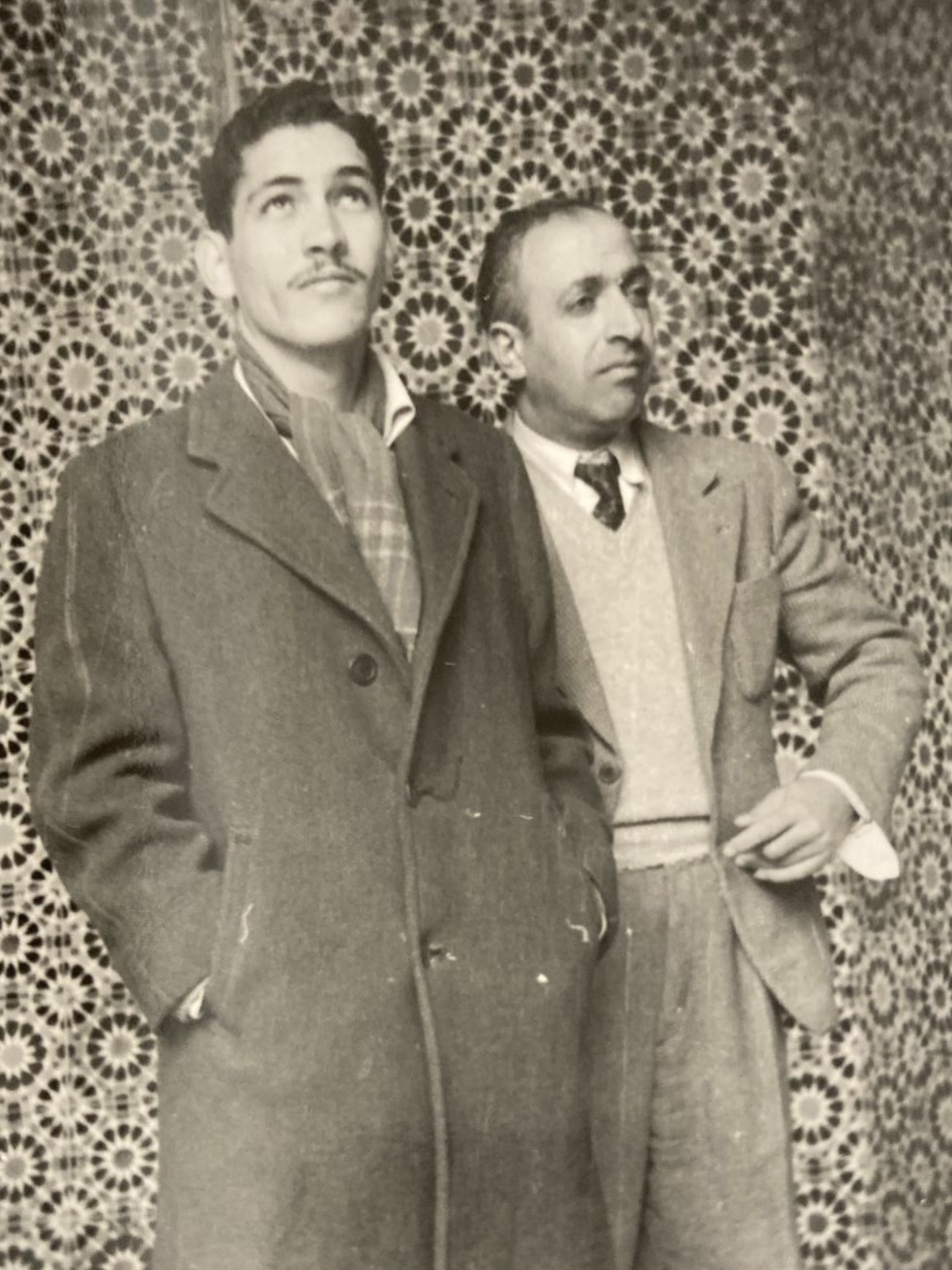
Jones (left) on the set of The Widows of Jaffa (c. 1957)

After leaving Oxford, Evan Jones was engaged to work at the Campbell Soup Company by friends in the US. Upon arriving in Philadelphia, however, he found that a policy decision which had impelled the company to hire non-white persons had been reversed and that his offer of a job had been rescinded. He then worked as the furnace man at a bubble gum factory before teaching at Quaker schools such as The Putney School, Vermont, and the George School in Pennsylvania. He also taught at Wesleyan University, Connecticut.

During this period, Jones wrote a stage adaptation of Vladimir Nabokov's 1947 novel Bend Sinister. Nabokov read and praised the dramatisation in 1955, shortly before the publication of Lolita, calling Jones "a gifted young playwright" in a letter to Edmund Wilson in which he asked Wilson to recommend people to whom he could forward the manuscript. Despite this, the adaptation ultimately went unproduced.

In 1956, Jones married his first wife, the American actress Honora Fergusson, in J. Robert Oppenheimer's garden. Jones had been a protégé of her father, the literary critic and Dante scholar Francis Fergusson, who was a close friend of Oppenheimer's. Once married, Jones moved back to England with his wife, intending to begin his literary career in earnest. Jones's father-in-law gave him introductions to T. S. Eliot, Stephen Spender and Stuart Burge. Within six months of arriving in London, Burge produced Jones's television play The Widows of Jaffa which aired live on 13 June 1957. The play starred Peter Wyngarde, Leo McKern and Harold Kasket; The Sunday Times praised it as "written with fire and insight".

Jones then wrote the television play In a Backward Country, which the BBC produced in 1959, and which also aired live. It was based directly on his family and adapted the Biblical story of David and his son Absalom, starring Dan Jackson, Pearl Prescod, and Wilfred Lawson. Jones's play follows a wealthy Jamaican landowner, resembling his father, and his politician son whom Jones likened to his brother Kenneth. The play is a political parable about the contemporary issue of land reform. After Jamaica was granted her independence from the British Empire in 1962, the call for land reform was a major factor in the incitement of the Jamaican political conflict. The evocation of his brother in Jones's play proved to be ill-omened, as Kenneth would go on to become Minister of Communications and Works in Jamaica's first independent Cabinet but died under suspicious circumstances at a retreat in 1964, many suspecting him to have been murdered.

=== 1960–1967: collaboration with Joseph Losey ===
Jones returned to Jamaica after the production of In a Backward Country to manage FMJ, his family's estates, for a period of six months between 1959 and 1960, taking up the duties of his brother Keith, Kenneth's twin brother. Evan found it difficult to work as a writer during this time and subsequently moved with his wife to New York City writing a third play for the BBC before returning to London for its production. Upon arrival, however, he discovered it had been cancelled. Through the American pianist Julius Katchen, a close friend of Jones's from his Haverford days, Jones was recommended to Joseph Losey, who had been subpoenaed by the House Un-American Activities Committee while in Europe and had chosen to ignore the summons, settling in England. Losey had previously seen In a Backward Country on television and mentioned to Katchen that he wanted to meet the writer.

Losey then found Jones outside South Kensington tube station, apparently by chance, and commissioned him to rewrite The Damned (released 1962) the same evening. He planned to begin shooting the film two weeks hence; Jones moved in with him and delivered the redrafted script in time. The Damned was a science fiction picture produced by Hammer Film, adapting H. L. Lawrence's 1960 novel Children of Light. It has subsequently been discussed with reference to Katsuhiro Otomo's anime film Akira (1988), both of which deal with nuclear anxiety, motorcycle gang culture and present posthuman children as victims of militarised science.

Losey and Jones next worked on Eva (released before The Damned, also in 1962), a project initially offered to Jean-Luc Godard. The screenplay was an adaptation of James Hadley Chase's novel Eve (1945) and took additional inspiration from Raymond Chandler. Hugo D. Butler, another blacklisted person, was initially tasked with adapting the novel. According to Colin Gardner, Losey replaced Butler with Jones as he felt Butler's vision was too rooted the aesthetics of Hollywood noir and that Jones could help him place the film within a more "discursively confessional, auteur-based cinema". Losey decided that he and Jones should retreat to Italy and then move into his friend Hardy Krüger's house in Lugano, Switzerland, to write. However, Losey at this time was still considered a persona non grata and had previously been denied entry to Italy several times. Through an associate of the gangster Albert Dimes, whom Losey had been introduced to by Stanley Baker, passage to Italy was arranged. In Lugano, Losey made sexual advances to Jones, which he declined.

Eva was described by Losey as a "baroque" film: a romance set in Venice, Italy, starring Baker and Jeanne Moreau, with an intended runtime of around 165 minutes. Jones regarded Moreau as "the finest actress" he worked with in his career but shared Losey's disappointment with the final film, which had been extensively cut on the insistence of the film's producers, the Hakim brothers, who objected to Jones's deviations from the original novel, as well as re-scored, with its original Billie Holiday soundtrack also being cut.

Jones's collaboration with Losey achieved the latter's aim to have his newer work be considered alongside that of film-makers such Godard and Michelangelo Antonioni: Jones recalled an incident in a café on the Rive Gauche, Paris, where he overheard a group of French cinephiles discussing the deeper meanings of he and Losey's films. He interjected, attempting to explain how material constraints had led to many of what they believed were tasteful artistic decisions, comments which only served to infuriated them.

In 1962, Jones and his wife divorced by mutual consent and he returned to London alone to write "The Lament of the Banana Man". The poem is a companion piece to "The Song of the Banana Man", despairing of the experience of the Windrush generation and depicting the once-proud speaker of his earlier poem as an alienated London Underground worker, unfulfilled in his relationship. The poem was similarly popular with dub poets; in 1973, Guyanese writer Marc Matthews's album Marc Matthews & Friends – Live included a performance the poem. "The Lament of the Banana Man" seemingly brought Jones back to his preoccupation with the sociopolitical dynamics of his home country. In 1962, he wrote The Spectators, which ran for a week at the Guildford Theatre in Surrey. The play was a serious treatment of the relationship between tourists and Jamaicans, a dichotomy that was the premise of his earlier poem "The Song of the Banana Man". Jones also wrote the television play Return to Look Behind for ITV, who produced it in 1963–64, about the troubled return of a Jamaican immigrant who had spent much time in England.

During this same period, Jones wrote The Madhouse on Castle Street for the BBC, who produced it in 1963: a now lost television play featuring the acting debut of Bob Dylan. The play was about a boarding house and the director, Philip Saville, hired Dylan to play the lead. Dylan found acting to be difficult, however; so Jones rewrote his script to accommodate Dylan as a musician, playing the part of the chorus. Dylan's single "Blowin' in the Wind" was first performed as part of the play.

In 1963, Jones also met his second wife, the English actress Joanna Napper (known professionally as Joanna Vogel), when they met eyes at a party; Jones almost came to blows with another man over which of them would drive her home, but prevailed. The two would later be married in Jamaica in the mid-1970s, and Joanna Jones would retire from acting. They had two children, Melissa (born 1965) and Sadie (born 1967).

Jones collaborated twice more with Losey, writing more of his films than any other single writer. Both of these final two films starred Dirk Bogarde. Their third film was King and Country (1964), a First World War anti-war drama about the military trial of a deserter. It was very well received, earning nominations for four British Academy Awards and two categories at the Venice Film Festival, winning the Volpi Cup. In 2023, a restoration of the film was also selected as a Venice Classic.

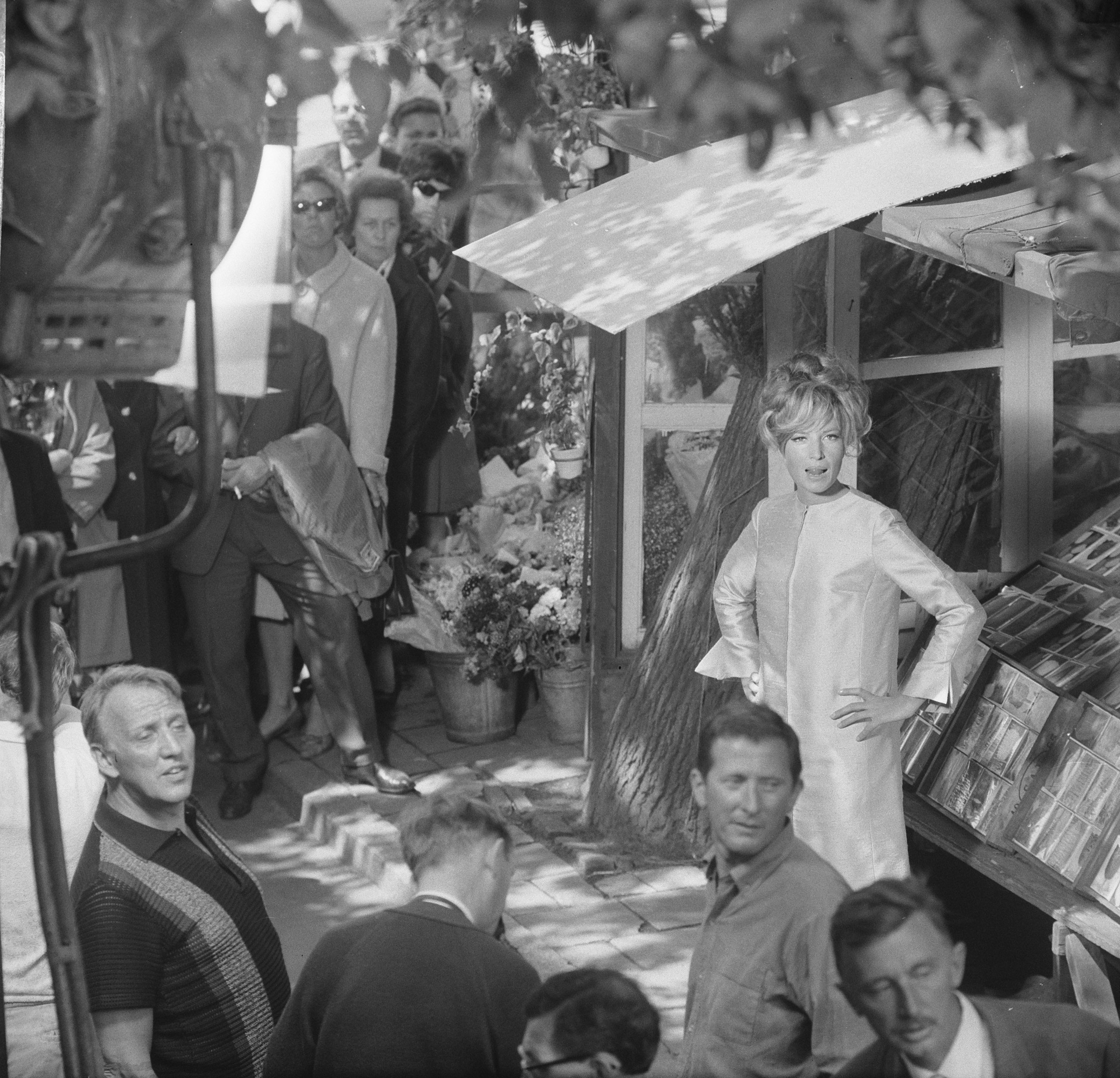
Losey (leftmost), Jones (central, cropped) and Vitti (middleground, right) during the production of Modesty Blaise in 1965.

Jones and Losey's fourth and final project together was Modesty Blaise (1966), a spy comedy based on Peter O'Donnell and Jim Holdaway's eponymous comic strip, starring Monica Vitti. Jones wrote the screenplay to be a Surrealistic parody of the James Bond films, attracting the attention of Harry Saltzman and Albert R. Broccoli. The production was fraught with Jones rewriting large portions of the script during shooting; and, although he was uncredited, Harold Pinter, another of Losey's friends and frequent collaborators, made additional contributions to the script, likely due to Jones and Losey having conflicting ideas on the project. Jones expressed his unhappiness with the final film, stating that he thought it was "dreadful" and "embarrassing", though the film achieved a cult status, going on to be a major influence on the Austin Powers film series.

Jones offered Losey his screenplay All the Angels (1968) and interested he and Elizabeth Taylor in another, White Witch of Rose Hall, an adaptation of his earlier one-act play written at Haverford, though neither came to fruition.

After the production of Modesty Blaise had ended, Saltzman and Broccoli offered Jones the task of adapting Len Deighton's 1963 espionage novel Funeral in Berlin. It was the second in a series of films where Michael Caine would play the spy Harry Palmer. The director, Guy Hamilton, planned the film meticulously, an approach that was in direct opposition to Losey's, who preferred to "make the film up as he went along" and to keep his writers—such as Jones, Pinter and Tennessee Williams—on hand while filming as he felt they "contributed genius". This was Jones's first experience writing for a more impersonal big-budget production and he was surprised to find that his role ended once filming started.

In 1967, Jones wrote the play Go Tell it on Table Mountain for the BBC's Thirty-Minute Theatre series (1965–73). The play was later performed on stage in 1970, first at The Little Theatre in Kingston produced by the Jamaican Theatre Company, with Jones waiving his rights to royalties, and then as part of the Richmond Fringe Festival, where it was the Orange Tree Theatre's inaugural production. At the Orenge Tree, the play was so popular that director Sam Walters was forced to make the impromptu decision to put on back-to-back performances on its opening night. The play is set in Rhodesia, on the verge of the state's 1965 Unilateral Declaration of Independence, and follows a group of black actors in their attempt to improvise a melodrama based on the ongoing racial turmoil. The situation is complicated by the arrival of a white actor, blurring the lines between reality and fiction.

=== 1969–1971: collaboration with Ted Kotcheff ===
Jones's next major partnership was with the Canadian director Ted Kotcheff, with whom Jones made two controversial and critically acclaimed cult classics. In 1969, Jones wrote Two Gentlemen Sharing, adapting David Stuart Leslie's 1963 novel of the same name, writing about a successful black Caribbean man and a white Englishman belonging to an impoverished gentry family. Both were educated at Oxford and are fascinated with the other's background. The film explores fetishisation, homosexuality and racial politics, receiving an X certificate due to the censors fearing it would incite race riots. The film however performed well in the US and Europe, and was lauded at the Venice Film Festival, where it was chosen as the official British entry. The British Film Institute (BFI) have since rehabilitated and re-released the film, regarding it as a lost classic and giving it an honourable mention among their selection of the "10 Great British Gay Films".

The two would then collaborate on Wake in Fright (also known as Outback), adapting Kenneth Cook's 1961 novel of the same name. Around 1963, Dirk Bogarde had optioned Cook's novel and brought it to the attention of Joseph Losey, hiring Jones directly to write the script. Sufficient funds were unable to be raised and the project was brought to Kotcheff via Morris West.

The film follows John Grant, an English schoolteacher who loses his money at two-up and becomes beholden to the residents of the outback town of Bundanyabba. It is a disturbing psychological thriller that features uncensored footage of a real Kangaroo hunt. Wake in Fright would come to be regarded as the first important work of the Australian New Wave and is generally considered the movement's finest film. The film premiered at Cannes Film Festival in 1971 and was nominated for the Palme d'Or. Until 2009, the film was thought to be lost however a negative in good condition was found in Pittsburgh and painstakingly remastered. It was re-released the same year at Cannes where it was again met with universal acclaim. It was selected as a Cannes Classic by Martin Scorsese, who championed the film, and it remains one of only two films to have ever been selected for the Festival twice.

=== 1973–1981: later work for the BBC and in Hollywood ===
In 1973, Jones was asked to rewrite Brian G. Hutton's horror film Night Watch to make the lead actress Elizabeth Taylor's part more to her liking. Jones obliged, finding Taylor's eccentricities amusing. He explained in an interview that he had written Taylor's character as murdering someone and fleeing the country. Taylor then ordered from her designer a costume to wear while murdering and another to wear while escaping, requesting that Jones rewrite the scene again to give her time to change.

Jones was then approached by an old friend from Oxford, the producer Christopher Ralling, to write an episode of a documentary drama about the transatlantic slave trade which would be jointy released by the BBC and Public Broadcasting Service (PBS) in the US. He agreed, on the condition that he was given creative control of the entire limited series—Ralling accepted. The project was called The Fight Against Slavery and would take two years to produce, it took Jones a year to research, with the aid of an assistant, and Ralling another year to film, being released in 1975. Jones also wrote, with the aid of Terence Brady, an illustrated book that served as a companion to the series, which was also published by the BBC. Jones considered the project his magnum opus, introducing each episode of the series in person. The project was groundbreaking as a more nuanced history of the slave trade, with the academic Martin Stollery suggesting it may have been the first piece of British television to depict Olaudah Equiano since his literary rediscovery in the 1960s.

Despite being awarded the Martin Luther King Memorial Prize in 1976, The Fight Against Slavery was somewhat overshadowed by the popularity of Alex Haley's novel Roots (1976) and its television adaptation, which American audiences found more entertaining. However, Jones's series has since been re-evaluated by critics and academics who have recognised it as the more "cerebral" and "erudite" offering, anticipating Haley's later melodrama.

Around 1975, Jones was invited to write a biographical film about Muhammad Ali, living for a week in Ali's home and accompanying him to Watts, Los Angeles, to speak motivationally at the ghetto's schools. Although a script was completed, there was a failure to raise sufficient funds and the project was halted.

Jones then wrote The Man with the Power for the BBC's Playhouse in 1977, a television play about a black immigrant labourer, Boysie Fuller, who experiences an awakening of latent psychic powers; and, in 1981, the first episode of The Racing Game, a horse racing crime series adapted from Dick Francis's novels. Between 1979 and 1980, he also wrote Kangaroo, released in 1986, adapting D. H. Lawrence's eponymous novel from 1923.

Jones's next film was his only major foray into Hollywood, a part of the industry he had chosen to avoid so as to live and work in London. Jones wrote the script for John Huston's Escape to Victory (1981), starring Caine, Max von Sydow, Sylvester Stallone and the Brazilian footballer Pelé. The film was a sports drama set in a prisoner of war camp during the Second World War. Jones had been attached to the project through his connection to Hutton who was originally intended to direct the film. The Polish writer Yabo Yablonsky had previously written a version of the script, though Jones rewrote it completely once he took over the project.

=== 1983–2006: later career and novels ===
After almost 30 years of working as a screenwriter, Jones embarked upon a passion project of his: a biographical picture on the jockey Bob Champion that charted his recovery from cancer to his win at the Grand National. The film was named Champions (1983) and starred John Hurt and Edward Woodward. Jones felt attracted to the Champion's story as his mother, Gladys, and his elder brother, Keith, had both died of cancer in previous years. Jones also had a love of horses, which he bred on the FMJ Estates and trained for Caymanas Park. The film in was originally was 135 minutes long and Jones regarded it as "the most wonderful thing [he]'d ever seen". However, like Eva, it was cut down by half an hour.

In the mid-1980s, feeling that he was missing out on the writing of prose, Jones began to write his semi-autobiographical novel, Stone Haven, first published by the Institute of Jamaica in 1993. The novel revolves around the Newtons, a fictionalised version of his own family. The Gleaner reported that Hector Wynter, in his speech at the book launch, said:

[T]he novel which recounts the story of an affluent Portland family "contributes the novelesque and the historian with strong and beautiful descriptions of Hector's River and Manchioneal. Evan uses history constructively, and gives us an excellent insight into rural life, particularly in Portland, and the mixture of races".

Stone Haven has come to be regarded as "a classic of modern West Indian literature"; and has been recommended by the writers Ishion Hutchinson and Ian Thomson as an aid to understanding Jamaican history. As a historical novel with its basis in memoir, it has also been used as an important academic source. The novel, with relation to upper-class Jamaican society, was interpreted alongside the works of other Jamaican writers, such as H. G. de Lisser and Anthony C. Winkler, in Kim Robinson-Walcott's text Out of Order! (2006), although Jones criticised the study as being overly preoccupied with race, ignoring the human condition as a whole. Also in 2006, the novel was used by the architect Brian J. Hudson to interrogate the social function of the veranda in Jamaican culture. The same year, Jones was honoured at the Doctor Bird Awards, receiving an award for a lifetime of achievement in film.

During the writing of Stone Haven, Jones also worked on other projects. He returned to the subject of Australia, writing an unproduced screenplay about the 1629 wreck of Batavia, a Dutch East Indian flagship. Jones became an expert on her history, identifying her wreck as the first events of Australian history. He also worked as a screenwriter on Jacques Dorfmann and Pierre Magny's film Shadow of the Wolf (1992), starring Toshiro Mifune and Donald Sutherland.

Jones's second novel, Alonso and the Drug Baron (2006), is a crime novel influenced by blaxploitation and the Afro-Caribbean folk mythology figure of Anansi. The story centres on the titular character's struggle to exonerate himself after he is framed for murder by a corrupt police detective. In 2008, the novel was longlisted for the International Dublin Literary Award, nominated by Trinidad and Tobago's National Library.

== Other activities ==
=== Caribbean Artists Movement ===
Jones was a founding member of the influential Caribbean Artists Movement (CAM), attending its first meeting in 1966. In 1973, he contributed a poem to the movement's journal, Savacou, a special issue dedicated to Frank Collymore.

=== Third World ===
In 1977, Jones wrote to the BBC and secured permission for Third World's song "1865", from the album 96° in the Shade, to be broadcast.

=== The Gleaner ===
In the mid to late 1970s, Jones maintained two columns in The Gleaner: a shorter, more regular column titled "Home Thoughts" as well as longer, less frequent pieces published under "Week-end Reflections". Both were often political commentaries, for example lampooning socialism; decrying political violence, such as the attack on John Hearne at a People's National Party (PNP) rally in 1977; criticising Fidel Castro; or suggesting what China's westernisation signalled for Jamaica's economy. At other times, however, they would be parables in the form of anecdotes drawn from his own career, or commentaries on the horse racing or football. One such piece was written in praise of Viv Anderson, the first black footballer to play for England. Jones also contributed a poem titled "Can You Remember?" to The Gleaner in 1978.

== Personal life ==
Although Jamaican, Jones was also a member of the Australian Writers' Guild. He also belonged to the Stage Golfing Society where he would often play against his friend Sean Connery. Other friends of his included the Irish screenwriter Brian Phelan and the English producer Michael Whitehall.

Jones was a collector of the work of Dame Elisabeth Frink. He and Losey had conceived of the character of Fraya, a sculptor played by Viveca Lindfors, for their film The Damned so that they could include Frink's work in the mise-en-scène.

As a child, Jones owned a dog called Captain Blood, named after Michael Curtiz's 1935 film of the same name. He was also a keen equestrian, owning horses named Baccari, Quantro and Special Branch, as well as shares in race horses.

=== Death ===
Evan Jones died on 18 April 2023, at the age of 95. He is survived by his second wife, Joanna, and their daughters, Melissa and Sadie, who are both novelists. He has four grandchildren, two by Sadie Jones and the Hon. Tim Boyd; and two by Melissa Jones and Neil Spiller.

On 12 October 2025, Jones was posthumously inducted into the Munro College Old Boys' Association Hall of Fame at a ceremony held at the Pegasus Hotel. During his speech on Jones's life and achievements, Jamaica Observer journalist Lance Neita proposed the Association's board recommend to the government that they award Jones the Order of Distinction, Commander Class, if not a higher honour. The ceremony was concluded by a reading of Jones's poem "The Song of the Banana Man" by his nephew, Nicholas Jones.

=== Archive ===
In 2014, the University of Oxford's Bodleian Library acquired a collection of documents from Jones's life, including drafts of scripts. In 2024–25, drafts of his poem "The Song of the Banana Man" were displayed by the Bodleian as part of their Write Cut Rewrite exhibition curated by professors Dirk Van Hulle and Mark Nixon.

== Bibliography ==
=== Books ===
Year	Title	Publisher	ISBN	Pages	Notes
1958	Protector of the Indians: A Life of Bartolomé de Las Casas	Thomas Nelson	—N/a	154	Biography; illustrated by George Fulton.
1975	The Fight Against Slavery	BBC Books	9780563128687	144	Companion to the BBC television series of the same name; co-authored with Terence Brady. Second edition published by W. W. Norton & Co. in 1977.
1978	Year 1	Longman International Education	9780582750432	96	Texbook; co-authored with Leila Keane. Part of the series Junior language Arts for the Caribbean.
1978	Year 2	Longman International Education	9780582750494	96	Texbook; co-authored with Leila Keane. Part of the series Junior language Arts for the Caribbean.
1981	Year 3	Longman International Education	9780582750456	128	Texbook; co-authored with Leila Keane. Part of the series Junior language Arts for the Caribbean.
1984	Anansi Stories	Ginn & Co.	1556240147	48	Folklore anthology; illustrated by various artists. Part of the series Tales of the Caribbean.
1984	Stories from History	Ginn & Co.	1556240147	48	Folklore anthology; illustrated by various artists. Part of the series Tales of the Caribbean.
1984	The Beginning of Things	Ginn & Co.	1556240147	48	Folklore anthology; illustrated by various artists. Part of the series Tales of the Caribbean.
1984	Witches and Duppies	Ginn & Co.	1556240147	48	Folklore anthology; illustrated by various artists. Part of the series Tales of the Caribbean.
1993	Stone Haven	Institute of Jamaica Publications	9789768017215	409	Novel, roman à clef. Abridged edition published by Heinemann as part of their Caribbean Writers Series in 1998.
1994	Skylarking	Longman Caribbean	9780582219656	122	Children's fiction. Part of the series Horizons. Published in French as Aventures sur la planéte Knos in 1998.
2006	Alonso and the Drug Baron	Macmillan Caribbean	9781405031752	208	Nominated for the International Dublin Literary Award.

=== Poetry and memoir ===
- Tropic Rain (1946)
- "Black boy, naked on jutting bough..." (1948)
- June Eleventh (1949)
- "How far is it to Bethlehem..." (1950)
- "There is a country spot..." (1952)
- "Press your fingers on your face..." (1952)
- The Song of the Banana Man (1952)
- Memories of Oxford (1953)
- The Poet (1954)
- Walking with R.F. (1955)
- Firenze (1955)
- "In a town of shopping centers..." (1955)
- Six a.m. Nov. 7 (1956)
- Epithalamion, with Suntan Cream (1960)
- The Lament of the Banana Man (1962)
- "Man sitting still..." (1972)
- Grandpa Spider (1977)
- Can you Remember? (1978)
- The Duppies (1984)
- A Cushion for my Dreams (1999)
- A Birthday (n.d.)
- The Communist interprets American Policy (n.d.)
- Drowned Girl (n.d.)
- For Jason and Gabriella (n.d.)
- Genesis (n.d.)
- "Good God, the dogwood is in bloom..." (n.d.)
- The Jamaican Husband (n.d.)
- "Kindled between the clashings..." (n.d.)
- "The Lament..." (n.d.)
- "Listen, you listen to me..." (n.d.)
- "Look at it this way..." (n.d.)
- Monday morning (n.d.)
- November, 1956 (n.d.)
- "Of silence..." (n.d.)
- Poem (n.d.)
- A Prayer (n.d.)
- "Quick..." (n.d.)
- Ramblers (n.d.)
- The Season of Planting, Evening (n.d.)
- The Talent (n.d.)
- The Tears of Troy/We were westward bound (n.d.)
- "There's a clump of violets..." (n.d.)
- "These are child's hands..." (n.d.)
- Songs of Exile (n.d.)

=== Theatre ===
- Inherit this Land (Little Theatre Movement of Jamaica, 1951)
- A Figure of Speech (Jamaica, 1950s)
- In a Backward Country (The Theatre Guild of Guyana, 1959)
- Go Tell it on Table Mountain (Jamaican Theatre Company; Richmond Fringe Festival, 1970)
- The Spectators (Guyana, 1972)

=== Screenplays ===
Year	Title	Director	Notes
1962	The Damned	Joseph Losey	
1962	Eva	Joseph Losey	Shared credit with Hugo Butler.
1964	King and Country	Joseph Losey	
1966	Modesty Blaise	Joseph Losey	
1966	Funeral in Berlin	Guy Hamilton	
1969	Two Gentlemen Sharing	Ted Kotcheff	
1971	Wake in Fright	Ted Kotcheff	
1973	Ghost in the Noonday Sun	Peter Medak	
1973	Night Watch	Brian G. Hutton	Additional dialogue only.
1981	Escape to Victory	John Huston	Shared credit with Yabo Yablonsky.
1981	The Killing of Angel Street	Donald Crombie	Shared credit with Michael Craig and Cecil Holmes.
1984	Champions	John Irvin	
1986	Kangaroo	Tim Burstall	
1990	A Show of Force	Bruno Barreto	Shared credit with John Strong.
1992	Shadow of the Wolf	Jacques Dorfmann; Pierre Magny	

=== Television scripts ===
Year	Programme	Episode	Network	Notes
1957	The Widows of Jaffa	—N/a	BBC	
1958	Television Playwright	"In a Backward Country"	BBC	
1963	Jezebel ex UK	"Return to Look Behind"	ITV	
1963	Sunday-Night Play	"Madhouse on Castle Street"	BBC	
1965	Armchair Theatre	"Old Man's Fancy"	ABC	
1965	Thirty-Minute Theatre	"Go Tell It on Table Mountain"	BBC	
1967	Away from It All	"A Work of Genius"	BBC	
1975	The Fight Against Slavery	—N/a	BBC	Six-episode limited series.
1976	BBC2 Playhouse	"The Mind Beyond: The Man with the Power"	BBC	
1977	Centre Play	"Rehearsal"	BBC	
1979	The Dick Francis Thriller: The Racing Game	"Gambling Lady"	YTV	
1990	Chillers	"A Curious Suicide"	FR3	

== Criticism and further reading ==
- Burnett, Paula, ed. (1986). "Evan Jones". The Penguin Book of Caribbean Verse in English. London: Penguin Books. pp. 220–225. ISBN 0140424601.
- Figueroa, John (1978). "Derek Walcott's 'Poopa, Da' Was a Fête' and Evan Jones's 'Lament of the Banana Man'". In Baugh, Edward (ed.). Critics on Caribbean Literature. New York: St. Martin's Press. pp. 149–152. ISBN 0312176058.
