= Shadow of the Wolf =

- Directed by: Jacques Dorfmann; Pierre Magny
- Written by: Jacques Dorfmann; Evan Jones; David Milhaud; Rudy Wurlitzer
- Produced by: Dieter Geissler; Brad M. Gilbert; Michael Spielberg
- Starring: Lou Diamond Phillips; Toshiro Mifune; Jennifer Tilly; Bernard-Pierre Donnadieu; Donald Sutherland
- Cinematography: Billy Williams
- Music by: Maurice Jarre
- Production companies: Canal+ Eiffel Productions
- Distributed by: Triumph Releasing Corporation (United States); Acteurs Auteurs Associés (France)
- Release dates: November 12, 1992 (Germany); March 5, 1993 (United States)
- Running time: 112 minutes
- Countries: Canada; France
- Language: English
- Box office: $1.4 million

Shadow of the Wolf (French title: Agaguk) is a 1992 Canadian-French adventure film directed by Jacques Dorfmann and Pierre Magny and starring Lou Diamond Phillips, Toshiro Mifune, Jennifer Tilly and Donald Sutherland. It is based on the novel Agaguk by Yves Thériault.

== Plot ==
Agaguk has become isolated from his fellow Inuit after he was disowned by his father, the angakkuq (shaman), Kroomak, for challenging the latter's chosen wife. Brown, a white man, comes to do business in the territory. Agaguk is forced to go on the run after a dramatic altercation with Brown and flee from the pursuing police, impacting the stability of his community.

== Cast ==
- Lou Diamond Phillips as Agaguk
- Toshiro Mifune as Kroomak
- Jennifer Tilly as Igiyook
- Bernard-Pierre Donnadieu as Brown
- Donald Sutherland as Henderson
- Nicholas Campbell as Scott
- Raoul Trujillo as "Big Tooth"
- Qalingo Tookalak as Tulugak
- Jobie Arnaituk as Nayalik
- Tamussie Sivuarapik as Korok
- Harry Hill as Mr. Tavish

== Production ==
Principal photography for the film took place at Montreal, Quebec, Canada.
