= Golden Grove, Jamaica =

Human settlement in Jamaica

Coordinates: 17.933°N 76.270°W

Location of Golden Grove in Jamaica

Golden Grove is a settlement in the parish of Saint Thomas, southeastern Jamaica. Historically a sugar plantation, it had a population of 3,057 in 2009.

== History ==
It was established in 1734 as a sugar estate by Attorney General of Jamaica Andrew Arcedeckne, and was subsequently run by his son Chaloner Arcedeckne. In 1775, John Kelly (the supervisor of the plantation) recorded a total yield of 740 hogshead of sugar, more than double that of 1769 (350). However, estate owner Simon Taylor expressly disagreed with Kelly's overworking of the slaves on the plantation, arguing that they would be "killed by overwork and harassed to Death".

A chalice inscribed with the line "Purchased by the slaves of the Golden Grove" was created in 1830 for church-going slaves in Golden Grove to receive the Eucharist; it is now housed in the Golden Grove Church by the Diocese of Jamaica and the Cayman Islands.

The Golden Grove Sugar Factory, established in 1924, was the only sugar-manufacturing plant in eastern Jamaica until its closure in July 2019.

== Geography ==
Golden Grove is 10 kilometres (6.2 mi) northeast of Port Morant and 11 kilometres (6.8 mi) east of Bath. The banana-handling port, Port Morant, is located in Bowden, Golden Grove. A path starting from Golden Grove leads to the 100 foot (30 m)-tall Morant Point lighthouse cast in London, England in 1841. According to a 2009 census, Golden Grove had a population of 3,057.

== Reception ==
A 2000 travel guide described Golden Grove as "rather shabby", adding that tourists "won't want to stop here".

== In popular culture ==
In the second line of Evan Jones's 1952 poem "The Song of the Banana Man", "Golden Grove market place" is mentioned.
