= Clarine =

Clarine is a feminine given name. Notable people with the name include:

- Clarine Harp (born 1978), American voice actress
- Clarine Nardi Riddle (born 1949), American lawyer
- Clarine Seymour (1898–1920), American actress
- Clarine Stephenson, Jamaican novelist and poet
