= The Case of Private Hamp =

1962 television film directed by Colin Dean

- Based on: Return to the Wood by James Lansdale Hodson
- Directed by: Colin Dean
- Country of origin: Australia
- Original language: English

Production
- Running time: 55 mins
- Production company: ABC

Original release
- Network: ABC
- Release: 17 October 1962 (Sydney)
- Release: 28 November 1962 (Melbourne)
- Release: 1 January 1963 (Brisbane)

The Case of Private Hamp is a 1962 Australian television film which aired on the ABC. Despite the wiping of the era, a copy of the presentation exists as a kinescope recording.

It was based on a 1955 novel by James Lansdale Hodson which was turned into the 1964 film King and Country. The novel had been adapted for radio in Melbourne in 1957.

== Plot ==
The court martial of Private Arthur Hamp who was accused of desertion in Passchendaele, France, 1917. He is defended by Hargreaves.

== Cast ==
- Edward Hepple as Private Hamp
- John Llewellyn as Lt Webb
- Ric Hutton as Captain Hargreaves
- John Armstrong as Cpl Haslem
- Donald Philps as Col Eckersley
- Rhod Walker as court martial president
- Richard Howe as Lt Midgeley
- James Scullin as Cpl Barnes
- Richard Parry as Captain O'Sullivan
- Ron Haddrick as padre
- John O'Sullivan as Johnson
- Don Pascoe as sergeant major

== Production ==
Designer Jack Montgomery created trenches by mixing bran with black earth. The cast was all male. Ric Hutton had just appeared in a TV production of Madam Butterfly.

Hepple called it "a marvelous play about what I consider to be legalised murder. It should bring tears to the eyes of anyone who watches it."

== Reception ==
The TV critic for the Sydney Morning Herald said it featured "capable acting"

The Sunday Sydney Morning Herald critic called it "a first rate piece of drama, with a case and a quality of acting that was well-nigh flawless."

The Woman's Weekly called it "one of the strongest and most moving plays yet presented on TV."

== See also ==
- List of television plays broadcast on Australian Broadcasting Corporation (1960s)
