= Jacques Dorfmann =

French film producer (1945–2025)

Jacques Dorfmann (2 December 1945 – 27 August 2025) was a French film producer, screenwriter and director.

== Life and career ==
Dorfmann was born in Toulouse on 2 December 1945. After producing two films by Jean-Pierre Melville (Army of Shadows in 1969, and The Red Circle in 1970), he began a collaboration with Jean-Pierre Mocky in 1971, for the film The Albatross, co-produced with his brother Frédéric Dorfmann; then, in 1978, The Witness, and finally in 1982, Is there a Frenchman in the room?.

In 1981, he had a worldwide success, producing La Guerre du feu, directed by Jean-Jacques Annaud.

In 1987 he directed his first film, The Palanquin of Tears, a Franco-Chinese co-production with Tu Huai Qing and Jiang Wen, adapting the autobiographical story of pianist Chow Ching Lie. In 1992, he directed Agaguk, an adaptation of Yves Thériault's novel shot in Canada's far north with Toshiro Mifune and Donald Sutherland.

In 2001, Dorfmann produced, wrote and directed Vercingetorix: The Legend of the Druid, one of the few films dealing with the life of the Gallic leader.

Dorfmann died on 27 August 2025, at the age of 79.

== Selected filmography ==
=== Films as Director ===
- 1992: Shadow of the Wolf
- 2001: Druids

=== Films as Producer ===
- 1964: Patate
- 1969: Army of Shadows
- 1973: Shock Treatment
- 1974: Juliette and Juliette
- 1978: The Witness
- 1990: Bethune: The Making of a Hero
