= Madhouse on Castle Street =

British television film

- Left to right: Bob Dylan, Maureen Pryor, James Mellor, Ursula Howells – publicity still from the BBC
- Genre: Television play
- Written by: Evan Jones
- Directed by: Philip Saville
- Starring: David Warner; Bob Dylan; Maureen Pryor; Ursula Howells; Reg Lye; James Mellor; Georgina Ward; Ian Dallas
- Theme music composer: Bob Dylan
- Country of origin: United Kingdom

Production
- Running time: 60 minutes

Original release
- Network: BBC Television
- Release: 13 January 1963

Madhouse on Castle Street is a lost British television play, broadcast by BBC Television on the evening of 13 January 1963, as part of the Sunday Night Play strand. It was written by Evan Jones and directed by Philip Saville. The production featured the young American folk music singer Bob Dylan, who soon became a major musical star.

The play was made with electronic video cameras, although recorded onto film rather than tape. The only known copy of the play was junked in 1968, as was the standard practice of the time, despite the fact that Dylan and lead actor David Warner were by then famous. Although extensive searches have been made by the BBC, only partial audio recordings of four songs sung by Dylan survive.

== Plot ==
The play is set in an English boarding house. One of the lodgers locks himself in his room, leaving a note stating that he has decided to retire from the world until the world has changed. Other lodgers and his sister try to coax him out and establish what the problem is. The action is punctuated by songs performed by Bob Dylan.

== Production ==
Madhouse on Castle Street was commissioned as part of the Sunday Night Play strand which had been running on BBC Television since 1960. The play was written by Evan Jones, who would go on to write the screenplays for films such as Modesty Blaise and Funeral in Berlin, and directed by Philip Saville. Saville had seen Bob Dylan performing in New York City in 1962, and in December that year he contracted Dylan to come to London for three weeks to star in Madhouse on Castle Street, in spite of Dylan's complete lack of acting training or experience. This was the performer's first trip outside of North America. Dylan was originally supposed to have played the leading role in the play, but during rehearsals it became apparent that he lacked the ability to learn lines – stating that he would rather "express himself in song" – was lax in his time keeping, and would often wander off to smoke cannabis.

Saville was still keen to include Dylan, so – together with Jones – re-structured the play to create two characters out of the original one that Dylan had been hired to perform. Actor David Warner was hired to play the main acting role of Lennie, while Dylan performed songs commenting on the action in the manner of a Greek chorus as the new character Bobby, essentially playing himself. At the conclusion of the play, Dylan performed "Blowin' in the Wind", one of the first major public performances of the song. The play was planned to be recorded in one session on 30 December 1962, but it overran and the Technical Operating Manager told cast and crew to go home, even though they were willing to complete the filming. London was in the grip of a major blizzard and it was not possible to arrange a further session until 4 January 1963, when the play was completed, and it was transmitted on 13 January 1963.

== Cast information ==
- David Warner as Lennie
- Bob Dylan as Bobby
- Maureen Pryor as Mrs Griggs
- Ursula Howells as Martha Tompkins
- Reg Lye as Walter Tompkins
- James Mellor as Bernard
- Georgina Ward as Susan Taylor
- Ian Dallas as Reverend Spooner

== Songs ==
"Blowin' in the Wind" was used in the opening and closing credits, replacing a song written by Evan Jones, "Cut Me Down, My Love". Dylan also performed "Hang Me, O Hang Me", "Cuckoo Bird", and "Ballad of the Gliding Swan". Philip Saville had heard Dylan singing "Blowin' in the Wind" to two Spanish au pairs, early one morning while the singer was staying in his house. "Hang Me, O Hang Me" and "Cuckoo Bird" were traditional folk songs but Dylan altered the words. Jones provided the original lyrics for "Ballad of the Gliding Swan", which Dylan rewrote in performance.

== Reception ==
The play was described by The Times as a "strange free-wheeling piece about a man who has said goodbye to the world and simply shut himself up in his room." The reviewer added: "It is a strange unpredictable world Mr. Jones conjures up and Mr. Saville, with the aid of an excellent cast (Miss Maureen Pryor and Miss Ursula Howells were particularly good) and some haunting songs by Mr. Bob Dylan, brought it powerfully to life." The Observer, in 2005, reports that the play "got stinking reviews" according to folk singer Martin Carthy, adding that the Western Daily Mail reviewer was "baffled" and The Listener had "noted that Dylan had 'sat around playing and singing attractively, if a little incomprehensibly'".

== Junking ==
As was the usual method of BBC television drama production at the time, the play was produced in a multi-camera electronic studio on video cameras, although it was recorded as a 35 mm film telerecording rather than on videotape. This 35mm master was released for junking in 1968, and no copy of the play is known to exist.

Still photographs and scripts for the production survive, as do some amateur off-air reel-to-reel audio tape recordings of four of Dylan's songs. In 2005 the BBC launched a search for a video recording of the play, uncovering some audio recordings of the songs, but it seems that a full off-air audio copy does not exist. In April 2007, BBC Four broadcast a documentary about the making of the play in the Arena strand, featuring interviews with Saville, Jones, Martin Carthy, Peggy Seeger, Dylan collector Ian Woodward, and the first re-broadcast of the songs from the play. In November 2008, BBC Radio 2 broadcast a documentary, narrated by Bob Harris, about Dylan's visit to London and the making of the play.
