= Chow Ching Lie =

Chinese-French writer and pianist (1936–2025)

- 周勤丽
- Born: 26 August 1936
- Died: 17 February 2025
- Occupation(s): Writer, Classical pianist

Chow Ching Lie (Chinese: 周勤丽; pinyin: Zhōu Qínlì; 26 August 1936 – 17 February 2025) was a Chinese-French writer and a classical pianist. The French film Le Palanquin des Larmes, based on her biography written by Georges Walter (translated into English as Journey in Tears) describes her early life as the child of a wealthy family, the difficulties she suffered after her arranged marriage at age 13, and her ultimate success as a musician.

Chow died on 17 February 2025, aged 88.

== Bibliography ==
- Le Palanquin des larmes by Georges Walter (Journey in Tears) (biography, 1975)
- Concerto du fleuve Jaune (Yellow River Concert) (1979)
- Dans la main de Bouddha (In Buddha's Hands) (2001)
- Il n'y a pas d'impasse sous le ciel (There Is No Deadlock under Sky) (2004)

« Dans ce livre, j'ai voulu offrir à tous les secrets de ma vie. Chaque passage de mon existence est illustré par la maxime bouddhiste qui m'a permis de rebondir et de transformer une situation difficile en un événement positif. Les lecteurs pourront ainsi puiser mille et un conseils qui les aideront en toutes situations »

« In this book, I wanted to share the secrets of my life with everybody. Every passage of my life is exemplified by the Buddhist aphorism which has allowed me to bounce back and transform a difficult situation into a positive event. Readers can also draw a thousand and one pieces of advice that will help them in all situations »

== Films from Chow Ching Lie works ==
Year	English Title	Original Title	Director	
1988	Palanquin of Tears	Le Palanquin des larmes	Jacques Dorfmann	Adaptation of the novel Le Palanquin des larmes

== Documentary about Chow Ching Lie life&works ==
Year	English Title	Director	
2022	The Girl From Yellow River	Barbara Ecek	Doc & Roll films production
