= King and Country =

1964 anti-war film directed by Joseph Losey

- Theatrical release poster
- Directed by: Joseph Losey
- Screenplay by: Evan Jones
- Based on: Hamp (1964 play) by John Wilson; Return to the Wood (1955 novel) by James Lansdale Hodson
- Produced by: Joseph Losey; Norman Priggen
- Starring: Dirk Bogarde; Tom Courtenay; Leo McKern; Barry Foster
- Cinematography: Denys Coop
- Edited by: Reginald Mills
- Music by: Larry Adler
- Production company: B.H.E. Productions Ltd.
- Distributed by: Warner-Pathé (UK)
- Release dates: 5 September 1964 (Venice); 3 December 1964 (UK)
- Running time: 88 minutes
- Country: United Kingdom
- Language: English
- Budget: £85,785
- Box office: £117,358

King and Country is a 1964 British anti-war film directed and produced by Joseph Losey, and starring Dirk Bogarde, Tom Courtenay and Leo McKern. It was adapted by Evan Jones from John Wilson's 1964 stage play Hamp, in turn based on a segment of the James Lansdale Hodson's 1955 autobiographical novel Return to the Wood. Set during on the Western Front during the First World War, it centres on the court martial of an army private (Courtenay) accused of desertion.

At the 25th Venice International Film Festival, the film was nominated for the Golden Lion, while Courtenay won the Volpi Cup for Best Actor. The film was released in the United Kingdom on 3 December 1964, to positive reviews. It was nominated for four BAFTA Awards, including Outstanding British Film and Best British Actor for Courtenay.

== Plot ==
During the First World War in 1917, in the British trenches at Passchendaele, Private Arthur Hamp is accused of desertion. He is to be defended at his trial by Captain Hargreaves. Hamp had been a volunteer at the outbreak of the war and was the sole survivor of his company, but then decided to "go for a walk"; he had contemplated walking to his home in London but after more than 24 hours on the road, he is picked up by the Military Police and sent back to his unit to face court-martial for desertion.

Hargreaves is initially impatient with the simple-minded Hamp, but comes to identify with his plight. Following testimony from an unsympathetic doctor (whose solution to all ailments is to prescribe laxatives), Hargreaves is unable to persuade the court to consider the possibility that Hamp may have been suffering from shell shock. He is found guilty, but the court's recommendation for mercy is overruled by higher command, who wish to make an example of Hamp to bolster morale in his division. He is shot by firing squad, but as he is not killed outright Hargreaves has to finish him off with a revolver. His family are informed that he has been killed in action.

== Cast ==
- Dirk Bogarde as Captain Charles Hargreaves
- Tom Courtenay as Pvt. Arthur Hamp
- Leo McKern as Captain O'Sullivan
- Barry Foster as Lt. Jack Webb
- Peter Copley as Colonel
- James Villiers as Captain Midgley, Prosecuting Officer
- Jeremy Spenser as Pvt. Sparrow
- Barry Justice as 2nd Lt. Prescott, Legal Officer
- Vivian Matalon as Padre
- Keith Buckley as Corporal of the Guard
- Larry Taylor as Regimental Sergeant Major
- Derek Partridge as Captain Cartwright, Court Martial
- Brian Tipping as Lieutenant Morris, Court Martial

== Production ==
=== Background ===
King and Country is based on an actual incident during World War I written by James Lansdale Hodson, a defence attorney in the court-martial of army deserter Private Arthur Hemp.

The novel had been filmed for Australian TV in 1962 as The Case of Private Hamp, starring Edward Hepple and Ric Hutton.

=== Filming ===
Filming took place over 18 days at Shepperton Studios, between May and June 1964. The opening sequence was shot at the Royal Artillery Memorial in Hyde Park.

This was the third of five collaborations between Dirk Bogarde and Joseph Losey.

== Themes ==
The film is set during a global conflict in which 750,000 British soldiers alone perished. Tens-of-thousands of allegations against military personnel for misbehavior were issued, 3,000 of which ended in sentences of death; of these, over 300 were carried out.

A personal drama in which no combat appears, King and Country is an examination of how injustice is rationalized by a class-conscious officer corps and acted upon in the interests of military discipline and morale.

The thematic climax of the film occurs when the officer who defended the soldier administers the coup de grâce when the demoralized members of the firing squad fail to kill the deserter. Joseph Losey, in an interview with Michel Ciment remarked:

The picture is the personal relationship between that officer and that poor private deserter…So when that pistol, that coup-de-grace, has to be fired at the end, in a sense that officer is ending his own life as well as the boy’s.

Film historians James Palmer and Michael Riley note that King and Country “indicts in the most forceful terms the false values that betrayed both men…”

== Release and reception ==
The New York Times called it "an impressive achievement," noting "As usual, Mr. Losey has drawn the best from his actors," and concluding that "Some of its scenes are so strong they shock. Those who can take it will find it a shattering experience."

The film was re-released by American International Pictures (AIP) in 1966 and developed a cult following. However in 1973, Losey said that records had the film recording a loss.

Dirk Bogarde considered this film to be his personal favorite that he worked on.

=== Awards and nominations ===
Ceremony	Category	Nominee	Result	Ref.
25th Venice International Film Festival	Golden Lion	Joseph Losey	Nominated	
25th Venice International Film Festival	Best Actor	Tom Courtenay	Won	
18th British Academy Film Awards	Outstanding British Film	—N/a	Nominated	
18th British Academy Film Awards	Best British Actor	Tom Courtenay	Nominated	
18th British Academy Film Awards	Best British Cinematography (Black-and-White)	Denys Coop	Nominated	
18th British Academy Film Awards	Best British Art Direction (Black-and-White)	Richard Macdonald	Nominated	
21st Nastro d'Argento Awards	Best Foreign Director	Joseph Losey	Nominated	
1976 Sant Jordi Awards	Best Actor in Foreign Film	Dirk Bogarde	Won	

== Sources ==
- Callahan, Dan. 2003. Losey, Joseph. Senses of Cinema, March 2003. Great Directors Issue 25.https://www.sensesofcinema.com/2003/greatdirectors/losey/#:~:text=The%20dominant%20themes%20of%20Losey's,love%20story%20in%20his%20films. Accessed 12 October, 2024.
- Hirsch, Foster. 1980. Joseph Losey. Twayne Publishers, Boston, Massachusetts. ISBN 0-8057-9257-0
- Palmer, James and Riley, Michael. 1993. The Films of Josef Losey. Cambridge University Press, Cambridge, England. ISBN 0-521-38386-2

== See also ==
- British Army during World War I
