= John Hearne (writer) =

Jamaican novelist, journalist and teacher. (1926–1994)

- Born: John Edgar Colwell Hearne; 4 February 1926; Montreal, Quebec, Canada
- Died: 12 December 1994 (aged 68)
- Other names: Jay Monroe; John Morris
- Education: Edinburgh University
- Occupations: Novelist, journalist and teacher

John Edgar Colwell Hearne (4 February 1926 – 12 December 1994) was a Jamaican novelist, journalist, and teacher.

== Biography ==
Hearne was born in Montreal, Quebec, Canada, of Jamaican parents and attended Jamaica College in Kingston. After serving in the RAF during the Second World War, he read English and Philosophy at Edinburgh University. He trained as a teacher at London University and from 1950 to 1952 taught in a Jamaican school. He also worked as a journalist.

He then travelled in Europe for some years (part of the time with novelist Roger Mais), before returning to Jamaica in 1957. Hearne returned to the UK in the summer of 1958 and taught English at Midhurst Grammar School before working in journalism into 1960. He was subsequently on the staff of the Extra-Mural Department of the University of the West Indies, Mona.

== Writing ==
Hearne's first published work was the novel Voices under the Window, issued in 1955. Set in Jamaica in the late 1940s or early 1950s, it uses the framing device of a progressive politician's injury and death in a riot to narrate the story of a man who, born into racial and economic privilege, decided to cast his lot with the underprivileged. Hearne won the 1956 John Llewellyn Rhys Prize – awarded for the best novel written by a British Commonwealth author aged under 30 – for Voices Under the Window, making him the first Caribbean author to win a major British literary prize.

Hearne followed this with four novels written between 1956 and 1961 – The Faces of Love, Stranger at the Gate, The Autumn Equinox and Land of the Living – set in the imaginary island of Cayuna, which is a fictionalized Jamaica (the map of Cayuna included with the novels bears a remarkable resemblance to Jamaica), and which referred to issues relating to Jamaican life at the time, such as the beginning of the bauxite industry and the Rastafari movement, or to events in nearby territories such as the Cuban Revolution. He also wrote a number of short stories, one of which, "At the Stelling", set in Guyana, was included in the Independence Anthology of Jamaican Literature.

Hearne then turned to the academy and journalism – writing a regular column for the Gleaner newspaper, first under the pseudonym Jay Monroe, and later under his own name, and administering the Creative Arts Centre (now the Sir Philip Sherlock Centre for the Creative Arts) at the University of the West Indies, as the Centre's first secretary.

In the late 1960s and early 1970s, he collaborated with planter and journalist Morris Cargill on a series of three thrillers – Fever Grass, The Candywine Development, and The Checkerboard Caper – involving an imaginary Jamaican secret service. These were written under the pseudonym John Morris. Fever Grass is cited in the Oxford English Dictionary as a source for the use of "fuck" as a noun.

In 1985, he published his last novel, The Sure Salvation, set on a slave ship crossing the Atlantic in the mid-19th century. The voyage ends in the imaginary British South American colony of Abari, also mentioned in The Checkerboard Caper.

== Legacy ==
In 2013, Caribbean Quarterly published the monograph John Hearne’s Life and Fiction: A Critical Biographical Study, written by his younger daughter Shivaun Hearne.

In 2016, a collection of Hearne's short fiction was published by the University of the West Indies Press, edited by Shivaun Hearne, with a foreword by Marlon James and an introduction by Kim Robinson-Walcott. Booker Prize-winner Marlon James has acknowledged that attending creative writing classes taught by Hearne at the University of the West Indies was a "game-changer" for him)

=== Archive ===
The University of the West Indies Mona campus in Jamaica holds the John Hearne Collection spanning 1982–1994. It consists of biographical papers, tributes, correspondence, newspaper clippings related to the death of John Hearne, his manuscripts and more.

== Bibliography ==
- Voices under the Window, London: Faber, 1955
- The Eye of the Storm, Boston: Little, Brown, 1958
- The Faces of Love, London: Faber, 1959
- Stranger at the Gate, London: Faber, 1959
- The Autumn Equinox, London: Faber, 1959
- Land of the Living, London: Faber, 1961
- The Sure Salvation, 1985
- John Hearne's Short Fiction, 2016. Edited by Shivaun Hearne; foreword by Marlon James; introduction by Kim Robinson-Walcott

=== As John Morris (with Morris Cargill) ===
- Fever Grass, Collins and Sangster, Kingston, 1969
- The Candywine Development, Collins and Sangster, Kingston, 1970
- The Checkerboard Caper, New Jersey: The Citadel Press, 1975
