= Laura Tanna =

American writer, journalist and Afro-Caribbean scholar (born 1947)

Laura Tanna OD (Hon.)
- Born: Laura Davidson; August 9, 1947 (age 79); Missoula, Montana, U.S.
- Education: University of California, Berkeley (BA); University of Wisconsin–Madison (MA, PhD)
- Occupations: Journalist; archivist; academic; writer; linguist; folklorist
- Spouse: Dhiru Tanna (m. 1970; died 2026)

Laura Davidson Tanna OD (Hon.) (née Davidson; born August 9, 1947) is an American journalist, archivist, Africanist and Caribbean scholar based in Jamaica. She was educated in the United States and France before undertaking research in Uganda. She is best known for her contributions as a Jamaican folklorist and journalist for The Gleaner.

== Early life ==
=== 1947–1962: family and education ===
Laura Tanna was born Laura Davidson on August 9, 1947, in Missoula, Montana, to the economist Ralph Kirby Davidson and the journalist Laura Agnes Devine. She was raised in West Lafayette, Indiana, in a Methodist Christian household. When Tanna was 14, her father, a Rhodes Scholar and academic, was asked by the Rockefeller Foundation to visit Makerere University in Kampala as part of the organization's University Development Program, which he would later head. The Davidson family arrived in Uganda in 1962, seeing the country gain her independence the same year. In Kampala, Tanna was educated at the H.H. Aga Khan Shia Imami Ismailia Secondary School. As a teenager, Tanna and her family also travelled extensively in Africa before relocating to New York City, where her father became formally employed by the Rockefeller Foundation. In New York, she attended Friends Seminary, a Quaker school in Manhattan.

=== 1965–1970: Berkeley, Stendhal and La Sorbonne ===
Tanna subsequently enrolled as an undergraduate at the University of California, Berkeley, studying in her junior year at Stendhal University and the University of Paris where she witnessed the student protests of 1968. At Berkeley, Tanna was involved in a demonstration at the British consulate in San Francisco, protesting Rhodesia's Unilateral Declaration of Independence. At this event, she met her future husband, the economist Dhiru Tanna. She was also the assistant editor of the publication Journal of the New African Literature and Arts (JORNALA), beginning in 1966. Tanna graduated from Berkeley with a Bachelor of Arts degree in Comparative Literature. In 1968, she and her future husband began living together; they were later married in Kampala on June 26, 1970.

== Career ==
=== 1970–1972: early career in Uganda ===
As a postgraduate, Tanna was offered two fellowships: one involved undertaking a master's degree at the University of California, Los Angeles, where she was invited to work on the African Arts journal; the other involved a three-year doctorate in African Literature at the University of Wisconsin–Madison. She chose the latter institution and studied Kiswahili under Harold Scheub. During this time, Tanna also lived for six months between 1970 and 1971 in Makerere with her husband while researching the Luganda language. She was scheduled to leave the country on January 25, 1971, the night of Idi Amin's coup d'état, but failed to reach her chartered flight due to the incident. Tanna managed to flee the country five days later, returning to Wisconsin to complete her integrated master's degree. She wrote her thesis on East African poetry, with a focus on Okot p'Bitek's epic poem Song of Lawino (1966) and the poetry of Okello Oculi.

Tanna returned to Uganda in 1972 to document the country under Amin's regime, witnessing the expulsion of the Asians that same year. She and her husband, who was of South Asian descent, assumed the latter was exempt from this edict due to his Ugandan citizenship, however his passport was briefly confiscated and the two were advised to flee the country. The couple further received a letter detailing the possibility of her hubsand being confined to an internment camp in Uganda, should they remain in the country to continue their research. The Tannas refugeed to the United States, living in California.

=== 1973–present: Jamaica ===
The Jamaican economist Marshall Hall, who had been a guest at Tanna's wedding at the invitation of her father and who was also later her husband's colleague at Makerere, invited the two to the University of the West Indies, Mona, in Jamaica. Tanna arrived in Jamaica on April 11, 1973, with the aim of furthering research into the legacy of African influences on Jamaican culture. While still in the United States, M. G. Smith, an anthropologist and advisor to Michael Manley, had given Tanna a list of Jamaican contacts including Olive Lewin and Adam Kuper, another of the prime minister's advisors. Lewin mentored Tanna; and the two would later work at the African Caribbean Institute of Jamaica / Jamaica Memory Bank (ACIJ/JMB), founded by Lewin under the auspices of Edward Seaga's government and partially funded by UNESCO.

In 1974, while gathering material for the ACIJ/JMB on the figure of Marcus Garvey in Jamaica's oral tradition in Kingston, Tanna and her Rastafarian interviewee were apprehended and held at gunpoint by two plainclothes policemen, one of whom was drunk. The men suspected Tanna was either involved in the narcotics trade or a foreign intelligence agent, both seeming a reasonable assumption for why a white person would be in a garrison community at the height of the Jamaican political conflict. Tanna was able to explain the nature of her work to the men and was subsequently released. The incident prompted Rex Nettleford to give Tanna a formal letter explaining her work, she later used this document when confronted by a Jamaican Defence Force patrol in a similar situation.

Tanna served on the board of the Institute of Jamaica (IOJ) from 1983 to 1995, during which time the IOJ published her PhD in the form of her first book, Jamaican Folk Tales and Oral Histories (1984). She also sat on the advisory board of the African Caribbean Institute of Jamaica between 1985–1997 and was director of the King's House Foundation from 2000 to 2012.

== Honors ==
- 2014: the Jamaican government appointed Tanna to the Order of Distinction, Officer Class (honorary), "For her invaluable contributions to Jamaican Literature and Culture".
- 2023: Sir Patrick Allen awarded Tanna with the Governor-General's Medal of Honour.

== Personal life ==
Laura (then Davidson) married Dhiru Tanna in Uganda on June 26, 1970. Dhiru Tanna died on April 14, 2026, at the age of 82.

Other than her friendships with fellow academics, Tanna was also a friend of the Jamaican writer Evan Jones, helping him to publish his novel Stone Haven through the IOJ in 1993.

== Books ==
| Date | Title | Publisher | ISBN | Pages | Note |
|---|---|---|---|---|---|
| 1984 | Jamaican Folk Tales and Oral Histories | Institute of Jamaica Press | 978-976-8017-19-2 | 150 | |
| 1986 | Baugh, Jamaica's Master Potter | DLT Associates | 978-0-9674991-0-9 | 126 | Contributed to by Cecil Baugh. |
| 2020 | The Lady of Silk and Steel: From Everest to Embassies | Ian Randle Publishers | 978-976-8286-19-2 | 384 | As editor and contributor, co-authored by Sue M. Cobb. |
