= Agaguk =

1958 novel by Yves Thériault

- First edition
- Author: Yves Thériault
- Language: French
- Publisher: Institut littéraire de Québec-Grasset
- Publication date: 1958
- Publication place: Canada
- Media type: Hard cover
- Pages: 315

Agaguk is the sixth novel written by Quebec author Yves Thériault. First published in 1958, it sold 300,000 copies and was translated into seven languages.

== Plot summary ==
This novel is a story of cultural conflict between the Inuit of Northern Quebec and white men, set in the 1940s. It is told from the perspective of the main character Agaguk, an Inuk man. Agaguk diverges from his tribe with a woman named Iriook. Through their journeys, Yves Thériault explores Agaguk's mastery of nature as well as the general relationship between the Inuit and the tundra. Furthermore, by describing the conflicts with the white men, the themes of alcoholism, assimilation as well as economic and judicial injustice are thoroughly explored. The personal aspect of the novel also allows for an analysis of Agaguk and his behaviour towards his wife, Iriook, in particular. Initially portrayed as a supportive partner to Agaguk, Iriook's role evolves significantly as the story progresses, especially when faced with extreme challenges.

== Awards and nominations ==
Grand Prix de la Province de Québec.

== Translations ==
An English translation by Miriam Chapin was published on 1963 via Ryerson Press.

== Film adaptation ==
The novel was made into a movie with the title Shadow of the Wolf by Jacques Dorfmann in 1992, with Lou Diamond Phillips, Toshiro Mifune, Jennifer Tilly, Bernard-Pierre Donnadieu, and Donald Sutherland. The screenplay was written by Evan Jones.
