= The Damned (1962 film) =

1962 film directed by Joseph Losey

- Theatrical release poster
- Directed by: Joseph Losey
- Screenplay by: Evan Jones
- Based on: The Children of Light (1960 novel) by H.L. Lawrence
- Produced by: Anthony Hinds
- Starring: Macdonald Carey; Shirley Anne Field; Viveca Lindfors; Oliver Reed; Alexander Knox
- Cinematography: Arthur Grant
- Edited by: Reginald Mills
- Music by: James Bernard
- Production company: Hammer Film Productions
- Distributed by: Columbia Pictures
- Release dates: 16 November 1962 (Australia); 19 May 1963 (UK)
- Running time: 95 minutes (uncut); 87 minutes (UK); 77 minutes (US)
- Country: United Kingdom
- Language: English
- Budget: £170,000 or £160,000

The Damned (released in the United States as These Are the Damned) is a 1962 British science-fiction horror film directed by Joseph Losey and produced by Anthony Hinds for Hammer Film Productions. It stars Macdonald Carey, Shirley Anne Field, Viveca Lindfors, Oliver Reed, and Alexander Knox. The screenplay by Evan Jones is based on H. L. Lawrence's 1960 novel The Children of Light. The plot is about a vacationing American (Carey) who stumbles across a mysterious group of children who reside in an underground compound in Dorset, that are monitored constantly by military scientists.

Director Losey and producer Hinds clashed during production over the film’s bleak, cerebral tone, and the runtime was reduced from its initial 95 minutes to 87 minutes. It was not released in Britain until May 1963, where it received positive reviews from critics. Losey’s original 95-minute cut was later released on home video. The British Film Institute described it as "among Hammer's finest and most haunting productions."

== Plot ==
Simon Wells, a middle-aged American tourist, is on a boating holiday off the south coast of England. He has recently divorced and left his career as an insurance executive. In Weymouth, he meets 20-year-old Joan, who lures him into a brutal mugging at the hands of her brother King and his motorbike gang.

The next day Joan joins Simon on his boat, and defies her overprotective brother who attempts to keep her from leaving.

Simon is willing to forgive and forget; Joan implies that the beating was inevitable after Simon attempted to pick up Joan in a bar. She describes the abuse she suffers from King whenever men show interest in her. Simon urges her to run away with him but she insists upon returning to shore. Their time on the water is observed by a member of King's gang.

Meanwhile, within the caves of the nearby coast live nine children, all aged 11, whose skin is cold to the touch. They appear healthy, well-dressed and intelligent but know little about the outside world. Their home is under continuous video surveillance and they are educated via closed circuit television by Bernard, who deflects questions about their purpose and their isolation with promises that they will learn the answers someday. The children are regularly visited by men in radiation protection suits.

That night, Joan and Simon meet at a cliff-top house where they have sex. The house is surrounded by King's gang but the couple escape and reach the relative safety of a nearby military base. The couple descend the cliff to the beach, pursued by King. They find a network of caves leading to an underground bunker attached to the military base, where they meet the children.

Although Bernard is forced to keep the children under watch, he allows them one chamber in the caves without cameras. The children are unaware that their "secret hideout" is known to their captors and they keep their mementos of people that they believe are their parents. The children host Joan, Simon and King in this "secret" room and smuggle food to them. Joan and Simon plan to rescue the children and they pressure King into helping them; the visitors soon feel unwell.

Bernard urges the children to give up their new friends and reveals his knowledge of their secret place. The children refuse and destroy the surveillance cameras. Bernard sends men in radiation suits but King and Simon overpower them. Simon uses one of their Geiger counters and discovers that the children are radioactive. The intruders lead the children out of the caves but they are ambushed by more men in radiation suits and most of the children are taken back to the bunker.

King grabs one of the boys and escapes in a stolen car. He is overcome by radiation sickness and orders the boy out of the car. The boy is immediately recaptured. King is pursued by a helicopter, loses control of the car and is killed. Joan and Simon escape by boat but they are also overcome by sickness. A helicopter hovers above as their boat drifts off course; the pilot has orders to destroy it once the occupants are confirmed dead.

Bernard confides in his mistress Freya that he regrets the children now know they are prisoners. They were born radioactive, the result of a nuclear accident. This enables them to be resistant to nuclear fallout and so they will survive the "inevitable" nuclear war to come, according to Bernard. When Freya rejects him and his plan, he kills her.

The final scene depicts holidaymakers enjoying the beach, unable to hear the desperate cries of the imprisoned children nearby.

== Cast ==
- Macdonald Carey as Simon Wells
- Shirley Anne Field as Joan
- Viveca Lindfors as Freya Neilson
- Oliver Reed as King
- Alexander Knox as Bernard
- Walter Gotell as Major Holland
- James Villiers as Captain Gregory
- Tom Kempinski as Ted
- Kenneth Cope as Sid
- Brian Oulton as Mr. Dingle
- Barbara Everest as Miss Lamont
- Alan McClelland as Mr. Stuart
- James Maxwell as Mr. Talbot
- Larry Martyn and Anthony Valentine as Gang Members

The children

- Rachel Clay as Victoria
- Caroline Sheldon as Elizabeth
- Rebecca Dignam as Anne
- Siobhan Taylor as Mary
- Nicholas Clay as Richard
- Kit Williams as Henry
- Christopher Witty as William
- David Palmer as George
- John Thompson as Charles

== Themes ==
Film historians James Palmer and Michael Riley call The Damned "an effective polemic against the horrors of nuclear warfare."

Writing in Senses of Cinema, critic Dan Callahan, places the film only incidentally in the sci-fi genre, and more so as warning of approaching Armageddon: “The Damned is a sincere and outraged portrait of a world on the verge of apocalypse, only partially compromised by a science fiction plot involving radioactive kids.”

== Production ==
=== Development ===
Hammer Productions boss Anthony Hinds obtained the film rights to H. L. Lawrence's 1960 novel The Children of Light, wanting to create a movie similar to MGM's Village of the Damned, which had been a marked success.

Expatriate American director Joseph Losey was hesitant to accept a directorial assignment from Hammer, a studio “internationally associated with the horror genre and work of a deliberately provocative nature.” Losey had previously been attached to direct Hammer's X the Unknown (1956), but left during pre-production because actor Dean Jagger refused to work with him over political differences. Losey's 1960 film The Criminal (1960), a “box office failure” limited Losey’s options, and he accepted the offer despite objecting to screenplays requiring “explicit physical violence.”

=== Writing ===
A script was originally written by Ben Barzman, Losey's frequent screenwriting collaborator, which was reasonably faithful to the original novel. Losey disliked it and had it completely rewritten by Evan Jones two weeks prior to filming. Jones would subsequently become a regular Losey collaborator.

Losey originally wanted Freya the sculptor to be killed by one of the helicopters but the studio insisted that Bernard kill her. The studio also wished to tone down the incestuous references between King and Joan.

=== Casting ===
Distributor Columbia Pictures requested an American lead actor to help the film's overseas prospects. Losey hired Macdonald Carey, who had previously starred in his 1950 film The Lawless. Losey also brought in actors Alexander Knox and Kenneth Cope, with whom he had previously worked. Knox, like Losey, was a Hollywood blacklistee and the two men were frequent collaborators.

The Damned was one of several roles Oliver Reed played for Hammer during the early 1960s, the same year he also starred in Captain Clegg and The Pirates of Blood River.

=== Filming ===
The film was shot in May–June 1961, at Hammer's Bray Studios and on location around Weymouth, the Isle of Portland and nearby Chesil Beach. Oliver Reed recalled that Losey, "used to take the cast out to dinner and preach anti-Bomb stuff to them." The film went over budget by £25,000.

The sculptures featured were all by British artist Elisabeth Frink. Frink not only lent these but also was on location for their shooting, and coached Lindfors on performing the sculptor's method of building up plaster, which was then ferociously worked and carved.

=== Editing ===
The film was reviewed by the BBFC on 20 December 1961, who gave it an X certificate without any cuts. However, producer Anthony Hinds demanded re-edits, fearing the film's bleak and cerebral tone would hurt its commercial prospects. Losey eventually relented, cutting approximately eight minutes. The film was also retitled from Losey's preferred The Brink to The Damned, to better link it to Village of the Damned.

== Release ==
The film was first released in Australia on November 16, 1962. It was not released in Britain until 20 May 1963, when it was shown at the London Pavilion as the second half of a double bill of X-rated horror films.

When it was released in the United States in 1965, as These Are the Damned, it had been cut further to 77 minutes. It was originally shown as part of a double bill with Genghis Khan. A complete print was released in US art house cinemas in 2007.

=== Home media ===
On 15 January 2010, it was released on DVD as part of the Icons of Suspense Collection from Hammer Films. The Damned was called "the highpoint of the first wave of the British postwar Science Fiction films".

Losey's original 95-minute version has since been restored and released on Blu-Ray.

== Reception ==
=== Critical response ===
In spite of the discreet release, The Damned was noticed by a film critic from The Times, who gave it a very positive review, stating that "Joseph Losey is one of the most intelligent, ambitious and constantly exciting film-makers now working in this country, if not indeed in the world—The Damned is very much a film to be seen, for at its best it hits with a certainty of aim which is as exciting as it is devastating, and hits perhaps in a place where it is important we should be hurt."

The Monthly Film Bulletin wrote: "The Damned is a folie de grandeur which demonstrates ... that Losey is a brilliant and often inventive technician whose uncertain selective powers are just as likely to lead him to absurdity as art. If the film had been content to stay on its own level it might have been a very good science fiction thriller. As it is, it is blown up to try to make a grand philosophical and sociological comment on the various evils gnawing away at modern society. ...Nevertheless, there are moments throughout which compel attention: an inexplicable menace latent in a calm shot out to sea; Viveca Lindfors (who gives point and dignity to every scene in which she appears) crooning helplessly over the shattered remnants of one of her statues, wilfully smashed by King; the strangely ritual little scene in which the coldblooded children take turns to touch, solemnly and wonderingly, the warm-blooded strangers who have invaded their hideout."

Critic Dave Kehr, writing in The New York Times called the film "a slippery, unsettling blend of social commentary and science-fiction".

On the review aggregation website Rotten Tomatoes, which records both contemporaneous and more recent reviews, The Damned holds an 88% approval rating based on 8 critic reviews.

==== Retrospective reviews ====
John Oliver, writing for BFI Screenonline, said "[The Damned] is a strange, sometimes uneven, but always compelling hybrid of science fiction and 1950s teenage gang exploitation. It is unquestionably one of the more unusual films to have emerged from the Hammer stable.... Regardless, The Damned is one of [Losey's] most intriguing and undervalued works, and among Hammer's finest and most haunting productions."

Dave Callahan in Senses of Cinema adds that The Damned marked an inflection in Losey’s career, gaining him a measure of legitimacy in the international film establishment.

== See also ==
- Akira (1988 film)
- Village of the Damned (1960 film)

== Sources ==
- Callahan, Dan. 2003. Losey, Joseph. Senses of Cinema, March 2003. Great Directors Issue 25.https://www.sensesofcinema.com/2003/great-directors/losey/#:~:text=The%20dominant%20themes%20of%20Losey's,love%20story%20in%20his%20films. Accessed 12 October 2024.
- Maras, Robert. 2012. Dissecting class relations: The film collaborations of Joseph Losey and Harold Pinter. World Socialist Web Site, May 28, 2012. https://www.wsws.org/en/articles/2012/05/lose-m28.html Accessed 12 October 2024.
- Sanjek, David. 2002. Cold, Cold Heart: Joseph Losey's The Damned and the Compensations of Genre. Senses of Cinema, July 2002. Director: Joseph Losey Issue 21. https://www.sensesofcinema.com/2002/director-joseph-losey/losey_damned/ Accessed 10 October 2024.
- Dixon, Wheeler Winston. 2014. Hollywood Exiles in Europe. Film International, February 3, 2014.https://filmint.nu/hollywood-exiles-in-europe/ Accessed 10 October 2024.
