= Titchfield High School =

Titchfield High School, Jamaica

Location
- 22 Fort George Street, Port Antonio, Jamaica; Surrey; Jamaica
- 18.1841°N 76.4494°W

Information
- School type: Trust/Public
- Motto: Virtute et eruditione (Latin to English: By virtue and by learning.)
- Established: 1786
- Chairman: Mrs. Fay Neufville
- Principal: Richard A. Thompson
- Teaching staff: 101
- Grades: 7-13
- Language: English (British)
- Hours in school day: 8.5
- Colors: Blue and Gold
- Song: Follow up! Follow up!
- Nickname: Titch
- Accreditation: Ministry of Education, Jamaica
- Newspaper: The Titchfield Peninsular
- Website: www.titchfieldhigh.com

Titchfield High School is a secondary high school in Port Antonio, Jamaica, in the northern part of Portland Parish. The school was established in January 1786, and is the fifth-oldest high school in the country, after Wolmer's Boys', one of the Wolmer's Schools (1729), Manning's School (1738), St. Jago High School (1744), and Rusea's High School (1777). In the 18th century, these schools originated from their benefactors’ concerns for the education of the country’s poor, usually the children of poor whites, as there was no system in place for the education of the children of slaves.

In 1883, the Jamaica School Commission took over the management of the school from the school's trust. According to the Alumni Association of Titchfield High, South Florida chapter, as of January 2008, there were 99 teachers for 1949 students in grades 7-13.

Titchfield was the first school to win Inter-Secondary Schools Girls Championships back to back, in 1963 and 1964 (its only two titles). In both 2011 and 2012, the school placed second in Television Jamaica's School Challenge Quiz. In 2016, the team, which included Demario Asquitt, Zedan Martin, Tajay Edwards and Rajae Chambers and coached by Mr C. Roberts and Mr A. Sparks, won the competition, defeating Campion College in the final match. This was the first win by a rural school in almost two decades and also made them only the 13th school to ever win the competition.

The school has six extra-curricular houses named after the school's past principals and/or outstanding benefactors. They are: Brown, Chin, Geddes, Grossett, Plant and Sherlock.

== Alumni ==
- Edward Baugh (1936–2023), professor at University of the West Indies, poet and scholar;
- Donald J. Harris (born 1938), economist and father of US Vice President Kamala Harris;
- Ishion Hutchinson (born 1983), lecturer at Cornell University, poet and scholar;
- Fred M. Jones (1890–1971), planter and Custos of Portland;
- Michael Lee-Chin (born 1951), billionaire business magnate, investor and philanthropist;
- Dever Orgill (born 1990), footballer;
- Bryan Sykes (fl. 2010s–2020s), Chief Justice of Jamaica since 2019;
- Manley West (1929–2012), professor and pioneer pharmacologist.
