= Denys Coop =

English cinematographer (1920–1981)

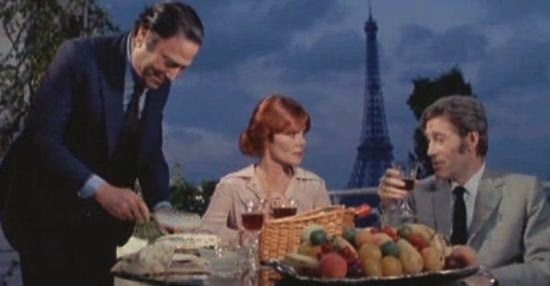
- A trailer from the film Rosebud (1975), Coop's last film as cinematographer.
- Born: Denys Neil Coop; 20 July 1920; Reading, Berkshire, England
- Died: 16 August 1981 (aged 61); Hertfordshire, England
- Other names: Denys N. Coop; Dennis Coop
- Occupations: Camera operator Cinematographer
- Years active: 1936–1981

Denys Neil Coop, BSC (20 July 1920 – 16 August 1981) was an English cinematographer. He was nominated for three consecutive BAFTA Awards for Best Cinematography (Black-and-White), for his work Billy Liar (1963), King and Country (1964), and Bunny Lake Is Missing (1965). He later won a Special Achievement Academy Award and the BAFTA Michael Balcon Award for his contributions to the visual effects of Superman (1978).

Coop was the president of the British Society of Cinematographers from 1973 to 1975.

== Early life and career ==
He began his career in the cinema as an apprentice to Freddie Young. In the 1960s, he was Director of Photography on films such as A Kind of Loving (1962), This Sporting Life (1963), Billy Liar (1963) and Bunny Lake Is Missing (1965).

== Awards and nominations ==
In 1979, he was one of a team of artists to win a special Oscar for visual effects in Superman.

In addition to the Oscar, Coop was also awarded a BAFTA (the Michael Balcon award) for his work on Superman (as Creative Director of Process Photography). He was also awarded the Bert Easey award by the British Society of Cinematographers.

He was nominated for the Best Cinematography (B&W) BAFTA in 1964 for Billy Liar, in 1965 for King and Country, and in 1967 for Bunny Lake is Missing. His black and white cinematography on films such as these, and This Sporting Life amongst others earned him the reputation as one of the finest B&W cinematographers of his generation.

== Personal life ==
He was followed into the film industry by his son, Trevor (a camera operator), and his three grandchildren, Jason (focus puller), Gareth (a clapper loader) and Amy (an assistant director).
