= Clarine Stephenson =

Jamaican novelist and poet

Clarine Stephenson was a Jamaican novelist and poet, one of the first women writers in Jamaica.

Stephenson's novel Undine tells the story of a Jamaican governess, described in the novel as a "creole child of wealth, reared in the midst of luxury and idleness". Forced to return to Jamaica to work as a governess, she escapes the dust of the city and falls in love with an Englishman. The Jamaican countryside is idealised as an "Eden", the "sweet dreamland of these happy hills". After having her heart broken, she dies, having a vision of her former lover as Jesus Christ. Kim Robinson-Walcott has remarked the fact that the novel features no black characters.

== Works ==
- 'The White Man's Prophecy', Jamaica Times, 21 August 1909.
- Undine: An Experience. New York: Broadway Publishing House, 1911.
- 'A West Indian miscellany: chip lagwood'. West Indian review, Vol. 2, no. 1 (Sept. 1935), p.59
