= The Song of the Banana Man =

1952 poem by Evan Jones

- by Evan Jones
- Written: 1952
- First published in: Bim
- Language: English; Jamaican Patois
- Form: Dramatic monologue
- Publication date: 1954

"The Song of the Banana Man" is a poem by Evan Jones, written in 1952 and first published in the Barbadian literary magazine Bim in 1953. It is the first poem by Jones to be published and is his most widely anthologised. The poem is an early example of Jamaican vernacular language set to standard metrical verse.

== Summary ==
Bananas being loaded at Port Antonio, Portland, c. 1920

The poem is a dramatic monologue in seven stanzas, written in Jamaican Patois and set to standard English metrical verse. It opens in the market place of Golden Grove, Saint Thomas, and is an account of a banana farmer's response to a white tourist's assumption that he is a beggar. The poem details the life of a banana farmer, punctuated by variations in phrasing on the refrain "Praise God and m'big right han [/] I will live and die a banana man".

== History ==
=== Background and composition ===
Evan Jones was born in rural Portland, Jamaica, and attended the boarding school Munro College in the countryside of Saint Elizabeth. His father, Fred M. Jones, was one of the largest single landowners in Jamaica and a planter of sugar and bananas in the parishes of Portland and Saint Thomas, the setting of his poem. Jones wrote "The Song of the Banana Man" while a student at Wadham College, Oxford to settle a debate with Neville Dawes, where Jones proposed Caribbean verse should not simply be written in standard English nor purely in dialect, but should "incorporate the rhythms and language of both". On this, Angus Fraser writes for The Bodliean Library Record:

Jamaican poet Evan Jones in Song of The Banana Man features a conversation between a local islander and a patronizing white tourist. In his first typescript, both characters use similarly formal English which is altered in the next version to reflect their differences. The local's "with" changes to "wid", "the" to "de", and "Turned up his nose" becomes the more authentic "turn' up his nose".

=== Publication and popularisation ===
"The Song of the Banana Man" was first broadcast on the BBC World Service's Caribbean Voices programme in 1953 and published in the Barbadian literary magazine Bim in 1954. The poem was included in influential anthologies of Caribbean verse such as Anne Walmsley's The Sun's Eye (1968) and Andrew Salkey's Breaklight (1971), becoming popularly taught in Caribbean schools. The Saint Lucian poet Kendel Hippolyte attributed the success of the poem to its ability to be appeal to both children and adults.

== Interpretation and criticism ==
The academic Al Creighton, writing for Stabroek News, recognises "The Song of the Banana Man" as belonging to the movement of nationalist art that emerged in the wake of the British West Indian labour riots of the 1930s. Creighton identifies other notable works of this movement as Edna Manley's sculpture "Negro Aroused" (1935), Alvin Marriott's sculpture "Banana Man" (1955), V. S. Reid's novel New Day (1949) and the poetry and plays of Una Marson. The academic Paula Bernett, in her introduction to The Penguin Book of Caribbean Verse in English (1986), describes Jones's "The Song of the Banana Man" and its companion piece "The Lament of the Banana Man" (1962) as "early in the field" of vernacular "persona poem sequences". According to Jones's grandson, writing for The Gleaner, at one point Jones was told "he was not nearly big enough or black enough to have written [the poem]".

== Legacy ==
Lorna Goodison, former poet laureate of Jamaica, has cited "The Song of the Banana Man" as an influence on her poetry, as has the current poet laureate of Jamaica, Kwame Dawes. The British poet Raymond Antrobus grew up with the poem on his bedroom wall, put there by his Jamaican father. The poem was a significant influence on the dub poets, beginning in the 1970s, namely on Linton Kwesi Johnson, Mikey Smith and Mutabaruka. In 1989, the dub poet Abeng included an adaptation of Jones's "The Song of the Banana Man" on his album Unconquerebel; The song having first been released on the EP The Banana Man / Ultimatum South Africa (1987). More recently, the dub peot Richie Innocent has referenced "The Song of the Banana Man" as an early influence.

In 2024–25, drafts of "The Song of the Banana Man", from Jones's archive, were displayed at the Weston Library, University of Oxford, as part of the exhibition Write Cut Rewrite curated by professors Dirk Van Hulle and Mark Nixon.

In 2026, Jason Keats Hall, high comissioner from Jamaica to India, performed "The Song of the Banana Man" with the backing of dub music at a literary reception at the Austrian embassy in New Delhi.

== "The Lament of the Banana Man" ==
"The Lament of the Banana Man", written in 1962, is a companion piece or sequel to "The Song of the Banana Man", depicting a dejected Jamaican immigrant working on the London Underground, perhaps the speaker of Jones's earlier poem. The poem has been anthologised less frequently than "The Song of The Banana Man" but was nonetheless influential amongst Caribbean poets, namely Marc Matthews, who knew Jones through their shared involvement with the Caribbean Artists Movement in London. Matthews included a performance of "The Lament of the Banana Man" on his influential dub poetry LP, Marc Matthews & Friends - Live (1978).
