= Ken Jones (Jamaican politician) =

Jamaican politician (1924–1964)

The Honourable Kenneth Jones JP
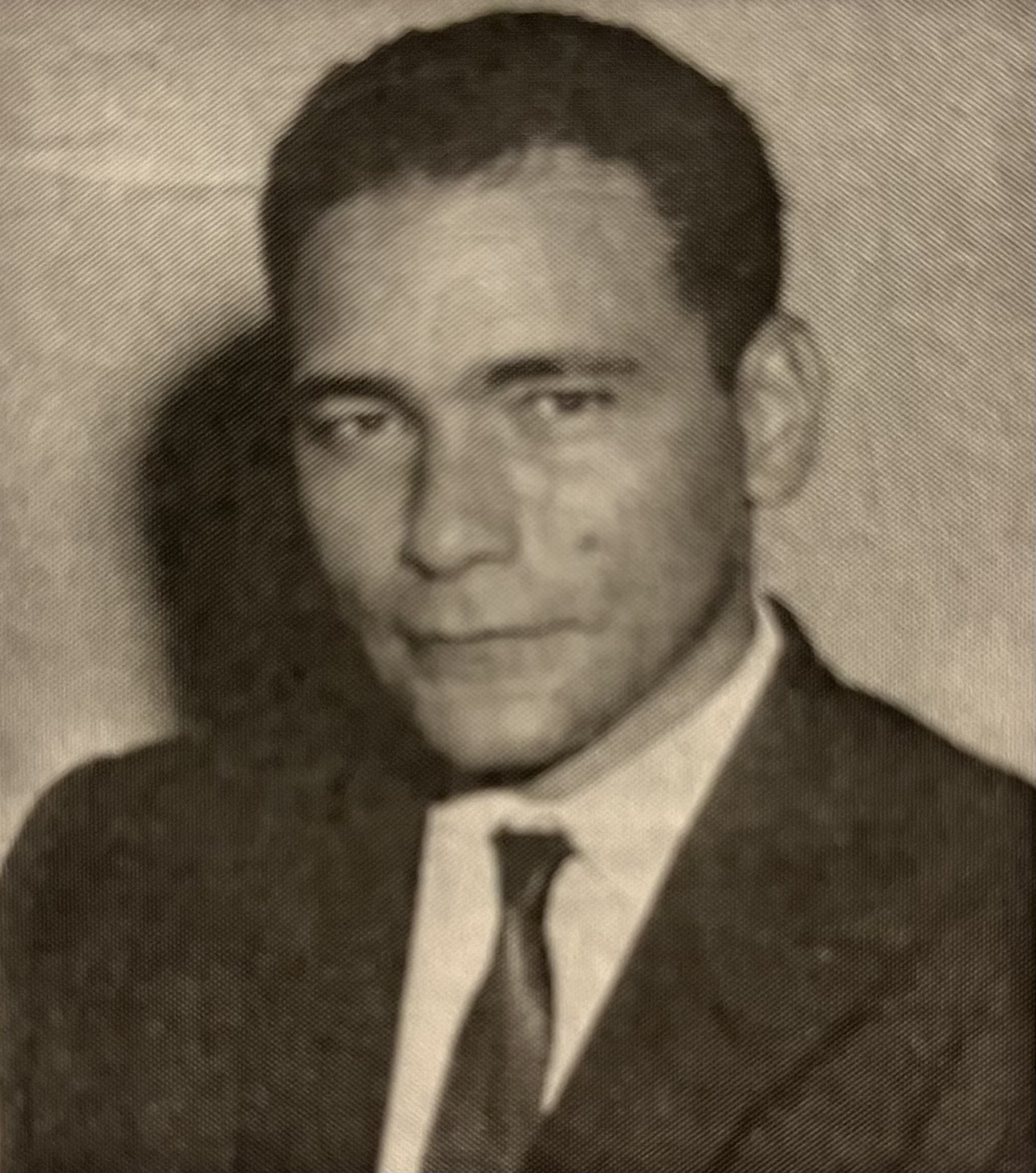

Minister of Communications and Works
- In office 1962 – 1964 (his death)
- Monarch: Elizabeth II
- Prime Minister: Sir Alexander Bustamante

Member of Parliament
- Preceded by: Sir Harold Allan
- Succeeded by: Clement T. Afflick
- Constituency: Portland Eastern

Personal details
- Born: Kenneth Arthur Newton Jones; 1 September 1924 Hector's River, Portland, Colony of Jamaica, British Empire
- Died: 11 October 1964 (aged 40) Montego Bay, St James, Jamaica
- Party: Jamaican Labour Party (JLP)
- Spouse: Marlene d'Auvergne Holtz (m. 1958)
- Relations: Evan Jones (brother); Melissa Jones (niece); Sadie Jones (niece)
- Children: 1
- Parents: Fred M. Jones; Gladys Smith
- Education: Earlham College
- Military career
- Allegiance: United Kingdom
- Branch: Royal Air Force
- Service years: 1944–1945
- Rank: Sergeant Pilot
- Service number: 605597
- Conflicts: The Second World War

Kenneth Arthur Newton Jones JP (1 September 1924 – 11 October 1964) was a Jamaican Labour Party (JLP) politician and Minister of Communications and Works in the nation's first independent Cabinet from 1962 until his death in 1964.

== Biography ==
=== Early life and family ===
Jones and his twin brother Keith Frederick Newton Jones were born at Stone Haven, his family's home in Hector's River, Portland. His father, Fred M. Jones, was a wealthy planter and public figure who would later become Custos of Portland. His mother, Gladys (née Smith), was an American Quaker educator who in 1918 had come to Portland as a missionary, teaching at Happy Grove School. There, she played an important role helping to transform it from a vocational to academic institution. Jones was also the elder brother of the writer Evan Jones.

Jones's interest in public service perhaps originated from his parents, both of whom were appointed to the Order of the British Empire for their charitable and civic works: In Elizebeth II's 1959 New Year Honours, Gladys Jones was awarded the rank of Member, the same year she was serving as a justice of the peace. Fred M. Jones was granted the rank of Officer in Her Majesty's 1963 New Year Honours.

=== Education and military service ===
Jones attended the prestigious Munro College, a boarding school for boys in Saint Elizabeth, between 1935 and 1942. Subsequently, he left Jamaica to attended Earlham College in Indiana, United States. On 19 May 1943, however, he joined the Royal Air Force (RAF). Upon completion of his training in Canada, 1944, and arriving in the United Kingdom, Jones was recorded as a Sergeant Pilot. During the last year of the War, he served alongside his school friends Flight Lieutenant David Errol Chance and Flying Officer Oliver Marshall. During the Second World War, an estimated 400 Jamaicans served as air crew in the RAF, of which Jones was one.

=== Political career ===
In 1946, Jones returned to Jamaica, first working as the director of his family's business, Fred M. Jones Estates, and as vice president of the Portland Chamber of Commerce. In 1951, however, he was elected to the Portland Parochial Board, marking the beginning of his career in public service.

In 1953, he served as a justice of the peace and in 1955 he was elected to the House of Representatives as member of parliament for Portland Eastern. In 1962, Ken Jones was appointed Minister of Communications and Works of Jamaica. The major achievements during his tenure include:

- Launching a program to twin the bridges on the national highway.
- Commencing work on the Sandy Gully Drainage System in Kingston.
- Instituting a program to build post offices with living quarters upstairs.
- Transatlantic telephone service was opened to the UK and agreements were in place for Air Canada and Lufthansa to commence service to Jamaica.

Political sociologist Carl Stone wrote that Jones was a member of the JLP's 'heavyweight leadership' and that, had he not died, he may have succeeded Sir Alexander Bustamante as leader of the Party.

== Personal life and death ==
In 1958, Jones married Marlene d'Auvergne Holtz of Kingston, to which a daughter was born in 1960.

Jones was a Freemason belonging to St Thomas Lodge No. 4338, who reached the rank of Master Mason.

On 11 October 1964, Jones . The Daily Gleaner, Jamaica's pre-eminent newspaper, reported his death with these words:

MONTEGO BAY, S.J., Oct. 11: THE HON. KENNETH JONES, Minister of Communications and Works, died in the Montego Bay hospital this morning as a result of injuries he suffered in a fall from the upstairs balcony of his room at the Sunset Lodge Hotel, where members of the Cabinet, other members of the Parliament and their top Civil Service advisers were spending the week-end in a special "retreat" conference to review Government politics and plan future action.

It was concluded that Jones had died from injuries sustained from a fall from his hotel balcony while sleepwalking. However, the cause of his death remains controversial, with many suspecting varying degrees of foul play. In 1994, The Gleaner published a series of articles questioning the legitimacy of the subsequent inquest and other suspicious circumstances surrounding his death. Chiefly, the newspaper reported that hotel staff who were witness to Jones's death were pressured to revise their statements by police and that a bloodstain in his room was painted over. Two witnesses reported seeing an unidentified woman on his balcony after he fell.

The novelist Marlon James described Jones as 'our Kennedy': a politician whose bipartisan appeal endangered him during the Jamaican political conflict.

Jones's funeral was held at the Friend's Church in Happy Grove, Portland, and attended by thousands of mourners who had gathered to hear the service on loudspeakers. In attendance was the Governor-General of Jamaica, Sir Clifford Campbell; the Prime Minister, Sir Alexander Bustamante; as well as three future Prime Ministers, Michael Manley, Hugh Shearer and Edward Seaga.

== Legacy ==
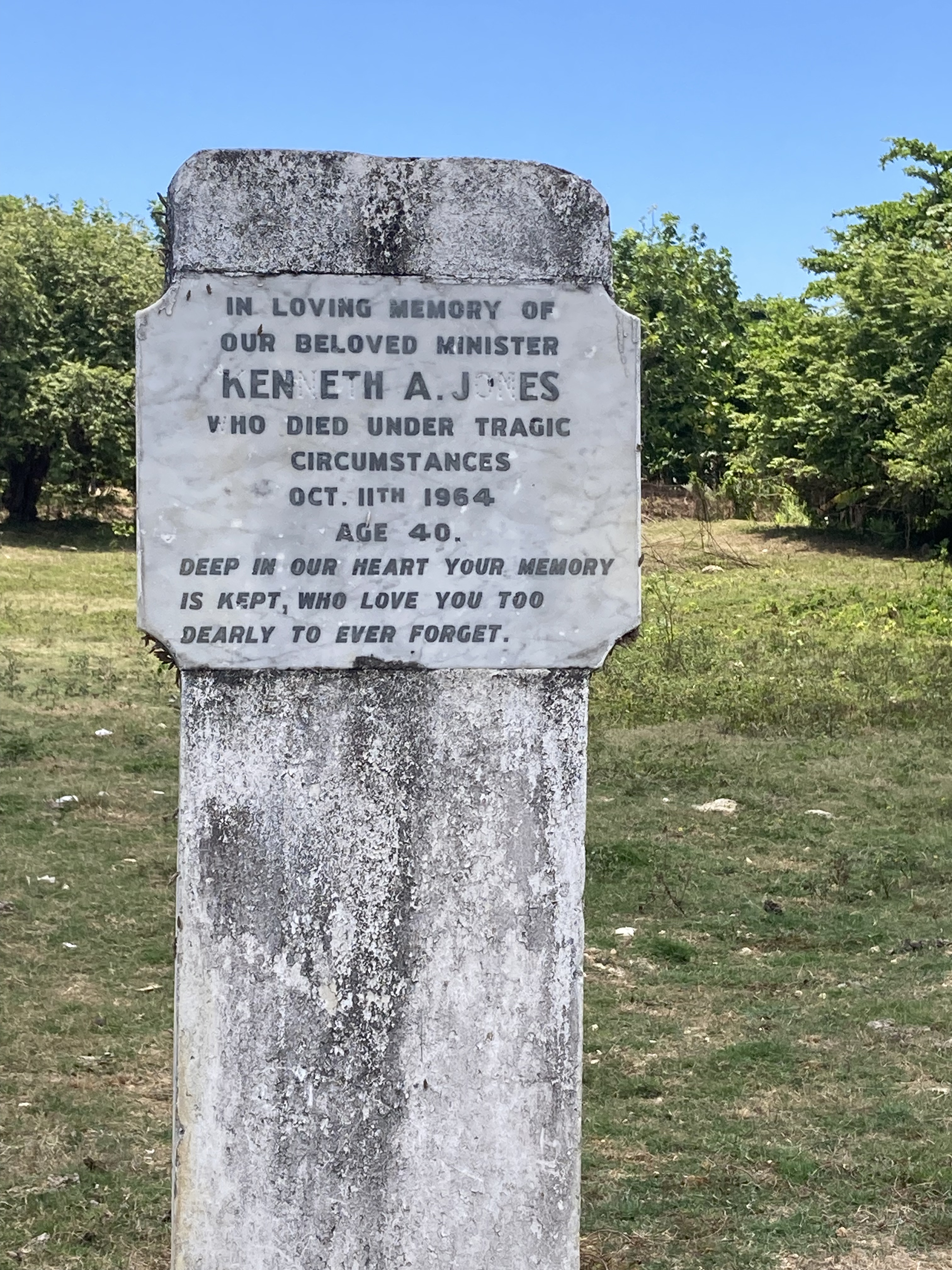
A roadside monument to Ken Jones.

Several places in Jamaica are named in Ken Jones's honour, including:

- The Ken Jones Aerodrome in Saint Margaret's Bay, Portland
- The Ken Jones Highway in Saint Thomas
- The Ken Jones Park in Manchioneal, Portland
- The Ken Jones Post Office in Haddington, Hanover

=== In literature ===
Ken Jones's mysterious death is portrayed in his brother Evan's novel Stone Haven (1993). In the novel, his character is called John Newton. Another of his novels, Alonso and the Drug Baron (2006), begins with the political assassination of a man who is thrown from his hotel balcony.

One of the narrators of Marlon James's novel A Brief History of Seven Killings (2014), the ghost of Sir Arthur George Jennings, is based on Jones.
