= BBC Sunday-Night Play =

British TV drama series (1960–1963)

- Genre: Drama
- Starring: Brian Rix; Joby Blanshard; Cyril Luckham; John Bennett; Peter Sallis; Larry Noble; Richard Pasco; Reginald Jessup; Frank Seiman; Nigel Stock
- Country of origin: United Kingdom
- Original language: English
- No. of episodes: 138 (123 missing)

Original release
- Network: BBC Television
- Release: 1960 – 1963

BBC Sunday-Night Play (Note: Sources vary over the precise name. IMDb uses the name given complete with the hyphen, while lostshows.com has The Sunday Night Play and Radio Times lists it as The Sunday-Night Play. Asa Briggs mentions that The Sunday Play replaced Sunday Night Theatre in 1960.) is the anthology drama series which replaced Sunday Night Theatre in 1960. It was broadcast on what was then BBC Television (now BBC One).

The series often included versions of modern theatrical successes, but original work appeared in the slot too. David Mercer's A Suitable Case for Treatment (1962) was later adapted as the feature film Morgan – A Suitable Case for Treatment (1966), while Madhouse on Castle Street (1963) starred the then little known Bob Dylan.

The series ended in 1963. Out of a run of 138 episodes, only 15 are believed to survive. (Note: See wiping.)

== Episodes ==
- 29 April 1962, John Galsworthy's Loyalties, a tale of upper class anti-semitism, with Peter Wyngarde as Ferdinand de Levis, Keith Michell as Dancy, Jennifer Wright as Mabel Dancy, Felix Aylmer as Canynge, David Garth as Graviter, Jack Watling as Winsor, Austin Trevor as Lord St Erth, Oliver Johnston as Twisden, Diana Hope as Lady Adela, and Geoffrey Denys as Treisure.
