= Fred M. Jones =

Jamaican planter, philanthropist and Custos of Portland (1890–1971)

The Honourable Fred M. Jones OBE JP
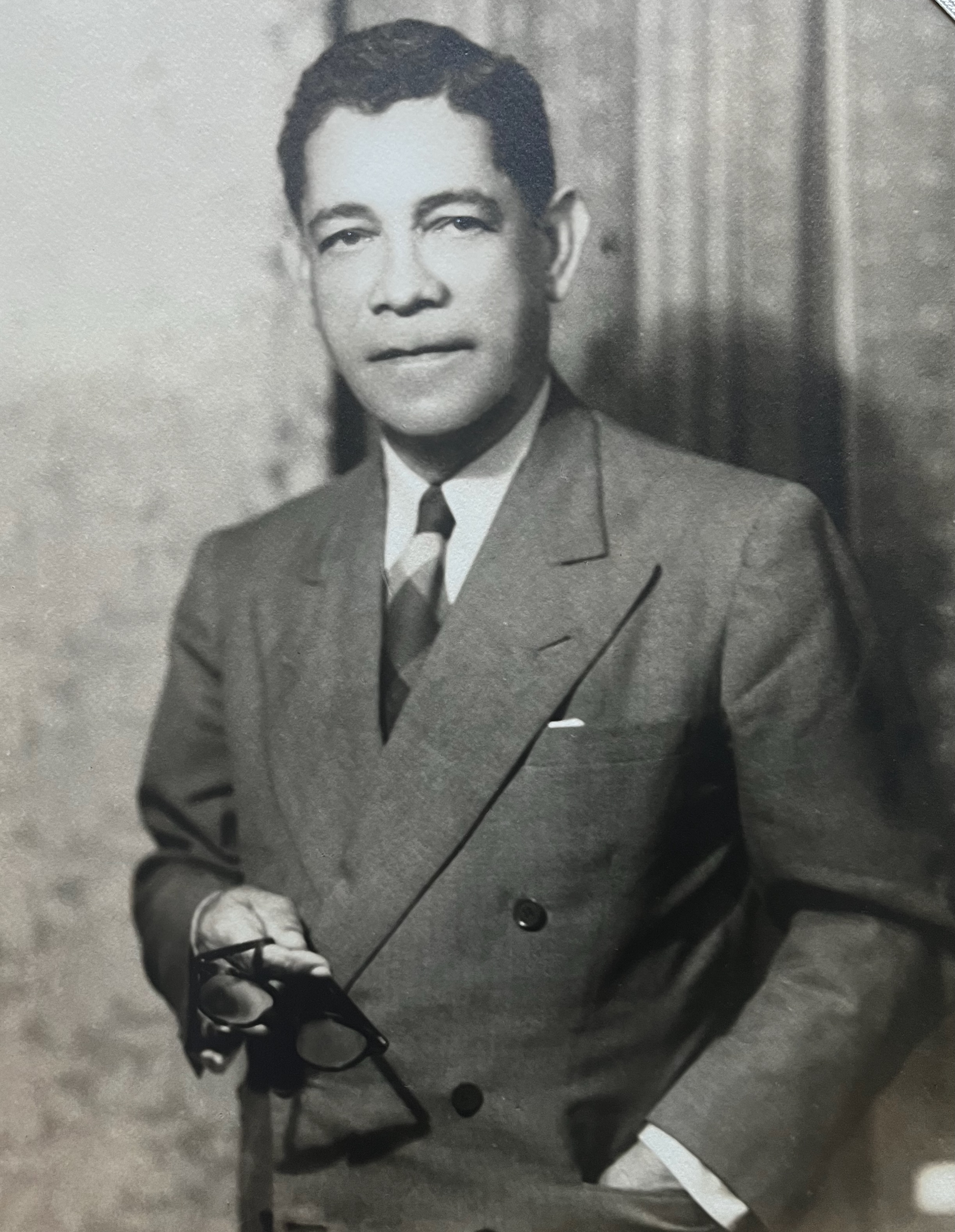
- Jones, c. 1930

Custos Rotulorum of Portland
- In office September 1965 – December 1971
- Monarch: Elizabeth II
- Prime Minister: Sir Alexander Bustamante; Sir Donald Sangster; Hugh Shearer
- Preceded by: F. V. Grossett
- Succeeded by: John Henry Stedman

Personal details
- Born: Frederick McDonald Jones; 29 January 1890 Portland, Colony of Jamaica, British Empire
- Died: 31 December 1971 (aged 81) Kingston, Jamaica
- Spouse: Gladys Smith (m. 1923; died 1960)
- Relations: Melissa Jones (granddaughter); Sadie Jones (granddaughter)
- Children: 7, including Kenneth and Evan
- Education: Titchfield Upper School

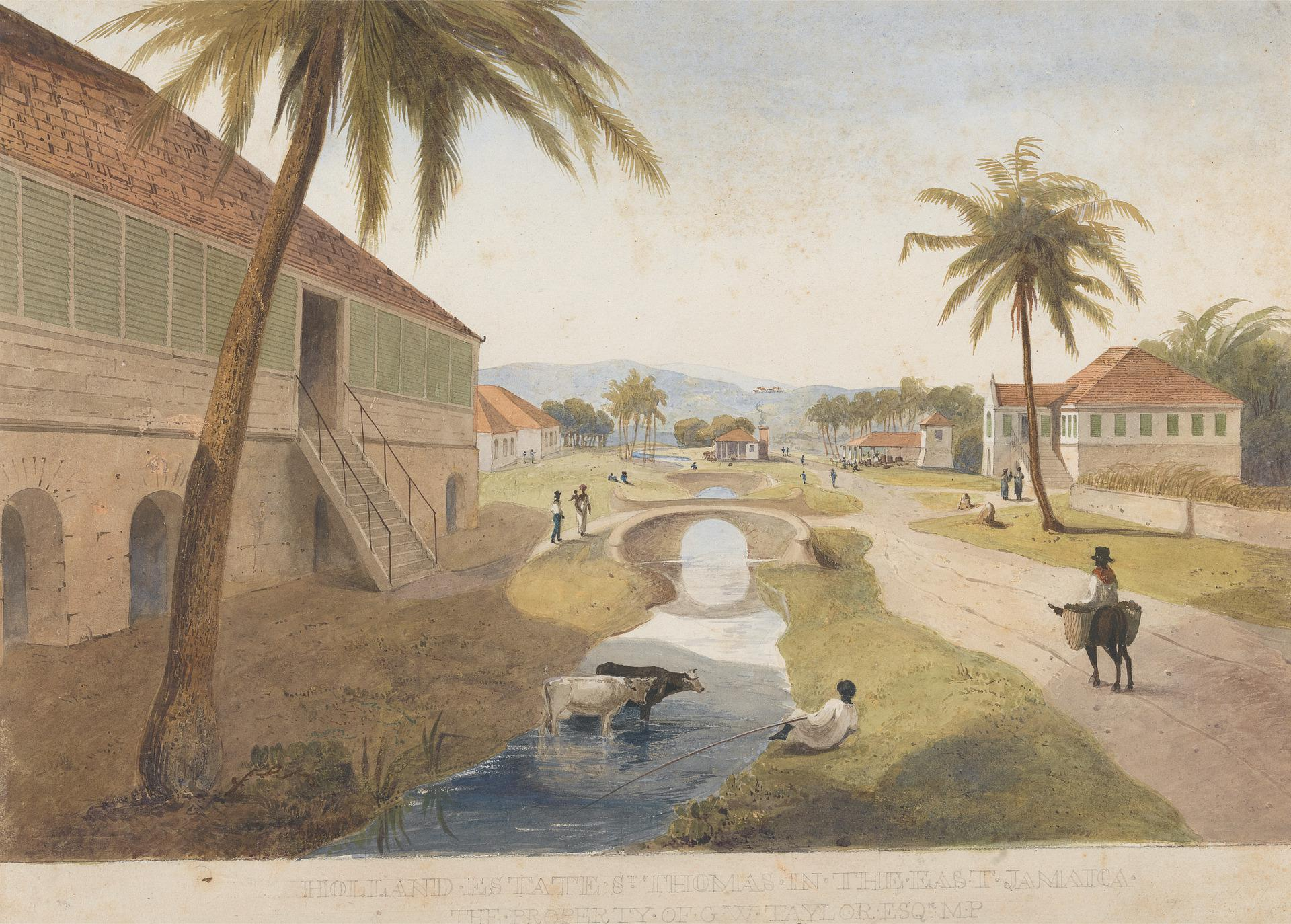

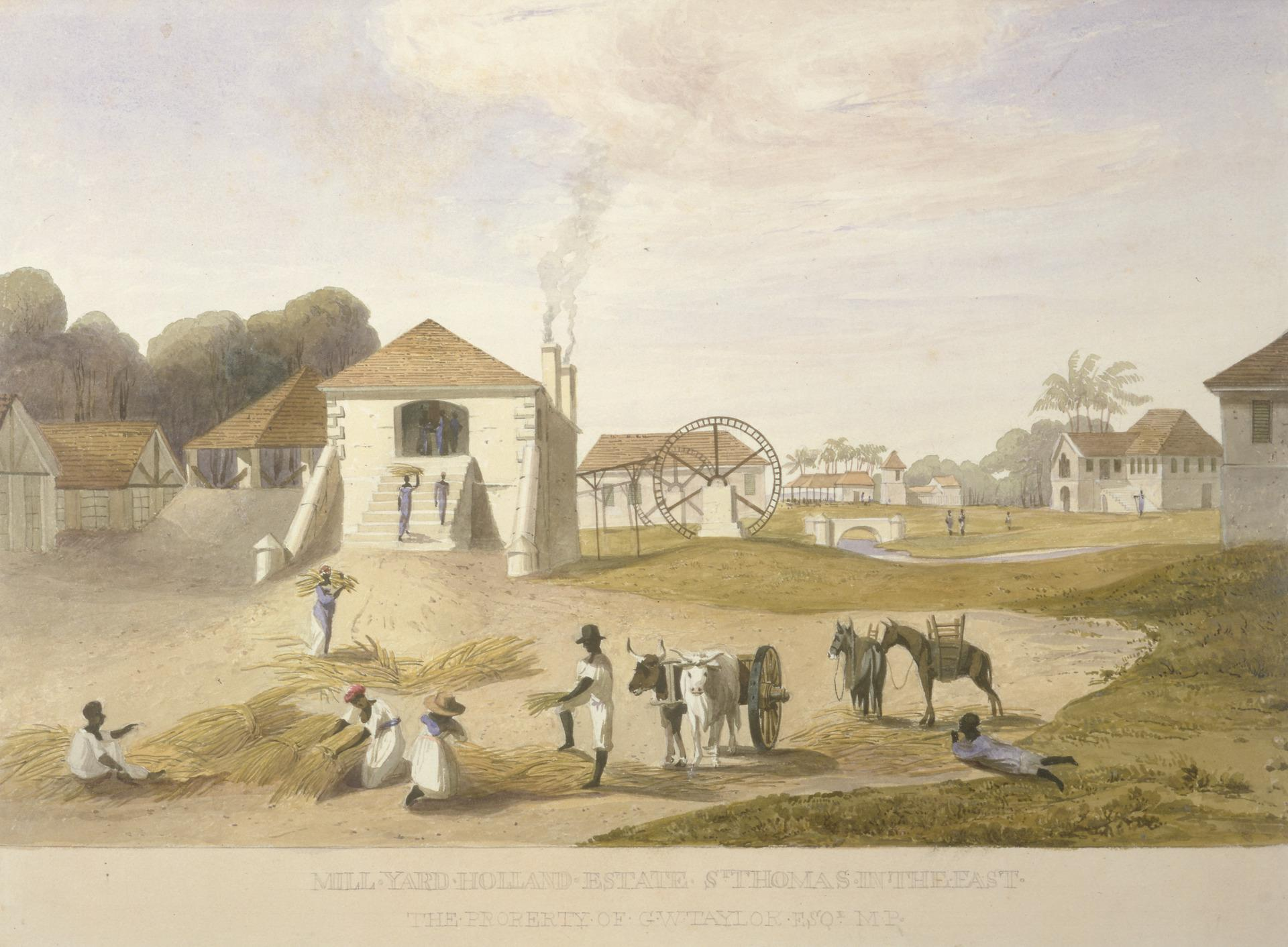
Aquatints by James Hakewill showing the barracks (above) and mill yard (below) of Holland Estate c. 1820–21, ruins of which are part of FMJ Estates.

Frederick McDonald Jones OBE JP (29 January 1890 – 31 December 1971), commonly known as Fred M. Jones, was a Jamaican planter and public figure who served as Portland's custos rotulorum from 1965 until his death. He was one of the largest individual landowners in Jamaica. He devoted much of his life to public service and philanthropy.

== Early life and family ==
The Jones family came to Portland, Jamaica, in 1842 with the Reverend Evan Jones, a Welsh clergyman who built St Thomas Anglican Church in Manchioneal. The Reverend's son, Morgan Newton Jones JP, was the proprietor of the in ruinate sugar plantation Williamsfield Estate, which he leased. He married Annie Mary Lord at his father's church in 1869; his second wife was Rosa Elizabeth (née McDonald), Fred M. Jones's mother, whom he married the year of Jones's birth.

Jones was educated at Tichfield Upper School, returning to Williamsfield in the evenings to work for his father, alongside his younger brother Henry Morgan Jones. In 1916, Henry left to join British forces in the First World War, attesting with the 237th Battalion (American Legion), CEF; swiftly being transferred to the No. 2 Construction Battalion. He was discharged in 1919, having attained the rank of sergeant.

Jones's wife was Gladys (née Smith) MBE JP, a Quaker missionary from Oskaloosa, Iowa whom he married in 1923. Gladys's mission focused on education, transforming Happy Grove School in Portland from a vocational to an academic institution. Although an Anglican, Jones took an active hand in Quaker affairs and worked alongside his wife. They had seven children, among them were the politician Kenneth and the writer Evan.

== Fred M. Jones Estates (FMJ) ==
In the early 1900s, Fred M. Jones and his brother Henry Morgan Jones grew coconuts and bananas on their father's land. By 1916, their father had died, leaving Williamsfield Estates to them jointly with Fred having powers of attorney over the property. During the 1920s and 1930s, as large American fruit companies such as United Fruit and Atlantic Fruit moved their Caribbean operations to Central America, Jones acquired their lands. He was initially denied loans for this purpose, possibly due to his mixed race. However, he was eventually granted a loan by a small building society on the western side of the island.

In 1949, Jones's company was officially registered as Fred M. Jones Estates, Ltd., of which his father's Williamsfield Estates is now a subsidiary. In 1961, a dairy was established at FMJ. At its height, FMJ covered 10,000 acres across Portland and Saint Thomas, with the majority of villagers from settlements such as Duckenfield working on the property.

As of 2019, FMJ is managed by Nicholas Jones, Jones's grandson; encompassing 5,000 acres and employing 220 people. Due to the Golden Grove Sugar Estates factory closing in 2019, FMJ transitioned from primarily producing sugarcane to cassava, which is sold to Desnoes & Geddes and used in the brewing of Red Stripe. Another recent addition to FMJ is the Holland Crocodile Sanctuary.

== Public service and philanthropy ==
In a 1965 article in The Daily Gleaner, it was written that "the Jones family has been a friend of the people over the years"; and, in 1971, that Jones himself was "one of [Portland's] most active and public spirited sons". Jones and his wife were highly involved patrons of education, and Happy Grove School's Jones Library is dedicated to them in honour of their significant contributions to the institution, with Jones donating £7,000 to facilitate its construction. Upon Gladys's death, Jones donated sufficient musical instruments to Happy Grove School to furnish the pupils with an orchestra. He also donated a medical clinic to the town of Manchioneal; and, in 1965, donated FMJ land for the building of Amity Hall Primary School.

In the 1930s and 1940s, Jones served extensively as a justice of the peace. However, he was perhaps most active as the holder of civic and agricultural board positions. During his life he was named:

- Director of the Portland Parochial Board;
- President of the Portland Citizen's Association;
- Chairman of the Banana Board;
- Vice-chairman of the Agricultural Development Corporation;
- Director of the All-Island Banana Growers Association;
- Director of the Banana Industry Insurance;
- Chairman of the Happy Grove School Board;
- Chairman of the Friends' Education Council;
- Member of the Anglican Diocesan Council;
- Member of the Diocesan Finance Council.

== Honours ==
- Jones was appointed to the Order of the British Empire, with the rank of Officer, in Queen Elizabeth II's 1963 New Year Honours "For voluntary public services".
- In 1965, Jones was appointed Custos Rotulorum of Portland by the governor-general, Sir Clifford Campbell, on the advice of Prime Minister Sir Alexander Bustamante. He replaced F. V. Grossett, who died in office. Until his appointment, it had been customary to resign the position at the age of 75, yet Jones was 75 when he took up the office.

== Personal life and death ==
According to The Times, Fred M. Jones was the first person to own a Rolls-Royce automobile in Jamaica and was a member of the Royal Jamaican Yacht Club. He died at the age of 81 in Nuttall Memorial Hospital in Kingston. Jones is depicted in his son Evan's roman à clef, Stone Haven (1993). In the novel, the character of Stanley Newton bears a strong resemblance to Jones.
