= Caribbean Quarterly =

Academic journal

- Discipline: Area studies
- Language: English
- Edited by: Kim Robinson-Walcott

Publication details
- History: 1949–present
- Publisher: Taylor & Francis
- Frequency: Quarterly

Standard abbreviations
- ISO 4: Caribb. Q.

Indexing
- ISSN: 0008-6495 (print); 2470-6302 (web)
- LCCN: 2011235739
- JSTOR: 00086495
- OCLC no.: 795997364

Links
- Journal homepage; Journal page at publisher's website; Online access; Online archive

Caribbean Quarterly is a quarterly peer-reviewed academic journal covering studies on the culture of the Caribbean, with its content comprising scholarly articles, essays, criticism, creative writing and book reviews. The journal is published for the University of the West Indies by Taylor & Francis. One of the oldest periodicals in the English-speaking Caribbean, it was established in 1949. The editor of Caribbean Quarterly is Kim Robinson-Walcott (University of the West Indies). There is an associated monograph series.

According to Luz Rodríguez-Carranza and Nadia Lie, writing in A History of Literature in the Caribbean: "Without a doubt, Caribbean Quarterly (CQ) and Casa de las Américas (CA) are among the most prestigious cultural magazine that have existed (and still exist) in the Caribbean."
