= James Lansdale Hodson =

British novelist, scriptwriter and journalist (1891–1956)

James Lansdale Hodson OBE (1891–1956) was a British novelist, scriptwriter and journalist. He was a war correspondent and northern editor of the Daily Mail.

Born in Bury, Lancashire in 1891, Hodson worked as a war correspondent during World War II, and he wrote a war diary that was published by Victor Gollancz as a series of 7 books; Through the Dark Night, Towards the Morning, Before Daybreak, 'War in the Sun, Home Front, And Yet I Like America and The Sea and the Land. He also wrote the official British film Desert Victory. He toured the United States from 1943-44, writing And Yet I Like America on his return. His 1952 novel Morning Star had as its theme the freedom of the press in England. His novel Return To The Wood (1955) became a play Hamp (by John Wilson) and then a film King & Country (1964, directed by Joseph Losey and starring Dirk Bogarde).

He died aged 65 on 28 August 1956 at Lewisham Hospital.
