= Jamaica Journal =

- Discipline: Jamaican studies
- Language: English
- Edited by: Kim Robinson-Walcott

Publication details
- Former name: Journal of the Institute of Jamaica
- History: 1896–present
- Publisher: Institute of Jamaica (Jamaica)
- Frequency: Biannual

Standard abbreviations
- ISO 4: Jam. J.

Indexing
- ISSN: 0021-4124
- LCCN: 75027862
- OCLC no.: 01797964

Links
- Journal homepage; Online access at the Digital Library of the Caribbean

The Jamaica Journal is a peer-reviewed academic journal published by the Institute of Jamaica. It publishes scholarly articles on the history, natural history, art, literature, music, and culture of Jamaica.

Its predecessor was the Journal of the Institute of Jamaica, established in 1896. In 1967, the Jamaica Journal was established as a quarterly journal, "to reflect the Institute's interest in the development and promotion of Jamaica's history, literature, science and arts". In 2002, the journal temporarily ceased publication; it was relaunched in 2004 under a new editor-in-chief, Kim Robinson-Walcott.

== Abstracting and indexing ==
The journal is abstracted and indexed in America: History and Life, Historical Abstracts, International Bibliography of the Social Sciences, and the Modern Language Association Database.
