= Yves Thériault =

Canadian novelist (1915–1983)

Yves Thériault OC
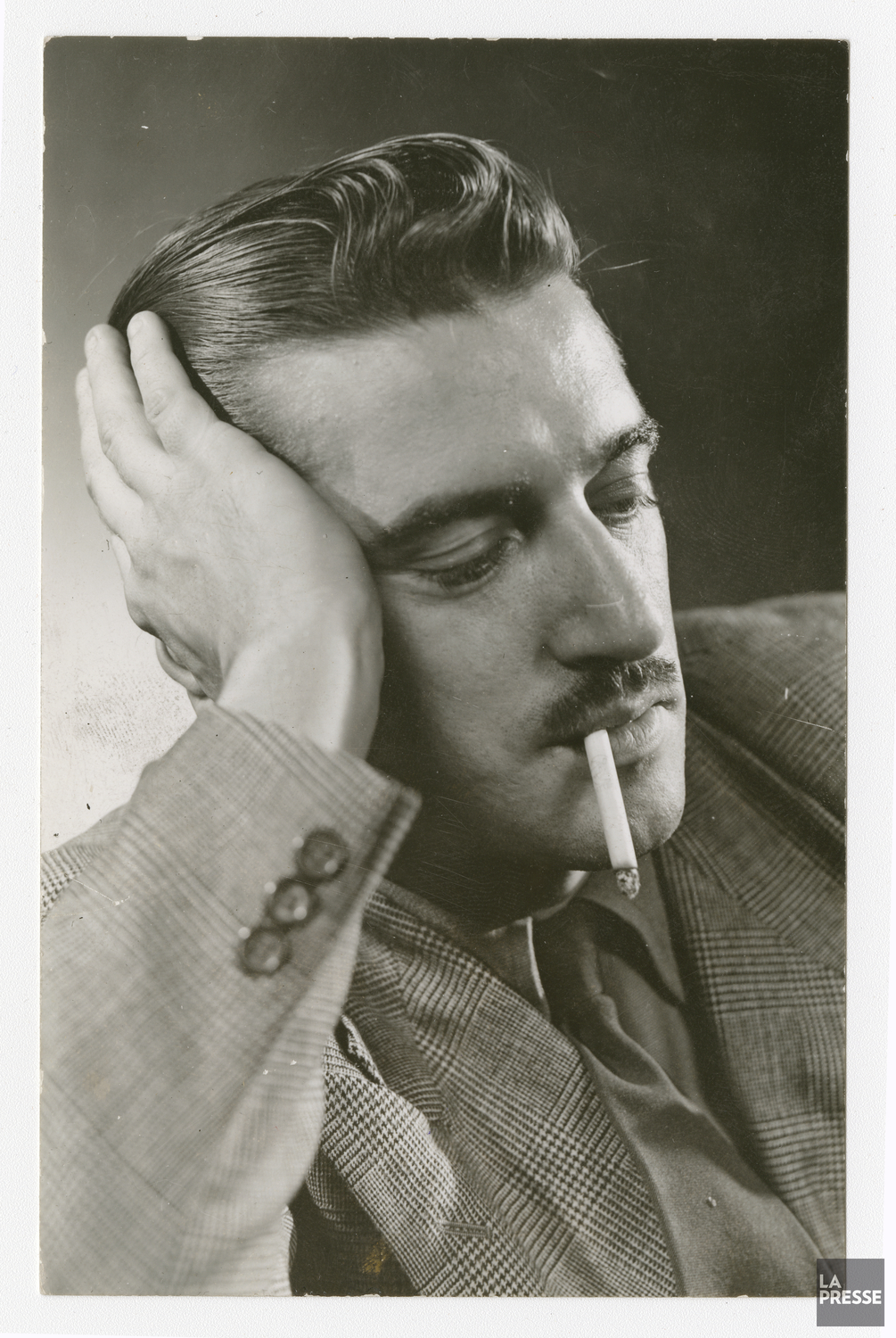
- Thériault in 1948
- Born: 27 November 1915; Quebec City, Quebec, Canada
- Died: 20 October 1983 (aged 67)
- Other name: Benoît Tessier
- Education: Notre-Dame-de-Grâce School; Mont-Saint-Louis College

Yves Thériault OC (November 27, 1915 – October 20, 1983) was a Canadian author.

He was born in Quebec City to Alcide and Aurore (Nadeau) Thériault. On April 21, 1942, he married Germaine Blanchet, with whom he had two children, Marie-José and Yves-Michel. As a child he dropped out of school at the age of 15, holding many miscellaneous jobs until he became a known writer.

Perhaps his best-known work is Agaguk, a story of cultural conflict between Inuit and white men, published in 1958.

In 1975, he was made an Officer of the Order of Canada in recognition for being "one of the most prolific writers and best-known novelists in Canada".

He was a member of the Canadian Authors Association, the International PEN Club, le syndicat national des Écrivains de France, la Société des Gens de Lettres (Paris), la Société des écrivains canadiens, and la Société des auteurs Dramatiques.

== Selected works ==
- Contes pour un homme seul - 1944
- La Fille Laide- 1950
- Le Dompteur d'ours - 1950
- Les Vendeurs du Temple - 1953
- Aaron - 1954, reprinted for Paris distribution in 1956.
- Agaguk - 1958, printed for Paris distribution as well, translated into German, Italian, Portuguese, Japanese and Spanish in 1959.
- Ashini - 1961, received the Governor General's Award for French Language Fiction.
- Cul-de-sac, Institut littéraire du Québec, Québec, 1961; Les Quinze (collection 10/10), Montréal, 1981
