= Kim Robinson-Walcott =

Jamaican poet and editor (born 1956)

- Born: 1956 (age 69–70)
- Education: McGill University; University College London; University of the West Indies
- Occupations: Poet and editor
- Notable work: Out of Order! (2006)

Kimberly-Ann Robinson-Walcott (born 1956) is a Jamaican poet and editor. She has been the editor-in-chief of the Jamaica Journal since 2004 and editor-in-chief of the Caribbean Quarterly since 2010. Robinson-Walcott is the author of a study of the white Jamaican novelist Anthony Winkler, titled Out of Order! (2006).

== Biography ==
Robinson-Walcott was born in 1956 and earned a bachelor's degree in English from McGill University in 1977. In 1979, she earned a master's degree in town planning from University College London. She earned her PhD in English from the University of the West Indies (UWI) in 2001. She married Harclyde Walcott and had two children, Miles and Sidney.

== Work ==
In 1981, Robinson-Walcott began her career as the director of editing for Kingston Publishing but left in 1986. Until 1994, she was the strategic planning director of Kingston Restoration Company, planning the renovation of historic properties in Kingston. That year, she started her own publishing consulting business, Editors Ink, and returned to Kingston Publishers as the director of editing, focusing her work on children's books and fiction. In 2000, she became the book editor at the Sir Arthur Lewis Institute of Social and Economic Studies, UWI, and continued in that post for a decade.

Robinson-Walcott became the editor-in-chief of the Jamaica Journal, the primary publication of the Institute of Jamaica in 2004. Her work there focused on gathering contemporary scholarly work on the arts, history, medicine and science from colleagues at the University of the West Indies and sharing those with the public. Issues might focus on a mix biographical studies of essential figures in Jamaican history, dancehall culture, sculpture, medicinal plants, historic landmarks, aerial photography, as well as book reviews and other topics.

Robinson-Walcott's book Out of Order! (2006) was called "a brilliant exercise in literary criticism" by Caribbean Quarterly. The book examines the work of the white Jamaican novelist Anthony Winkler. It discusses the issue of race in the Caribbean and his work. The Jamaica Gleaner called it "A smart and crackling engagement with West Indian whiteness." Robinson-Walcott knew Winkler personally and he has said that she "discovered" him. In addition, she was his first editor.

Robinson-Walcott has also done work on John Hearne and challenged his placement in the canon of Caribbean literature. She wrote the introduction for the short-story collection John Hearne's Short Fiction. She has been a fixture on the cultural lecture circuit, giving many presentations on important figures in Jamaica's history and cultural acquisitions, such as Anthony Winkler's archive.

In October 2010, Robinson-Walcott became the editor-in-chief of Caribbean Quarterly, simultaneously continuing her work with the Jamaica Journal. She also writes poetry.

== Selected bibliography ==
- Out of Order! : Anthony Winkler and white West Indian writing. UWI Press. 2006. ISBN 9789766401726.
