= Huckabee College of Architecture =

Architecture school at Texas Tech University

- Established: 1927
- Dean: Upe Flueckiger
- Faculty: 46
- Students: 602
- Undergraduates: 495
- Postgraduates: 107
- Location: Lubbock, Texas, U.S. 33.580720°N 101.880664°W
- Website: www.arch.ttu.edu

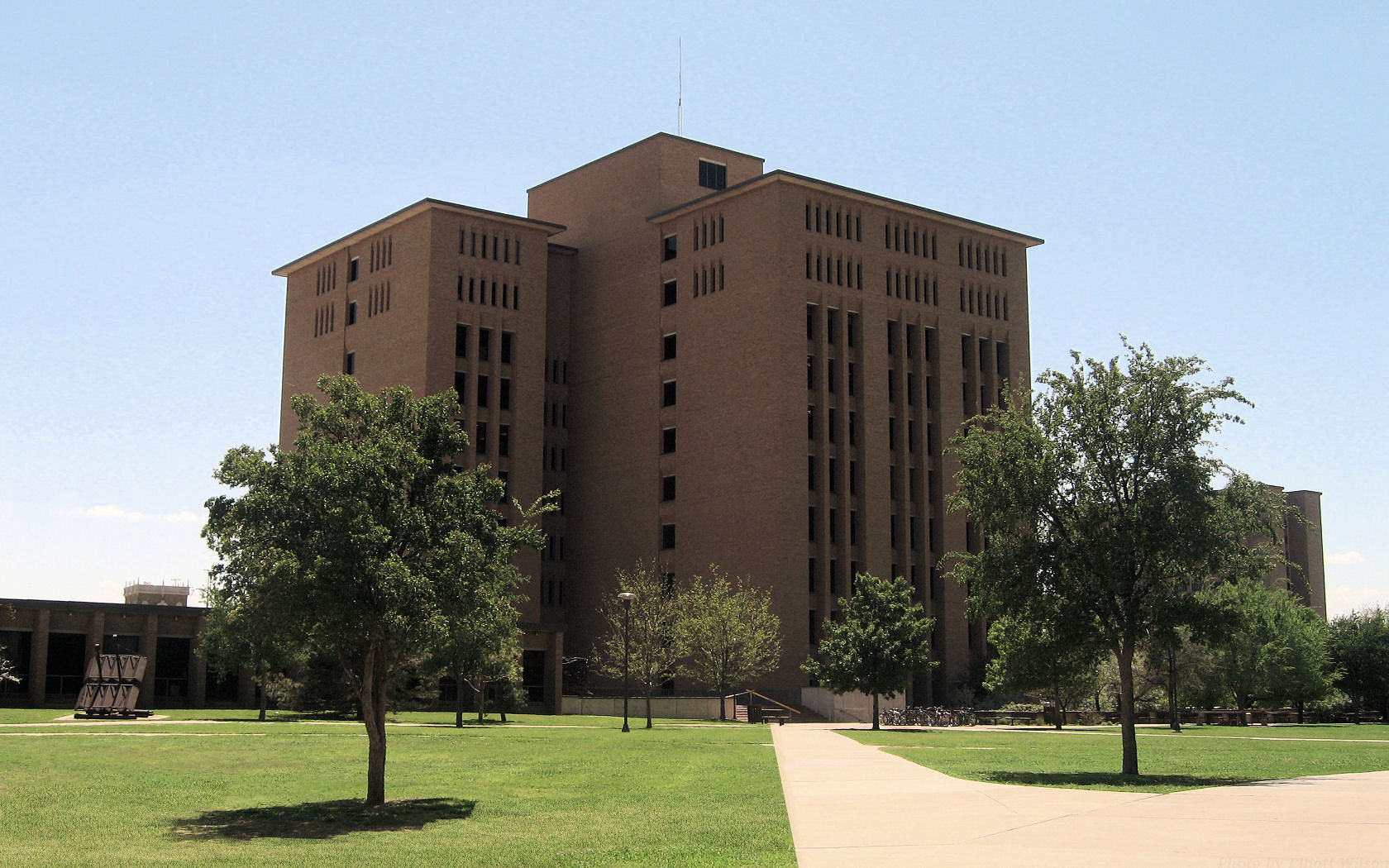
Architecture Building

Texas Tech University College of Architecture is the college of architecture at Texas Tech University in Lubbock, Texas. The architecture program has existed at Texas Tech University since 1927. Texas Tech's Master of Architecture is a professional degree and it is accredited by the National Architectural Accrediting Board (NAAB). On November 30, 2022, the school announced it would be named the Huckabee College of Architecture.

== History ==
Texas Tech University first offered architecture education in 1927 within the College of Engineering. The emphasis of the program was advanced construction and mechanical equipment of buildings. Four years later the architecture program transformed into the Department of Architecture and Allied Arts and it emphasis expanded from engineering and structures to design. In 1933, the department offered its first Bachelor of Architecture degree, a program that the next year would be expanded to a five-year degree. By 1957 the program was accredited with the National Architectural Accrediting Board, and has been continuously accredited since then.

In 1971 the department moved to its current building and in 1975 the board of regents designated the architecture program as the Division of Architecture. Eleven years later, the division of architecture would become an independent college. The State Coordinating Board first approved the program's Master of Architecture degree in 1985, and in 1992 the Master of Architecture professional degree program was awarded a full five-year accreditation. The College of Architecture became the first architecture education program to offer a 173 credit hour Master of Architecture professional degree in 1996.

Currently, the Huckabee College of Architecture offers a Bachelor of Science in Architecture (B.S. Arch) consists of 124 credit hours of undergraduate courses. The M.Arch program is a 4 + 2-year program (60 hours of graduate coursework). This is a professional degree and graduates can sit for their licensing exam (ARE).

== Notable people ==
=== Faculty ===
Name	Department	Notability	Joined TTU	Left/retired	Alumnus/na?	Refs
Upe Flueckiger	Architecture	Recognized for the design of the Flueckiger Residence.	1998	(Active)	no	
Hendrika Buelinckx	Architecture	Winner of the President's Excellence in Teaching award.	1995	(Active)	UCLA	

== Lecture Series ==
"The Texas Tech Huckabee College of Architecture Lecture Series aims to create and explore a discourse on topics ranging from the built environment, creative and innovative scholarship, to current issues taking place in our society. The series features lectures from architects, theorists, scholars, and educators exploring, expanding, and uncovering new ground for the discipline of Architecture. TTU CoA Lectures Series is supported by the Dean's Funds for Excellence."

=== 2021-2022 ===
Lubbock Lecturers

- Kuo Pao Lian and Pavlina Ilieva, co-founders of PI.KL
- Dawn Finley, founding principal of Interloop—Architecture, Professor of Architecture and the Director of Graduate Studies at Rice University School of Architecture
- Gary Cunningham, founder and president of Cunningham Architects
- Neeraj Bhatia, founder of The Open Workshop
- Charles L. Davis II, Associate Professor of Architectural History and Criticism at the University at Buffalo
- Viola Ago, director MIRACLES Architecture, School of Architecture and Urban Design at UCLA
- Chris Cornelius, founding principal of studio:indigenous and Chair of the Department of Architecture at the University of New Mexico
- Ted Flato, Founding Partner at Lake|Flato Architects

El Paso Lecturers

- Paola Aguirre, founder of Borderless
- Jorge Ambrosi and Gabriela Etchegaray, founders AMBROSI | ETCHEGARAY, Adjunct Professors at GSAPP, Columbia University
- Anna Puigjaner, co-founder MAIO, Associate Professor of Professional Practice at Columbia GSAPP
- Alvin Huang, founder, SDA | Synthesis Design + Architecture, Director and Associate Professor at USC Architecture
- Dana Cupkova, co-Founder & design director, EPIPHYTE Lab, Professor at Carnegie Mellon University

=== 2020-2021 ===
- Germane Barnes, Assistant Professor and the Director of The Community, Housing & Identity Lab at the University of Miami
- Shawhin Roudbari, Assistant Professor Environmental Design, University of Colorado Boulder; Member of Dissent by Design
- Sekou Cooke, Assistant Professor of Architecture, Syracuse University
- Alice Tseng, Department Chair and Professor of History of Art and Architecture at Boston University
- Lydia Kallipoliti, Assistant Professor at the Cooper Union
- Fernanda Canales, founder Fernanda Canales Arquitectura
- Kathryn Dean, founder, Dean/Wolf Architects
- V. Mitch McEwen, founding principal at Atelier Office, Assistant Professor of Architecture, Princeton University
- Molly Wright Steenson, Senior Associate Dean for Research in the College of Fine Arts & Associate Professor, School of Design, Carnegie Mellon University
- Esra Akcan, Michael McCarthy Professor in the Department of Architecture, Director of IES at the Einaudi Center for International Studies at Cornell University.
- Billie Tsien, co-founder Tod Williams Billie Tsien Architects, Charles Gwathmey Professor in Practice, Yale Architecture
- Hsinming Fung, principal and co-founder, Hodgetts + Fung, Professor, Sci_Arc Design Studio

=== 2019-2020 ===
Lubbock Lecturers

- Dora Epstein Jones, Texas Tech University College of Architecture
- José Aragüez, Columbia GSAPP
- Maria Hurtado de Mendoza Wahrolen, co-founder of estudio_entresitio, Associate Professor of Architecture, NJIT
- Thom Mayne, founding partner, Morphosis
- Leslie Lok & Sassa Sisvkoic, co founders at HANNAH, Assistant Professors, Cornell University
- Andrew Zago, principal at Zago Architecture, Clinical Professor at the University of Illinois at Chicago
- Noémie Despland-Lichtert and Brendan Shea, co-founders Roundhouse Platform
- Neil Spiller, founding Director of the AVATAR (Advanced Virtual and Technological Architectural Research) Group, editor of AD
- Jeffrey S. Nesbit, founding director of the research group Grounding Design

El Paso Lecturers

- Errol Barron, founding partner of Errol Barron/Michael Toups Architects, Professor of Architecture at Tulane University
- Tatiana Bilbao, founder and principal, Tatiana Bilbao Estudio
- Ila Berman, Elwood R. Quesada Professor in Architecture, University of Virginia

=== 2018-2019 ===
Lubbock Lecturers

- Chip Lord
- Neyran Turan, partner at NEMESTUDIO and Assistant Professor of Architecture at the UC-Berkeley
- Alejandro Zaera-Polo, principal at AZPML
- Jonathan Solomon, Director of Architecture, Interior Architecture & Designed Objects School of the Art Institute of Chicago
- Gabriela Carrillo, principal at TALLER
- Cade Hayes & Jesus Robles, Jr., founders of DUST

El Paso Lecturers

- Kathryn Dean, founder, Dean/Wolf Architects
- Andrés Jaque, Associate Professor of Professional Practice at Columbia GSAPP
- Felipe Correa, Vincent and Eleanor Shea Professor and Chair of the Department of Architecture at the University of Virginia
- Sarah Whiting, founder of WW, Dean of Rice University School of Architecture
- Luis Carranza, Professor at Roger Williams University
- René Davids, Davids Killory Architecture, Professor of Architecture and Urban Design at UC Berkeley

=== 2017-2018 ===
Lubbock Lecturers

- Marlon Blackwell
- Jose Castillo, founder and principal of A|911
- Carlos Jiménez, Carlos Jiménez Studio
- Merrill Elam, principal of Mack Scogin Merril Elam Architects
- Hillary Sample & Michael Meredith, principals MOS Architects
- Keller Easterling, Enid Storm Dwyer Professor and Director of the MED Program at Yale University
- Preston Scott Cohen
- Meredith Miller and Ellie Abrons
- Sharon Johnston, Johnston Marklee & Associates
- Cristiane Muniz, Una Arquitetos
- Neeraj Bhatia

El Paso Lecturers

- Frida Escobedo
- Alvaro Rodriguez
- Ronald Rael & Virginia San Fratello
