= Michael Sorkin bibliography =

- Books↙: 9
- Articles↙: 77
- Poems↙: 1
- Interviews↙: 1
- Books edited↙: 9
- Introductions↙: 14
- Reviews↙: 29
- Afterwords↙: 2
- Designs↙: 14
- Speeches↙: 2

The bibliography of Michael Sorkin includes criticism, essays, and non-fiction books written by the American architect and professor of urban design Michael Sorkin. Sorkin was a prolific writer on topics related to architectural and urban design and theory from the postmodern period until his death in 2020, during which he regularly contributed to numerous periodicals. Sorkin's non-fiction architectural and urban criticism constitutes the majority of his work, but his bibliography also features diverse items such as early journalistic work and poetry.

== Books (as author) ==
Title	Publication Year	Publisher
Not the Webster's Dictionary	1983	Wallaby
Exquisite Corpse: Writing on Buildings	1991	Verso
Local Code: The Constitution of a City at 42º N Latitude	1993	Princeton Architectural Press
Michael Sorkin Studio: Wiggle	1998	The Monacelli Press
Other Plans: University of Chicago Studies, 1998-2000	2001	Princeton Architectural Press
Starting from Zero: Reconstructing Downtown New York	2003	Routledge
Twenty Minutes in Manhattan	2009	Reaktion Books
All Over the Map: Writing on Buildings and Cities	2011	Verso
Two Hundred and Fifty Things an Architect Should Know	2021	Princeton Architectural Press

== Books (as editor) ==
Title	Publication Year	Publisher
Hardy Holzman Pfeiffer	1981	Whitney Library of Design
Variations on a Theme Park: The New American City and the End of Public Space	1992	The Noonday Press
Giving Ground: The Politics of Propinquity	1999	Verso
After the World Trade Center: Rethinking New York City	2002	Routledge
The Next Jerusalem: Sharing the Divided City	2002	The Monacelli Press
Against the Wall: Israel's Barrier to Peace	2005	The New Press
Indefensible Space: The Architecture of the National Insecurity State	2008	Routledge
New Orleans Under Reconstruction: The Crisis of Planning	2014	Verso
Beyond Petropolis: Designing a Practical Utopia in Nueva Loja	2015	Oscar Riera Ojeda Publishers

== Essays and articles ==
In Books
Title	Publication	Publication Year	Publisher
Et In Arcadia Emilio	Emilio Ambasz: The Poetics of the Pragmatic	1988	Rizzoli International Publications
Ciao Manhattan	New York Architecture: 1970 to 1990	1989	Rizzoli International Publications
Nineteen Millennial Mantras	Architecture in Transition: Between Deconstruction and New Modernsim	1991	Prestel
Local Code	LAX: The Los Angeles Experiment	1994	SITES
The Measure of Comfort	Comfort: Reclaiming Place in a Virtual World	2001	Cleveland Center for Contemporary Art
The Avant-garde in Time of War	The State of Architecture at the Beginning of the 21st Century	2003	The Monacelli Press
More or Less	The HOME House Project: The Future of Affordable Housing	2004	The MIT Press
With the Grain	Whereabouts: New Architecture with Local Identities	2004	The Monacelli Press
Deputy City	Urban Ecology: Detroit and Beyond	2005	Map Book Publishers
-	Here Is Tijuana!	2006	Black Dog Publishing
The Bounding Mayne	Morphosis 1998–2004	2006	Rizzoli International Publications
The Great Mall of New York	The Suburbanization of New York: Is the Wold's Greatest City Becoming Just Another Town?	2007	Princeton Architectural Press
What's the Difference?	Architecture: Celebrating the Past, Designing the Future	2008	Visual Reference Publications
The Plot Against Architecture	Philip Johnson: The Constancy of Change	2009	Yale University Press
NYU's Tipping Point	While We Were Sleeping: NYU and the Destruction of New York	2012	McNally Jackson Books
Introduction: Traffic in Democracy	The People, Place, and Space Reader	2014	Routledge
Drawn to Life	My Book - Svein Tønsager: Cracks, Hinges and Xfoliations	2020	Architectural Publisher B

In Periodicals
Title	Year	Publication
Down with False Messiahs	1972	Architectural Association Quarterly
A Radical Alternative	1972	Architectural Record
Robert Venturi and the Function of Architecture at the Present Time	1974	Architectural Association Quarterly
The Architect: A New American Movie Hero	1975	Architectural Association Quarterly
On the Hegemony of the Ersatz	1981	Progressive Architecture
Raiders of the "Tilted Arc"	1985	In These Times
Leaving Wright Enough Alone	1986	Architectural Record
Dwelling Machines	1987	Design Quarterly
The Uncertain Status of Being Stern	1986	SPY
Cheesed Off	1987	SPY
Court Jesting	1987	SPY
Where Was Philip?	1988	SPY
See You in Disneyland	1992	Design Quarterly
Cartoon Cities	1992	I.D.
Noted with Pleasure	1992	Progressive Architecture
Perspectives: Meeting Spaces	1993	Progressive Architecture
Hyper Growth in South China: From the Pearl River Delta to Shanghai	1997	Architectural Record
America's Most Visited Houses	1998	Architectural Record
Eleven Tasks for Urban Design	1998	Perspecta: The Yale Architecture Journal
Splitsville, U.S.A.: Why the Practice and Teaching of Urban Design Is Coming Apart	2002	Architectural Record
Confessions of a Competition Junkie, and Why It May Be Time to Kick the Habit	2003	Architectural Record
Of Dolphins, Comedy, and Architecture: Remembering Doug Michels and Ant Farm	2003	Architectural Record
Of Landmarks and Memorials: Getting Mad (and MAD) about All the Wrong Things	2004	Architectural Record
Advice to Critics	2004	ARCADE
Limping Our Way to Universal Design: Everything Looks Different on Crutches	2004	Architectural Record
In a City Whose Political Terrain Is Treacherous, a Gehry Project Comes Up Against a Wall	2004	Architectural Record
When Good Architects Design Bad Buildings: Beauty Trumps Ethics	2004	Architectural Record
Finding an Open Space for the Exercise of Democracy in New York's Dense Urban Fabric	2004	Architectural Record
Entering the Building	2004	Perspecta: The Yale Architecture Journal
After the Flood: Rebuilding the Physical and Social Fabric	2005	Architectural Record
People Who Live in Urban Glass Houses ... Play It Safe	2005	Architectural Record
What Can You Say about the Pritzker?	2005	Perspecta: The Yale Architecture Journal
Ten Better Places for a Football Stadium	2005	The Architect's Newspaper
Will New Plans for the Gulf Drown It Again, This Time in Nostalgia?	2006	Architectural Record
Guilt by Association: Political Expression and Architecture	2006	Architectural Record
Jane Jacobs: Fighting Back Until the Very End	2006	Architectural Record
Hollowing Out the Middle: What's Lost When a Housing Enclave Is Sold	2006	Architectural Record
Jane Jacobs Dies at 89	2006	The Architect's Newspaper
Can Robert Moses Be Rehabilitated for a New Era of Building?	2007	Architectural Record
Can an Indigenous Culture Survive in a Jungle Petropolis?	2007	Architectural Record
Big Brother Hitches a Ride with a Congestion-Pricing Scheme	2007	Architectural Record
Legal Loophole Trumps Good Zoning in SoHo	2007	Architectural Record
Making (Too) Big Plans for Manhattan's West Side	2008	Architectural Record
Bucky Lives! Why Fuller Matters More Today Than Ever Before	2008	Architectural Record
Some Suggestions on How to Spend $800 Billion	2009	Architectural Record
Temporary Openings in the City Fabric Tempt a Critic to Imagine	2009	Architectural Record
Connect the Dots: Dubai, Labor, Urbanism, Sustainability, and the Education of Architects	2009	Architectural Record
Smoke and Mirrors	2011	Architectural Record
Learning the Hard Way	2012	Architectural Record
How Green Is My City?: The State of Sustainable Urbanism	2012	Landscape Architecture Magazine
Bridge Over Troubled Waters	2014	Architectural Record
The Architect's Dilemma: When to Say No	2014	Architectural Record
Love Thy Neighbor(hood)	2014	Items
Time to Welcome Woonerfs	2014	Oculus
The Phantom Menace	2015	Architectural Record
Too Rich, Too Skinny	2015	Architectural Record
Parametrics and Power	2016	Architectural Record
Pinkwashing Zion Square	2016	The Architect's Newspaper
The Autonomobile and the City	2017	Architectural Record
Sauve qui peut	2018	Oculus
Certain Regulations Pertaining to Public Space in The City	2018	Positions

== Forewords, introductions, and prefaces ==
Title	Type	Publication	Publication Year	Publisher
This Side of Paradigms	Introduction	Hardy Holzman Pfeiffer	1981	Whitney Library of Design
-	Preface	Hardy Holzman Pfeiffer Associates: Buildings and Projects 1967–1992	1992	Rizzoli International Publications
Traffic in Democracy	Introduction	Giving Ground: The Politics of Propinquity	1999	Verso
Up Against the Wall	Introduction	Against the Wall: Israel's Barrier to Peace	2005	The New Press
-	Introduction	John Howey Associates: Selected and Current Works	2006	Images Publishing
Saratoga Springs!	Introduction	Saratoga	2009	ORO Editions
What Does the City Want?	Introduction	By the City/For the city: An Atlas of Possibility for the Future of New York	2011	Multi-Story Books
-	Foreword	The Architecture of Change: Building a Better World	2013	University of New Mexico Press
Who Is Aragonés?	Foreword	Miguel Ángel Aragonés	2013	Rizzoli International Publications
-	Foreword	Humanitarian Architecture: 15 Stories of Architects Working after Natural Disasters	2014	Routledge
-	Introduction	New Orleans Under Reconstruction: The Crisis of Planning	2014	Verso
-	Preface	Beyond Petropolis: Designing a Practical Utopia in Nueva Loja	2015	Oscar Riera Ojeda Publishers
Welcome to Petropolis	Introduction	Beyond Petropolis: Designing a Practical Utopia in Nueva Loja	2015	Oscar Riera Ojeda Publishers
Intransigent Spaces	Foreword	Transient Spaces	2019	Bernard and Anne Spitzer School of Architecture

== Afterwords and Epilogues ==
Title	Publication	Publication Year	Publisher
Everybody's a Critic	Architectural Criticism and Journalism: Global Perspectives	2006	Umberto Allemandi & C.
Architecture Without Capitalism	Architecture and Capitalism: 1845 to the Present	2014	Routledge

== Reviews ==
Title	Year	Publisher	Subject
Litany of Crisis	1974	Architectural Association Quarterly	The International Urban Crisis by Thomas L. Blair (1974)
Anguished Interiors No Joke	1978	In These Times	Interiors (1978)
Bunker Hill Mentality	1981	Arts and Architecture	1980 Bunker Hill development competition
YWCA	1981	Arts and Architecture	Houston YWCA Downtown Branch
Anderson Hall Expansion	1981	Arts and Architecture	Anderson Hall Expansion at Rice University
Critique	1982	Arts and Architecture	Los Angeles County Museum of Art addition by Hardy Holzman Pfeiffer
A House of Illusions	1983	House & Garden	Private California residence by William Adams
-	1983	Vanity Fair	Vietnam: A Television History (1983)
A Masterful Meeting	1984	House & Garden	Morris Greenwald House addition by Peter L. Gluck
Skidmore, Owings and Merrill	1984	Design Book Review	SOM: Skidmore, Owings and Merrill, Architecture and Urbanism 1973-1983 by Albert Bush-Brown (1984)
A Light in the Forest	1985	House & Garden	Bagley Wright House by Arthur Erickson
The Phoenix Show	1985	Arts and Architecture	Phoenix: An International Exhibition of New Design Works at 49th Parallel gallery
The Real Thing	1986	Architectural Record	The Crescent by Philip Johnson and John Burgee
-	1986	Architectural Record	Mask of Medusa edited by Kim Shkapich (1985)
A Bunch of White Guys (and Three Japanese) Sitting Around Talking or The Three PPP (A Parody)	1986	Design Book Review	The Charlottesville Tapes (1985)
Canticles for Mike	1987	AA Files	Temple Island Exhibition by Michael Webb
The Garden in the Machine	1987	Design Book Review	Ford Foundation by Kevin Roche
The Light House	1988	House & Garden	23 Beekman Place by Paul Rudolph
Child of the Times	1988	House & Garden	Gaetano Pesce Exhibition at Max Protetch Gallery and Modern Times Again Exhibition at Steelcase Design Partnership
The Holocaust Museum: Between Beauty and Horror	1993	Progressive Architecture	United States Holocaust Memorial Museum by James Ingo Freed
Can Williams and Tsien's Phoenix Art Museum Help This Sprawling Desert City Find Its Edge?	1997	Architectural Record	Phoenix Art Museum by Tod Williams Billie Tsien Architects
-	1997	Architectural Record	AIA 1997 Honors & Awards Interiors Winners
Riff on Rem: Sorkin's Take on Multinational Style	2002	Architectural Record	Prada New York by Rem Koolhaas
Let a Thousand Flowers Bloom: Cuban Modernism's Short Moment in the Revolution's Sun	2004	Architectural Record	Architecture and Revolution in Cuba Exhibition and Storefront for Art and Architecture
Making an Exception in a Place Better Known for Consensus and Fitting In	2005	Architectural Record	National Museum of the American Indian by Douglas Cardinal
Strolling through Tokyo's Hothouse of Architectural Wonders	2008	Architectural Record	Omotesandō
Rumble in the Urban Jungle	2013	Architectural Record	Landscape Urbanism and its Discontents by Andrés Duany and Emily Talen (2013)
Different Roads to Urbanization	2016	Architectural Record	Beyond the City by Felipe Correa (2016) and Dragons in Diamond Village by David Bandurski (2016)
-	2017	The Architect's Newspaper	The National Museum of African American History and Culture by David Adjaye

== Designs ==
Title	Year	Publication
-	1981	Architectural Drawing
Moon over Magenta	1981	Progressive Architecture
-	1990	Mondo Materialis: Materials and Ideas for the Future
Protecting Architectural Heritage in Expanding Metropolises	2000	Historic Cities and Sacred Sites: Cultural Roots for Urban Futures
A Plan for East Jerusalem	2002	The Next Jerusalem: Sharing the Divided City
The State of the House	2012	From the Ground Up: Innovative Green Homes
Shrooms: East New York	1994	Assemblage: A Critical Journal of Architecture and Design Culture
Future Zones	1998	Perspecta: The Yale Architecture Journal
A Master Plan for East Jerusalem, 1999	2000	Assemblage: A Critical Journal of Architecture and Design Culture
Finding a Dramatic Home for a Political Football	2005	Architectural Record
A Trip to India	2007	Architectural Design
An Alternative Proposal for the Growth of NYU	2013	The Architect's Newspaper
Empire State of Mind	2014	Aeon
A Metropolis—Not an Enclave: Gaza Ring City	2017	Perspecta: The Yale Architecture Journal

== Interviews ==
Title	Year	Publication
-	2009	Unpacking My Library: Architects and Their Books

== Poetry ==
Title	Year	Publication
Poem from New York	1993	Architecture New York

== Speeches and remarks ==
Title	Year	Publication
Counterpoint	1989	Criticism in Architecture
The Urban Tradition	2006	Traditional Dwellings and Settlements Review
