= Candida Crewe =

English writer and journalist (born 1964)

- Born: Candida Annabel Crewe; 6 June 1964 (age 62); London, England
- Education: St Mary's School, Calne
- Occupation: Writer
- Spouse: Donovan Wylie (div. 2010)
- Children: 3
- Parents: Quentin Crewe; Angela Huth
- Relatives: Terence O'Neill (half-uncle); Harold Huth (grandfather); Robert Crewe-Milnes, 1st Marquess of Crewe (great-grandfather)
- Writing career
- Years active: 1985–present
- Genres: Novel; opinion journalism; memoir; feature article; book review; interview
- Notable awards: Catherine Pakenham Award for Journalism (1990)

Candida Annabel Crewe (born 6 June 1964) is an English novelist, non-fiction writer, journalist and founder of the publishing cooperative and organisation of writers The Authors' Collective. She is the author of seven novels and a work of memoir.

== Early life ==
=== Family ===
Candida Annabel Crewe was born in London on 6 June 1964. Her parents were the writers Quentin Crewe and Angela Huth. After her parents divorced, her father married Susan Cavendish. By 1978, Candida's mother had married James Howard-Johnston, a university lecturer in Byzantine Studies at the University of Oxford. Candida Crewe's paternal grandmother was Lady Annabel Crewe-Milnes, who had seven children, one of which was Terence O'Neill, half-brother of Quentin Crewe and the prime minister of Northern Ireland from 1963 to 1969. Lady Annabel was a daughter of the diplomat Robert Crewe-Milnes, 1st Marquess of Crewe.

=== Education and juvenilia ===
Crewe was educated at St Mary's School, Calne, in Wiltshire. She began to write stories at the age of five, though wanted to be an actress. When Crewe was nine, she wrote a play about extramarital affairs for her mother as a birthday present; her first novel was written at age 12 which was an attempt to emulate Noel Streatfeild's children's novels Ballet Shoes (1936) and Tennis Shoes (1937). As an only child, Crewe began writing as a response to loneliness. At 18, Crewe moved to London and began work for the publisher Naim Attallah at his Quartet Bookshop in Soho.

== Career ==
At 18, Crewe wrote her first published novel, Focus (Collins, 1985), which follows a young fashion model involved in a love triangle. From the success of this novel, Crewe became a full-time freelance writer. In 1986–87, when she was 21, Crewe wrote a column for the Evening Standard. Crewe's second book, Romantic Hero (1986), was also published by Collins. The novel follows its main character, India, and her relationship with a deceitful lover. This was followed by Accommodating Molly (Mandarin, 1989) and Mad About Bees (Heinemann, 1991). Crewe has since been a frequent contributor to The Times, Daily Telegraph, The Spectator and The Guardian; and has had two columns in The Times Magazine. For The Times, Crewe interviewed notable authors in the 1990s.

In 1996, Crewe's fifth novel, Falling Away, was published by Century. The novel follows a midwife sent to the Scottish equivalent of one of the Irish Magdalen laundries and was inspired by Crewe's research for her work as a journalist into the history these homes for unmarried mothers, where women were made to perform hard physical labour. The novel shortlisted for the John Llewellyn Rhys Prize. Crewe's sixth book, The Last to Know, was also published by Century in 1998. The novel is focused on a general practitioner's sudden estrangement from his wife, alternating between the two's perspectives. In The Sewanee Review, Merritt Moseley wrote of the novel: "Crewe is good on the little details of life, the ramifications of small decisions and minor actions, and The Last to Know is a fine study of how just such minor matters make up life-changing events".

In 2006, Crewe's seventh book and first work of memoir, Eating Myself, was published by Bloomsbury. The memoir details her suffering from anorexia and bulimia and, later, what she terms "normal-abnormal eating".

Crewe's eighth book and seventh novel, Disapproval, was published in 2026 by The Authors' Collective, a publishing cooperative and organisation of writers originally conceived of by Crewe and launched the same year with co-founders James Dunford Wood, Melissa Jones and Conrad Williams. Crewe conceptualised the Collective as an alternative to the small-press model of independent publishing, with its emphasis on the preservation of authorial integrity with regard to the declining sales of literary fiction.

== Awards ==
Crewe won the Catherine Pakenham Award for Journalism in 1990 for an article on a peanut butter convention. Her novel Falling Away (2006) was shortlisted for the John Llewellyn Rhys Prize. Crewe has twice been a fellow of the Royal Literary Fund, first at Oxford Brookes University from 2009 to 2012 and then at the University of Oxford's School of Archaeology from 2015 to 2017.

== Personal life ==
Crewe was married to the Northern Irish photographer Donovan Wylie, with whom she has three children. They divorced in 2010.

== Bibliography ==
Year	Title	Publisher	ISBN	Pages	Notes
1985	Focus	Collins Publishers	9780006171577	190	Novel.
1986	Romantic Hero	Collins Publishers	9780006173687	224	Novel.
1989	Accommodating Molly	Mandarin	9780434143368	288	Novel.
1991	Mad About Bees	Heinemann	9780749307325	265	Novel.
1996	Falling Away	Century	9780099605911	288	Novel; shortlisted for the John Llewellyn Rhys Prize.
1998	The Last to Know	Century	9780099606017	263	Novel.
2006	Eating Myself	Bloomsbury Publishing	9781408857526	241	Memoir.
2026	Disapproval	The Authors' Collective	9781068527357	309	Novel.
