= Lydia Kallipoliti =

Greek architectural historian

- Λυδία Καλλιπολίτη
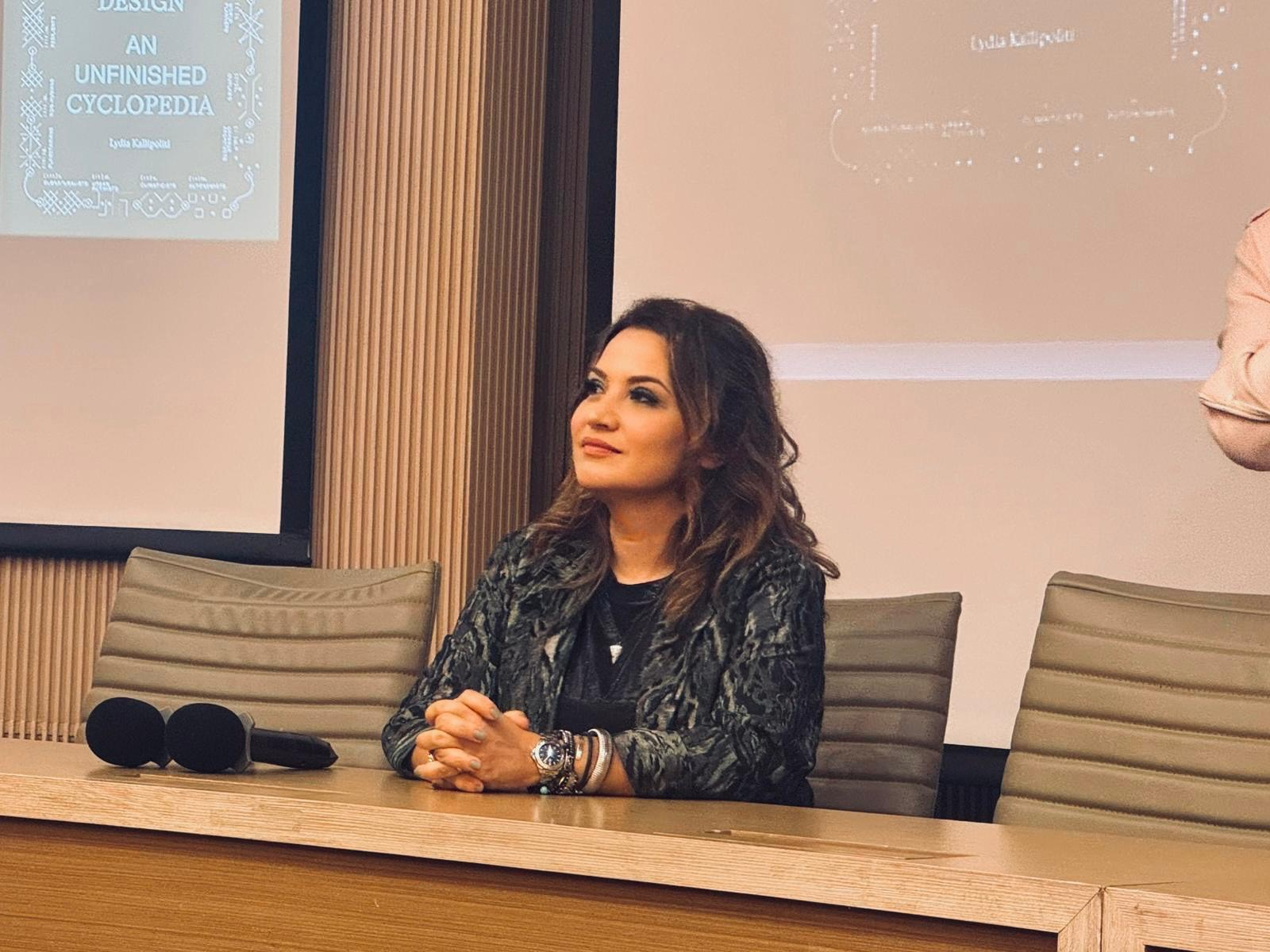

Academic background
- Education: Aristotle University of Thessaloniki; Massachusetts Institute of Technology; Princeton University

Academic work
- Discipline: Architecture
- Sub-discipline: Architectural history
- Institutions: Columbia Graduate School of Architecture, Planning and Preservation
- Website: anacycle.com

Lydia Kallipoliti is a Greek architect, engineer, architectural historian, action researcher, and scholar. Her work examines interdisciplinary studies involving architecture, technology, and environmental politics. Her research has contributed to the way architecture engages with ecological pedagogies, by confronting waste, recycling, and closed-loop systems.

== Early life and education ==
Kallipoliti grew up in Thessaloniki where she graduated from Anatolia College in 1994. She studied at Aristotle University of Thessaloniki, and graduated with a diploma in architecture and engineering. She has a Master of Science in architecture studies from MIT, a Master of Arts and a PhD from Princeton University.

== Career ==
Lydia Kallipoliti is currently the Director of the Master of Science degree in Advanced Architectural Design and an Associate Professor at Columbia Graduate School of Architecture, Planning and Preservation in New York. Additionally, she directs ANAcycle a design studio and thinktank in New York. Kallipoliti was a visiting fellow at the Canadian Centre for Architecture, the University of Queensland, and a visiting critic at the University of Technology Sydney. Additionally, she was an assistant professor at the Cooper Union for the Advancement of Science and Art, and an assistant professor at Rensselaer Polytechnic Institute and Syracuse University.

=== Exhibitions ===
In 2016, she curated the Closed Worlds exhibition at the Storefront for Art and Architecture in New York, supported by grants awarded by the Graham Foundation and the New York State Council on the Arts in 2015. Other editions of the exhibition were held at Woodbury University School of Architecture's WUHO Gallery, and at the University of Technology Sydney's Art Gallery.

List of Exhibitions Curated by Lydia Kallipoliti
Year	Title	Place
2011	Ecoredux 02: Design Manuals for a Dying Planet	Disseny Hub, Barcelona, Spain
2016	Closed Worlds	Storefront for Art and Architecture, New York
2019	Closed Worlds	University of Technology Sydney, Australia
2024	Histories of Ecological Design	Cooper Union, New York

In 2022, Kallipoliti was appointed head co-curator or the Tallinn Architecture Biennale with Areti Markopoilou, following an international competition by the Estonian Museum of Architecture. Their exhibition, "Edible, or, The Architecture of Metabolism," was consequently selected as the winner of the year in universal design in 2023 by the Design Educates Awards. In 2024, she curated the exhibition "Histories of Ecological Design" at Cooper Union in New York in relation to her published book "Histories of Ecological Design: An Unfinished Cyclopedia".

List of Exhibitions as a Design Contributor
Year	Title	Place
2015	Shenzhen Bi-City Biennale of Urbanism\Architecture (UABB) (“Re-Living The City”). Honorable Mention by the independent jury of the Shenzhen Bi-City Biennale.	Shenzhen, China
2016	The Third Istanbul Design Biennial (Are We Human?)	Istanbul, Turkey
2017	Onassis Culture (Tomorrows: Urban fictions for possible futures)	Diplareios School, Athens, Greece
2019	Oslo Architecture Triennale (Enough: The Architecture of Degrowth)	Oslo, Norway
2019	The Design Museum (Moving to Mars)	London, UK
2020	National Gallery of Victoria, Melbourne Design Week (Climate Imagery)	Melbourne, Australia
2021	Biennale Architettura 2021 (How Will We Live Together?)	Venice, Italy
2022	Lisbon Architecture Triennale (Cycles). Received Bronze Prize in Design Educates Awards, in the Universal Design category, 2023.	Lisbon, Portugal
2023	Shanghai Urban Space Art Season (METro-BIOSIS). Shortlisted for The World Architecture Festival 2024 - Temporary Uses.	Shanghai, China
2025	La Biennale Di Venezia, Biennale Architecttura (Intelligens. Natural. Artificial)	Venice, Italy
2025	Trienalle di Milano (We, the Bacteria)	Milan, Italy

== Awards ==
- 2010: Webby Awards.
- 2014: Graham Foundation Production and Presentation Grant for her Closed Worlds exhibition project.
- 2017: Creative Achievement Award from the Association of Collegiate Schools of Architecture.
- 2019: Best of Design Award for Unbuilt Interiors, The architects Newspaper.
- 2020: Tallinn Architecture Biennale 2022.
- 2023: Design Educates Awards, Winner of the Year in Universal Design.
- 2023: Graham Foundation Publication Grant for Edible, or, The Architecture of Metabolism.

== Bibliography ==
=== Books ===
Lydia Kallipolti is the author of The Architecture of Closed Worlds (2018), published by Lars Müller Publishers ISBN 978-3-03778-580-5 and reviewed by the Journal of Architecture, Idea Journal, The Architect's Newspaper, Abitare, Archinect among other journals and media platforms. Additionally, The Architecture of Closed Worlds (2018) was featured in HBO's The White Lotus Series, Season 2.

In 2024, Kallipolti published Histories of Ecological Design, published by Actar Publishers. ISBN 978-1-63840-073-8 Translated in Chinese by Huazhong University of Science and Technology Press (2025). ISBN 9787577218120

=== Other Books Include ===
- Building Metabolism (2025), published by Actar Publishers
- EcoRedux: Design Remedies for an Ailing Planet (Architectural Design) (2010), published by Wiley ISBN 9780470746622
- History of Ecological Design (2018), published by Oxford Research Encyclopedia of Environmental Science doi:10.1093/acrefore/9780199389414.013.144

=== Selected Review Articles, Chapters, and Research Papers ===
- Kallipoliti, Lydia. (2010). "Dry Rot: The Chemical Origins of British Preservation." Future Anterior doi:10.1353/fta.2010.0000
- Kallipoliti, Lydia. (2010). "The Soft Cosmos of AD’s ‘Cosmorama’ in the 1960s and 1970s." Architectural Design doi:10.1002/ad.1160
- Kallipoliti, Lydia. (2010). "No More Schisms." Architectural Design doi:10.1002/ad.1158
- Kallipoliti, Lydia. (2011). "Eco-Redux: Lydia Kallipoliti: Environmental Architecture from 'Object" to 'System' to 'Cloud.'" PRAXIS: Journal of Writing + Building JSTOR 24329271
- Kallipoliti, Lydia. (2012). "From Shit to Food: Graham Caine's Eco-House in South London, 1972-1975." Buildings & Landscapes: Journal of the Vernacular Architecture Forum doi:10.5749/buildland.19.1.0087
- Kallipoliti, Lydia. (2015). "Closed Worlds: The Rise and Fall of Dirty Physiology." Architectural Theory Review. doi:10.1080/13264826.2015.1078385
- Kallipoliti, Lydia. (2015). "Endangered Pieces of Nature and the Architecture of Closed Worlds." Volume (ISSN 1574-9401)
- Kallipoliti, Lydia. (2016). "Masters and Slaves" e-flux Architecture.
- Kallipoliti, Lydia. (2019). "On Interference: Designing Strange Life Forms that Don’t Always Listen." Ardeth doi:10.17454/ARDETH05.13
- Kallipoliti, Lydia. (2019), "Contaminating the Red Planet" published by The Design Museum ISBN 978-1-872005-46-1
- Kallipoliti, Lydia. (2019), Chapter 14 "Big Dog, Or, The Precarious Aesthetics of Tumbling" published by MIT Press ISBN 978-0-262-03943-7
- Dragonas, Panos and Kallipoliti, Lydia. (2020). "Silence Murmur." AA Files JSTOR 27124618
- Kallipoliti, Lydia. (2020), "Zoom In, Zoom Out" e-flux Architecture.
- Kallipoliti, Lydia and Theodoridis, Andreas. (2024) "Field Notes on Pipes and Plants" Log (60).

== See also ==
- Souzána Antonakáki
- Elisabeth Sakellariou
- Theano Fotiou
