= James Howard-Johnston =

English historian of the Byzantine Empire (born 1942)

- Born: 12 March 1942 (age 84); Dublin, Ireland
- Relatives: Clarence Howard-Johnston (father); Douglas Haig, 1st Earl Haig (maternal grandfather)

Academic background
- Education: Christ Church, Oxford (BA, DPhil)
- Thesis: Studies in the Organization of the Byzantine Army in the Tenth and Eleventh Centuries (1971)
- Doctoral advisor: Dimitri Obolensky

Academic work
- Discipline: Byzantine studies
- Institutions: Corpus Christi College, Oxford
- Doctoral students: Mark Whittow, Peter Heather, Peter Frankopan
- Notable works: The Last Great War of Antiquity

James Douglas Howard-Johnston (born 12 March 1942) is an English historian of the Byzantine Empire. He was University Lecturer in Byzantine studies at the University of Oxford. He is an emeritus fellow of Corpus Christi College, Oxford. His approach to Byzantium follows that of Edward Gibbon and concentrates on comparisons between the Byzantine state and its Western counterparts. Howard-Johnston has also done research on Late Antiquity, especially the Roman–Persian Wars and the early history of Islam.

== Early life ==
Born in Dublin, Howard-Johnston is the son of Rear-Admiral Clarence Howard-Johnston and his wife Lady Alexandra Henrietta Louisa Haig, a daughter of Douglas Haig, 1st Earl Haig. His mother married secondly the historian Hugh Trevor-Roper.

He was educated at Christ Church, Oxford, where he read literae humaniores, graduating with a BA in 1964 and a DPhil in 1971.

== Career ==
Howard-Johnston was a junior research lecturer at Christ Church, Oxford, from 1966 to 1971 and also held a junior fellowship at Dumbarton Oaks in 1968–1969. Later, he was University Lecturer in Byzantine Studies and a Fellow of Corpus Christi College, Oxford, until his retirement in 2009. He was briefly interim President of the same college in the mid-2000s.

He was a member of Oxford City Council (1971–76) and Oxfordshire County Council (1973–77, 1981–87). At the time of his re-election in 1973 as an Oxford councillor in the Oxford South ward, where he garnered 43.7% of the vote, he was a member of the Labour Party.

== Personal life ==
Howard-Johnston is married to the novelist Angela Huth and has a step-daughter, Candida Crewe, daughter of Quentin Crewe, and a daughter, Eugenie Teasley.

== Books ==
- (with Nigel Ryan) The Scholar & the Gypsy: Two Journeys to Turkey, Past and Present (1992)
- (ed. with Paul Hayward) The Cult of Saints in Late Antiquity and the Middle Ages: Essays on the contribution of Peter Brown (1999)
- Witnesses to a World Crisis: Historians and Histories of the Middle East in the Seventh Century (Oxford 2010)
- Historical Writing in Byzantium (Heidelberg 2014)
- (ed.) Social Change in Town and Country in Eleventh-Century Byzantium (Oxford 2020)
- The Last Great War of Antiquity (Oxford 2021)
- Byzantium: Economy, Society, Institutions 600–1100 (Oxford 2024)
- Byzantium in a Changing World (Oxford, 2025)
- Byzantine Historical Writing (Oxford, 2026)
