= Hendrika Buelinckx =

Belgian architect and educator

- Born: Hendrika Buelinckx; Brussels, Belgium
- Known for: Publications
- Notable work: Article on Brussels, Belgium on Encyclopedia of Twentieth Century Architecture

Hendrika Buelinckx is a Belgian architect and educator.

== Early life and education ==
Hendrika Buelinckx grew up in Brussels, Belgium. She moved to Texas and after traveling through it for the first time, she "fell in love with the American West" She has written encyclopedic entries, a book, technical reports and has done editorial work.

A graduate of the Higher Institute of Architecture St. Lukas, Brussels, Belgium and Free University of Brussels, Belgium, she went on to hold a position as a Post-Doctoral Fellow in the Department of Design at The University of California, Los Angeles.

== Teaching ==
Since 1995 Buelinckx has held a position teaching at Texas Tech University College of Architecture. Where she has had a seminar course on Women and the Architecture of the American West (WAoAW). WAoAW explores, in an interdisciplinary seminar setting, how, throughout history, women have envisioned, inspired, commissioned, designed, built, criticized, characterized, and theorized the architectural environment west of the Mississippi River. She has won the President's Excellence in Teaching award.

== Research ==
She has published widely in both English and French on the topics of architecture, history, computer-aided design, and European architectural history. She wrote an encyclopedic entry about Brussels, Belgium for the Encyclopedia of Twentieth Century Architecture. Where she describes the vital role that Brussels played in the history of modern architecture.

== Awards ==
In 1985 she won the Travel Research Award, National Science Foundation, Belgium. From 1987-1990 she received the Chancellors' Fellowship, University of California, Los Angeles, CA. In 1991 she won the Chancellor's Dissertation Year Fellowship, University of California, Los Angeles.
