= Upe Flueckiger =

Upe Flueckiger, a.k.a. Urs Peter Flueckiger, is a professor of architecture at Texas Tech University. A native of Switzerland, Flueckiger is internationally recognized for the design of his house in Lubbock, Texas.

Before 1998, he worked with various architectural firms, including Mario Botta's studio in Lugano, Switzerland, and the New York-based Rockwell Group, led by David Rockwell.

Upe is also the author of How Much House?: Thoreau, Le Corbusier and the Sustainable Cabin (Birkhäuser 2016) and Donald Judd: Architecture in Marfa, Texas (Birkhäuser 2007 / second and expanded edition 2021).
