= The Authors' Collective =

British organisation of writers

- Founded: 2026
- Founders: Candida Crewe; Melissa Jones; James Dunford Wood; Conrad Williams
- Country of origin: United Kingdom
- Official website: https://www.theauthorscollective.com/

The Authors' Collective is a British organisation of writers and independent publishing cooperative founded in 2026.

== History ==
The Authors' Collective was conceived of by the writer Candida Crewe as an alternative to the small-press model of independent publishing. Officially launched in March 2026, Crewe co-founded with the organisation with the writers James Dunford Wood, Melissa Jones and Conrad Williams. Crewe has written in The Oldie that The Authors' Collective was formed partially in response to the rise in popularity of the romantic fantasy genre; she has also stated that its formation responded to the fact that established and "respected authors are sometimes overlooked" by large publishers given the decline in the readership of literary fiction.

== Organisation ==
=== Process ===
The Authors' Collective is a cooperative; prospective members, who must have been previously published, submit new manuscripts which are approved by existing members before undergoing an editorial process. The rights and proceeds of books published are retained by their individual authors. The Collective is not only an independent publishing organisation but a society as well, founded to be "a like-minded peer group" concerned with authorial integrity.

=== Members ===
Writers published by The Authors' Collective include:

- Vanessa Branson
- Candida Crewe
- Melissa Jones
