= Clarence Howard-Johnston =

British Royal Navy officer and inventor

Rear-Admiral Clarence Howard-Johnston CB DSO DSC
- Nickname: "Johnny"
- Born: Clarence Dinsmore Howard Johnston; 13 October 1903
- Died: 26 January 1996 (aged 92)
- Allegiance: United Kingdom
- Branch: Royal Navy
- Service years: 1917–1955
- Rank: Rear-Admiral
- Commands: HMS Viscount; HMS Malcolm; Anti-Submarine Division at the Admiralty; HMS Vernon; Various NATO postings; Secondment to Greek Navy, 1938–1940
- Conflicts: Second World War
- Awards: Companion of the Order of the Bath; Distinguished Service Order; Distinguished Service Cross; Mentioned in Despatches

Rear-Admiral Clarence Dinsmore Howard-Johnston, CB, DSO, DSC (13 October 1903 – 26 January 1996) was a British Royal Navy officer and inventor. He specialised in anti-submarine warfare during the inter-war years, later heading the Anti-Submarine Division at the Admiralty. In 1953, he was promoted to rear-admiral and served on the NATO staff.

== Early life ==
Born in St George Hanover Square, Westminster, Clarence Johnston was the son of John Howard Johnston (1850–1913), an American from New Hampshire, and his wife Dorothy Florence Baird, of Scottish origins. Both the Johnston and Baird families were in engineering. He was brought up in Nice, France, and later adopted the name Howard-Johnston, appending his father's and his own middle name to his surname.

Howard-Johnston's father died in 1913, and his mother remarried, becoming Comtesse Pierre du Brevil de St Germain. He entered the Royal Naval College, Osborne, in 1917, and proceeded to the Royal Naval College, Dartmouth, as a cadet. His obituary in The Times says he first went to sea in 1922 as a midshipman.

== Career ==
The sources differ regarding Howard-Johnston's early career, with The Times saying he spent some time on secondment in France and then was posted to China as second-in-command of HMS Tarantula while another source says that he was a lieutenant in 1925 when he served in Tarantula on the Yangtze river. By 1931, he had decided to specialise in anti-submarine warfare, and served in destroyers and the anti-submarine training centre at HMS Osprey. It was here that he invented the Towed Asdic Repeater Target. By 1937, he had become a commander – his first command was HMS Viscount. After Viscount, from 1938 to 1940 he was seconded to the Royal Hellenic Navy as Director of Studies at the Greek Naval War College in Athens and was decorated by the Greeks.

In 1940, Howard-Johnston joined the anti-submarine warfare division at the Admiralty, and later the same year was detached to set up an anti-submarine training unit at Quiberon and then to organise anti-submarine operations in Norway. He received a Distinguished Service Cross for his time there, although not for anti-submarine duties: instead, for the evacuations at Andalsnes and Molde. A month later, he was ordered to demolish the port facilities at St Malo, and received a Mention in Dispatches for this work.

Howard-Johnston was then transferred to command HMS Malcolm on the north Atlantic convoys, for which he received another Mention in Dispatches – and then in January 1941 the DSO, "for skill and enterprise in action against Enemy Submarines", referring to the sinking of U-651. He was then transferred to Liverpool, to train others, before being promoted to captain in June 1943, and had been made director of the Anti-Submarine Division at the Admiralty.

In 1945, he was given command of the light cruiser HMS Bermuda, and then from August 1950 to October 1952 was Captain of the HMS Vernon Torpedo School. In 1951, while at Vernon, he had to organise the unsuccessful search for HMS Affray, on which his son was serving. There were no survivors.

In 1946, Howard-Johnston was honoured by the United States when he was appointed as an Officer of the Legion of Merit. In 1953, he was promoted to rear-admiral, and served on the NATO staff before finally retiring. He was appointed a Companion of the Order of the Bath in the 1955 New Year Honours.

== Personal life ==
Howard-Johnston was married three times. In 1928, he married Esme Fitzgibbon. He had a son from his first marriage, Richard Howard-Johnston, a sub-lieutenant who died in 1951 in the loss of HMS Affray. In 1941, he married secondly Lady Alexandra Henrietta Louisa Haig, a daughter of Field Marshal Earl Haig, with whom he had a daughter and two sons, including the historian James Howard-Johnston, before that marriage also ended in divorce. His final marriage, which was childless, was to Paulette Helleu, a daughter of the artist Paul César Helleu and a childhood friend of Diana Mitford. They were married in 1955 and lived in Dolphin Square, Pimlico, and in Paris and Biarritz. She survived him for many years, reaching the age of 104.
