= Dana Cupkova =

Architect and researcher

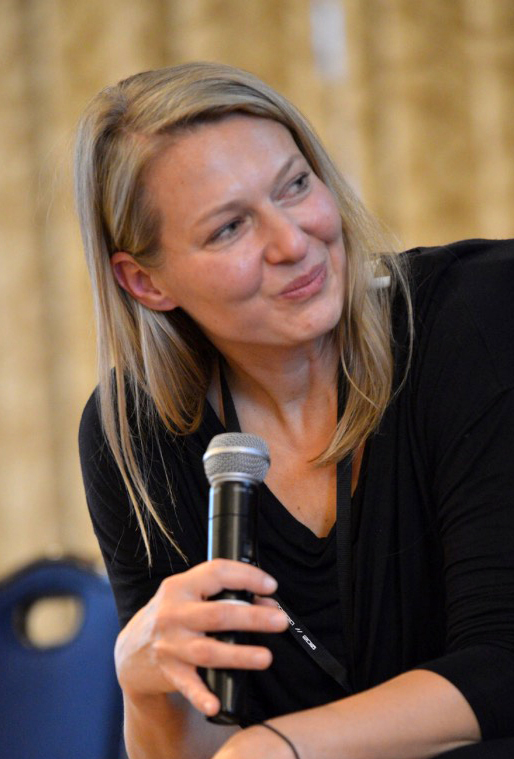
- Cupkova at 2016 ACADIA Conference

Academic background
- Education: Slovak University of Technology in Bratislava; Academy of Fine Arts and Design in Bratislava; UCLA

Dana Čupková is an architect, researcher, and educator whose work integrates computational design with environmental performance, focusing on regenerative material systems and the spatial dynamics of ecological resilience. She holds a full professorship at Carnegie Mellon School of Architecture, where she serves as the graduate program track chair for the Master of Science in Sustainable Design program and also serves on the Editorial Board of International Journal of Architectural Computing (IJAC). Her design work has been featured in publications including Dwell, The Architectural Review, Green Building & Design, The Cornell Journal of Architecture, Architect's Newspaper, Architect Magazine, and the International Journal of Architectural Computing.

She is also the co-founder and design director of EPIPHYTE Lab.

== Early life and education ==
Cupkova was born and raised in Slovakia (formerly Czechoslovakia) during the Cold War and the Velvet Revolution. Her mother was a microbiologist and her father a civil engineer.

She earned a professional degree of Engineer Architect in architecture and urbanism with focus on Experimental and Ecological Architecture from the Faculty of Architecture and Urban Design at the Slovak University of Technology in Bratislava. She studied architecture at the Academy of Fine Arts and Design in Bratislava in the Laboratory of Architecture of Imro Vaško.

Cupkova pursued her international education, completing her thesis at the Academy of Fine Arts in Vienna, in Michael Sorkin Studio. She later obtained a Master of Architecture degree from the School of the Arts and Architecture at UCLA, where she was awarded the Unrestricted University Fellowship, the Mimi Perloff Award, and the Kate Neal Kinley Memorial Fellowship for outstanding design work.

== Career ==
Cupkova is currently a professor at Carnegie Mellon University's School of Architecture. Additionally, she chairs the Graduate Program Track for the Master of Science in Sustainable Design. She has held this role since 2017.

Previously, she was a Visiting Assistant Professor in the Department of Architecture at Cornell University from 2005 to 2012. She also served on the ACADIA Board of Directors from 2014 to 2018.

In 2009 she co-founded EPIPHYTE Lab, a research platform with her late husband, Kevin Pratt. The lab studies the relationships between landscapes and architectural design, particularly in relation to carbon footprints and the socio-ecological resilience of placemaking.

She designed the Senyai Thai Kitchen project, which won The American Architecture Prize in 2017 in the Commercial Interior Design category. Cupkova's design for the restaurant was inspired by the vaulted geometry of ancient Thai architecture, incorporating acoustic ceiling geometry and lighting elements.

She is a recipient of the 2019 ACADIA Teaching Award, the 2022 ACSA Creative Achievement, and a 2022–23 Fulbright US Scholar.

=== Research ===
Her work focuses on advancing digital design and fabrication techniques, use of bio-based materials, and climate-responsive systems reducing the carbon footprint.

== Selected publications ==
- Bard, Joshua; Cupkova, Dana; Washburn, Newell; Zeglin, Garth (2018). "Robotic concrete surface finishing: a moldless approach to creating thermally tuned surface geometry for architectural building components using Profile-3D-Printing". Construction Robotics. 2 (1–4): 53–65. doi:10.1007/s41693-018-0014-x. ISSN 2509-811X.
- Cupkova, Dana; Promoppatum, Patcharapit (2017). "Modulating Thermal Mass Behavior Through Surface Figuration". ACADIA Proceedings. Proceedings of the 37th Annual Conference of the Association for Computer Aided Design in Architecture (ACADIA). ACADIA: 202–211. doi:10.52842/conf.acadia.2017.202. ISBN 978-0-692-96506-1.
- Cupkova, Dana; Azel, Nicolas (2015). "Mass Regimes: Geometric Actuation of Thermal Behavior". International Journal of Architectural Computing. 13 (2): 169–193. doi:10.1260/1478-0771.13.2.169. ISSN 1478-0771.
- Bard, Joshua; Cupkova, Dana; Washburn, Newell; Zeglin, Garth (2018-08-26), "Thermally Informed Robotic Topologies: Profile-3D-Printing for the Robotic Construction of Concrete Panels, Thermally Tuned Through High Resolution Surface Geometry", Robotic Fabrication in Architecture, Art and Design 2018, Cham: Springer International Publishing, pp. 113–125, doi:10.1007/978-3-319-92294-2_9, ISBN 978-3-319-92293-5
- Cupkova, Dana; Yao, Shi-Chune; Azel, Nicolas (2015). "Morphologically Controlled Thermal Rate of Ultra High Performance Concrete". MRS Proceedings. 1800. doi:10.1557/opl.2015.569. ISSN 0272-9172.
- Cupkova, Dana; Azel, Nicolas (2014). "MASS REGIMES: Geometrically Actuated Thermal Flows". ACADIA Proceedings. Proceedings of the 34th Annual Conference of the Association for Computer Aided Design in Architecture (ACADIA). ACADIA: 237–246. doi:10.52842/conf.acadia.2014.237. ISBN 978-1-926724-47-8.
