= Dora Epstein-Jones =

Historian of architecture

Dora Epstein-Jones is an educator, historian and theorist of architecture.

Epstein-Jones has a Ph.D., in Architectural History, Theory and Criticism from the University of California, Los Angeles and an M.A. Urban Planning, from UCLA. She served as the chair of the Texas Tech University College of Architecture. Her work explores the boundaries of architecture's discipline, questions of practice, gender and criticality. Epstein-Jones has taught at Sci-Arc, University of California Berkeley and Texas Tech University.

== Publications ==
=== Journal articles ===
- "The Mouth and The Gullet"
- "The Pas de Chat: A Modern Tale of Discipline and Reward"
- "The Nonsignificance of Columns"

=== Dissertation ===
- "Architecture on the Move: Modernism and Mobility in the Postwar"

=== Conference Papers ===
- "Drawing the Line, or 'Surrender, surrender, but don’t give yourself away...'"
- "Fast, Cheap and In Control"
- "Extreme Makeover; or, How the F-word Shaped Contemporary Architecture"
