= Angela Huth =

English novelist and journalist

Angela Huth (born 29 August 1938) is an English novelist and journalist.

== Early life and career ==
Huth is the daughter of the actor Harold Huth.

She attended Lawnside School, which merged with Malvern St James in 1994. She left school at sixteen to paint and study art in France and Italy. At eighteen, she travelled, mostly alone, across the United States before returning to England to work on newspapers and magazines.

Huth presented programmes on BBC television, including How It Is and Why and Man Alive. Having been a journalist, she moved on to writing books, and has published three collections of short stories and eleven novels. Her novel Land Girls (1995) was a best-seller and was made into a feature film, The Land Girls (1998), starring Rachel Weisz and Anna Friel. A sequel in 2010 was called Once a Land Girl. Both are about the Women's Land Army – British women who worked on farms during the Second World War while the men were away fighting.

Huth has also written plays for radio, television, and stage, and is a freelance journalist, critic and broadcaster. Her play The Understanding ran at the Strand Theatre in 1982 and starred Ralph Richardson and Joan Greenwood.

Huth edited a collection of eulogies, published in 2004 as Well-Remembered Friends, including Seamus Heaney on Ted Hughes, Martin Amis on Kingsley Amis, and Alan Bennett on Peter Cook.

She is a Fellow of the Royal Society of Literature.

== Reception ==
"Huth inhabits all the lonely people with great compassion and makes them seem unbearably poignant. But she balances delicately, introducing comedy at awful, unlikely moments… Her eye for detail sometimes makes me think of Alan Bennett." – The Daily Telegraph

"Huth has an eye for perfect short-story material… She demonstrates an enviable ability to capture in small vignettes the very English quality of 'hanging on in quiet desperation'… A full technicolour storyteller who clearly enjoys herself." The Spectator

== Personal life ==
In 1961, Huth married the journalist and travel writer Quentin Crewe and with him had a daughter, Candida; they later divorced.

In 1978, Huth married secondly a university don, James Howard-Johnston. They live in Warwickshire and have one daughter.

== Bibliography ==
- Nowhere Girl, 1970
- Virginia Fly Is Drowning, 1972
- Sun Child , 1975
- Wanting, 1985
- Invitation to the Married Life, 1993
- South of the Lights, 1977
- Land Girls, 1995
- Easy Silence, 1999
- Wives of the Fishermen, 2000
- Of Love and Slaughter, 2003
- Colouring In, 2006
- The Boy Who Stood Under the Horse, 2006
- Once a Land Girl, 2010
- Deception Is So Easy, 2013
