= Neil Spiller =

English architect and theorist (born 1961)

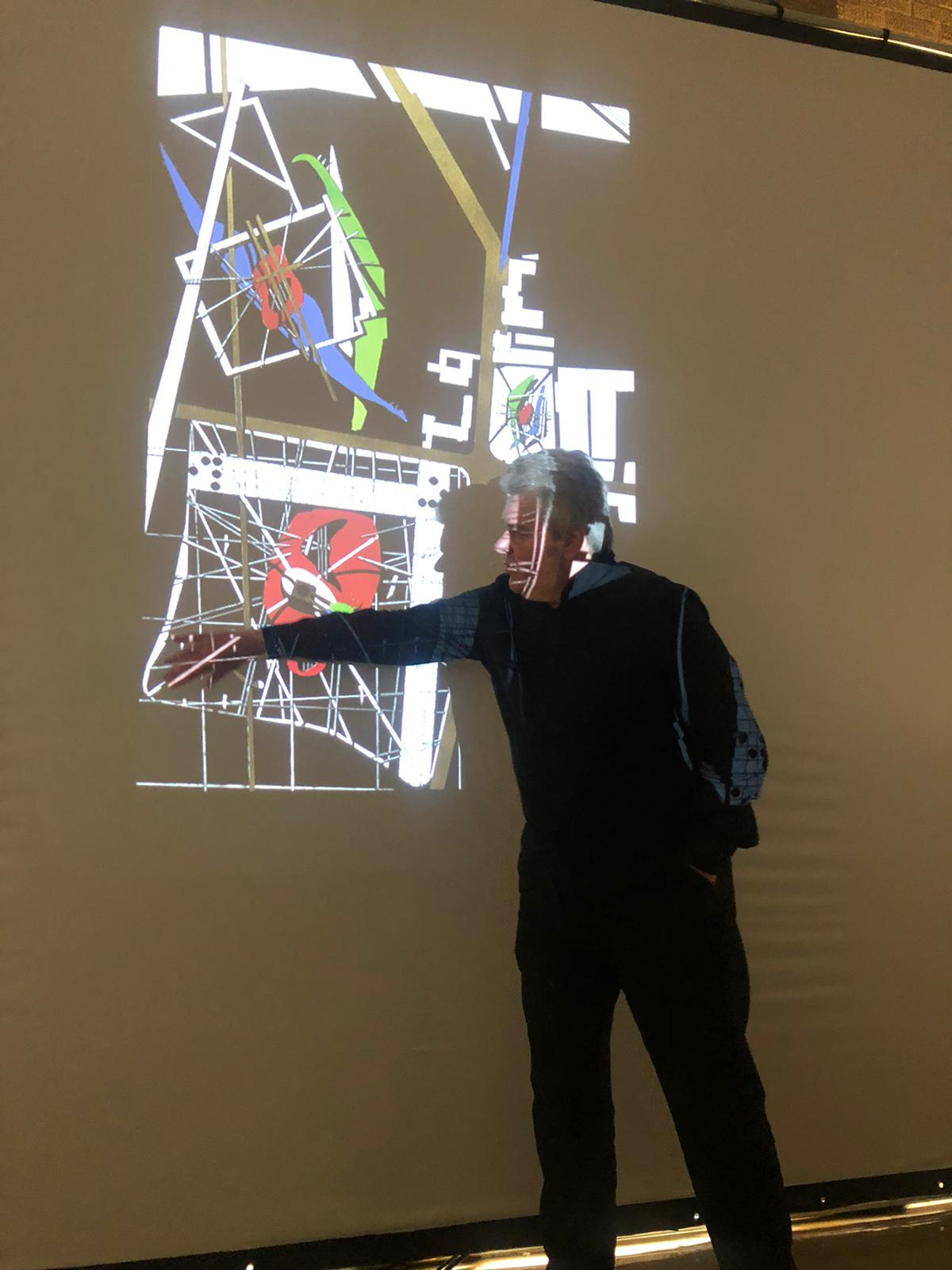
- Spiller in 2020
- Born: Neil Alexander Spiller; 22 October 1961 (age 64); Tankerton, Whitstable, England
- Occupations: Architect; university professor; artist; editor; writer
- Known for: Communicating Vessels
- Spouse: Melissa Jones (m. 1997; div. 2012)
- Children: 2

Academic background
- Education: Thames Polytechnic
- Influences: Surrealism; 'Pataphysics; second-order cybernetics; alchemy; method of loci

Academic work
- Discipline: Architecture
- Institutions: University College London; University of Greenwich
- Notable ideas: Cyberspace architecture; protocell architecture

Neil Alexander Spiller (born 22 October 1961) is an English visionary architect, artist, professor emeritus and editor of Architectural Design (AD). He is widely regarded as a 'paradigm-shifting' theorist in the architectural discourse. Spiller is known for being the founding director of the Advanced Virtual and Technological Architectural Research Group (AVATAR), a think tank established at The Bartlett, University College London (UCL), which pioneered the implementation of digital theory in architecture. Outside of academia, he is best known for his long project and paracosm, Communicating Vessels (1998–present).

Stylistically, Spiller produces what he terms 'interstitial drawings', created with reference to the conventions of architectural drawing but often representing structures unable to be built outside of virtual space. He is a champion of the notion that architecture must not be bound to the tangible. As he writes: '[m]y preoccupation is to compositionally straddle the virtual and the actual, art and matter'.

== Early life and education ==
Spiller was born in Tankerton, a suburb Whitstable, England, and raised in the village of Sturry. He was educated initially at Sturry Primary School before attending the Geoffrey Chaucer School in Canterbury from age 11 to 18. His parents were Arthur George Spiller, an electrician and petty officer in the Royal Navy, and Betty Ella (née Everett). His maternal grandfather was Walter Oliver Everett, a building contractor who constructed the Marlowe Theatre in Canterbury. His paternal grandfather, Sidney Spiller, was apprenticed at Windsor Castle as a gardener during the latter part of Queen Victoria's reign.

Spiller began training as an architect in London, in the early 1980s. He submitted a sketch of a great crested grebe as part of his application to Thames Polytechnic (now the University of Greenwich), which gained him admission. Spiller describes the Polytechnic's sensibilities during his time as a student as adhering to the 'tasteful Modernism of the Cambridge School'. He refers to architects of this movement, such as Sir Leslie Martin, as 'Jesuit Modernists', bound by design principles such as form follows function and the prohibition of ornament which Spiller regards as emblematic of 'architectural guilt'. Instead, he became enamoured of more disruptive, post-structuralist approaches which were gaining traction at this time through the work of architects such as Lebbeus Woods, Daniel Libeskind and Michael Webb. Spiller took great inspiration from these architects' aesthetic philosophies, attending many of their exhibitions at the Architectural Association (AA). At this time, Spiller formed a connexion with Cedric Price, on whom he wrote his third-year dissertation, 'Right Price, Wrong Time'.

He also took an interest in traditional British architectural movements, such as the Gothic Revival, particularly the work of William Burges, Harry Stuart Goodhart-Rendel and Augustus Pugin, and writing his diploma thesis on Harrow School, ecclesiology and the revival of Queen Anne style architecture. He graduated from Thames Polytechnic in 1987 as an RIBA Silver Medal finalist.

== Career ==
=== Spiller Farmer Architects ===
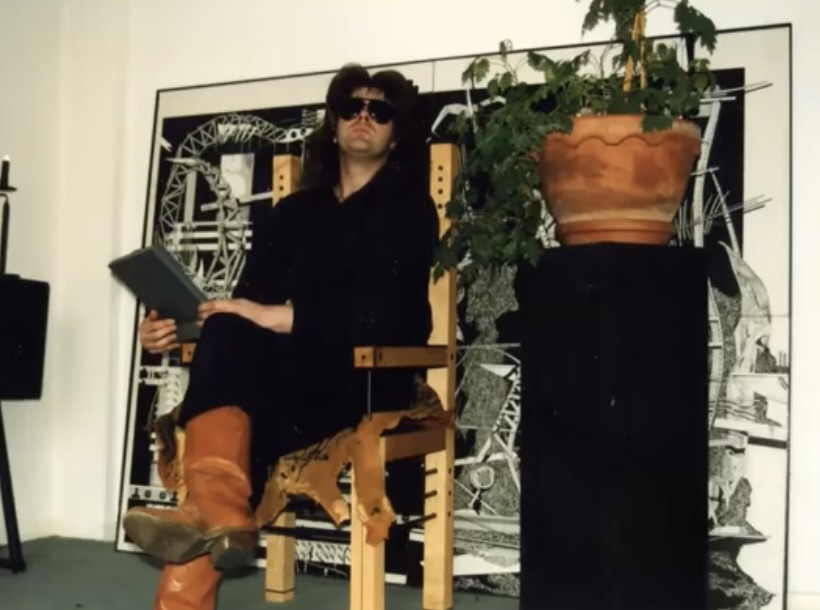
Spiller in Piešťany, c. 1990.

After graduating, Spiller moved to Blackheath and formed the practice Spiller Farmer Architects with fellow Thames Polytechnic alumnus Laurie Farmer in 1987. The two would collaborate on architectural drawings, dividing card-stock between themselves to produce what Spiller terms 'schizophrenic drawings'. These early works largely focused on objects isolated from their spaces rather than drawing spaces themselves, contextualised by objects. An early example of this is their Vitriolic Column (1986), with Spiller citing Charles Jencks as an early influence. Spiller Farmer also produced plans for Milwaukee and Genoa made anew, with reference to Le Corbusier's ambition to redesign Paris. Much of this early work was published contemporarily in the magazine Building Design.

The Spiller Farmer practice was based in London and opened offices in Bratislava in 1990. The same year they published their early drawings in a collection titled Burning Whiteness, Plump Black Lines, with Cedric Price introducing the volume. Spiller incorporated much of Price's philosophy of architecture around this time, chiefly his ideas regarding architecture as an enabling and liberating technology. Due to the economic recession, Spiller Farmer Architects was dissolved in 1995. Farmer however remained in Slovakia and continued to work under the practice's name. His company eventually diversified into real estate consultancy, being re-founded in Zagreb in 2003.

=== The Bartlett, UCL ===
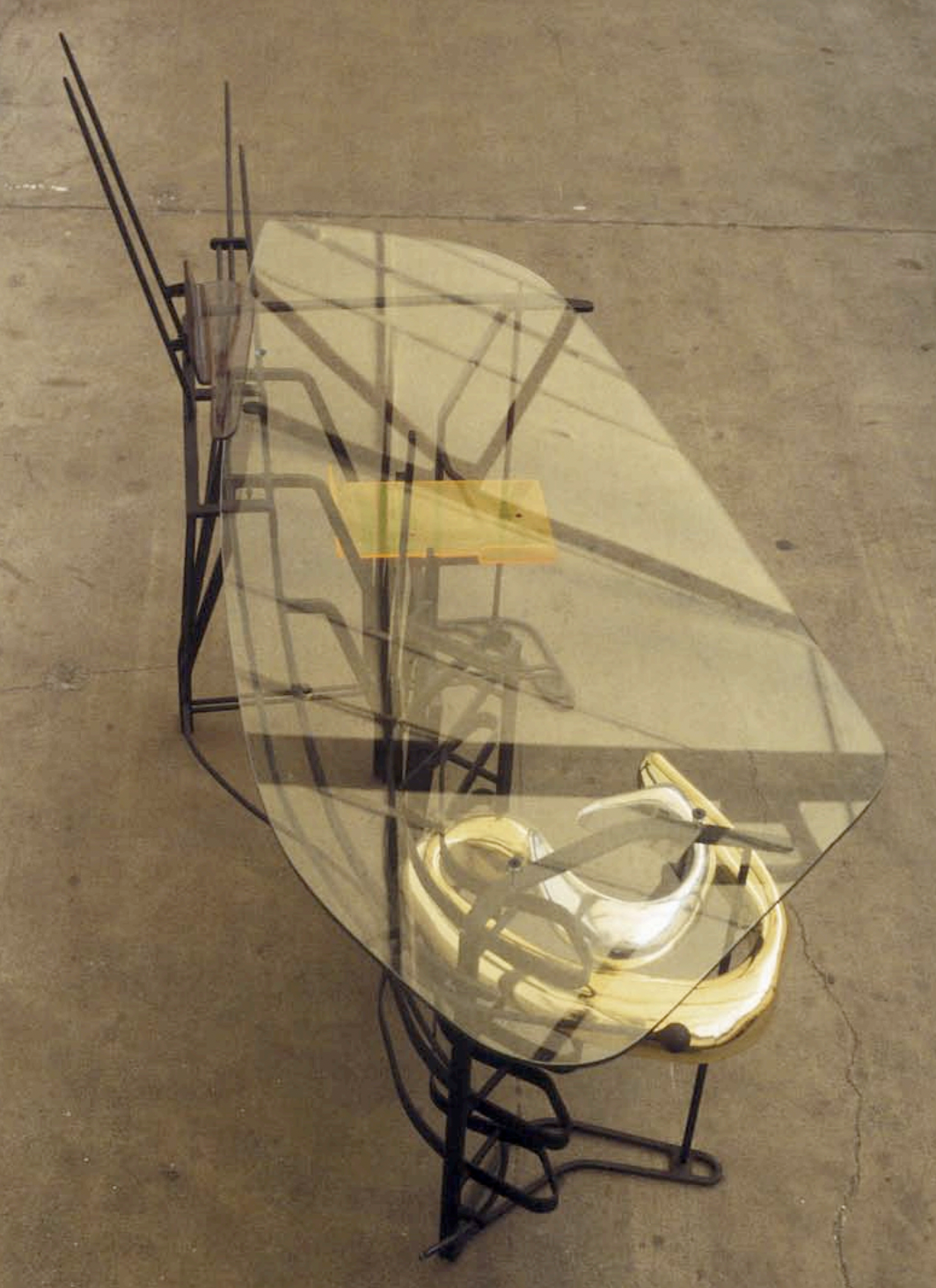
Neil Spiller, Hot Desk or Nano Desk (c. 1993)

Burning Whiteness, Plumb Black Lines gained Spiller recognition as an emerging talent. In the early 1990s, he was approached in a bar by Sir Peter Cook who recruited him to The Bartlett. In lieu of Farmer, Spiller began working with Philip 'Mad Phil' Watson who was recruited to The Bartlett's faculty around the same time and the two continued to teach together until 2018. In 1991, the two travelled to New York City with the staff of Watson's previous institution, Birmingham Polytechnic (now Birmingham City University). There Spiller purchased the book Cyberspace: the First Steps (1991), edited by Michael Benedik, which inspired a new preoccupation with cyberspace and nanotechnology. On this subject, he wrote Digital Dreams – Architecture and the Alchemic Technologies from 1993–95, publishing it in 1998.

In 1992, Spiller was invited to include his work in AD's Theory and Experimentation exhibitions at the Royal Institute of British Architects (RIBA) and the Royal Academy of Arts (RA) alongside those who had inspired him, such as Cook, Lebbeus Woods, Daniel Libeskind, Bernard Tschumi and the Coop Himmelb(l)au firm. Woods in particular championed Spiller's work and two years after the exhibition, Spiller was asked to guest edit an issue of AD. Working alongside Martin Pearce, he produced the seminal Architects in Cyberspace (1995), the first journal publication to explore the intersections between cyberspace and architecture. The issue included contributions from architects such as Tschumi and William Mitchell; artists like Ian Hunter, Roy Ascott, Madeline Gins and Stelarc; as well as theorists such as Sadie Plant and Nick Land, who together would found the Cybernetic Culture Research Unit (CCRU) later that year.

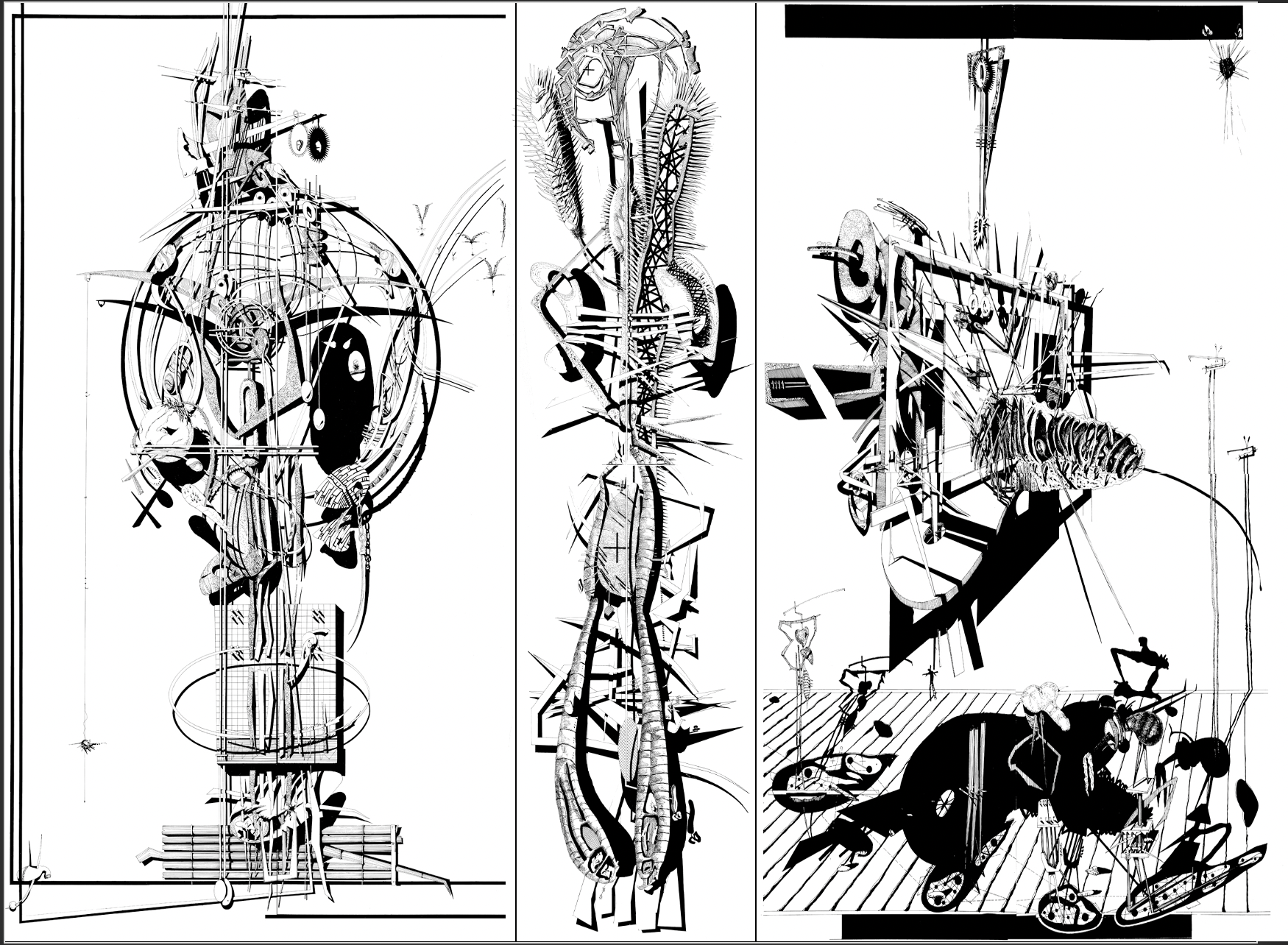
Neil Spiller, Trashed Triptych (1996). From left to right: Genesis to Genocide, The Martyrdom of Saint Sebastian, Nativity in Black.

Around 1993, Spiller was commissioned by his girlfriend, a psychologist, to design a desk. Spiller did so, representing in its sculptural elements vats of swirling nanotechnological material. The piece was built by sixteen*(makers). After Spiller and the client's relationship ended, she returned the desk to him, worrying that it would pose a danger to her infant.

As Diploma and MArch Director between 1993 and 2010, Spiller revolutionised the teaching at The Bartlett, the reputation of their degree programmes coming to be regarded as some of the best in the world at that time. During this time, he also occupied a visiting professorship as a John and Magda McHale Research Fellow, State University of New York in 2002. By 2011, The Bartlett's students had won the RIBA President's Silver Medal an unprecedented six times, winning more often than any other institution over a period of 18 years. Spiller would rise to become Vice-Dean under Christine Hawley before leaving The Bartlett in 2010.

=== The University of Greenwich ===
In 2010, Spiller was approached by Lady Blackstone and asked to head and reinvigorate the University of Greenwich's School of Architecture, as he and Cook had done at The Bartlett. At the time, the university was planning to erect a new building for the School, designed by Heneghan Peng Architects and situated opposite Nicholas Hawksmoor's St Alfege Church. Spiller accepted and brought several of the more radical and experimental members of The Bartlett's faculty with him to Greenwich. By 2013, Spiller had been named Hawksmoor Chair of Architecture and Landscape and Deputy Pro-Vice-Chancelor. In 2018, Spiller left the university. Subsequently, Spiller occupied a visiting professorship and the position of Visiting Azrieli Critic at Carleton University, from 2020–22; as well as a visiting professorship at Università Iuav di Venezia, Italy, in 2021.

=== Architectural Design (AD) ===
Due to the success of Architects in Cyberspace, AD asked Spiller to edit another in 1998, this time a monograph on his work up until that point, titled Maverick Deviations. He would go on to guest edit several more editions of AD including the influential Protocell Architecture with his former PhD student, Rachel Armstrong.

From 2008 to 2010, Spiller authored a regular column for AD titled 'Spiller's Bits'; in 2018, he became the publication's editor. Prior to this, Spiller had been the editor of Building Design Interactive magazine and sat on the board of both AD and Technoetic Arts Journal. He had also previously contributed to the Architects' Journal (AJ), BBC Future, The Architectural Review, and Architectural Record.

== AVATAR Group ==
In the early 1990s, The Bartlett had adopted a hermetic 'unit' system where the faculty formed student groups of 15–17 members led by a distinguished tutor and separated by research area. Under Spiller's auspices, many of the School's faculty and students had become engaged in some form of digital theory. In 2004, Spiller founded a special inter-unit collective called 'Advanced Virtual and Technological Architectural Research', known as the AVATAR Group or Laboratory. AVATAR had its own dedicated master's and doctorate programmes. Bruce Sterling writes of AVATAR as an 'interdisciplinary research agenda [that] explores all manner of digital and visceral terrain and considers the impact of advanced technology on architectural design, engaging with cybernetics, aesthetics and philosophy to develop new ways of manipulating the built environment'. AVATAR quickly grew into an international think tank and research centre, pioneering the discourse surrounding the impact of advanced technologies on architectural design.

In 2008, AVATAR was described in the press as '[m]ore like an extraordinary megalomaniac art collective than a student seminar, AVATAR doesn't design buildings – it designs futures'. Two years later, Spiller and Rachel Armstrong's work on protocells, a key research area for AVATAR, was featured in Nature.

== Communicating Vessels ==
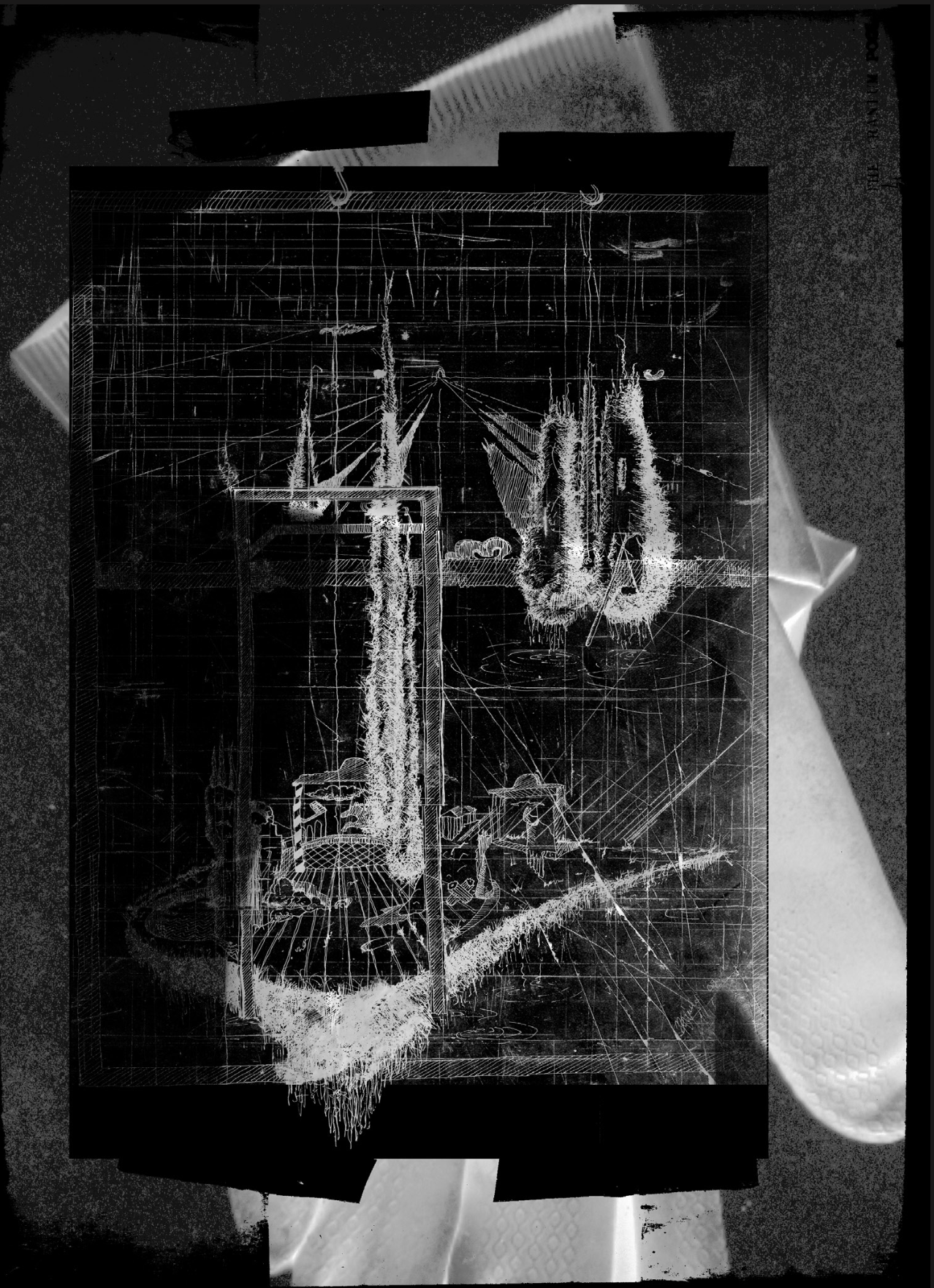
Neil Spiller, Analysis of Beauty (Part 1) (2010)

=== Background and Interpretation ===
In 1998, tiring of moving quickly from one project to the next, Spiller embarked upon his ongoing long project, Communicating Vessels, an artistic and literary paracosm which Spiller has variously described as 'autobiograph[ical]', 'psychogeographical', and, with reference to the work of Dame Frances Yates, 'memory theatre'. As of 2018, Spiller estimated that there are approximately 1000 drawings associated with the project. The name 'Communicating Vessels' is an allusion to André Breton's Les Vases Communicants (1931). Spiller has said that the Vessels project has 66 sub-titles including 'Rude Mechanicals', 'Critical Paths' and 'Slam-houndian Surrealism', a reference to the opening sentence of William Gibson's Count Zero (1986).

At the project's inception, Spiller drew inspiration from Daniel Liberskind's Chamber Works (1983), Michael Webb's Temple Island (1987), Ben Nicholson's Appliance House (1990) as well as the prose of Francesco Colonna's Hypnerotomachia Poliphili (1499), intending to design his project's spaces and objects to reflect motifs of Surrealist art and theory. Most notably, Communicating Vessels references Alfred Jarry's 'Pataphysics and its three declensions: anomaly, hybridity and clinamen.

Spiller imagines the project as designing a space, both real and virtual, centred on an island in the River Stour, near Sturry, where he grew up. This space consists of architectural elements familiar to Spiller's youth and the parochial English house and garden that have undergone deconstruction: in Spiller's words, 'birdbath, entrance gates, [...] topiary' are 'redesigned [...] in the wake' of 'the surreal protocols of contemporary architectural design'. As a project focused on Spiller's own memory and imagination, psychosexual hermeneutics such Salvador Dalí's paranoiac-critical method form as major a part of the project as its actual designs. In a lecture delivered virtually to Odile Decq's Confluence Institute in 2020, Spiller remarked that the project is as much about 'semiotic[s]' as it is about the 'embroidering of space'. In 2011, Lebbeus Woods wrote of the Vessels project:

Spiller's world includes much of the familiar—boundaries, edges, limits, creating forms we half or fully recognize. Then there are the mysterious forms, the ones we don't recognize at all. Bringing them all together to form a continuous landscape suggests above all else a transformation—the familiar past will become the unfamiliar future. [...] Spiller's drawings are unsettling, even frightening. He presents us with a world we must work at to navigate. Rationality and emotion are needed in equal measure and will meet in our imaginations. The sheer beauty—or ugliness—of the drawings seduces us to try, to match his creative efforts with our own. This brings the drawings firmly into the domain of architecture and far from that of art. The architect has designed spaces for us to inhabit, rather than objects for us to appreciate from outside.

=== The Boy and the Professor ===
As well as being a vast series of drawings, the Vessels project is also a literary one: Spiller interpolates sections of creative prose into his academic writing when discussing his work. Many of the characters of 'The Island of Vessels' are inspired by Greek mythology, or are themselves Greek mythological figures such as Hermes, Hectate and the Minotaur (also a reference to Breton's journal Minotaure).

Central, however, is 'the Boy' and his dealings with 'the Professor', a creator figure that Spiller has likened to the 'Juggler' or 'Handler of Gravity' in Marcel Duchamp's writings on The Bride Stripped Bare by Her Bachelors, Even (1915–23). Spiller has likened both the Boy and the Professor to himself and this is suggested in his prose. For example, the Professor is written as wearing cowboy boots and Spiller has mentioned that the Boy is asthmatic, with both being features of Spiller's own character. He describes the Professor as mad and 'idiot savant', a representation of himself in the present. The Boy is Spiller as a child and is described as an 'unreliable narrator' who does not understanding the surreal landscape in which he trespasses.

=== The Professor's Study ===
The design of the Professor's Study reflects one of the core functions of the Communicating Vessels project, that of mnemonics. All the Island, but especially the Study, are examples of the method of loci: allowing Spiller to contain within his project a catalogue of his creative influences. He has named Vittore Carpaccio's Saint Augustine in his Study (1502), Dalí's Dalí Seen from the Back Painting Gala from the Back Eternalised by Six Virtual Corneas Provisionally Reflected by Six Real Mirrors (1972–73), Cornelius Meyer's Dwelling for a Gentleman (1689) and Frederick Kiesler's triptych Les Larves d'Imagie d'Henri Robert Marcel Duchamp (1972–73) as the primary inspirations for this aspect of his project.

=== The Velázquez Machine ===
One of the earliest designs associated with Communicating Vessels is the Velázquez Mechine, named for the painter Diego Velázquez whose Las Meninas (1657) greatly inspired Spiller to depict his own creative process with the project. The Machine is unique as it is not situated on the Island of Vessels; instead, it hangs in the Musée de l'Orangerie, in the Tuileries Garden, Paris. Spiller describes the Machine as oscillating to create a series of vectors which inform the trajectories of sculptures and the planting of vista on the Island. The drawing includes a fried egg hanging from a plumb line—an allusion to Salvador Dalí's Œufs sur le Plat sans le Plat (1932)—and references Spanish vernacular painting more generally.

=== The Wheelbarrow with Expanding Bread ===
One such sculpture on the Island remotely controlled by the Velázquez Machine is the Wheelbarrow with Expanding Bread. The design of the sculpture is inspired by Hector Guimard's Art Nouveau metro stations in Paris and Dalí's paranoiac-critical reading of them as evoking praying mantes. The Wheelbarrow also references Dalí's painting The Wheelbarrow (1951), which Spiller regards as being inspired by Ferdinand Cheval's Palais Idéal—a key piece of Surrealist architecture, discussed at length in Spiller's book Architecture and Surrealism (2016).

=== The Genetic Gazebo ===
The Genetic Gazebo was conceived by Spiller with reference to the second-order cyberneticist Gordon Pask, who taught at the AA in the 1970s and 1980s. Spiller became inspired by the dendritic architecture of a self-wiring ear Pask engineered in 1951. Another inspiration was the notion of harvesting DNA from prehistoric insects suspended in amber, coming to think of this as a possible input to the Gazebo. Another such input was conceived of as being the DNA of Spiller's childhood pet, a gerbil called Micky who died in 1976. Part of the Gazebo is a birdbath which functions as another input. These inputs inform the creation of what Spiller terms 'psycho-atmospheric objects', with reference to Dalí. The Gazebo is characterised by a 4 × 4, 16-point electrical array which is conditioned by switching between these various inputs.

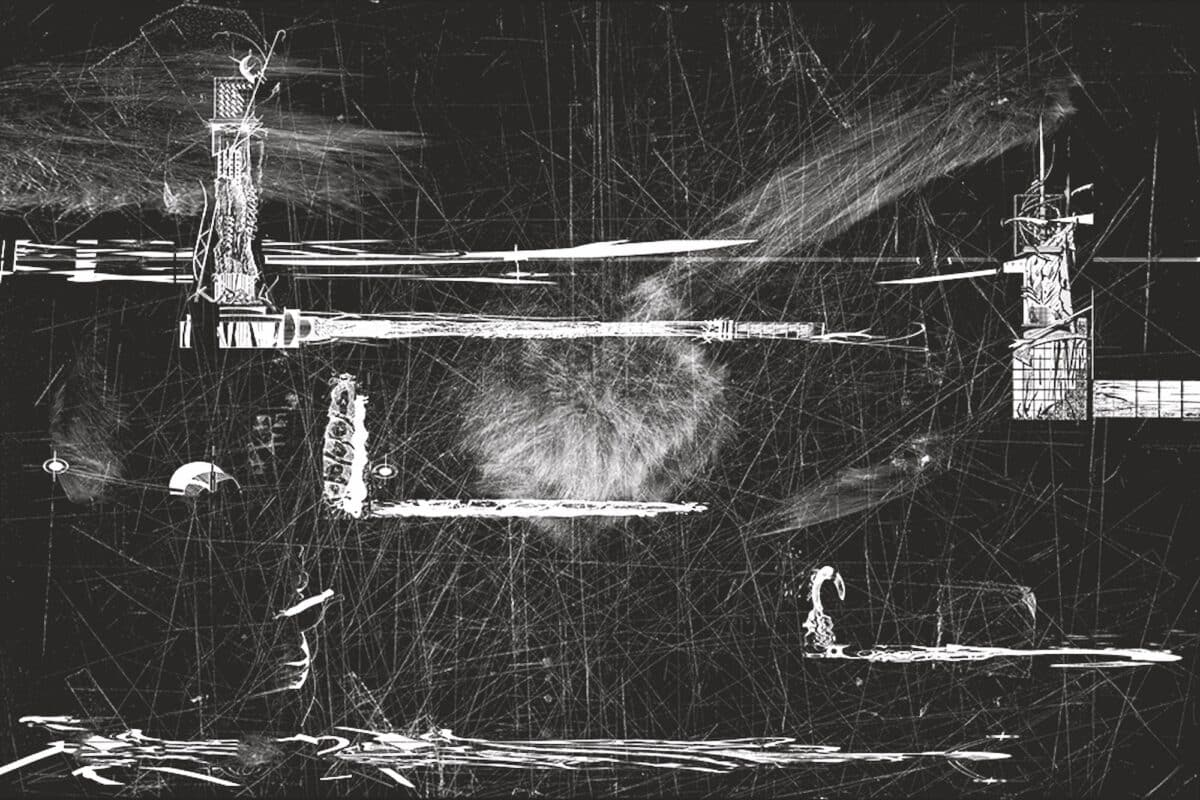
Neil Spiller, Virtual Objects and their Virtual Shadows: Walled Garden for Lebbeus (Garden Removed) (2013)

=== The Walled Garden for Lebbeus ===
Woods, a greatly inspirational figure to Spiller, and later his friend, died in 2012, triggering a major phase in Communicating Vessels. Spiller produced many works based on his memories of Woods at this time, such as a series of approximately 25 drawings titled 'Walled Garden for Lebbeus' (2013). The design of the Garden partially references Aldo Rossi's Cataldo Cemetery.

The Garden is presided over by a statue of Electra: the back of the statue's head is missing, within it, a storm can be seen and heard. In one sense, this detail is given in reference to Hurricane Sandy that raged in New York City the day of Woods's death; in another, the storm is an example of augmented reality, a key research area of Spiller's during his career at The Bartlett. For Spiller, augmented and virtual reality presented a revolutionary prospect for architecture, that of a blank canvas where the laws of physics are more easily circumvented.

Another key feature of the Garden on the Island of Vessels is a conical frustum, divided into two chambers: one upper, the other lower. The design of the upper chamber is an homage to Giovanni Battista Pirenesi's plate IX, Carceri d'invenzione (c. 1745–50) and Arnold Böcklin's Isle of the Dead (1883). The lower chamber is linked to the upper, and the movements of components in its upper half create a corresponding image in the lower, that of an evocation of the myth of Leda and the Swan. Often the frustum is shown to be casting two shadows.

The final drawing in the series, Walled Garden for Lebbeus (Gold) (2013), was shown as part of the RA's Summer Exhibition in 2015.

=== The Longhouse ===
In 2015, Spiller began to design the Professor's house, called the Longhouse. Spiller visualises the space as a prytaneion on the Island of Vessels, where the internal logics of Spiller's world are at their most schizophrenic. Spiller writes that the Longhouse began as simply the designs for a set of cast bronze doors, embossed with Surreal symbols, drawn with reference to Auguste Rodin's The Gates of Hell and Lorenzo Ghiberti's Porta Nord del Battistero (1403–24).

The Longhouse's form is ever-changing, it is reflexive in relationship to its site, its versions programmed by a chunking engine called the Chicken Computer, a mechanical instrument that senses and adapts to its physical and virtual environment. A core organisational feature of the Longhouse's ever-changing design is that it is centred on a horizontal axis, dividing it in half. In reference to the Surrealist preoccupation with mannequins, the Longhouse contains a Hall of Dummies.

When, in 2019, Spiller's close friend and frequent collaborator Vaughan Oliver died, Spiller set about memorialising him in an augmented reality roof garden for the Longhouse, as he had done for Woods elsewhere on the Island.

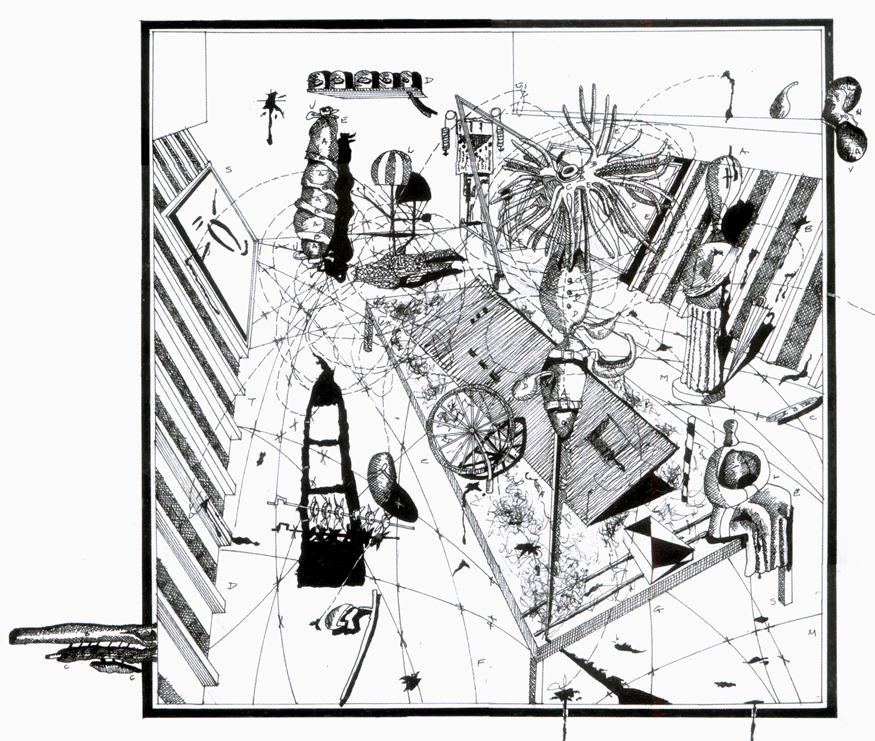
Neil Spiller, Dee Stool (Miniature Pataphysical Laboratory) (2003).

=== The Dee Stools ===
The Dee Stools (or Trunks) are Spiller's response to the Elizabethan court alchemist John Dee and the fact that he is reported to have hidden his texts in a chest. The Stools are likely surreal redesigns of the fishing stools along the River Stour that Spiller remembers from his youth. They are six in number and covered by a 'Futurist cloak', in reference to F. T. Marinetti's Sudan–Parigi (1921).

Within the Stools are miniature Pataphysical laboratories. In his writings and lectures, Spiller often mentions they are 'three buttocks' in width. The Stools contain a painting machine in reference to Jarry's depiction of a clinamen as a painting machine in Exploits and Opinions of Dr. Faustroll, Pataphysician (published posthumously, 1911). According to Spiller, other allusions are made to Georgio de Chirico's The Disturbing Muses (1925), as well as the teeth paver and artificial lips from Raymond Roussel's novel Locus Solus (1914). Most visible are the allusions to Duchamp's Bicycle Wheel (1951), Étant donnés (1966) as well as the 'draught pistons' from The Large Glass.

The painting machine within the Stools is designed to splatter paint onto Surrealist poetry, creating new permutational verses determined by which lines are touched by the paint. This is a reference to the writing techniques associated with the Oulipo sub-sect of Pataphysicians.

=== The Baroness ===
The Baroness is an id-like ruler the Island of Vessels and is an homage to the Dadaist artist Elsa von Freytag-Loringhoven, whose sculpture God (1917) is a major influence on Spiller, cited regularly in his lectures. The Baroness is also partially inspired by the Bride of Duchamp's The Large Glass, both being characterised by electromagnetic filaments.

=== Holy gasoline ===
The Island of Vessels is characterised by reflexive technological elements, which cybernetically correspond. Spiller imagines this space as being powered by a nanotechnological grease, made up of protocells, which is also referred to as 'holy gasoline' in his writings. 'Holy gasoline' is an allusion Zodiac Mindwarp and the Love Reaction's 1988 song of the same name. The material is flammable and drawn to the Baroness.

=== Prose style ===
The prose associated with Spiller's Vessels project is as referential as his drawings but a smaller proportion of it is published. In a lecture delivered at the Southern California Institute of Architecture (SCI-Arc) in 2008, he read frequently from his writings on the Island of Vessels. In the below passage, Spiller alludes to Freytag-Loringhoven's sculpture God, the Vorticist movement and Jacob Epstein's Rock Drill (1916):

The Professor stood before us in a quiet and considered way. He spoke of extraordinary things. He motioned behind him to what looked like a robotic lynching hanging from a strange, otherworldly bower. He told us the sad story of Baroness and Pinky—the mutt-swine, the shittenhound. He lived nearly a hundred Hogmanays ago in the city of collapsing towers. The Baroness blew holy gasoline and even at one point lived next to his non-retinal swiftness. She was known to light her tail with a taillight and smelled and put her tits into tomato cans and wrote of her cast iron lover.

He bade us forward, asking us to be careful. Birds called in the hedgerows, it was such a fine day. We got closer to the Baroness, we admired her cathedral, her feather, her porcupine spine eyelashes and her circle of woman, and marvelled at the U-bend of God.

Then with a far off gaze, the Professor spoke of the Glass of two halves: one full of chocolate and cemeteries and the other with the cracked and cacked bride. He told us of masculine vibration and the baleful bachelors. He gathered himself up to his average height and, with all the theatricality he could muster, he said 'ladies, gentlemen, actuators and surveillance paraphernalia, including geostats, for your predilection I give to you a vertiginous Vorticist Rock Drill, driven to teetering ecstasy by the Baroness's glandular gasoline and her weapons of mass distraction'.

Spiller has mentioned his predilection for 'purple prose' in his both his academic and creative writing, likely in response to Surrealist prose. Many of the titles of his works bare resemblance to the long titles of many Surreal art pieces, for example The Baroness's Filaments Caressing the Bulb of the Wheelbarrow with Expanding Bread Under the Disapproving Composite Eye of a Wasp (2008).

== Personal life ==
In 1997, Spiller married the novelist Melissa Jones, who at the time was working as Sir Peter Cook and Christine Hawley's personal assistant at The Bartlett. They have two children. Spiller and Jones divorced in 2012.

Spiller was close friends with the graphic designer Vaughan Oliver. The two first worked together on Spiller's monograph, Maverick Deviations. In 2016, Spiller exhibited Oliver's album covers commissioned for the Pixies at the University of Greenwich's Stephen Lawrence Gallary. In 2018, Spiller and Oliver intended to collaborate on a book which collected the drawings of the Communicating Vessels project. Oliver died the following year and the project was cancelled. In 2023, Spiller provided the back cover art for the 2024 re-release of Pixies at the BBC, 1988–91 (originally released in 1998).

== Select bibliography ==
Books
| Year | Title | Publisher | ISBN | Pages | Notes |
|---|---|---|---|---|---|
| 1990 | Burning Whiteness, Plump Black Lines: A Search for Architectural Language | Spiller Farmer Publications | 978-0-9516195-0-6 | 20 | |
| 1998 | Digital Dreams – Architecture and the Alchemic Technologies | Ellipsis | 978-0-8230-1352-4 | 156 | |
| 1999 | The Power of Contemporary Architecture | Wiley | 978-0-471-98419-1 | 125 | Co-authored with Sir Peter Cook. |
| 2001 | The Paradox of Contemporary Architecture | Wiley | 978-0-471-49685-4 | 128 | Co-authored with Sir Peter Cook, Laura Allen and Peg Rawes. |
| 2002 | Cyberreader: Critical Writings of the Digital Era | Phaidon Press | 978-0-7148-4071-0 | 320 | |
| 2002 | Lost Architectures | Wiley | 978-0-471-49535-2 | 128 | |
| 2006 | Visionary Architecture: Blueprints of the Modern Imagination | Thames & Hudson | 978-0-500-28655-5 | 272 | |
| 2007 | Future City: Experiment and Utopia in Architecture | Thames & Hudson | 978-0-500-28651-7 | 336 | Co-edited with Jane Alison, Marie-Ange Brayer and Frédéric Migayrou. |
| 2008 | Digital Architecture Now: A Global Survey of Emerging Talent | Thames & Hudson | 978-0-500-34247-3 | 400 | |
| 2009 | Bartlett Designs: Speculating with Architecture | Wiley | 978-0-470-68283-8 | 256 | Co-edited with Ian Borden and Laura Allen. |
| 2014 | Educating Architects: How Tomorrow's Practitioners Will Learn Today | Thames & Hudson | 978-0-500-34300-5 | 352 | Co-authored with Nic Clear. |
| 2016 | Surrealism and Architecture: A Blistering Romance | Thames & Hudson | 978-0-500-34320-3 | 256 | |
| 2016 | Negative Equality: House Projects | AVATAR Editions | 978-0-9935909-0-0 | 63 | Co-authored with Nic Clear. |
| 2020 | How to Thrive in Architecture School: A Student Guide | RIBA Publishing | 978-1-85946-908-8 | 178 | |

=== Journal issues as guest editor ===
- Architects in Cyberspace, with Martin Pearce, Architectural Design, profile no. 118 (1995)
- Integrating Architecture, Architectural Design, profile no. 123 (1996)
- Maverick Deviations: Architectural Works, Neil Spiller (1981–1998), Architectural Design, profile no. 53 (1998)
- Architects in Cyberspace II, Architectural Design (1998)
- Young Blood, Architectural Design (2001)
- Reflexive Architecture, Architectural Design, vol. 81, no. 2 (2002)
- Growing a Hidden Architecture, with Rachel Armstrong, Technoetic Arts Journal (2009)
- Plectic Architecture: Towards a Theory of Post Digital Architecture, with Rachel Armstrong, Technoetic Arts Journal, vol. 7, no. 2 (2009)
- Alternative Ecologies, Organs Everywhere, no. 2 (2011)
- Protocell Architecture, with Rachel Armstrong, Architectural Design, no. 2 (2011)
- Drawing Architecture, Architectural Design, vol. 83, no. 5 (2013)
- The Magical Architecture in Drawing Drawings, Journal of Architectural Education, vol. 67, no. 2 (2017)
- Celebrating the Marvellous: Surrealism in Architecture, Architectural Design, vol. 88, no. 2 (2018)

== Awards ==
- 1987: RIBA President's Silver Medal Nominee, Royal Institute of British Architects.
- 1992: Green Book Award for Architectural Works, University of Central England.
- 2016: RIBAJ Eye Line competition winner, Royal Institute of British Architects.
- 2017: RIBAJ Eye Line competition honourable mention, Royal Institute of British Architects.

== Select exhibitions ==
- Schizophrenia: The Architecture of Column and Screen (London: Dryden Street Gallery, 1987)
- Theory and Experimentation (London: Royal Institute of British Architects; Royal Academy of Arts, 1992)
- Digital Architecture Now (London: Barbican Centre, 2008)
- AVATAR (London: Lobby Gallery, University College London, 2009)
- World Architecture Festival Exhibition (Barcelona: Centro de Convenciones Internacional de Barcelona, 2009)
- London Design Festival (London: Victoria and Albert Museum, 2010)
- Drawing by Drawing (Copenhagen: Danish Architecture Centre, 2012)
- Royal Academy Summer Exhibition (London: Royal Academy of Arts, 2015)
- Negative Equity (London: Project Space, University of Greenwich, 2016)
- Royal Academy Summer Exhibition (London: Royal Academy of Arts, 2016)
- Future Cities 6 (London: Stephen Lawrence Gallery, University of Greenwich, 2017)
- Extreme Dreams (Ithica: John Hartell Gallery, Cornell University, 2017)
- Drawing Attention - Private View (London: Betts Project, 2019)
- Re-Imagining the Avant-Garde (London: Betts Project, 2019)
- Communicating Vessels (Ottawa: Lightroom Gallery, Carleton University, 2020)
- Drawing Conversations (New York City: a83, 2022; Montreal: Design Centre, Université du Québec à Montréal, 2022)
- Impossible Drawings (Los Angeles: A+D Museum, 2024)
- The Sixth Somewhat Annual Meeting (New York City: a83, 2025)
