= Melissa Jones (writer) =

English writer (born 1965)

- Born: Melissa Lucy Jones; 22 March 1965 (age 61); London, England
- Education: Exeter College, Oxford
- Occupation: Writer
- Spouse: Neil Spiller (m. 1997; div. 2012)
- Children: 2
- Father: Evan Jones
- Relatives: Sadie Jones (sister); Ken Jones (uncle); Fred M. Jones (grandfather)
- Writing career
- Years active: 1998–present
- Genres: Novel; Non-fiction; journalism
- Website: melissajoneswriter.com

Melissa Lucy Jones (born 22 March 1965) is an English writer based in East Sussex. She is the author of four novels and a book on interior design. She is best known for her third novel, The Hidden Heart of Emily Hudson (2010).

== Early life and education ==
Jones was born in London and grew up with her sister, Sadie Jones, in World's End, Chelsea. Her parents were Evan Jones, a Jamaican scriptwriter and poet, and Joanna (née Napper), an English actress whose stage name was Joanna Vogel. Jones recalls first reading Charlotte Brontë's Jane Eyre (1847) at the age of eight and Leo Tolstoy's Anna Karenina (1878) at 11. She expressed that 19th-century novels "form[ed] the backbone" of her literary education. Jones also wrote and illustrated screenplays aged seven. As an undergraduate, she read English literature and language at Exeter College, Oxford.

== Novels ==
Jones's first novel was Cold in Earth, which follows the television personality Zoë Warren who, at 46, unexpectedly becomes pregnant with a daughter, Beth. When Beth dies, Zoë is emotionally devastated. The novel, told from the perspectives of three journals belonging to different members of the Warren family, depicts Zoë's descent into madness, slowly revealing the true circumstances of Beth's death as it does so. Kirkus Reviews described this descent as "meticulous: bleakness embraced and transmuted into drama by a writer at the top of her craft", deeming the novel "a remarkably well-done first effort" and "near-brilliant".

While residing in Castle Hedingham, Essex, Jones wrote her third novel,The Hidden Heart of Emily Hudson, published as Emily Hudson in the United States and Canada. The narrative follows the eponymous character, orphaned by tuberculosis and sent to live with an uncle in Newport, Rhode Island, at the outbreak of the American Civil War. The sensitive Emily, with her pretensions of being an artist, is dismissed by her uncle who wishes to rid himself of her through marriage. When her engagement to the eligible Captain Lindsey fails, Emily's aesthete cousin William offers her an escape to England. However, William becomes an obsessively controlling patron of Emily's and she plans to set out on her own for Rome. Of this plot, in Publishers Weekly it was written that "Jones skillfully moves her heroine from freewheeling and childlike to cautious and deceptive and back again". The Hidden Heart of Emily Hudson was described in The Independent as "a wonderful book".

The relationship between Emily and William is modelled after that of Henry James and his muse, Minny Temple. Jones was inspired by Lyndall Gordon's text A Private Life of Henry James: Two Women and His Art (1998). Gordon's book quotes Temple's correspondences at length, inspiring the epistolary style of Jones's novel.

After seven years of writing, during which time she moved to Northiam, East Sussex, Jones released her fourth novel, Gone for a Soldier. The novel was published in 2026 by The Authors' Collective, a publishing cooperative established the same year and of which Jones is a co-founder. She has referenced Henry James's The Turn of the Screw (1898) and the work of Ruth Rendell and P. D. James as an influence on the novel.

== Bibliography ==
Year	Title	Publisher	ISBN	Pages	Notes
1998	Cold in Earth	Orion	978-0-7528-1336-3	224	Novel.
1999	Sick and Heart	Orion	978-0-7528-1415-5	232	Novel.
2005	Interiors for Under 5s	Wiley	978-0-470-09333-7	216	Non-fiction.
2010	The Hidden Heart of Emily Hudson	Sphere	978-0-7515-4280-6	360	Novel.
2026	Gone for a Soldier	The Authors' Collective	978-1-0685-2732-6	252	Novel.

== Personal life ==
She worked as Sir Peter Cook and Christine Hawley's personal assistant at The Bartlett, University College London (UCL), where she met the professor and architect Neil Spiller. The two were married in 1997, have two children and divorced in 2012.
