= Quentin Crewe =

English journalist (1926–1998)

- Born: Quentin Hugh Dodds; 14 November 1926; London, England
- Died: 14 November 1998 (aged 72); Chipping Norton, Oxfordshire, England
- Occupations: Author, journalist, adventurer

Quentin Hugh Crewe (14 November 1926 – 14 November 1998) was an English journalist, author, restaurateur and adventurer. He wrote regularly for the Evening Standard, Queen magazine, the Daily Mail and Sunday Mirror, among others. Crewe travelled much of the world, writing 11 books on the subject of his journeys, biographies and cuisine, including an expedition to the "empty quarter" of Saudi Arabia. Crewe was co-proprietor of various restaurants, including the now-defunct Brasserie St. Quentin in Knightsbridge, London.

== Early life ==
Crewe was born Quentin Hugh Dodds in 1926, the second son of Major (James) Hugh Hamilton Dodds, CMG, a career diplomat (amongst other postings, Consul-General at Nice), and Lady Annabel Crewe-Milnes, the daughter of the Marquess of Crewe. In 1945 his family changed their name to Crewe after his mother inherited what remained of Lord Crewe's estates. His older half-brother, Terence O'Neill, was a politician who served as the Prime Minister of Northern Ireland from 1963 to 1969.

Crewe was diagnosed with muscular dystrophy at age 6 and a doctor predicted he would be dead by 16 years old. He was not told this. His father was keen that he should be a sportsman, and tried to teach him to shoot, fence or ride, without any success. Crewe would regularly fall over.

During Crewe's early childhood, his father was British Consul in Sicily, before being transferred to the French Riviera when his friendship with Haile Selassie made it impossible to remain in Italy. With his parents living abroad, Quentin spent much of his childhood in the care of various relatives in England. He was educated at Eton, where he was expelled after copying a fire door key and secretly going to London for a day. He went on to Trinity College, Cambridge to study law and economics, but spent so much time partying that he was expelled for indolence. He was falling over so much that he took to walking with a stick, although he did achieve sporting success as a cox. Crewe's condition steadily deteriorated until he was using a wheelchair full-time by age 29.

Crewe was married three times: in 1956, to Martha Sharp, with whom he had a son and a daughter; in 1961, to Angela Huth, with whom he had a son and a daughter; and in 1970, to Sue Cavendish, with whom he had a son and a daughter.

== Career ==
Crewe is credited with inventing the modern restaurant review, which is not only about the food but aims to entertain as well as inform. He notoriously described Wilton's restaurant on Jermyn Street as where the aristocracy were served nursery food by waitresses dressed as nannies.

== Recognition ==
Crewe appeared as a castaway on the BBC Radio programme Desert Island Discs twice, on 21 January 1984, and on 16 June 1996.

== Books ==
- A Curse of Blossom: A year in Japan (1960)
- The Frontiers of Privilege. A Century of Social Conflict as reflected in The Queen (1961)
- Great Chefs of France: The Masters of Haute Cuisine and their Secrets, with Anthony Blake (1978)
- Quentin Crewe's International Pocket Food Book (1980)
- The Simon and Schuster International Pocket Food Guide (1980)
- In Search of the Sahara (1983)
- The Last Maharaja: A Biography of Sawai Man Singh Li, Maharaja of Jaipur (1985)
- Touch the Happy Isles: Journey Through the Caribbean (1987)
- In the Realms of Gold: Travels through South America (1989)
- Well, I Forget The Rest: The Autobiography of an Optimist (1991)
- Food from France (1993)
- Crewe House: The Royal Embassy of Saudi Arabia (1995)
- Letters from India (1998)
