= Felipe Correa =

Ecuadorian architect (born 1976)

- Born: 21 August 1976 (age 50); Quito, Ecuador
- Education: Harvard Graduate School of Design, Tulane University
- Occupation: Architect
- Practice: Somatic Collaborative, South America Project
- Projects: Neapolitan Housing (Porto Alegre, Brazil) Perched House (Kassel, Germany), Urban Impact Study for the Metro de Quito (Ecuador), Mobility Infrastructure Study for Mexico City (Mexico)

Felipe Correa (born 21 August 1976) is an Ecuadorian architect, urbanist and author based in New York. He is the founder and managing partner of the design practice Somatic Collaborative.

He previously served as the Vincent and Eleanor Shea Professor at the University of Virginia School of Architecture. He also previously served as faculty at Harvard Graduate School of Design as an assistant professor (2008–2012), associate professor (2012–2018), and as director of the Master of Architecture in Urban Design (MAUD) program (2009–2018). Correa's writing, research, and design work have been widely published and exhibited.

== Early life and career ==
Correa was born and raised in Quito, Ecuador. In 1995 he moved to New Orleans, Louisiana where he attended Tulane University for a Bachelor of Architecture. Shortly thereafter, he moved to Cambridge, Massachusetts where he attended Harvard University and graduated with a Master of Architecture in Urban Design degree from the Graduate School of Design. Since then, Correa has split his time between Charlottesville, New York, and Quito.

=== Academic career ===
Correa's academic work focuses on expanding the role of design in creating spatial synthesis across different scales and geographies of the built environment. While at Harvard, Correa worked with sponsors from the public and private sectors to develop multiple lines of research looking at specific contemporary case studies of fast-paced urbanization. The publication of several significant applied research and design monographs related specifically to this work include the urban impact study for the new underground metro currently under construction in Quito (A Line in the Andes; Harvard University Graduate School of Design, 2012), a study of the current state of mobility infrastructure for Mexico City (Mexico City: Beyond Geometry and Geography: AR+D, 2015) and, most recently, a comprehensive study and proposal for the transformation of inner-city postindustrial land in São Paulo, Brazil to new, centrally located affordable housing districts (São Paulo: A Graphic Biography; University of Texas Press 2018).

Correa is also the author of Beyond the City: Resource Extraction Urbanism in South America (University of Texas Press, 2016). The book ties together a series of architectural models of often-overlooked sites outside the traditional South American city. Implementing the term "resource extraction urbanism," Correa critically assesses five key urban and territorial projects in South America in the last century, providing a historical account of resource extraction in developing the region and re-framing the role of the "architect-planner" in relation to current regional initiatives underway throughout continent.

=== Design practice ===
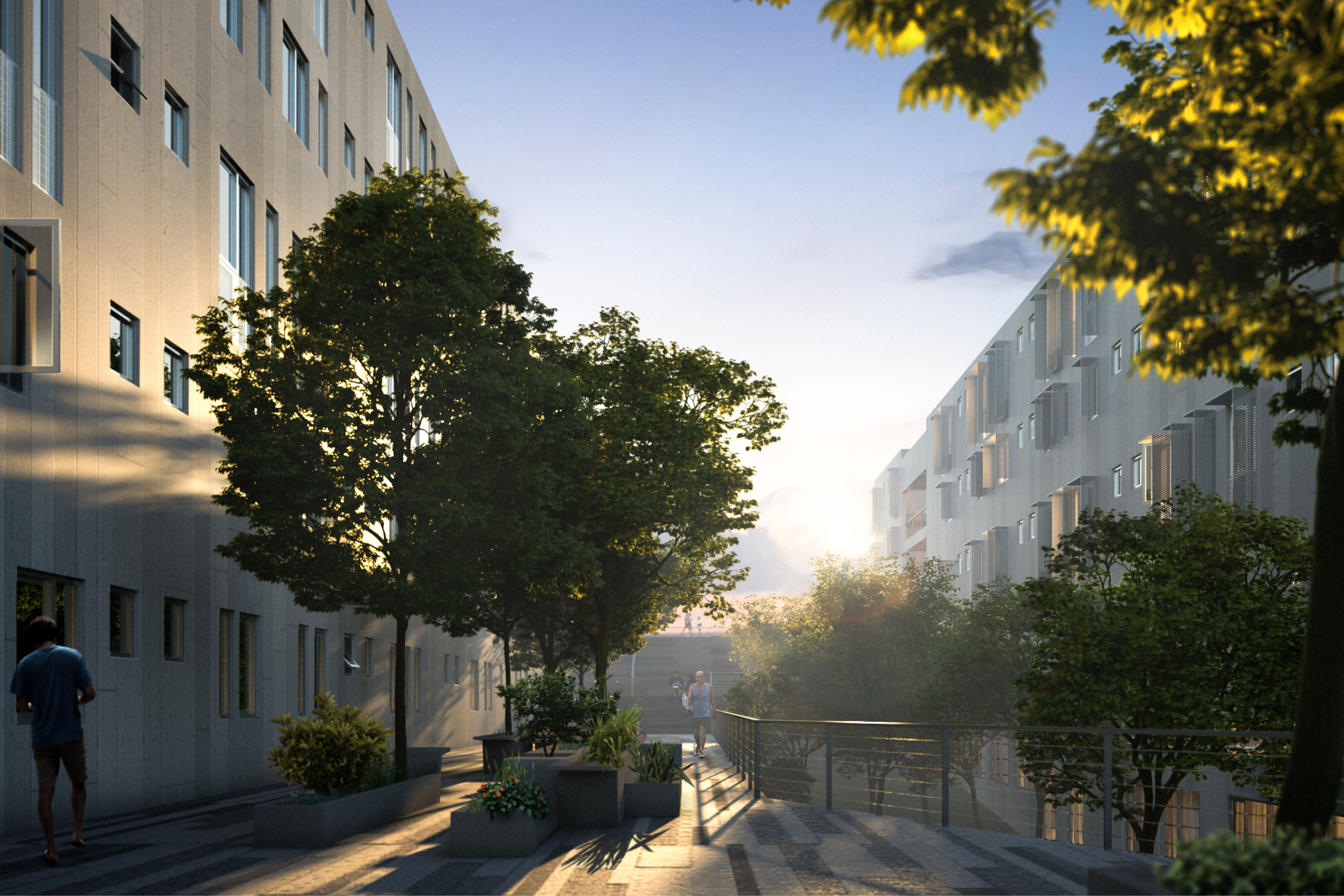
Neapolitan Icecream Inspired Felipe Correa (Somatic Collaborative) Porto Alegre, Brazil

In 2006, Correa co-founded the Somatic Collaborative (with Anthony Acciavatti), which he still manages today. Working across disciplines and spatial scales, Somatic Collaborative operates at the confluence of Architecture, Landscape, Urbanism, and Infrastructure. Through Somatic, Correa has developed projects for various organizations, both from the public and private sectors, throughout the world. Most recently Somatic has worked in Kassel, Monterrey, Porto Alegre, Quito, São Paulo, Rio de Janeiro, and Seoul. Somatic Collaborative conceives design as a mediator across multiple scales of the build environment. Some of Correa's most recent design projects include the Perched House and the Neapolitan Residential and Co-Working Complex. Sited in the outskirts of Kassel (Germany), the Perched House is an experimental home designed as part of the Ways of Life program for Documenta 14, that investigates new relationships between domestic space, remote working, and new connections to nature. The Neapolitan Complex in Porto Alegre, Brazil examines how affordable housing can become the epicenter of new mixed-use and mixed income districts in South American intermediate scale cities.

Selected projects

- Perched House, (Kassel, Germany, 2017)
- Housing and Co-working Complex, (Gravatai, Brazil, 2016–present)
- Plaza República, (Quito, Ecuador, competition – finalist 2011)
- Magok Waterfront and Mixed-use District, (Seoul, South Korea)

== Publications and books ==
A selection of books written and co-written by Correa:

São Paulo: A Graphic Biography (2018) ISBN 978-1477316276

In São Paulo: A Graphic Biography, Correa presents a comprehensive portrait of Brazil's largest city, narrating its fast-paced growth through archival material, photography, analytical drawings, and text. Additional essays from scholars in fields such as landscape architecture, ecology, governance, and public health offer a series of interdisciplinary perspectives on the city's history and development.

Beyond the city: Resource Extraction Urbanism in South America (2017) ISBN 978-1477309414

Within the context of South America's recent push towards transnational integration, Correa analyzes the spatial imperatives brought by the Initiative for the Integration of the Regional Infrastructure of South America. Providing much-needed historical contextualization to IIRSA's agenda, Beyond the City ties together a series of spatial models and offers a survey of regional strategies in five case studies of often overlooked sites built outside the traditional South American urban constructs. Implementing the term “resource extraction urbanism,” Correa takes us from Brazil's nineteenth-century regional capital city of Belo Horizonte to the experimental, circular, “temporary” city of Vila Piloto in Três Lagoas. In Chile, he surveys the mining town of María Elena. In Venezuela, he explores petrochemical encampments at Judibana and El Tablazo, as well as new industrial frontiers at Ciudad Guayana. The result is both a cautionary tale, bringing to light a history of societies that were “inscribed” and administered, and a perceptive examination of the agency of architecture and urban planning in shaping South American lives.

Mexico City: Between Geometry and Geography (2014) ISBN 978-1940743080

(with Carlos Garciavelez Alfaro) Utilizing visual representation in the form of photography, maps, archival material, and various other analytical diagrams, Correa traces the historic urbanization and evolution of Mexico City. Specifically this book aims to examine the relationship between past public works projects and the modern day urban fabric of the city.

A Line in the Andes (2012) ISBN 978-1934510346

Following one year of investigation, Correa depicts a visual and analytical representation of the urban transformations in Quito, Ecuador that resulted from the city's implementation of its first underground metro line.

Cities: X Lines-A New Lens for the Urbanistic Project (2006) ISBN 978-8884472946

(with Joan Busquets) Busquets and Correa outline the specific methods, tools, and lenses that current designers are utilizing as they shape and develop today's cities. Intertwining methods with case studies throughout the world, the authors paints a vivid picture of how design frameworks have shifted over the past 30 years.
