= The Architect's Newspaper =

Newspaper in New York City

- Cover of the May 2024 issue
- Executive Editor: Jack Murphy
- Former editors: William Menking
- Categories: Architecture
- Frequency: Monthly
- Circulation: 50,000
- Publisher: Diana Darling
- Founded: 2003
- Country: United States
- Based in: New York City
- Language: English
- Website: www.archpaper.com
- ISSN: 1552-8081

The Architect's Newspaper is an architectural publication that covers the United States in monthly printed issues and online. The paper was founded in 2003 by William Menking, editor-in-chief, and Diana Darling, publisher, to bring architects and designers news relevant to architects, designers, engineers, landscape architects, lighting designers, interior designers, academics, developers, contractors, and other parties interested in the built urban environment.

Content both in print and online ranges from a mix of topical essays, opinionated columns, project analyses, firm profiles, interviews, new products, reviews of exhibitions and books, a gossip column, plus an updated calendar of important events and competitions. Today, the paper is often referred to as ‘AN’ –the letters of which are depicted in its logotype. It has been praised for "balanced and accessible" coverage, although its target audience is architects and design professionals.

== History ==
When first launched in 2003, The Architect’s Newspaper featured news only relating to the architecture scene on the East Coast and in particular, New York, which was where the company was (and still is) based. From 2003 to 2016, The Architect's Newspaper ran three regional print editions covering the East Coast, Midwest, and West Coast–each on a monthly basis. A South West edition was also printed, though not at regular intervals. In 2016, the paper opted to print only national editions which are now published every month. In 2015, The Architect’s Newspaper launched AN Interior to run alongside the paper's print format. As denoted in its name the publication focused particularly on interior design. Editions are published four times a year and take on a more magazine-type style in comparison to the paper.

== Events and awards programs ==
Aside from print and online journalism, The Architect’s Newspaper runs a series of events and awards programs.

=== Conferences ===
Facades+ Started in 2012 and is a two-day long conference that seeks to address all things building skin. The conference runs on average 4 times a year and is hosted around the U.S.

Facades+ AM Started in 2014 and condenses the Facades+ conference into a morning session. The conference runs on average 3 times a year and is also hosted around the U.S.

Tech+ Started in 2016 and is a conference that focuses on technology use within the field of architecture. The conference currently runs once a year.

=== Awards programs ===
AN Best of Design Awards has been running since 2012. The awards program aims to recognize success in architecture within the U.S. Awards are divided into multiple categories ranging from: Winners for best building by region (East, West, Midwest, and Southwest) and typology; urbanism; adaptive re-use; architectural lighting; drawings; renders; landscape architecture; facades, as well as young architect and student work.

AN Best of Product Awards has been running since 2014. The awards program aims to recognize design excellence for products that serve an architectural purpose or can be used within the realm of architecture. Awards are divided into multiple categories ranging from components for: Facades; structure; openings; lighting and electrical fittings; surfaces and finishes; interior furnishings; outdoor furnishings; kitchens and baths.

== Awards ==
- 2006 NYC Small Business Award
- 2007 AIA NY Oculus Award for Excellence in Architecture and Design Journalism
- 2010 AIA Institute Honor for Collaborative Achievement
- 2010 Society for Marketing Professional Services New York Chapter (SMPS-NY) Media Award
- 2011 Friend from the Media Award, for covering "important neighborhood preservation issues such the proposed redevelopment of St. Vincent’s Hospital, the tower proposal at 980 Madison Avenue and the future of Coney Island in depth".
- 2012 American Society of Landscape Architects New York Chapter (ASLA NY) President's Award for Promoting the Profession
