= Architectural Design =

UK-based architectural journal

Cover of Architectural Design Vol 58 No. 5/6 1988

Architectural Design, also known as AD, is a New York-based architectural publication first launched in the UK, in 1930, as Architectural Design and Construction. The publication is currently led from New York by Editorial Director Ashley Simone. Neil Spiller was Editor from 2018-2025.

== History ==
In its early days, the journal was more concerned with the British architectural scene, but it gradually became more international in scope. In 1946 Monica Pidgeon became editor and developed the magazine under the ownership of Standard Catalogue Company. Contributors during the 1960s included Theo Crosby and Kenneth Frampton.

Over time, the journal moved away from news coverage towards theme-based issues. During the late 1970s and 1980s it was a bastion of Postmodernism, with frequent articles and special editions guest-edited by Charles Jencks, the theoretical father of postmodern architecture. At that time the journal was the mouthpiece of the publishers Academy Editions (marketed in the USA under St. Martins Press), based in Leinster Gardens, London (they also had their own bookstore), and they published very many well-known titles concerned with postmodernism. The long-standing Editor-in-Chief, until the mid-1980s, was Andreas Papadakis.

The content of the journal is seen during the latter half of its history as running parallel with the cutting edge of avant-gardism, promoting innovation as well as celebrity status – 'stararchitects'. Thus, at the height of Postmodernism in the late 1970s – when it often featured the works of Michael Graves, Robert Stern, Leon Krier, James Stirling, Robert Krier and Aldo Rossi – it also published Rem Koolhaas's later influential book Delirious New York (1979). An undercurrent to Postmodernism featured in the journal was that of "architecture without a style", a vernacular classical architecture, epitomised by the work of Quinlan Terry, Demetri Porphyrios and John Simpson.

The journal went partly into decline with the demise of postmodernism, though it then shifted its coverage towards Deconstructivism, folding in architecture, 'blob' architecture, biomorphism, and digital architecture. The shift in emphasis can be pinpointed to a single edition of the journal, devoted to the two polar positions at that time: "Peter Eisenman versus Leon Krier: 'My ideology is better than yours.'" ('Architectural Design', 9-10/1989). The current avant-gardist interest of the journal in biomorphism is a return to issues the journal was covering in the 1960s and 1970s, before posism, with the architecture of Archigram, Cedric Price and the thinking of Reyner Banham.
