= Black British people =

British people of sub-Saharan African descent

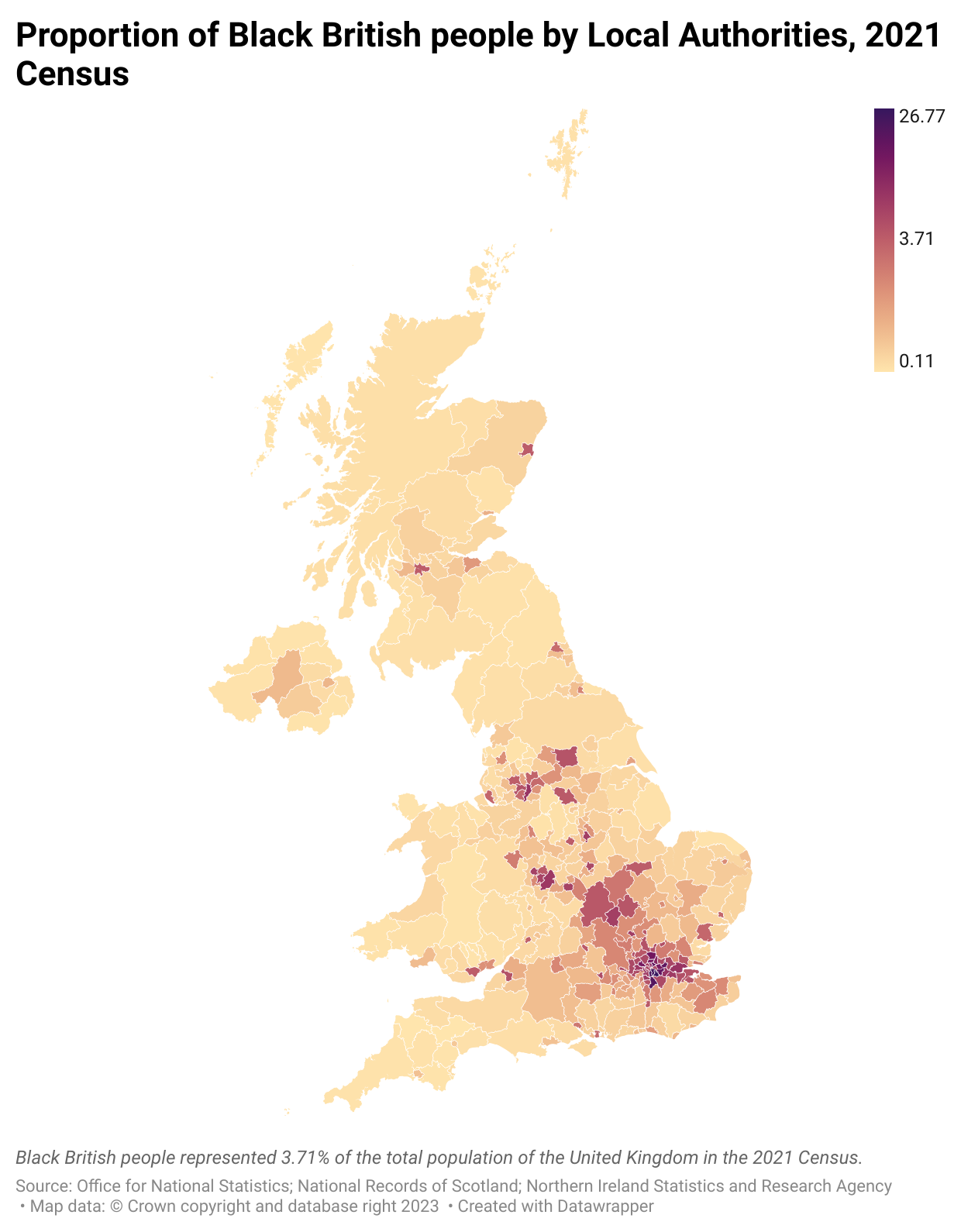
- A map of the UK showing the proportion of the Black population in 2021/2022.

Total population
- United Kingdom: 2,485,724 – 3.7% (2021/22 Census); England: 2,381,724 – 4.2% (2021); Scotland: 65,414 – 1.2% (2022) (Note: For the purpose of harmonising results to make them comparable across the United Kingdom, the ONS includes individuals in Scotland who classified themselves in the "African" category (58,636 people), which in the Scottish version of the census is separate from "Caribbean or Black" (6,778 people) in this "Black or Black British" category. The ONS note that "the African categories used in Scotland could potentially capture White/Asian/Other African in addition to Black identities".); Wales: 27,554 – 0.8% (2021); Northern Ireland: 11,032 – 0.6% (2021)

Regions with significant populations
- London; Birmingham; Manchester; Liverpool; Sheffield; Leeds; Nottingham; Coventry; Sandwell; Leicester; Glasgow; Edinburgh; Luton; Bristol; Cardiff; Newport; Swansea; Wolverhampton; Belfast

Languages
- English (British English, Black British English, Caribbean English, African English), Creole languages, French, Jamaican Patois, Nigerian Pidgin, Scottish English, and other languages

Religion
- Predominantly Christianity (66.9%); minority follows Islam (17.3%), other faiths (0.8%) (Note: Including Buddhism (0.1%), Hinduism (0.1%), Judaism (0.1%), Sikhism (0.01%) and others) or are irreligious (8.6%); 2021 census, NI, England and Wales only

Black British people, also referred to as Black Britons, are British people of Sub-Saharan African descent.

The term Black British developed in the 1950s, referring to the migrant populations from the former British colonies in the West Indies (sometimes referred to as the Windrush Generation) and West Africa, though it had been used to describe earlier populations from West Africa.

The term black has historically had a number of applications as a racial and political label. It may also be used in a wider sociopolitical context to encompass a broader range of non-European ethnic minority populations in Britain, though this usage has become less common over time. Black British is one of several self-designation entries used in official UK ethnicity classifications, with three main sub self-designation entries: "Black African", "Black Caribbean", or "other Black". However, many people still choose to self-identify as more specific ethnic or national groups such as British Nigerian or British Jamaican.

Around 3.7 per cent of the United Kingdom's population in 2021 were Black. The figures have increased from the 1991 census when 1.63 per cent of the population were recorded as Black or Black British to 1.15 million residents in 2001, or 2 per cent of the population, this further increased to just over 1.9 million in 2011, representing 3 per cent. Almost 96 per cent of Black Britons live in England, particularly in England's larger urban areas, with close to 1.2 million living in Greater London. 47.8% of the total Black British population live in London.

== Terminology ==
The term Black British most commonly refers to Black people from the Commonwealth of Nations, such as from the British West Indies or British West Africa. In the 1970s, a time of rising activism against racial discrimination, the term Black was also applied to people from the Indian subcontinent. Black was used in this inclusive political sense to mean "non–white British". (Note: Solidarity against racism and discrimination sometimes extended the term at that time to the Irish community in Britain as well.) For example, Southall Black Sisters was established in 1979 "to meet the needs of black (Asian and Afro-Caribbean) women". (Note: Note that "Asian" in the British context usually refers to people of South Asian ancestry.) Several organisations continue to use the term inclusively, such as the Black Arts Alliance, who extend their use of the term to Latin Americans and all refugees, and the National Black Police Association.

The official UK census has separate self-designation entries for respondents to identify as "Asian British", "Black British" and "Other ethnic group". Due to the Indian diaspora and in particular Idi Amin's expulsion of Asians from Uganda in 1972, many British Asians are from families that had previously lived for several generations in the British West Indies or the Comoros. A number of British Asians, including celebrities such as Riz Ahmed, still use the term "Black" and "Asian" interchangeably.

=== Census classification ===
The 1991 UK census was the first to include a question on ethnicity. As of the 2011 United Kingdom census, the Office for National Statistics (ONS) and the Northern Ireland Statistics and Research Agency (NISRA) allow people in England and Wales and Northern Ireland who self-identify as "Black" to select "Black African", "Black Caribbean" or "Any other Black/African/Caribbean background" tick boxes. For the 2011 Scottish census, the General Register Office for Scotland (GOS) also established new, separate "African, African Scottish or African British" and "Caribbean, Caribbean Scottish or Caribbean British" tick boxes for individuals in Scotland from Africa and the Caribbean, respectively, who do not identify as "Black, Black Scottish or Black British". The 2021 census in England and Wales maintained the African, Caribbean and any other Black, Black British, or Caribbean background options, adding a write-in response for the "Black African" group. In Northern Ireland, the 2021 census had "Black African" and "Black Other" tick-boxes. In Scotland, the options were "African", "Scottish African" or "British African", and "Caribbean or Black", each accompanied by a write-in response box.

In all of the UK censuses, persons with multiple familial ancestries can write in their respective ethnicities under a "Mixed or multiple ethnic groups" option, which includes additional "White and Black African" or "White and Black Caribbean" tick boxes in England, Wales, and Northern Ireland.

=== Historical usage ===
Black British or Black English was also a term for those Black and mixed-race people in Sierra Leone (known as the Creoles or the Krio(s)) who were descendants of migrants from England and Canada and identified as British. They are generally the descendants of black people who lived in England in the 18th century. In 1787, hundreds of London's black poor (a category that included the East Indian seamen known as lascars) agreed to go to this West African colony on the condition that they would retain the status of British subjects, live in freedom under the protection of the British Crown, and be defended by the Royal Navy. Making this fresh start with them were some white people (see also Committee for the Relief of the Black Poor), including lovers, wives, and widows of the black men. In addition, nearly 1200 Black Loyalists, former American slaves who had been freed and resettled in Nova Scotia, and 550 Jamaican Maroons also chose to join the new colony.

== History ==
=== Antiquity ===
According to the Augustan History, North African Roman emperor Septimius Severus visited Hadrian's Wall in 210 AD, where he was said to have been mocked by an Ethiopian soldier holding a garland of cypress-boughs. Severus ordered him away, reportedly being "frightened" by his dark skin colour and seeing his act and appearance as an omen:

On another occasion, when he was returning to his nearest quarters from an inspection of the wall at Luguvallum in Britain, at a time when he had not only proved victorious but had concluded a perpetual peace, just as he was wondering what omen would present itself, an Ethiopian soldier, who was famous among buffoons and always a notable jester, met him with a garland of cypress-boughs. And when Severus in a rage ordered that the man be removed from his sight, troubled as he was by the man's ominous colour and the ominous nature of the garland, the Ethiopian by way of jest cried, it is said, "You have been all things, you have conquered all things, now, O conqueror, be a god". And when on reaching the town he wished to perform a sacrifice, in the first place, through a misunderstanding on the part of the rustic soothsayer, he was taken to the Temple of Bellona, and, in the second place, the victims provided him were black. And then, when he abandoned the sacrifice in disgust and betook himself to the Palace, through some carelessness on the part of the attendants the black victims followed him up to its very doors.

=== Anglo-Saxon England ===
A girl buried at Updown, near Eastry in Kent in the early 7th century was found to have 33% of her DNA of West African type, most closely resembling Esan or Yoruba people.

In 2013, a skeleton was discovered in Fairford, Gloucestershire, which forensic anthropology suggested to be that of a Sub-Saharan African woman. Her remains have been dated between the years 896 and 1025. Local historians believe she was likely either a slave or a bonded servant.

=== 16th century ===
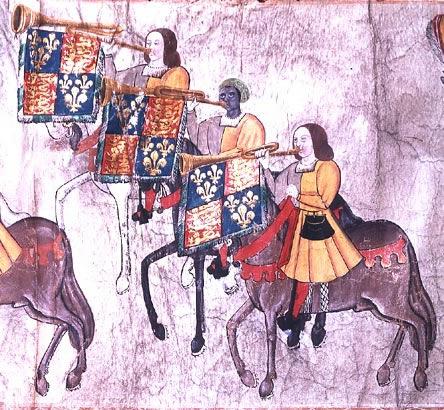
Extract from the Westminster Tournament Roll almost certainly showing John Blanke, the figure wearing a brown turban latticed with yellow

An African musician is among the six trumpeters depicted in the royal retinue of Henry VIII in the Westminster Tournament Roll, an illuminated manuscript dating from 1511. He wears the royal livery and is mounted on horseback. The man is generally identified as "John Blanke, the blacke trumpeter," who is listed in the payment accounts of both Henry VIII and his father, Henry VII. A group of Africans at the court of James IV of Scotland, included Ellen More and a drummer referred to as the "More taubronar." Both he and John Blanke were paid wages for their services. A small number of Africans worked as independent business owners in London in the late 1500s, including the silk weaver Reasonable Blackman.

When trade lines began to open between London and West Africa, people from this area began coming to Britain on board merchant and slaving ships. For example, merchant John Lok brought several captives to London in 1555 from Guinea. The voyage account in Hakluyt reports that they: "were tall and strong men, and could wel agree with our meates and drinkes. The colde and moyst aire doth somewhat offend them."

During the later 16th century as well as into the first two decades of the 17th century, 25 people named in the records of the small parish of St. Botolph's in Aldgate are identified as "blackamoors", a popular term at the time used to denote people of a Sub-Saharan African origin. In the period of the war with Spain, between 1588 and 1604, there was an increase in the number of people reaching England from Spanish colonial expeditions in parts of Africa. The English freed many of these captives from enslavement on Spanish ships. They arrived in England largely as a by-product of the slave trade; some were of mixed-race African and Spanish descent, and became interpreters or sailors. Slaver John Hawkins arrived in London with 300 captives from West Africa. However, the slave trade did not become entrenched until the 17th century and Hawkins only embarked on three expeditions.

Jacques Francis has been described as a slave by some historians, but described himself in Latin as a famulus, meaning servant, slave or attendant. Francis was a West African born on an island off the coast of Guinea, likely Arguin Island, off the coast of Mauritania. He worked as a diver for Pietro Paulo Corsi in his salvage operations on the sunken St Mary and St Edward of Southampton and other ships, such as the Mary Rose, which had sunk in Portsmouth Harbour. When Corsi was accused of theft, Francis stood by him in an English court. With help from an interpreter, he supported his master's claims of innocence. Some of the depositions in the case displayed negative attitudes towards slaves or Black people as witnesses. In March 2019 two of the skeletons found on the Mary Rose were found to have Southern European or North African ancestry; one found to be wearing a leather wrist-guard bearing the arms of Catherine of Aragon and royal arms of England is thought to possibly be Spanish or North African, the other, known as "Henry" was thought to also have similar genetic makeup. Henry's mitochondrial DNA showed that his ancestry may have came from Southern Europe, the Near East, or North Africa, although Dr Sam Robson from the University of Portsmouth "ruled out" that Henry was Black or that he was sub-Saharan African in origin. Dr Onyeka Nubia cautioned that the number of those on board the Mary Rose that had heritage beyond Britain was not necessarily representative of the whole of England at the time, although it definitely was not a "one-off". It is thought they are likely to have travelled through Spain or Portugal before arriving in Britain.

Blackamoor servants were perceived as a fashionable novelty and worked in the households of several prominent Elizabethans, including that of Queen Elizabeth I, William Pole, Francis Drake, and Anne of Denmark in Scotland. Among these servants was "John Come-quick, a blackemore", servant to Capt Thomas Love. Others included in parish registers include Domingo "a black neigro servaunt unto Sir William Winter", buried the xxviith daye of August [1587] and "Frauncis a Blackamoor servant to Thomas Parker", buried in January 1591. Some were free workers, although most were employed as domestic servants and entertainers. Some worked in ports, but were invariably described as chattel labour.

The African population may have been several hundreds during the Elizabethan period, however not all were Sub-Saharan African. Historian Michael Wood noted that Africans in England were "mostly free... [and] both men and women, married native English people." Archival evidence shows records of more than 360 African people between 1500 and 1640 in England and Scotland. Reacting to the darker complexion of people with biracial parentage, George Best argued in 1578 that black skin was not related to the heat of the sun (in Africa) but was instead caused by biblical damnation. Reginald Scot noted that superstitious people associated black skin with demons and ghosts, writing (in his sceptical book Discoverie of Witchcraft) "But in our childhood our mothers maids have so terrified us with an ouglie divell having hornes on his head, and a taile in his breech, eies like a bason, fanges like a dog, clawes like a beare, a skin like a Niger and a voice roring like a lion"; historian Ian Mortimer stated that such views "are to be noted at all levels of society". Views on Black people were "affected by preconceived notions of the Garden of Eden and the Fall from Grace." In addition, in this period, England had no concept of naturalization as a means of incorporating immigrants into the society. It conceived of English subjects as those people born on the island. Those who were not were considered by some to be incapable of becoming subjects or citizens.

In 1596, Queen Elizabeth I issued letters to the lord mayors of major cities asserting that "of late divers blackmoores brought into this realm, of which kind of people there are already here to manie...". While visiting the English court, Casper Van Senden, a German merchant from Lübeck, requested the permission to transport "Blackamoores" living in England to Portugal or Spain, presumably to sell them there. Elizabeth subsequently issued a royal warrant to Van Senden, granting him the right to do so. However, Van Senden and Sherley did not succeed in this effort, as they acknowledged in correspondence with Sir Robert Cecil. In 1601, Elizabeth issued another proclamation expressing that she was "highly discontented to understand the great number of Negroes and blackamoors which (as she is informed) are carried into this realm", and again licensing van Senden to deport them. Her proclamation of 1601 stated that the blackamoors were "fostered and powered here, to the great annoyance of [the queen's] own liege people, that covet the relief, which those people consume". It further stated that "most of them are infidels, having no understanding of Christ or his Gospel".

Studies of African people in early modern Britain indicate a minor continuing presence. Such studies include Imtiaz Habib's Black Lives in the English Archives, 1500–1677: Imprints of the Invisible (Ashgate, 2008), Onyeka's Blackamoores: Africans in Tudor England, Their Presence, Status and Origins (Narrative Eye, 2013), Miranda Kaufmann's Oxford DPhil thesis Africans in Britain, 1500–1640, and her Black Tudors: The Untold Story (Oneworld Publications, 2017).

=== 17th and 18th centuries ===
==== Slavery and the slave trade ====
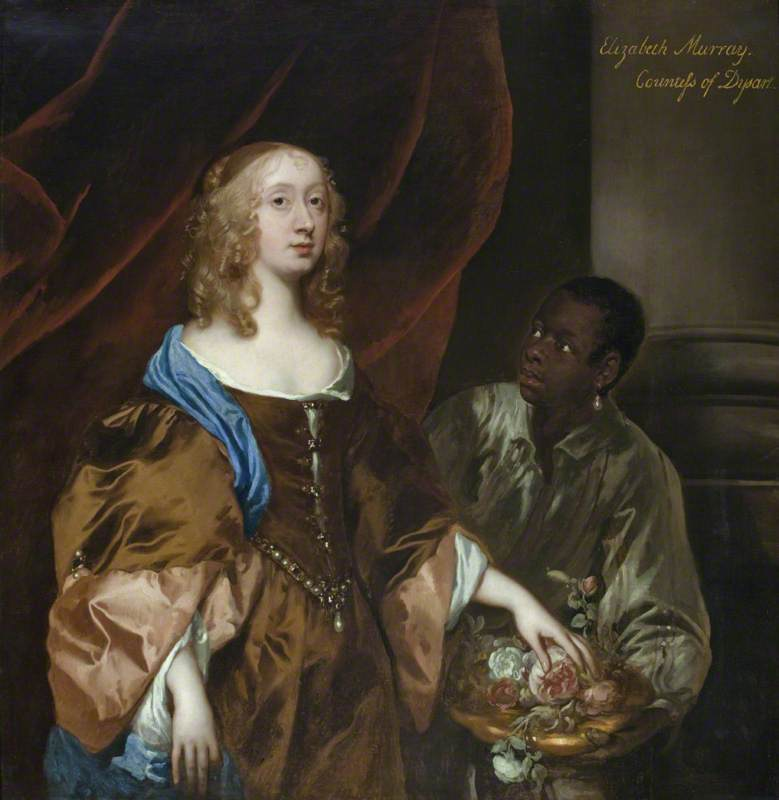
A 1651 painting of Scottish noblewoman Elizabeth Maitland, Duchess of Lauderdale with her Black servant

Britain was involved in the tri-continental slave trade between Europe, Africa and the Americas. Many of those involved in British colonial activities, such as ship's captains, colonial officials, merchants, slave traders and plantation owners brought Black slaves as servants back to Britain with them. This caused an increasing Black presence in the northern, eastern, and southern areas of London.

One of the most famous slaves to attend a sea captain was known as Sambo. He fell ill shortly after arriving in England and was consequently buried in Lancashire. His plaque and gravestone still stand to this day. There were also small numbers of free slaves and seamen from West Africa and South Asia. Many of these people were forced into beggary due to the lack of jobs and racial discrimination. In 1687, a "Moor" was given the freedom of the city of York. He is listed in the freemen's rolls as "John Moore – blacke". He is the only Black person to have been found to date in the York rolls.

===== Liverpool =====
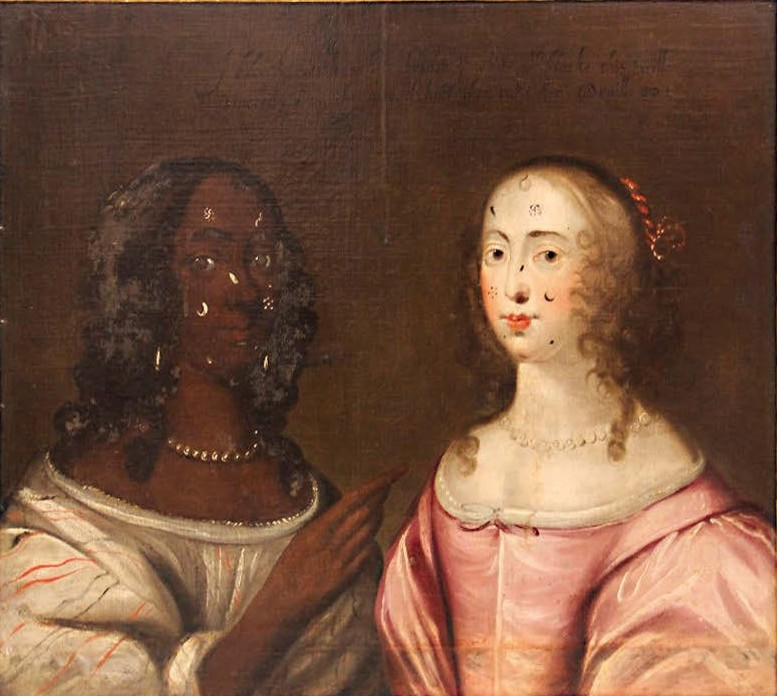
Dual portrait of a Black woman and a white woman, identities unknown, c. 1650, by an anonymous hand. The two women, who appear to be of equal standing, are wearing face patches, which were a fashion of the time. The painting is captioned: "I black with white bespott y white with blacke this evil proceeds from thy proud hart then take her: Devill."

The involvement of merchants from Great Britain in the transatlantic slave trade was the most important factor in the development of the Black British community. These communities flourished in port cities strongly involved in the slave trade, such as Liverpool and Bristol. Some Liverpudlians are able to trace their African heritage in the city back ten generations. Early Black settlers in the city included seamen, the mixed-race children of traders sent to be educated in England, servants, and freed slaves. Mistaken references to slaves entering the country after 1722 being deemed to be free men are derived from a source in which 1722 is a misprint for 1772, in turn based on a misunderstanding of the results of the Somerset case referred to below. As a result, Liverpool is home to Britain's oldest Black community, dating at least to the 1730s. By 1795, Liverpool had 62.5 per cent of the European Slave Trade.

===== Legality of slavery =====
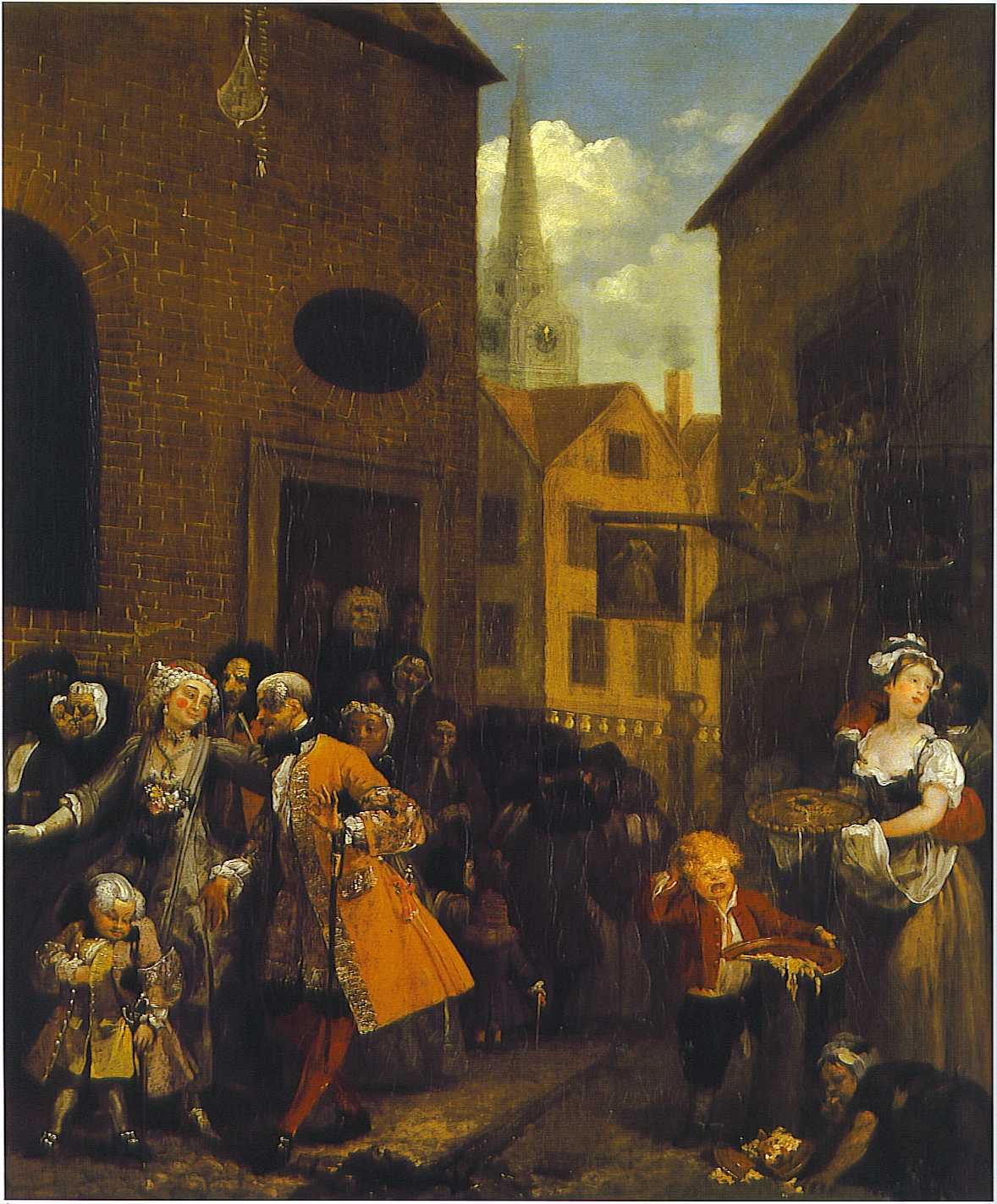
William Hogarth's painting Four Times of the Day: Noon (1738) shows a Black London resident (on the right).

During this era, Lord Mansfield declared that a slave who fled from his master could not be taken by force in England, nor sold abroad. However, Mansfield was at pains to point out that his ruling did not comment on the legality of slavery itself. This verdict fueled the numbers of Black people who escaped slavery, and helped send slavery into decline. During this same period, many former American slave soldiers, who had fought on the side of the British in the American Revolutionary War, were resettled as free men in London. They were never awarded pensions, and many of them became poverty-stricken and were reduced to begging on the streets. Reports at the time stated that they "had no prospect of subsisting in this country but by depredations on the public, or by common charity". A sympathetic observer wrote that "great numbers of Blacks and People of Colour, many of them refugees from America and others who have by land or sea been in his Majesty's service were... in great distress." Even towards white loyalists there was little good will to new arrivals from America.

Officially, slavery was not legal in England. The Cartwright decision of 1569 resolved that England was "too pure an air for a slave to breathe in". However, Black African slaves continued to be bought and sold in England during the 18th century. The slavery issue was not legally contested until the Somerset case of 1772, which concerned James Somersett, a fugitive Black enslaved person from Virginia. Lord Chief Justice William Murray, 1st Earl of Mansfield concluded that Somerset could not be forced to leave England against his will. He later reiterated: "The determinations go no further than that the master cannot by force compel him to go out of the kingdom." Despite the previous rulings, such as the 1706 declaration (which was clarified a year later) by Lord Chief Justice Holt on slavery not being legal in Britain, it was often ignored, with slaveowners arguing that the slaves were property and therefore could not be considered people. Slave owner Thomas Papillon was one of many who took his Black servant "to be in the nature and quality of my goods and chattel".

==== Rise in population ====
Black people lived among whites in London in areas of Mile End, Stepney, Paddington, and St Giles. After Mansfield's ruling many former slaves continued to work for their old masters as paid employees. Between 14,000 and 15,000 (then contemporary estimates) slaves were immediately freed in England. Many of these emancipated individuals became labelled as the "black poor", the black poor were defined as former slave soldiers since emancipated, seafarers, such as South Asian lascars, former indentured servants and former indentured plantation workers. Around the 1750s, London became the home to many Black people, as well as Jews, Irish, Germans and Huguenots. According to Gretchen Gerzina in her Black London, by the mid-18th century, Black people accounted for somewhere between 1% and 3% of the London populace. Evidence of the number of Black residents in the city has been found through registered burials. Some Black people in London resisted slavery through escape. Leading Black activists of this era included British-Nigerian Olaudah Equiano, British-Ghanaian Ottobah Cugoano and Ignatius Sancho. Mixed-race Dido Elizabeth Belle who was born a slave in the Caribbean moved to Britain with her white father in the 1760s. In 1764, The Gentleman's Magazine reported that there was "supposed to be near 20,000 Negroe servants".

John Ystumllyn (c. 1738 – 1786) was the first well-recorded Black person of North Wales. He may have been a victim of the Atlantic slave trade, and was from either West Africa or the Caribbean. He was taken by the Wynn family to their Ystumllyn estate in Criccieth, and christened with the Welsh name John Ystumllyn. He was taught English and Welsh by the locals, became a gardener at the estate and "grew into a handsome and vigorous young man". His portrait was painted in 1750s. He married local Welsh woman Margaret Gruffydd in 1768 and their descendants still live in the area.

It was reported in the Morning Gazette that there was 30,000 in the country as a whole, though the numbers were thought to be "alarmist" exaggerations. In the same year, a party for Black men and women in a Fleet Street pub was sufficiently unusual to be written about in the newspapers. Their presence in the country was striking enough to start heated outbreaks of distaste for colonies of Hottentots. Modern historians estimate, based on parish lists, baptismal and marriage registers as well as criminal and sales contracts, that about 10,000 Black people lived in Britain during the 18th century. Other estimates put the number at 15,000.

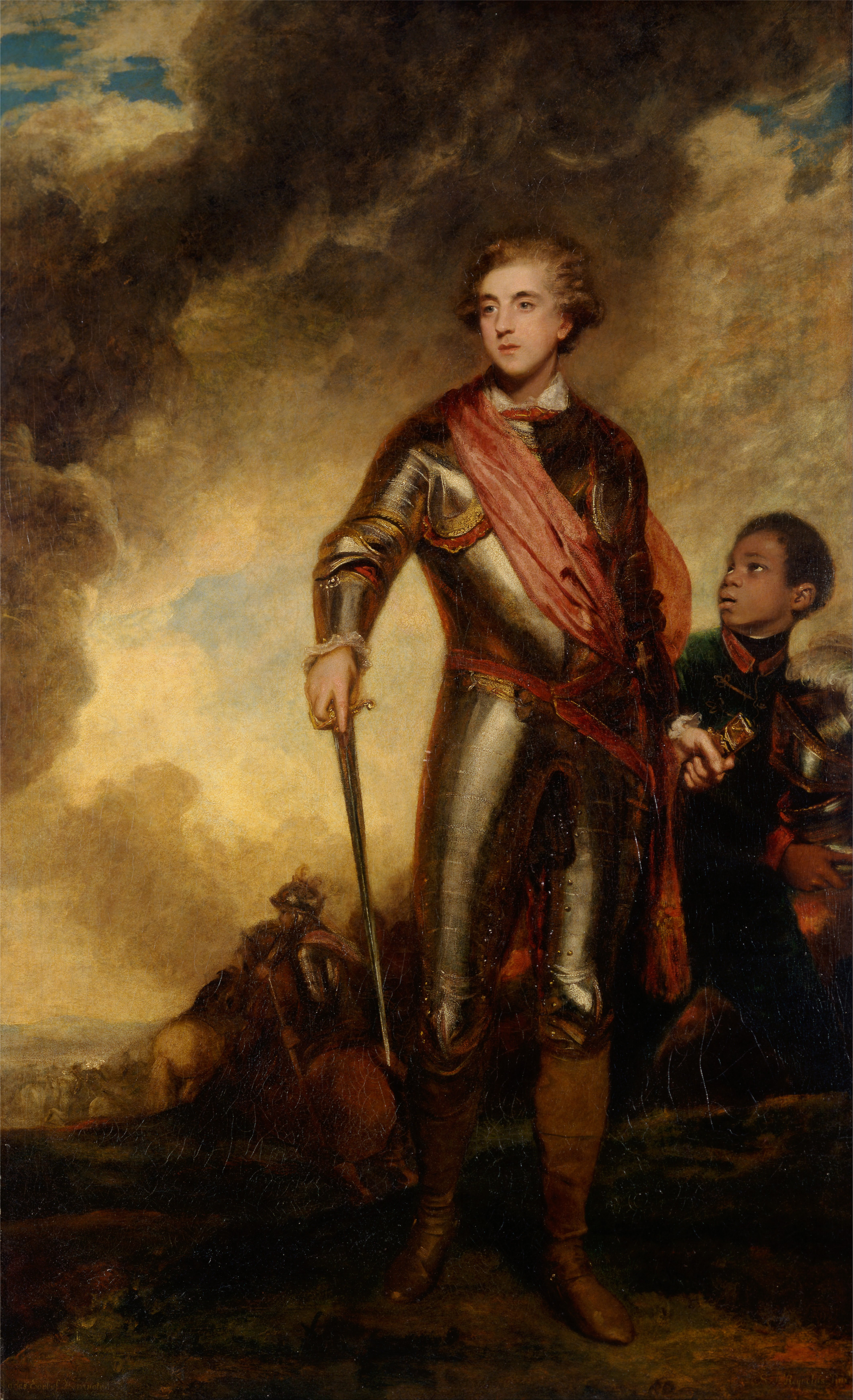
Charles Stanhope, 3rd Earl of Harrington and Marcus Richard Fitzroy Thomas by Joshua Reynolds

In 1772, Lord Mansfield put the number of Black people in the country at as many as 15,000, though most modern historians consider 10,000 to be the most likely. The black population was estimated at around 10,000 in London, making black people approximately 1% of the overall London population. The black population constituted around 0.1% of the total population of Britain in 1780. The Black female population is estimated to have barely reached 20% of the overall Afro-Caribbean population in the country. In the 1780s with the end of the American Revolutionary War, hundreds of Black loyalists from America were resettled in Britain. Marcus Thomas is thought to have been brought at that time from Jamaica as a young boy by the Stanhope family, working as a servant in their home, being baptised aged 19, and later joining the Westminster Militia as a drummer. Later, some immigrated to Sierra Leone, with help from Committee for the Relief of the Black Poor after suffering destitution, to form the Sierra Leone Creole ethnic identity.

==== Discrimination ====
In 1731, the Lord Mayor of London ruled that "no Negroes shall be bound apprentices to any Tradesman or Artificer of this City". Due to this ruling, most were forced into working as domestic servants and other menial professions. Those Black Londoners who were unpaid servants were in effect slaves in anything but name. In 1787, Thomas Clarkson, an English abolitionist, noted at a speech in Manchester: "I was surprised also to find a great crowd of black people standing round the pulpit. There might be forty or fifty of them." There is evidence that Black men and women were occasionally discriminated against when dealing with the law because of their skin colour. In 1737, George Scipio was accused of stealing Anne Godfrey's washing, the case rested entirely on whether or not Scipio was the only Black man in Hackney at the time. Ignatius Sancho, Black writer, composer, shopkeeper and voter in Westminster wrote, that despite being in Britain since the age of two he felt he was "only a lodger, and hardly that." Sancho complained of "the national antipathy and prejudice" of native white Britons "towards their wooly headed brethren." Sancho was frustrated that many resorted to stereotyping their Black neighbours. A financially independent householder, he was the second Black person of African origin to vote in parliamentary elections in Britain, in a time when only 3% of the British population were allowed to vote.

Sailors of African descent experienced far less prejudice compared to Black people in the cities such as London. Black sailors would have shared the same quarters, duties and pay as their white shipmates. There are some disputes in the estimation of Black sailors, conservative estimates put it between 6% and 8% of navy sailors of the time, this proportion is considerably larger than the population as a whole. Notable examples are Olaudah Equiano and Francis Barber.

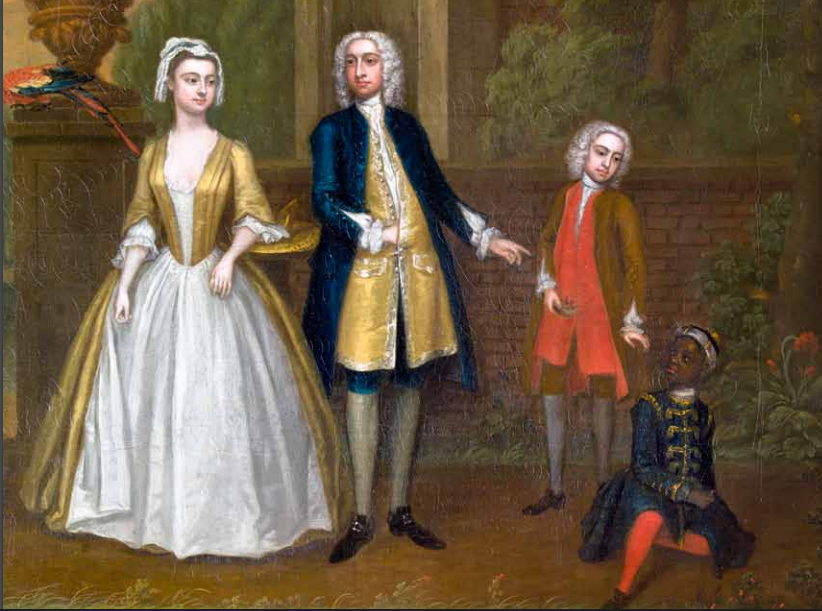
An 18th-century painting of the Irish politician Edward Southwell Jr. and his family pictured with their Black child servant

==== Abolitionism ====
With the support of other Britons, these activists demanded that Blacks be freed from slavery. Supporters involved in these movements included workers and other nationalities of the urban poor. Black people in London who were supporters of the abolitionist movement include Cugoano and Equiano. At this time, slavery in Britain itself had no support from common law, but its definitive legal status was not clearly defined until the 19th century.

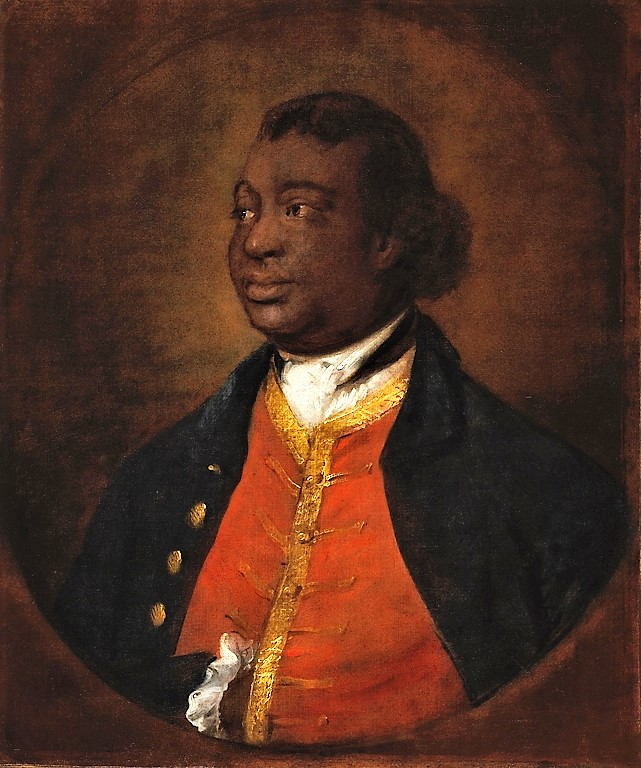
Composer and shopkeeper Ignatius Sancho was the first black person of African origins to vote in parliamentary elections and became a symbol of the humanity of Africans and immorality of the slave trade.

==== Olaudah Equiano ====
During the late 18th century, numerous publications and memoirs were written about the "black poor". One example is the writings of British-Nigerian Olaudah Equiano, a former enslaved man who wrote a memoir titled The Interesting Narrative of the Life of Olaudah Equiano.

In 1786, Equiano became the first African person to be employed by the British government, when he was made Commissary of Provisions and Stores for the 350 Black people suffering from poverty who had decided to accept the government's offer of an assisted passage to Sierra Leone. The following year, in 1787, encouraged by the Committee for the Relief of the Black Poor, about 400 melanated Londoners were aided in emigrating to Sierra Leone in West Africa, founding the first British colony on the continent. They asked that their status as British subjects be recognized, along with requests that they be given military protection by the Royal Navy. However, even though the committee signed up about 700 members of the Black Poor, only 441 boarded the three ships that set sail from London to Portsmouth. Many black Londoners were no longer interested in the scheme, and the coercion employed by the committee and the government to recruit them only reinforced their opposition. Equiano, who was originally involved in the scheme, became one of its most vocal critics. Another prominent Black Londoner, British-Ghanaian Ottobah Cugoano, also criticised the scheme.

==== Ancestry ====
In 2007, scientists found the rare paternal haplogroup A1 in a few living British men with Yorkshire surnames. This clade is today almost exclusively found among males in West Africa, where it is also rare. The haplogroup is thought to have been brought to Britain either through enlisted soldiers during Roman Britain, or later via the modern slave trade. Turi King, a co-author on the study, noted the most probable "guess" was the West African slave trade. Some of the known individuals who arrived through the slave route, such as Ignatius Sancho and Olaudah Equiano, attained a very high social rank. Some married into the general English population.

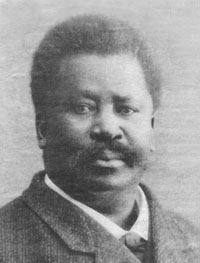
Pablo Fanque, celebrated circus owner and performer in Victorian Britain

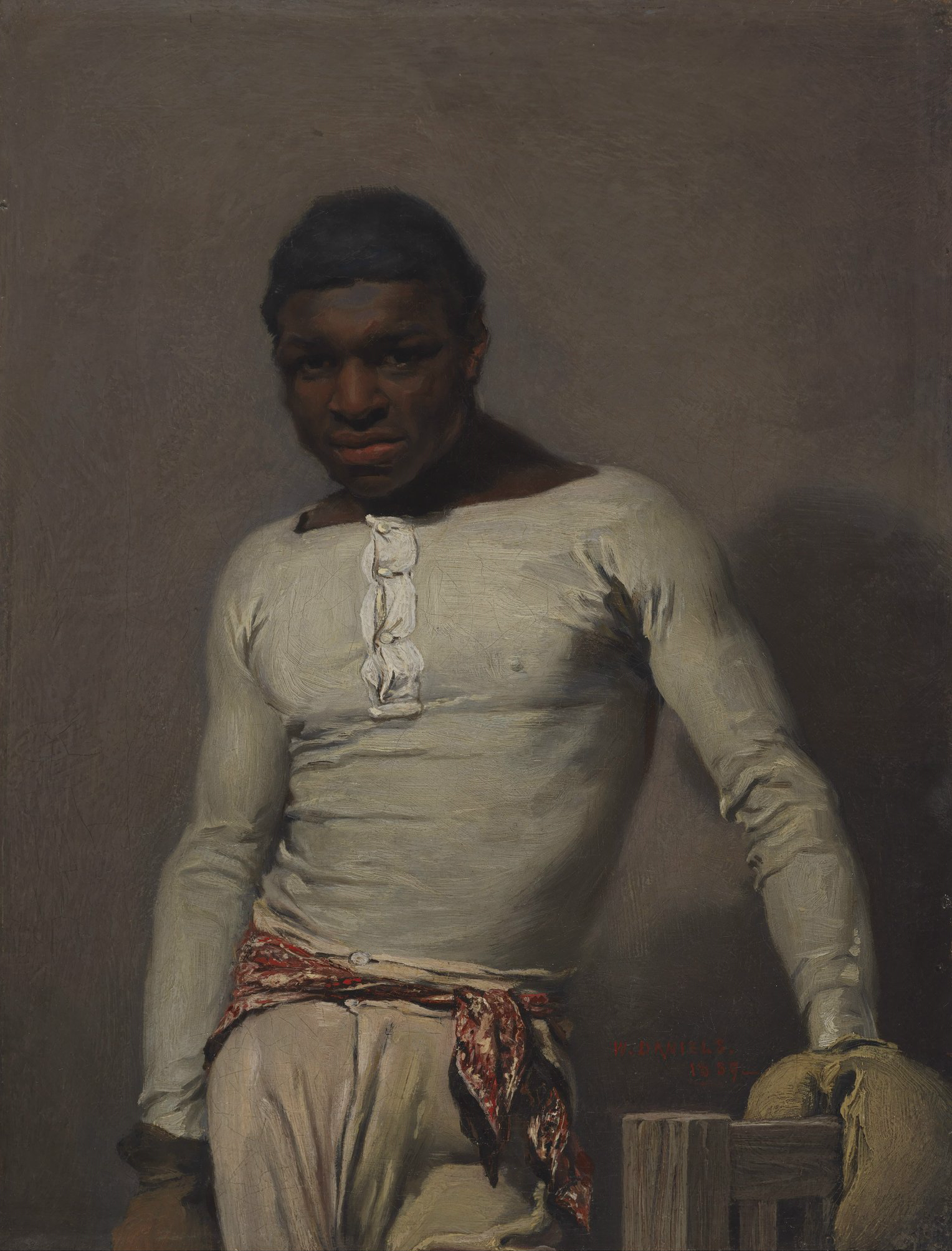
Portrait of the London-born boxer James Wharton, 1839

=== 19th century ===
In the late 18th century, the British slave trade declined in response to changing popular opinion. Both Great Britain and the United States abolished the Atlantic slave trade in 1808, and cooperated in liberating slaves from illegal trading ships off the coast of West Africa. Many of these freed slaves were taken to Sierra Leone for settlement. Slavery was abolished completely in the British Empire by 1834, although it had been profitable on Caribbean plantations. Fewer Black people were brought into London from the West Africa and West Indies. The resident British Black population, primarily male, was no longer growing from the trickle of enslaved people and servants from the West Indies and America.

Abolition meant a virtual halt to the arrival of Black people to Britain, just as immigration from Europe was increasing. The Black population of Victorian Britain was so small that those living outside of larger trading ports were isolated from the Black population. The mentioning of Black people and descendants in parish registers declined markedly in the early 19th century. It is possible that researchers simply did not collect the data or that the mostly Black male population of the late 18th century had married white women. Evidence of such marriages may still be found today with descendants of Black servants such as Francis Barber, a Jamaican-born slave who lived in Britain during the 18th century. His descendants still live in England today and are white. Abolition of slavery in 1833, effectively ended the period of small-scale Black immigration to London and Britain. Though, there were some exceptions, Black and Chinese seamen began putting down the roots of small communities in British ports, not least because they were abandoned there by their employers.

From the early part of the century through the mid-late century, students of African descent were admitted to British Universities. Many students came from West African colonies including Sierra Leone, the Gold Coast, the Gambia and Nigeria. Such students, for example, were James Africanus Beale Horton, William Broughton Davies, Christian Frederick Cole as well as others. Another was the African American James McCune Smith, who travelled from New York City to Glasgow University to study medicine. In 1837 he was awarded a medical doctorate and published two scientific articles in the London Medical Gazette. These articles are the first known to be published by an African-American medical doctor in a scientific journal.

In the 1880s, there was a build-up of small groups of Black dockside communities in towns such as Canning Town, Liverpool and Cardiff. West African seamen had settled in Liverpool from at least the nineteenth century and became an important part of the city's Black community.

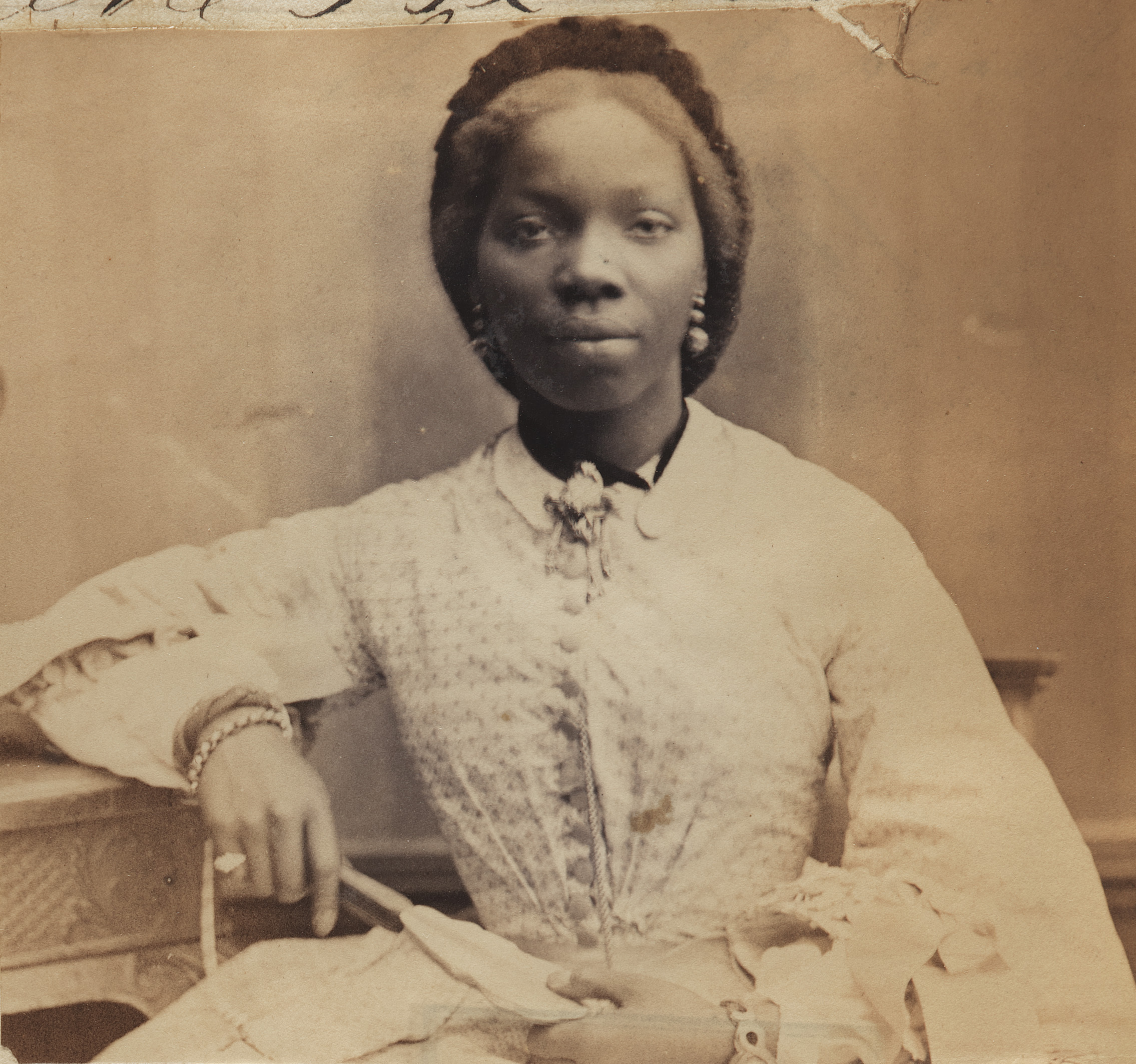
Sarah Forbes Bonetta, Yoruba princess and goddaughter to Queen Victoria. Orphaned in warfare, given as a "gift" to Queen Victoria.

Despite social prejudice and discrimination in Victorian England, some 19th-century Black Britons achieved exceptional success. Pablo Fanque, born likely to West African parents as William Darby in Norwich, rose to become the proprietor of one of Britain's most successful Victorian circuses. He is immortalised in the lyrics of The Beatles song "Being for the Benefit of Mr. Kite!" Thirty years after his 1871 death, the chaplain of the Showman's Guild said:

"In the great brotherhood of the equestrian world there is no colour line [bar], for, although Pablo Fanque was of African extraction, he speedily made his way to the top of his profession. The camaraderie of the ring has but one test – ability."

Another great circus performer was equestrian Joseph Hillier, who took over and ran Andrew Ducrow's circus company after Ducrow died.

Annie Brewster, 'Nurse Ophthalmic' at London Hospital

Annie Brewster joined the staff of the London Hospital as a nurse in 1881 and rose to become known as 'Nurse Ophthalmic', in charge of the ophthalmic wards.

By the late 19th century, race discrimination was furthered by theories of scientific racism, which held that white people were the 'superior race' and that Black people were less intelligent than white people. Attempts to support these theories cited "scientific evidence", such as brain size. James Hunt, President of the London Anthropological Society, in 1863 in his paper "On the Negro's place in nature" wrote that "the Negro is inferior intellectually to the European...[and] can only be humanised and civilised by Europeans."

An Indian Briton, Dadabhai Naoroji, stood for election to parliament for the Liberal Party in 1886. He was defeated, leading the leader of the Conservative Party, Lord Salisbury to remark that "however great the progress of mankind has been, and however far we have advanced in overcoming prejudices, I doubt if we have yet got to the point of view where a British constituency would elect a Black man". Naoroji was elected to parliament in 1892, becoming the second Member of Parliament (MP) of Indian descent after David Ochterlony Dyce Sombre.

=== 20th century ===
==== Early 20th century ====
On Christmas Day 1901 Aston Villa beat Everton 3-2 at Goodison. Villa's Willie Clarke became the first Black player to score in the English First Division. According to the Sierra Leonan barrister and writer, Augustus Merriman-Labor, in his 1909 book Britons Through Negro Spectacles, London's Black population at the time did "not much exceed one hundred" people and "to every one Negro there, there are over sixty thousand whites".

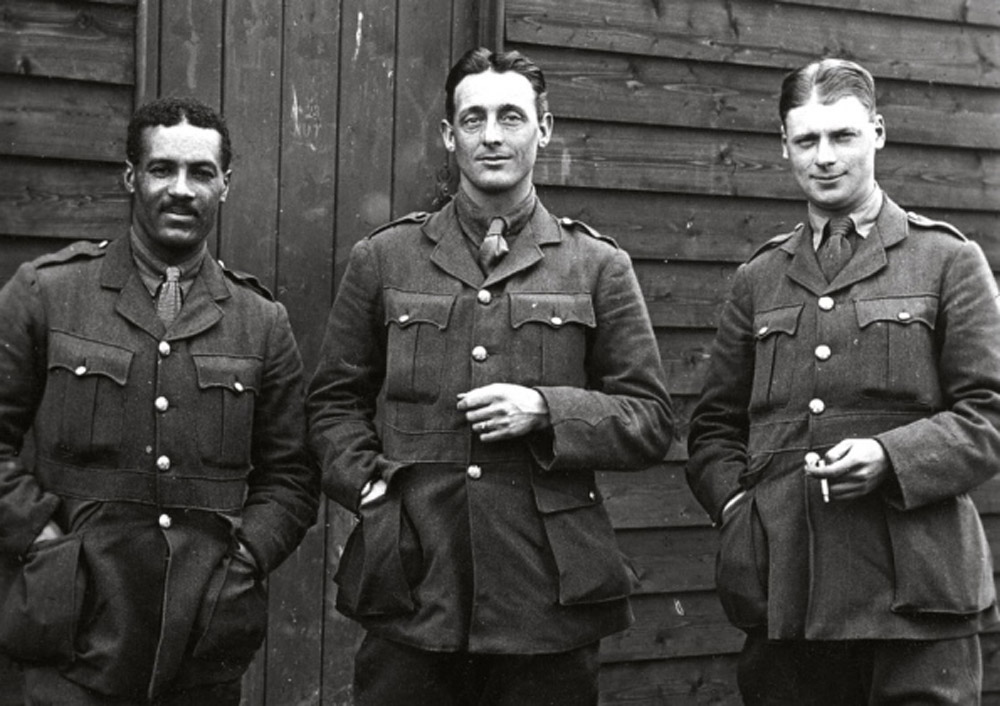
Walter Tull, professional footballer and mixed-heritage British Army officer, pictured with fellow officers

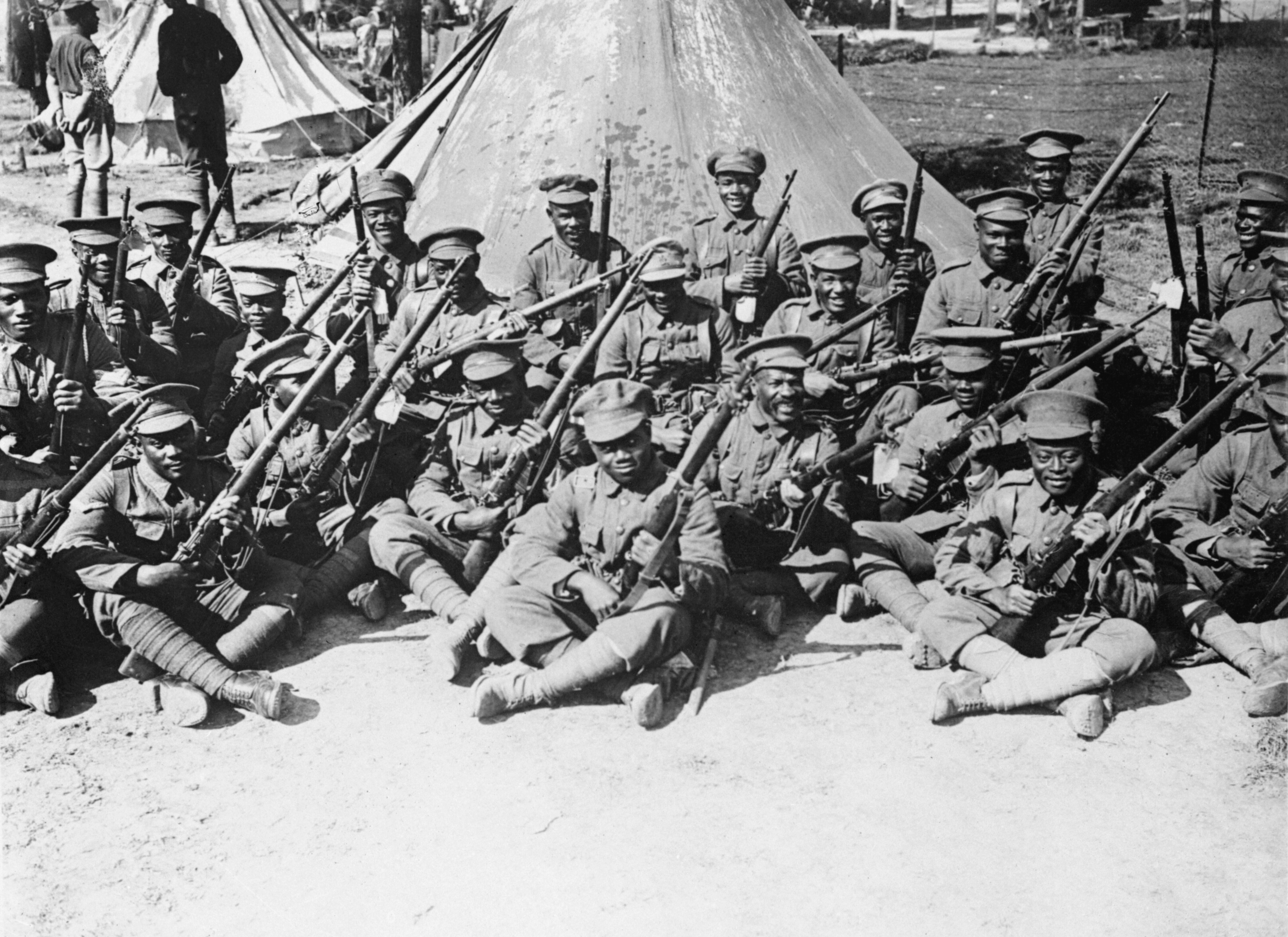
Members of the British West Indies Regiment on the Somme, September 1916. All of the men pictured were Afro-Caribbean people who volunteered to fight for the British Army.

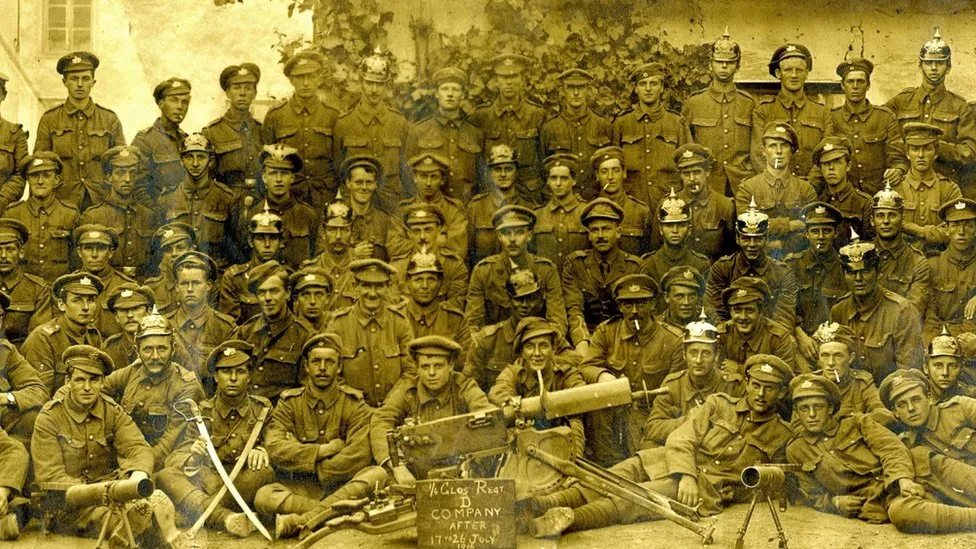
Soldiers of D Company, 1/4th Battalion, The Gloucestershire Regiment, with a captured German Maxim machine gun. A board in the foreground is dated "After 17–22 July 1916". A "pals" company, all the men were from the Bristol area. Sitting in front of central the capped officer is a Black man, wearing a spiked German helmet.

World War I saw a small growth in the size of London's Black communities with the arrival of merchant seamen and soldiers. At that time, there were also small groups of students from Africa and the Caribbean migrating into London. These communities are now among the oldest Black communities of London. The largest Black communities were to be found in the United Kingdom's great port cities: London's East End, Liverpool, Bristol and Cardiff's Tiger Bay, with other communities in South Shields in Tyne & Wear and Glasgow. In 1914, the Black population was estimated at 10,000 and centred largely in London.

By 1918 there may have been as many as 20,000 or 30,000 black people living in Britain. However, the Black population was much smaller relative to the total British population of 45 million and official documents were not adapted to record ethnicity. Black residents had for the most part emigrated from parts of the British Empire. The number of black soldiers serving in the British army, (rather than colonial regiments,) prior to World War I is unknown but was likely to have been negligibly low. One of the Black British soldiers during World War I was Walter Tull, an English professional footballer, born to a Barbadian carpenter Daniel Tull and Kent-born Alice Elizabeth Palmer. His grandfather was a slave in Barbados. Tull became the first British-born mixed-heritage infantry officer in a regular British Army regiment, despite the 1914 Manual of Military Law specifically excluding soldiers that were not "of pure European descent" from becoming commissioned officers.

Colonial soldiers of Afro-Caribbean descent and thousands of seamen from West Africa and the Caribbean served in the United Kingdom during the First World War, and some settled in British cities. Black communities in several British port cities were affected by the race riots of 1919. Charles Wootton (also recorded as Wooten or Wotten), a Black seaman and First World War veteran, was killed by a white mob in Liverpool during the unrest. Other cities with significant Black communities (including Cardiff, Glasgow and London) were also hit by riots. Due to these disturbances, some of the residents from the Black diaspora as well as many other immigrants were evacuated to their homelands. In that first postwar summer, other racial riots of whites against "coloured" peoples also took place in numerous United States cities, towns in the Caribbean, and South Africa. They were part of the social dislocation after the war as societies struggled to integrate veterans into the work forces again, and groups competed for jobs and housing.

The West African Students' Union (WASU), founded in London in 1925 by Ladipo Solanke and Herbert Bankole-Bright, became an important organisation supporting African students in Britain and campaigning against racial discrimination and colonial rule. It played a significant role in linking Black political activism in Britain with anti-colonial movements in West Africa and provided a base for political discussion and organisation among African students.

==== World War II ====
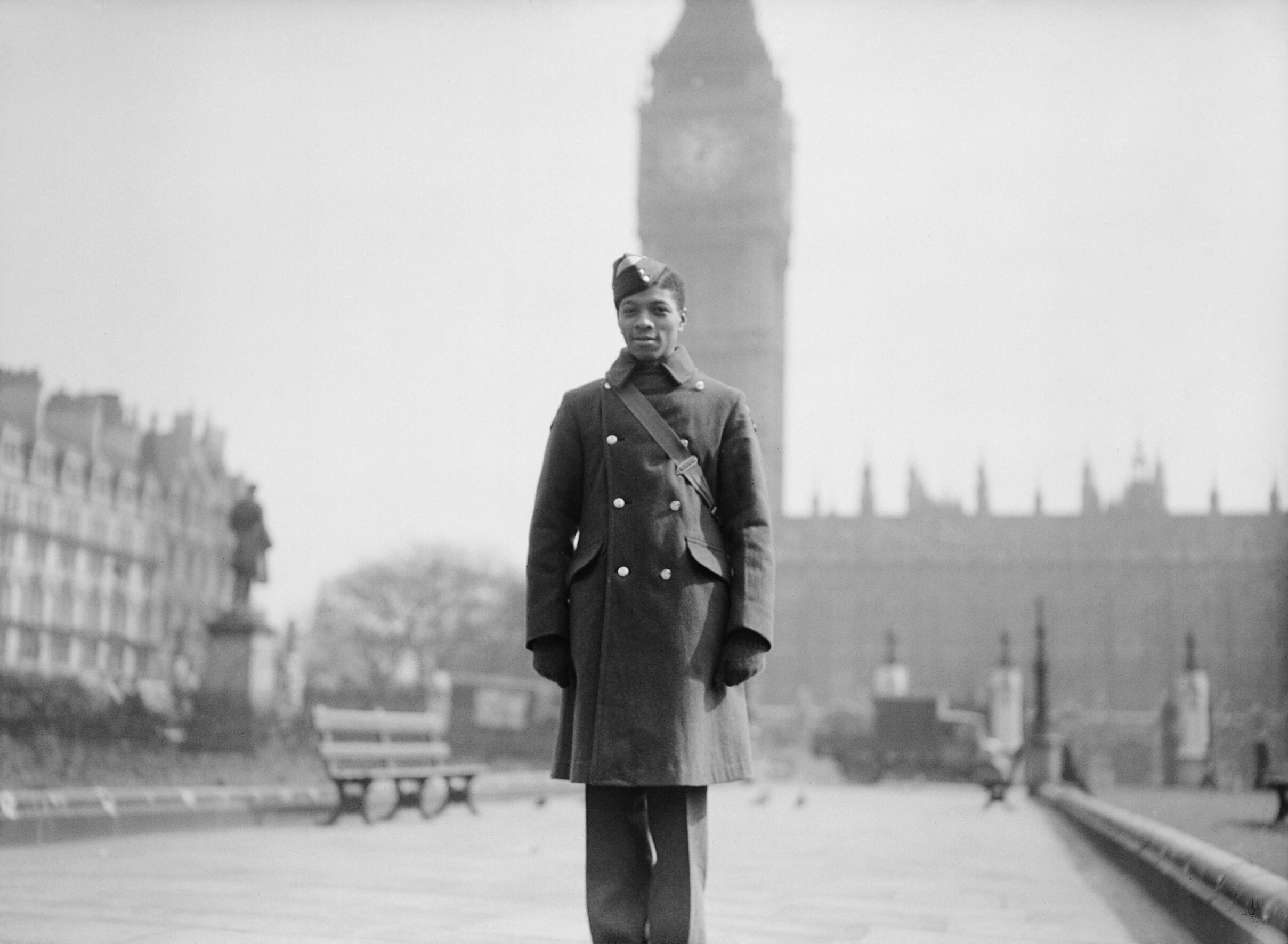
RAF student pilot Jellicoe Scoon from Trinidad, standing at Parliament Square in London, 26 March 1942

World War II marked another period of growth for the Black communities in London, Liverpool and elsewhere in Britain. Many Blacks from the Caribbean and West Africa arrived in small groups as wartime workers, merchant seamen, and servicemen from the army, navy, and air forces. For example, in February 1941, 345 West Indians came to work in factories in and around Liverpool, making munitions. Among those from the Caribbean who joined the Royal Air Force (RAF) and gave distinguished service are Ulric Cross from Trinidad, Cy Grant from Guyana and Billy Strachan from Jamaica. The African and Caribbean War Memorial was installed in Brixton, London, in 2017 by the Nubian Jak Community Trust to honour servicemen from Africa and the Caribbean who served alongside British and Commonwealth Forces in both the First World War and Second World War.

By the end of 1943, there were 3,312 African-American GIs based at Maghull and Huyton, near Liverpool. The Black population in the summer of 1944 was estimated at 150,000, mostly Black GIs from the United States. However, by 1948 the Black population was estimated to have been less than 20,000 and did not reach the previous peak of 1944 until 1958.

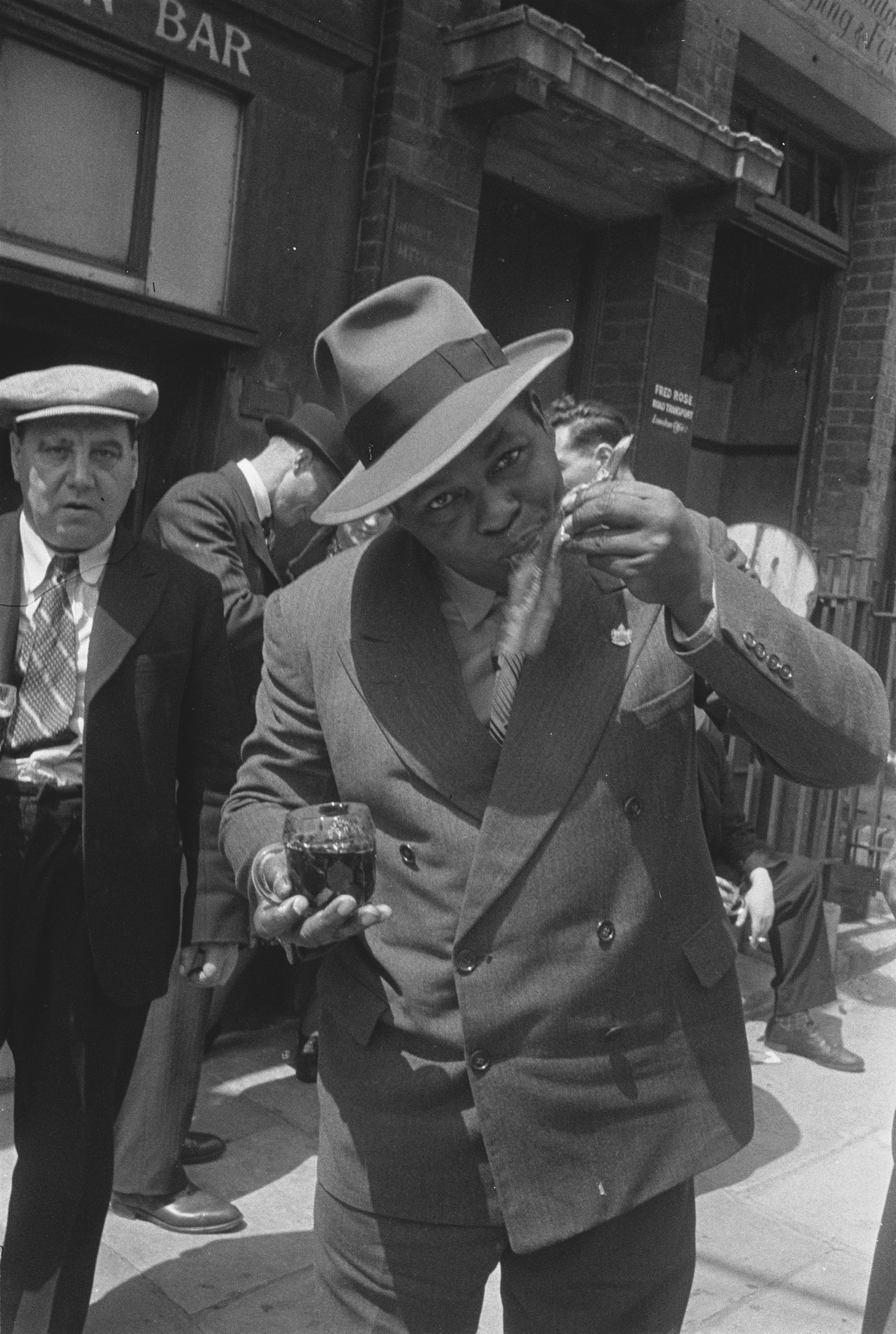
A Afro-Dutch merchant seaman eating maatjesharing in London, June 1943

Learie Constantine, a West Indian cricketer, was a welfare officer with the Ministry of Labour when he was refused service at a London hotel. He sued for breach of contract and was awarded damages. This particular example is used by some to illustrate the slow change from racism towards acceptance and equality of all citizens in London. In 1943, Amelia King was refused work by the Essex branch of the Women's Land Army because she was Black. The decision was overturned after her cause was taken up by Holborn Trades Council, which led to her MP, Walter Edwards, raising the matter in the House of Commons. She ultimately took a placement in Frith Farm, Wickham, Hampshire and had lodgings with a family in the village.

==== Post-war ====
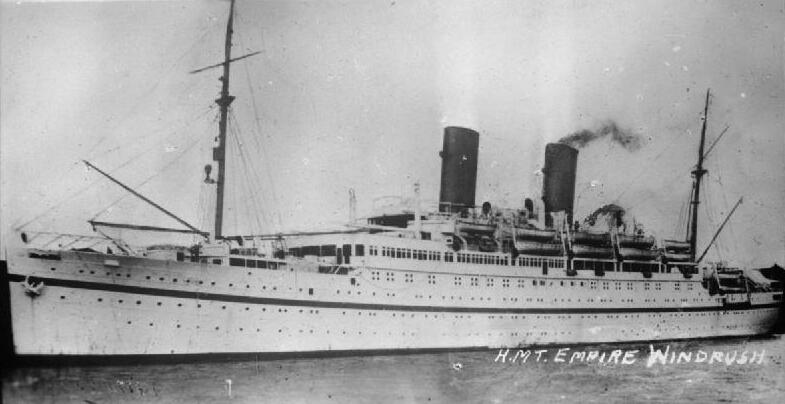
The Empire Windrush is extremely important within Black British history; in 1948 it carried a major group of Caribbean migrants to the United Kingdom.

In 1950, there were probably fewer than 20,000 non-White residents in Britain, almost all born overseas. Following the Second World War, migration to Britain increased from the Caribbean and from parts of West Africa, driven by labour shortages and facilitated by imperial and Commonwealth connections. While Caribbean migration—symbolised by the arrival of HMT Empire Windrush in 1948—formed the most visible early wave, migration from West Africa also expanded through students, professionals, workers and later family settlement, particularly during and after the decolonisation of the 1950s and 1960s.

In the post-war period, particularly during the 1950s to 1970s, tens of thousands of West African children in Britain were privately fostered with other families, a practice sometimes referred to as "farming", often reflecting the circumstances of migrant parents balancing work and study commitments, and in some cases continuing into later decades. Private fostering was particularly established within Kent and Essex, as well as Hertfordshire, East Sussex and Surrey, with numerous children placed outside Greater London where many of their parents studied, lived and/or worked. Estimates suggest that more than 70,000 African children were privately fostered in Britain between 1955 and 1995, although the true number is difficult to establish because such private arrangements were not centrally monitored.

After World War II, the largest influx of Black people occurred, mostly from the British West Indies. More than a quarter of a million West Indians, the overwhelming majority of them from Jamaica, settled in Britain in less than a decade. In 1951, the population of African and Caribbean born people in Britain was estimated at 20,900. In the mid-1960s, Britain had become the centre of the largest overseas population of West Indians. This migration event is often labelled "Windrush", a reference to the HMT Empire Windrush, the ship that carried the first major group of Caribbean migrants to the United Kingdom in 1948.

"Caribbean" is itself not one ethnic or political identity; for example, some of this wave of immigrants were Indo-Caribbean. The most widely used term used at that time was West Indian (or sometimes coloured). Black British did not come into widespread use until the second generation were born to these post-war migrants to the UK. Although British by nationality, due to friction between them and the White majority they were often born into communities that were relatively closed, creating the roots of what would become a distinct Black British identity. By the 1950s, there was a consciousness of Black people as a separate group that had not been there during 1932–1938. The increasing consciousness of Black British peoples was deeply informed by the influx of Black American culture imported by Black servicemen during and after World War II, music being a central example of what Jacqueline Nassy-Brown calls "diasporic resources". These close interactions between Americans and Black British were not only material but also inspired the expatriation of some Black British women to America after marrying servicemen (some of whom later repatriated to the UK).

==== Late 20th century ====
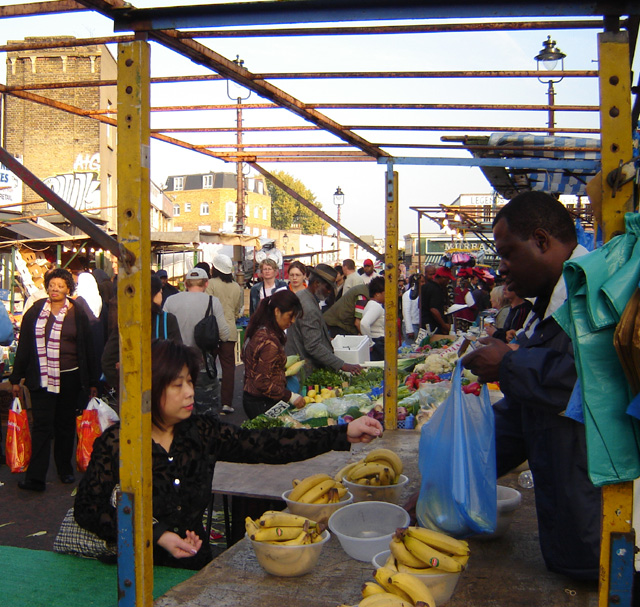
Ridley Road Market in Dalston, London, which sells Afro-Caribbean music, textiles, and food including goat meat, yams, mangos and spices

In 1961, the population of people born in Africa or the Caribbean was estimated at 191,600, just under 0.4% of the total UK population. The birthplace figures of course do not directly capture the Black British population, as they do not directly identify ethnic group and exclude British-born descendants of migrants. The 1962 Commonwealth Immigrants Act was passed in Britain along with a succession of other laws in 1968, 1971 and 1981, which severely restricted the entry of Black immigrants into Britain. During this period it is widely argued that emergent Black people struggled in Britain against racism and prejudice. During the 1970s—and partly in response to both the rise in racial intolerance and the rise of the Black Power movement abroad—black became detached from its negative connotations, and was reclaimed as a marker of pride: Black is beautiful. The Race Relations Act 1965 was the first legislation in the United Kingdom to address racial discrimination, prohibiting discrimination in public places and making incitement to racial hatred an offence. Although limited in scope, it marked a significant step in the legal recognition of racial equality, later expanded by the Race Relations Acts of 1968 and 1976. Activists such as Paul Stephenson, who led the 1963 Bristol Bus Boycott, played a key role in challenging racial discrimination in Britain and contributing to wider pressure for change. In 1975, David Pitt was appointed to the House of Lords. He spoke against racism and for equality in regards to all residents of Britain. In the years that followed, several Black members were elected into the British Parliament. By 1981, the Black population in the United Kingdom was estimated at 1.4% of all countries of birth, being 0.8% Black-Caribbean, 0.3% Black-African, and 0.3% Black-Other residents. Again, the figures do not directly encapsulate the Black British population overall, as earlier population estimates generally relied on measures such as country of birth, nationality, migration status or household/family head information rather than a self-defined ethnic classification.

Since the 1980s, most Black immigrants to the United Kingdom have come directly from Africa. Migration continued from Nigeria and Ghana in West Africa, as well as from Uganda and Kenya in East Africa and from Zimbabwe, and South Africa in Southern Africa. Pupils of Nigerians and Ghanaians heritage have achieved strong results at GCSE and A-Level, often matching or exceeding of white pupils.

By the 1991 census, the Black population of Great Britain was recorded at 890,727 (1.6% of the total population). This included 499,964 people in the Black Caribbean category (0.9%), 212,362 in the Black African category (0.4%) and 178,401 in the Black Other category (0.3%). The census also experienced significant under-enumeration. Black Africans had particularly low tracing rates, with 23.42% of Black-African men and 19.12% of Black-African women not traced.

London contained the largest concentration, with around half a million Black residents, and an increasing proportion were British-born. Even with this growing population and the first Black MP's elected to Parliament, many argue that there was still discrimination towards, and a socio-economic imbalance in London, among Black people. In 1992, the number of Black MPs in Parliament increased to six, and in 1997, they increased their numbers to nine. There are still many problems that Black Londoners face; the new global and high-tech information revolution is changing the urban economy and some argue that it is driving up unemployment rates among the Black population relative to the non-black population, something, it is argued, that threatens to erode the progress made thus far. By 2001, the Black British population was recorded at 1,148,738 (2.0%) in the 2001 census. This included 565,876 people in the Black Caribbean category (1.0%), 485,277 in the Black African category (0.8%) and 97,585 in the Black Other category (0.2%). Mixed or Multiple ethnic groups were also recorded, including those identifying as White and Black Caribbean and White and Black African.

==== Street conflicts and policing ====
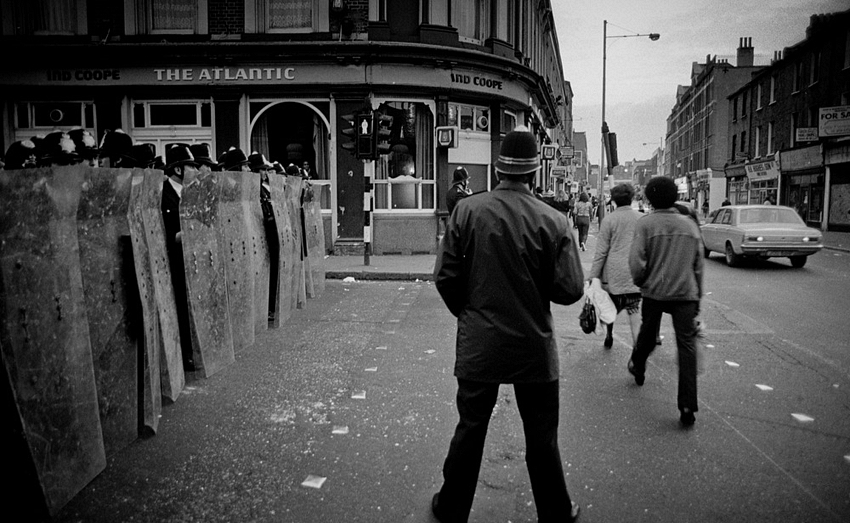
The Brixton race riot in London, 1981

The late 1950s through to the late 1980s saw a number of mass street conflicts involving young Afro-Caribbean men and British police officers in English cities, mostly as a result of tensions between members of local Black communities and whites.

The first major incident occurred in 1958 in Notting Hill, when roaming gangs of between 300 and 400 white youths attacked Afro-Caribbeans and their houses across the neighbourhood, leading to a number of Afro-Caribbean men being left unconscious in the streets. The following year, Antigua-born Kelso Cochrane was murdered by being set upon and stabbed by a gang of white youths while walking home to Notting Hill.

During the 1970s, police forces across England increasingly began to use the Sus law, provoking a sense that young Black men were being discriminated against by the police The next newsworthy outbreak of street fighting occurred in 1976 at the Notting Hill Carnival when several hundred police officers and youths became involved in televised fights and scuffles, with stones thrown at police, baton charges and a number of minor injuries and arrests.

The 1980 St Pauls riot in Bristol saw fighting between local youths and police officers, resulting in numerous minor injuries, damage to property and arrests. In London, 1981 brought further conflict, with a perceived racist police force after the death of 13 Black youngsters who were attending a birthday party that ended in the devastating New Cross Fire. The fire was viewed by many as a racist massacre and a major political demonstration, known as the Black People's Day of Action was held to protest against the attacks themselves, a perceived rise in racism, and perceived hostility and indifference from the police, politicians and media. Tensions were further inflamed when, in nearby Brixton, police launched Operation Swamp 81, a series of mass stop-and-searches of young Black men. Anger erupted when up to 500 people were involved in street fighting between the Metropolitan Police and the local Afro-Caribbean community, leading to a number of cars and shops being set on fire, stones thrown at police and hundreds of arrests and minor injuries. A similar pattern occurred further north in England that year, in Toxteth, Liverpool, and Chapeltown, Leeds.

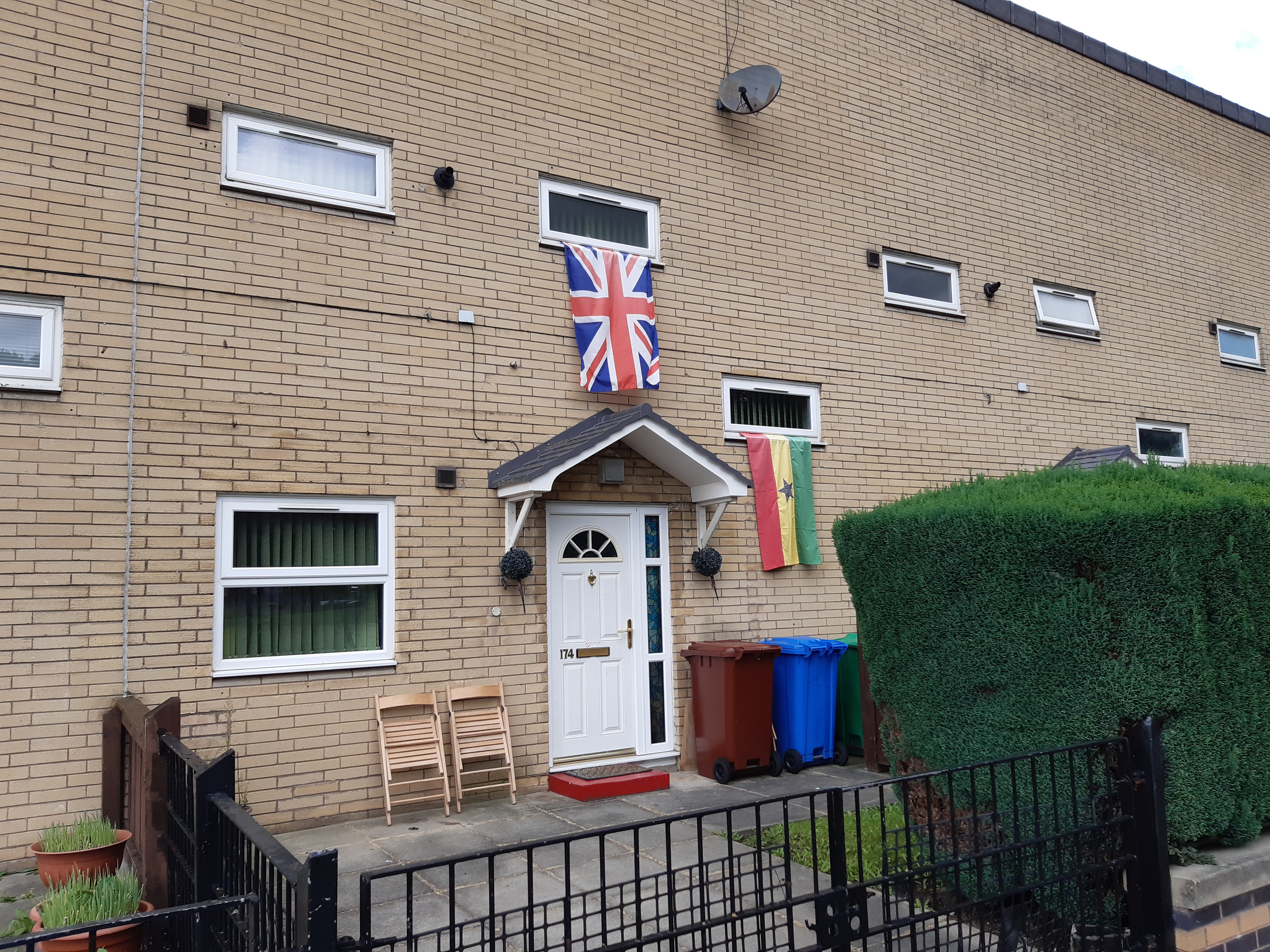
A Union Jack and Flag of Ghana flying together from a property in Moss Side, Manchester in 2023

Despite the recommendations of the Scarman Report (published in November 1981), relations between Black youths and police did not significantly improve and a further wave of nationwide conflicts occurred in Handsworth, Birmingham, in 1985, when the local South Asian community also became involved. Photographer and artist Pogus Caesar extensively documented the riots. Following the police shooting of a Black grandmother Cherry Groce in Brixton, and the so-called accidental death of Cynthia Jarrett during a police raid on her home in Tottenham, in north London, protests held at the local police stations did not end peacefully and further street battles with the police erupted, the disturbances later spreading to Manchester's Moss Side. The street battles themselves (involving more stone-throwing, the discharge of one firearm, and several fires) led to two fatalities (in the Broadwater Farm riot) and Brixton.

In 1999, following the Macpherson Inquiry into the 1993 killing of Stephen Lawrence, Sir Paul Condon, commissioner of the Metropolitan Police, accepted that his organisation was institutionally racist. Some members of the Black British community were involved in the 2001 Harehills race riot and 2005 Birmingham race riots.

===== Surveillance of Black populations =====
In the 1950s the British government became concerned about radicalisation within Black immigrant communities, and began measures to surveil them at large. For example, in Sheffield, police constables were authorised to "Observe, visit, and report" on the city's Black community, with authorisation for the creation of a card index of details such as address and place of employment of the city's then 534 residents.

Documents from the National Archives show that practices continued into the 1960s, with Manchester police creating reports on immigrant communities' "intermixing, miscegenation and illegitimacy", listing numbers of children by race.

=== Early 21st century ===
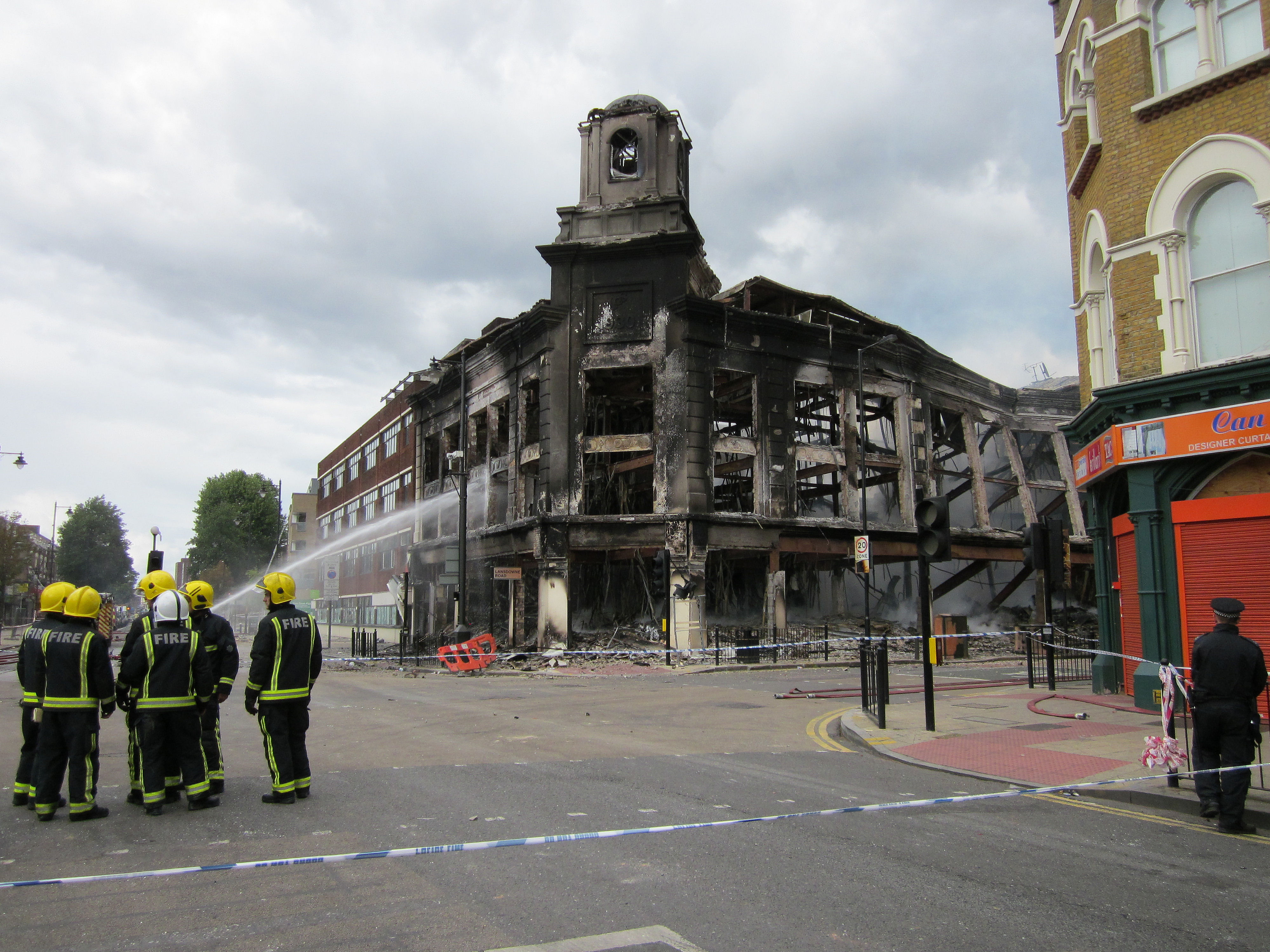
Firefighters douse a shop and flats destroyed by arson during the initial rioting in Tottenham.

In 2011, following the shooting of a mixed-race man, Mark Duggan, by police in Tottenham, a protest was held at the local police station. The protest ended with an outbreak of fighting between local youths and police officers leading to widespread disturbances across English cities.

Some analysts claimed that Black people were disproportionally represented in the 2011 England riots. Research suggests that race relations in Britain deteriorated in the period following the riots and that prejudice towards ethnic minorities increased. Groups such as the EDL and the BNP were said to be exploiting the situation. Racial tensions between Blacks and Asians in Birmingham increased after the deaths of three Asian men at the hands of a Black youth.

In a Newsnight discussion on 12 August 2011, historian David Starkey blamed "Black gangster and rap culture", saying that it had influenced youths of all races. Figures showed that 46 percent of people brought before a courtroom for arrests related to the 2011 riots were black.

During the COVID-19 pandemic in the United Kingdom the first ten healthcare workers to die from the virus came from Black and Minority Ethnic (BAME) backgrounds, prompting the head of the British Medical Association to call on the government to begin investigating if and why minorities are being disproportionally affected. Early statistics found that Black and Asian people were being affected worse than white people, with figures showing 35% of COVID-19 patients were non-white, and similar studies in the US had shown a clear racial disparity. The government announced that they will be launching an official inquiry into the disproportionate impact of coronavirus on Black, Asian and Minority Ethnic communities with Communities Minister Robert Jenrick acknowledging that "There does appear to be a disproportionate impact of the virus on BAME communities in the UK."

A social media campaign in response to the Clap for our Carers campaign, highlighted the role Black and minority health and key workers and asking the public to continue their support after the pandemic gained more than 12 million views online. 72 per cent of NHS Staff that died from COVID-19 were reported as being from Black & Minority Ethnic groups, far higher than the number of staff from BAME backgrounds working in the NHS, which stood at 44%. Statistics did show that black people were significantly over-represented, but that as the pandemic progressed the disparity in these figures was reducing. Reports discussed a number of complex contributing factors including health and income inequality, social and environmental factors were exacerbating and contributing to the spread of the disease unequally. In April 2020, after his sister's partner died from the virus, Patrick Vernon set up a fundraising initiative called "The Majonzi Fund" which will provide families with access to small financial grants that can be used to access bereavement counselling and organise memorial events and tributes after the social lockdown has been lifted.

After Brexit, EU nationals working in the health and social care sector were replaced by migrants from non-EU countries such as Nigeria. About 141,000 people came from Nigeria in 2023.

In 2024, Kemi Badenoch became the first Black leader of any major UK political party to lead the Conservative Party.

== Demographics ==
=== Population ===
Black British population by region and country
Region / Country	2021 (Note: 2021/22: England and Wales, Scotland, and Northern Ireland)		2011 (Note: 2011: England and Wales, Scotland, and Northern Ireland)		2001 (Note: 2001: England and Wales, Scotland, and Northern Ireland)		1991 (Note: 1991: Great Britain. Northern Ireland did not record ethnic group data in the 1991 census.)	
Region / Country	Number	%	Number	%	Number	%	Number	%
England	2,381,724	4.22%	1,846,614	3.48%	1,132,508	2.30%	874,882	1.86%
—Greater London	1,188,370	13.50%	1,088,640	13.32%	782,849	10.92%	535,216	8.01%
—West Midlands	269,019	4.52%	182,125	3.25%	104,032	1.98%	102,206	1.98%
—South East	221,584	2.39%	136,013	1.58%	56,914	0.71%	46,636	0.62%
—East of England	184,949	2.92%	117,442	2.01%	48,464	0.90%	42,310	0.84%
—North West	173,918	2.34%	97,869	1.39%	41,637	0.62%	47,478	0.71%
—East Midlands	129,986	2.66%	81,484	1.80%	39,477	0.95%	38,566	0.98%
—Yorkshire and the Humber	117,643	2.15%	80,345	1.52%	34,262	0.69%	36,634	0.76%
—South West	69,614	1.22%	49,476	0.94%	20,920	0.42%	21,779	0.47%
—North East	26,635	1.01%	13,220	0.51%	3,953	0.16%	4,057	0.16%
Scotland	65,414 (Note: Scotland held its census a year later after the rest of the United Kingdom due to the COVID-19 pandemic. As a result, data shown is for 2022 as opposed to 2021.)	1.20%	36,178	0.68%	6,247	0.12%	6,353	0.13%
Wales	27,554	0.89%	18,276	0.60%	7,069	0.24%	9,492	0.33%
Northern Ireland	11,032	0.58%	3,616	0.20%	1,136	0.07%	—N/a	—N/a
United Kingdom	2,485,724	3.71%	1,905,506	3.02%	1,148,738	1.95%	890,727 (Note: Figures are for Great Britain only, i.e. excludes Northern Ireland)	1.62%

==== 2021 census ====
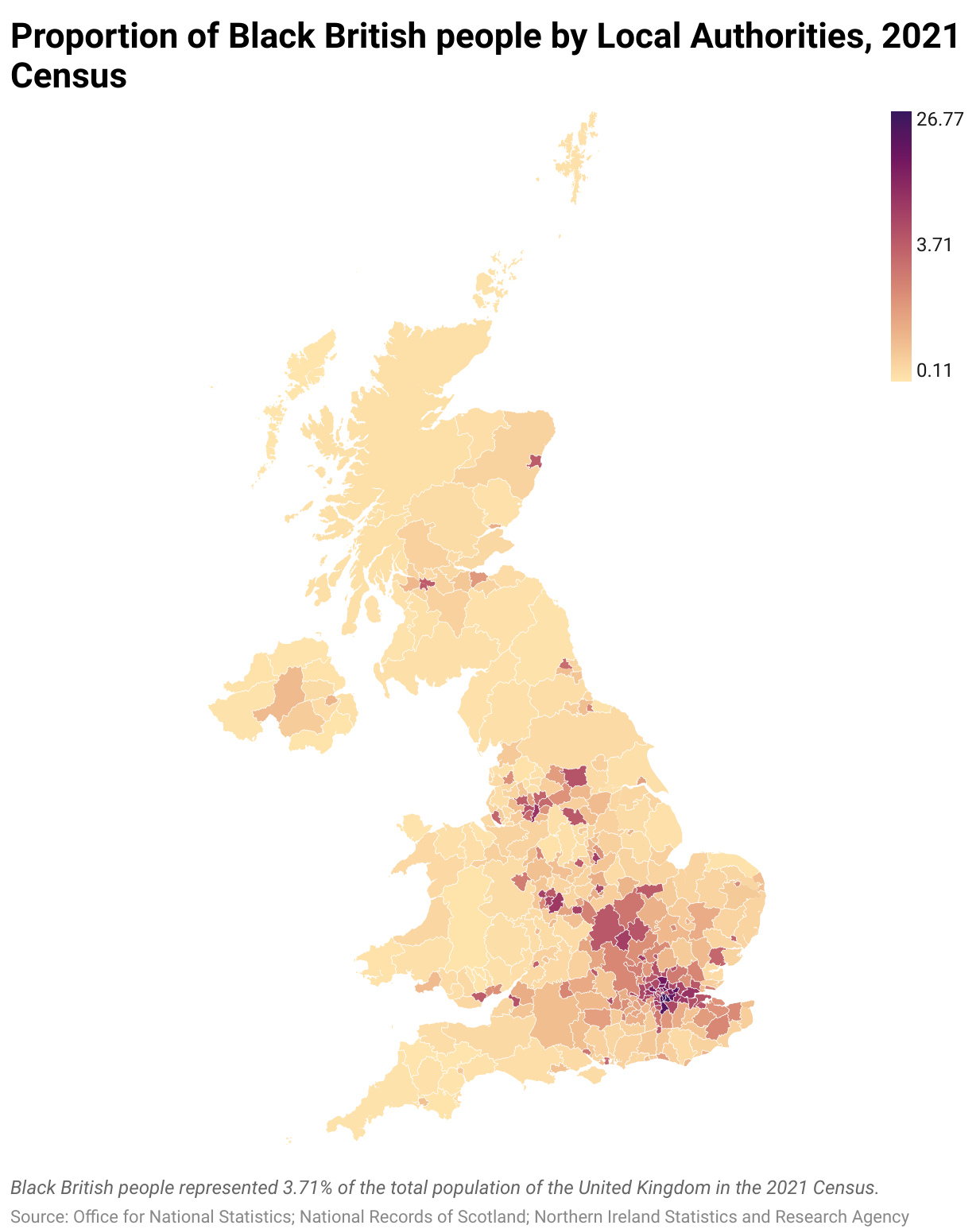
Distribution of Black British people by local authority, 2021 census

Black/Black British population pyramid in 2021 (in England and Wales)

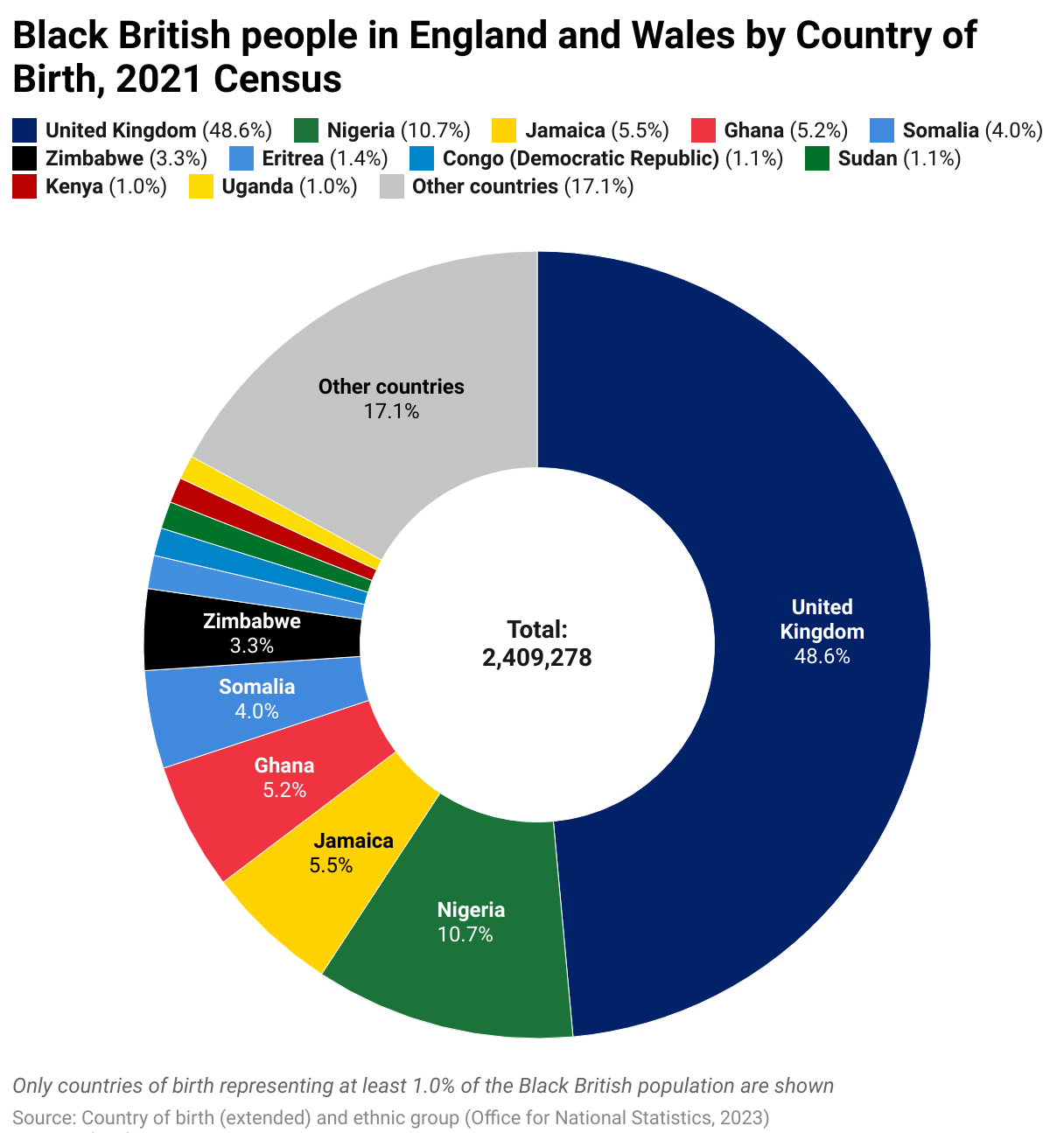
Country of birth (2021 census, England and Wales)

Year of arrival (2021 census, England and Wales) (Note: Combined figures for all categorised under 'Black, Black British, Black Welsh, Caribbean or African' including 'African', 'Caribbean' and 'Other Black')
1. Born in the UK (48.6%)
2. Before 1950 (0.05%)
3. 1951 to 1960 (1.30%)
4. 1961 to 1970 (3.20%)
5. 1971 to 1980 (1.20%)
6. 1981 to 1990 (3.10%)
7. 1991 to 2000 (8.40%)
8. 2001 to 2010 (17.6%)
9. 2011 to 2021 (16.6%)

In the 2021 census, 2,409,278 people in England and Wales were recorded within the Black ethnic groups (Black, Black British, Black Welsh, Caribbean or African), accounting for around 4.0% of the population. Separate Mixed or Multiple ethnic groups included 1.1% identifying as White and Black Caribbean and 0.8% as White and Black African. In Northern Ireland, 11,032, or 0.6% of the population, identified as Black African or Black Other. The census in Scotland was delayed for a year and took place in 2022, the equivalent figure was 65,414, representing 1.2% of the population. The ten local authorities with the largest proportion of people who identified as Black were all located in London: Lewisham (26.77%), Southwark (25.13%), Lambeth (23.97%), Croydon (22.64%), Barking and Dagenham (21.39%), Hackney (21.09%), Greenwich (20.96%), Enfield (18.34%), Haringey (17.58%) and Brent (17.51%). Outside of London, Manchester had the largest proportion at 11.94%. In Scotland, the highest proportion was in Aberdeen at 4.20%; in Wales, the highest concentration was in Cardiff at 3.84%; and in Northern Ireland, the highest concentration was in Belfast at 1.34%.

==== 2011 census ====
The 2011 UK census recorded 1,904,684 residents who identified as "Black/African/Caribbean/Black British", accounting for 3 per cent of the total UK population. This was the first UK census where the number of self-reported Black African residents exceeded that of Black Caribbeans.

Within England and Wales, 989,628 individuals specified their ethnicity as "Black African", 594,825 as "Black Caribbean", and 280,437 as "Other Black". In Northern Ireland, 2,345 individuals self-reported as "Black African", 372 as "Black Caribbean", and 899 as "Other Black", totaling 3,616 "Black" residents. In Scotland, 29,638 persons identified themselves as "African", choosing either the "African, African Scottish or African British" tick box or the "Other African" tick box and write-in area. 6,540 individuals also self-reported as "Caribbean or Black", selecting either the "Caribbean, Caribbean Scottish or Caribbean British" tick box, the "Black, Black Scottish or Black British" tick box, or the "Other Caribbean or Black" tick box and write-in area. In order to compare UK-wide results, the Office for National Statistics combined the "African" and "Caribbean or Black" entries at the top-level, and reported a total of 36,178 "Black" residents in Scotland. According to the ONS, individuals in Scotland with "Other African", "White" and "Asian" ethnicities as well as "Black" identities could thus all potentially be captured within this combined output. The General Register Office for Scotland, which devised the categories and administers the Scotland census, does not combine the "African" and "Caribbean or Black" entries, maintaining them as separate for individuals who do not self-identify as "Black" (see census classification).

==== 2001 census ====
In the 2001 census, 575,876 people in the United Kingdom had reported their ethnicity as "Black Caribbean", 485,277 as "Black African", and 97,585 as "Black Other", making a total of 1,148,738 "Black or Black British" residents. This was equivalent to 2 per cent of the UK population at the time.

=== Population distribution ===
Most Black Britons can be found in the large cities and metropolitan areas of the country. The 2011 census found that 1.85 million of a total Black population of 1.9 million lived in England, with 1.09 million of those in London, where they made up 13.3 per cent of the population, compared to 3.5 per cent of England's population and 3 per cent of the UK's population. The ten local authorities with the highest proportion of their populations describing themselves as Black in the census were all in London: Lewisham (27.2 per cent), Southwark (26.9 per cent), Lambeth (25.9 per cent), Hackney (23.1 per cent), Croydon (20.2 per cent), Barking and Dagenham (20.0 per cent), Newham (19.6 per cent), Greenwich (19.1 per cent), Haringey (18.8 per cent) and Brent (18.8 per cent). More specifically, for Black Africans the highest local authority was Southwark (16.4 per cent) followed by Barking and Dagenham (15.4 per cent) and Greenwich (13.8 per cent), whereas for Black Caribbeans the highest was Lewisham (11.2 per cent) followed by Lambeth (9.5 per cent) and Croydon (8.6 per cent).

Outside of London, the next largest populations are in Birmingham (125,760, 11%) / Coventry (30,723, 9%) / Sandwell (29,779, 8.7%) / Wolverhampton (24,636, 9.3%), Manchester (65,893, 12%), Nottingham (32,215, 10%), Leicester (28,766, 8%), Bristol (27,890, 6%), Leeds (25,893, 5.6%), Sheffield (25,512, 4.6%) and Luton (22,735, 10%).

=== Religion ===
Religion	England and Wales			
Religion	2011		2021	
Religion	Number	%	Number	%
Christianity	1,288,371	69.1%	1,613,753	67.0%
Islam	272,015	14.6%	416,327	17.3%
No religion	137,467	7.4%	205,375	8.5%
Buddhism	2,809	0.2%	2,336	0.1%
Hinduism	5,474	0.3%	1,919	0.08%
Judaism	1,611	0.09%	1,632	0.07%
Sikhism	1,431	0.08%	306	0.01%
Other religions	7,099	0.4%	13,413	0.6%
Not Stated	148,613	8.0%	154,219	6.4%
Total	1,864,890	100%	2,409,280	100%

=== Mixed marriages ===
An academic journal article published in 2005, citing sources from 1997 and 2001, estimated that nearly half of British-born African-Caribbean men, a third of British-born African-Caribbean women, and a fifth of African men, have white partners. In 2014, The Economist reported that, according to the Labour Force Survey, 48 per cent of Black Caribbean men and 34 per cent of Black Caribbean women in couples have partners from a different ethnic group. Moreover, mixed-race children under the age of ten with Black Caribbean and white parents outnumber Black Caribbean children by two-to-one.

== Culture and community ==
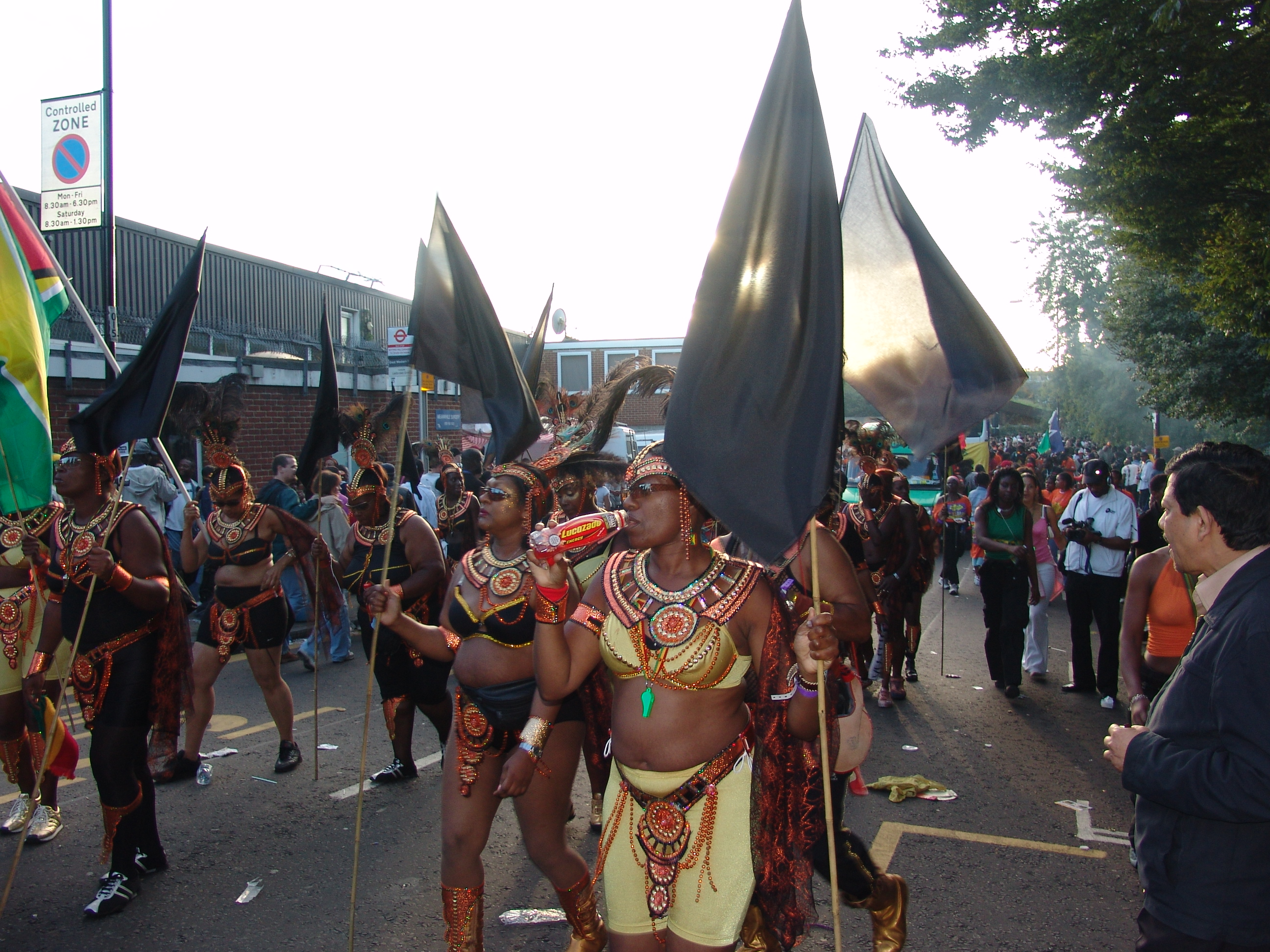
Notting Hill Carnival in London

=== Dialect ===
Multicultural London English is a variety of the English language spoken by a large number of the Black British population of Afro-Caribbean ancestry. British Black dialect has been influenced by Jamaican Patois owing to the large number of immigrants from Jamaica, but it is also spoken or imitated by those of different ancestry.

British Black speech is also heavily influenced by social class and regional dialect (Cockney, Mancunian, Brummie, Scouse, etc.).

African-born immigrants speak African languages and French as well as English.

=== Music ===
Black British music is a long-established and influential part of British music. Its presence in the United Kingdom stretches back to the 18th century, encompassing concert performers such as George Bridgetower and street musicians the likes of Billy Waters. Samuel Coleridge-Taylor (1875–1912) achieved great success as a composer at the end of the 19th and early 20th centuries. The Jazz Age also had taken an effect on the generation.

In the late 1970s and 1980s, 2 Tone became popular with the British youth; especially in the West Midlands. A blend of punk, ska and pop made it a favourite among both white and Black audiences. Famous bands in the genre include the Selecter, the Specials, the Beat and the Bodysnatchers.

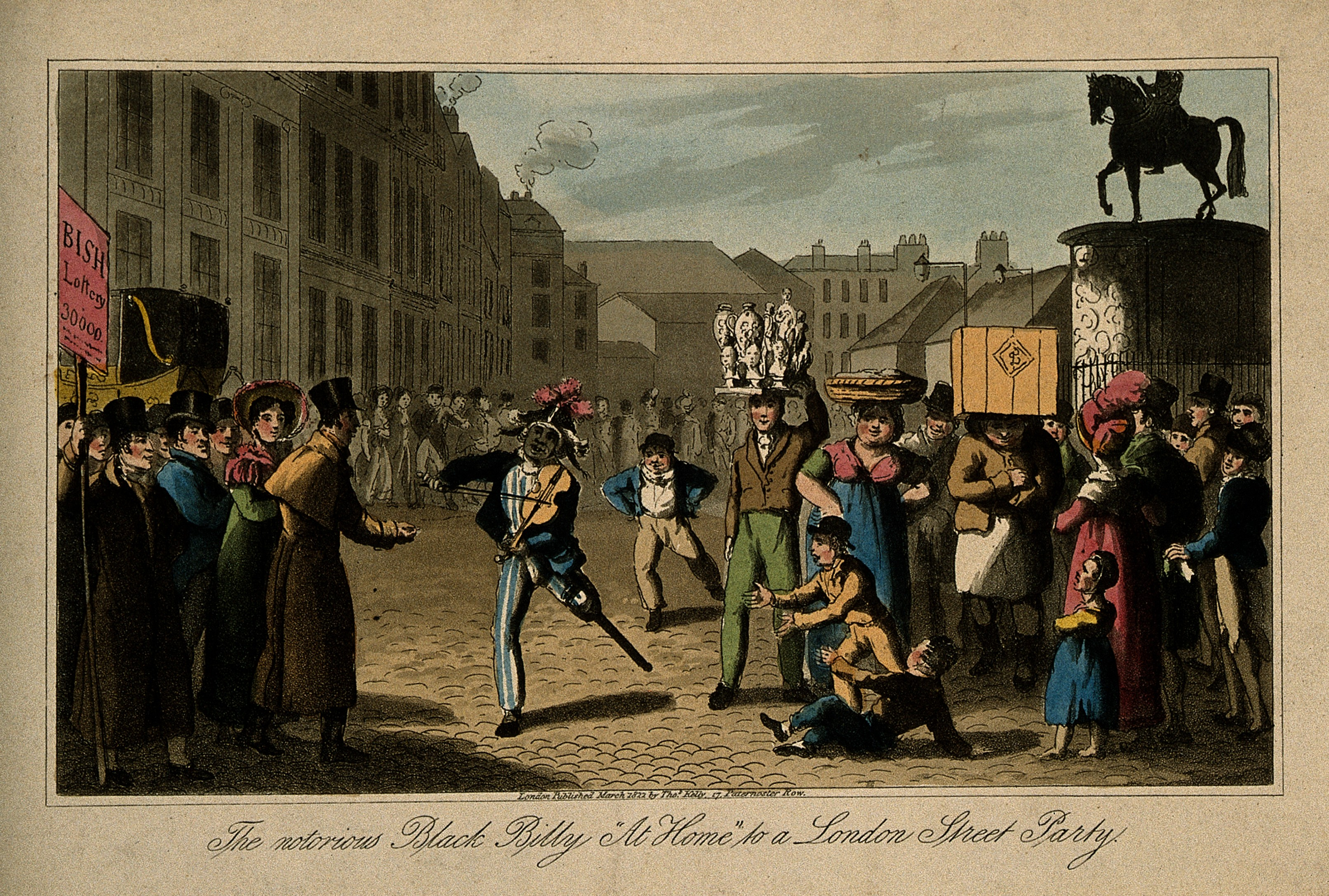
Billy Waters busking in London during the early 19th century.

Jungle, dubstep, drum and bass, UK garage and grime music originated in London.

The MOBO Awards recognise performers of "Music of Black Origin".

Black Lives in Music (BLiM) was formed after its founders noticed institutionalised racism in the British entertainment industry. BLiM works for equal opportunities for Black, Asian and ethnically diverse people in the jazz and classical music industry, opportunities that include the chance to learn a musical instrument, attend a music school, pursue a career in music and reach senior levels within the sector without facing discrimination.

=== Media ===
The Black community in Britain has a number of significant publications. The leading key publication is The Voice newspaper, founded by Val McCalla in 1982, and Britain's only national Black weekly newspaper. The Voice primarily targets the Caribbean diaspora and has been printed for more than 35 years. Secondly, the Black History Month magazine is a central point of focus which leads the nationwide celebration of Black History, Arts and Culture throughout the UK. Pride Magazine, published since 1991, is the largest monthly magazine that targets Black British, mixed-race, African and African-Caribbean women in the United Kingdom. In 2007, The Guardian reported that the magazine had dominated the Black women's magazine market for more than 15 years. Keep The Faith magazine is a multi-award-winning Black and minority ethnic community magazine produced quarterly since 2005. Keep The Faith's editorial contributors are some of the most powerful and influential movers and shakers, and successful entrepreneurs within BME communities.

Many major Black British publications are handled through Diverse Media Group, which specialises in helping organisations reach Britain's Black and minority ethnic community through the main media they consume. The senior leadership team is a composite of many CEO and owners from the publications listed above.

==== Publishing ====
Among Black-led publishing companies established in the UK are New Beacon Books (co-founded 1966 by John La Rose), Allison and Busby (co-founded 1967 by Margaret Busby), Bogle-L'Ouverture Publications (co-founded 1969 by Jessica Huntley and Eric Huntley), Hansib (founded 1970), Karnak House (founded 1975 by Amon Saba Saakana), Black Ink Collective (founded in 1978), Black Womantalk (founded in 1983), Karnak House (founded by Buzz Johnson), Tamarind Books (founded 1987 by Verna Wilkins), and others. The International Book Fair of Radical Black and Third World Books (1982–1995) was an initiative launched by New Beacon Books, Bogle-L'Ouverture Publications and the Race Today Collective.

== Social issues ==
=== Racism ===
Black people in the United Kingdom have historically experienced racism and discrimination. Research in the first decade of the 21st century has suggested that while racist attitudes in general have declined, Black British people still experience racism, discrimination and violence, as well as inequalities in health, education, housing, employment, politics, the criminal justice system, and healthcare.

Black immigrants who arrived in Britain from the Caribbean in the 1950s faced significant amounts of racism. Historian Winston James suggests that the experience of racism in Britain was a major factor in the development of a shared Caribbean identity amongst Black immigrants from a range of different island and class backgrounds.

Many Caribbean immigrants first experienced discrimination when trying to find private accommodation, as there was no anti-discrimination legislation to prevent landlords from refusing to accept Black tenants, and they were generally ineligible for council housing until they had been resident in the UK for five years. A survey undertaken in Birmingham in 1956 found that only 1.5% of white people surveyed would let a room to a Black tenant. As a result, many Black immigrants were forced to live in poor quality housing in urban slum areas, where there were often problems with crime, violence and prostitution. Notorious slum landlord Peter Rachman owned around 100 properties in the Notting Hill area of London, where Black people lived. Black tenants typically paid twice the rent of white tenants, and lived in conditions of extreme overcrowding.

In the 1970s and 1980s, Black people in Britain were the victims of racist violence perpetrated by far-right groups such as the National Front. During this period, it was also common for Black footballers to be subjected to racist chanting from crowd members. Opposition to interracial marriage remained significant throughout the 1980s, but negative attitudes towards Black and Asian people generally declined by the mid-1990s.

In 2006, the University of Maryland's Minorities at Risk (MAR) project said that despite the United Kingdom's attempts to address racism, its anti-racism laws and policies remained "ineffective". It found that African-Caribbean people in the United Kingdom continued to face "persistent economic and political discrimination", including in housing, employment, education, insurance, religious worship, and the criminal justice system. In 2008, research by academic Robert Ford found that attitudes towards Black people had generally improved but that "Racism and racial discrimination remain a part of everyday life for Britain's ethnic minorities". He said this had continuing negative impacts in housing, employment, and health.

In 2018, Martin Hewitt of the Metropolitan Police suggested that knife crime in Britain, and especially London, does not get "the sense of collective outrage that it ought to do" because it disproportionately affects Black communities. A 2023 University of Cambridge survey, which featured the largest sample of Black people in Britain, found that 88% had reported racial discrimination at work, 79% believed the police unfairly targeted Black people with stop and search powers, and 80% definitely or somewhat agreed that discrimination in education was the biggest barrier to academic attainment for young Black students.

=== Education ===
A government report from 2006 found that pupils of Nigerian and Ghanaian origin achieved some of the highest GCSE and A-level results among ethnic groups in England. According to Department for Education statistics for the 2021–22 academic year, Black British pupils attained below the national average for academic performance at both A-Level and GCSE level. 12.3% of Black British pupils achieved at least 3 As at A Level and an average score of 48.6 was achieved in Attainment 8 scoring at GCSE level. A disparity exists in academic performance between Black African pupils and Black Caribbean pupils at GCSE level. Black African pupils achieved better results than both white pupils and the national average, with an average score of 50.9 and 54.5% of pupils achieving grade 5 or above in both English and Maths GCSE. Meanwhile, Black Caribbean pupils attained an average score of 41.7 with only 34.6% of pupils attaining grade 5 or above in both English and Maths GCSE. Black supplementary schools, also known as Saturday schools, emerged in Britain from the late 1960s and 1970s as community-led initiatives aimed at addressing educational inequalities and supporting Black children within the mainstream education system. Often organised by parents, activists and community groups, these schools provided additional instruction in core subjects as well as teaching Black history and cultural identity.

A 2019 report by Universities UK found that student's race and ethnicity significantly affect their degree outcomes. According to this report from 2017–18, there was a 13% gap between the likelihood of white students and Black and Minority Ethnic (BAME) students graduating with a first or 2:1 degree classification at British universities.

Students in England getting at least 3 A grades at A level (2021/22)
Ethnic Group	%
Chinese	36.8
Indian	28.4
All ethnic groups (average)	23.1
Mixed	21.1
White	20.7
Bangladeshi	16.5
Pakistani	15.8
Black	12.3
Gypsy/Roma	2.2

GCSE Attainment 8 score (out of 90.0) (2022/23)
Ethnic group	Average
Chinese	65.5
Indian	59.4
Bangladeshi	51.9
Pakistani	47.0
Mixed	46.7
Black	46.6
All ethnic groups (average)	46.3
White	45.2
Gypsy/Roma	20.3

Pupils in England getting a grade 5 or above in English and maths GCSE (2021/22)
Ethnic group	%
Chinese	80.0
Indian	73.0
Bangladeshi	62.1
Pakistani	51.2
Mixed	49.9
All ethnic groups (average)	49.8
Black	49.4
White	47.9
Gypsy/Roma	8.5

=== Employment ===
According to the 2005 TUC report Black workers, jobs and poverty, Black and minority ethnic people (BMEs) were more likely to be unemployed than the White population. The rate of unemployment among the White population was 5%, but among ethnic minority groups it was Bangladeshi 17%, Pakistani 15%, Mixed 15%, Black Britons 13%, Other ethnic 12% and Indian 7%. Of the different ethnic groups studied, Asians had the highest poverty rate of 45% (after housing costs), Black Britons 38% and Chinese/other 32% (compared to a poverty rate of 20% for the White population). However, the report did concede that things were slowly improving.

According to 2012 data compiled by the Office for National Statistics, 50% of young Black men from 16-24 demographics were unemployed between Q4 2011 and Q1 2012.

A 2014 study by the Black Training and Enterprise Group (BTEG), funded by Trust for London, explored the views of young Black males in London on why their demographic have a higher unemployment rate than any other group of young people, finding that many young Black men in London believe that racism and negative stereotyping are the main reasons for their high unemployment rate.

In 2021, 67% of Black 16 to 64-year-olds were employed, compared to 76% of White British and 69% of British Asians. The employment rate for Black 16 to 24-year-olds was 31%, compared to 56% of White British and 37% of British Asians. The median hourly pay for Black Britons in 2021 was amongst the lowest out of all ethnicity groups at £12.55, ahead of only British Pakistanis and Bangladeshis. In 2023, the Office for National Statistics published more granular analysis and found that UK-born Black employees (£15.18) earned more than UK-born white employees (£14.26) in 2022, while non-UK born Black employees earned less (£12.95). Overall, Black employees had a median hourly pay of £13.53 in 2022. According to Department for Work and Pensions data for between 2018 and 2021, 24% of Black families were in receipt of income-related benefits, compared to 16% of White British families and 8% of British Chinese and Indian families. Black families were also the most likely ethnicity to be in receipt of housing benefit, council tax reduction, and reside in social housing. However, White British families (54%) were the most likely out of all ethnic groups to receive state support with 27% of White British families in receipt of the state pension.

=== Crime ===
Both racist crime and gang-related crime continues to affect Black communities, so much so that the Metropolitan Police launched Operation Trident to tackle so-called 'black-on-black' crime. Numerous deaths in police custody of Black men has generated a general distrust of police among some Black communities in the UK. According to the Metropolitan Police Authority in 2002–03 of the 17 deaths in police custody, 10 were Black or Asian – Black convicts have a disproportionately higher rate of incarceration than convicts of other ethnicities. The government reports The overall number of racist incidents recorded by the police rose by 7 per cent from 49,078 in 2002/03 to 52,694 in 2003/04.

Media representation of young Black British people has focused particularly on "gangs" with Black members and violent crimes involving Black victims and perpetrators. According to a Home Office report, 10 per cent of all murder victims between 2000 and 2004 were Black. Of these, 56 per cent were murdered by other Black people (with 44 per cent of Black people murdered by whites and Asians – making Black people disproportionately higher victims of killing by people from other ethnicities). In addition, a Freedom of Information request made by The Daily Telegraph shows internal police data that provides a breakdown of the ethnicity of the 18,091 men and boys who police took action against for a range of offences in London in October 2009. Among those proceeded against for street crimes, 54 per cent were Black; for robbery, 59 per cent; and for gun crimes, 67 per cent. According to the Office for National Statistics, 18.4% of homicide suspects in England and Wales from March 2019 to March 2021 were Black.

Black people, who according to government statistics make up 2 per cent of the population, are the principal suspects in 11.7 per cent of murders, i.e. in 252 out of 2163 murders committed 2001/2, 2002/3, and 2003/4. Judging on the basis of prison population, a substantial minority (about 35%) of Black criminals in the United Kingdom are not British citizens but foreign nationals. In November 2009, the Home Office published a study that showed that, once other variables had been accounted for, ethnicity was not a significant predictor of offending, anti-social behaviour or drug abuse among young people.

After several high-profile investigations such as that of the murder of Stephen Lawrence, the police have been accused of racism, from both within and outside the service. Cressida Dick, head of the Metropolitan Police's anti-racism unit in 2003, remarked that it was "difficult to imagine a situation where we will say we are no longer institutionally racist". Black people were seven times more likely to be stopped and searched by police compared to white people, according to the Home Office. A separate study said Black people were more than nine times more likely to be searched.

In 2010, Black Britons accounted for around 2.2% of the general UK population, but made up 15% of the British prison population, which experts say is "a result of decades of racial prejudice in the criminal justice system and an overly punitive approach to penal affairs." This proportion decreased to 12.4% by the end of 2022 even though Black Britons now made up around 3–4% of the British population. In the prison environment, Black prisoners are the most likely to be involved in violent incidents. In 2020, Black prisoners were most likely out of all ethnic groups to be assailants (319 incidents for every 1,000 prisoners) or involved in violent incidents with no clear victim or assailant (185 incidents for every 1,000 prisoners). In the same year, 32% of children in prison were Black in contrast to 47% of prisoners aged under 18 being White. The Lammy Review, led by David Lammy MP, provided potential reasons on the disproportionate number of Black children in prisons including austerity in public services, lack of diversity in the judiciary, and the school system inadequately serving the Black community by failing to identify learning difficulties.

=== Health ===
For some key health measures, including life expectancy, general mortality and many of the leading causes of death in the UK, Black Britons have better outcomes than their white British counterparts. As an example, compared to the white population in England, cancer rates are 4% lower in Black people, who are also less likely to die of the disease than whites. Generally, Black people in England and Wales have a significantly lower mortality rate from all-causes than whites. Black people in England and Wales also have a higher life expectancy at birth than their white counterparts. One contributing factor put forward is that white Britons are more likely to smoke and to drink harmful levels of alcohol. In England, 3.6% of white Britons have harmful or dependant drinking behaviours compared to 2.3% of Black people. In 2019, 14.4% of whites in England smoked cigarettes, compared to 9.7% of Black people.

Black Britons face worse outcomes in some health measurements compared to the rest of the population. Out of all ethnicity groups, Black people were the most likely to be overweight or obese, the most likely to be dependant on drugs, as well as the most likely to have common mental disorders. 72% of bBlack people in Britain are overweight or obese compared to 64.5% of White British people and 7.5% of Black people are dependant on drugs compared to 3.0% of White British people. 22.5% of Black people experienced a common mental disorder (including depression, OCD and life anxiety) in the past week compared to 17.3% of White British people, with this figure rising to 29.3% for Black women. Black women are also 3.7 times more likely to die from childbirth than white women in the UK, equating to 34 women per 100,000 giving birth. Racist attitudes towards the pain tolerances of Black women have been cited as one reason why this disparity exists. In 2021, Black Britons had the highest rate of STIs with a new STI rate of 1702.6 per 100,000 population compared to 373.9 per 100,000 population in the White British population. This is consistent with data since at least 1994, and potential reasons to explain the difference include poor healthy literacy, underlying socioeconomic factors, and racism in healthcare settings. In 2022, the British Medical Journal reported findings from a survey revealing 65% of Black people have said that they had experienced prejudice from doctors and other staff in healthcare settings, rising to 75% among Black 18-34 year olds. Another survey found that 64% of Black people in the UK believe that the NHS provides better care to white people.

During the COVID-19 pandemic in the United Kingdom, the Black population faced severe disparity in outcomes compared to the white population, with early data between March and April 2020 revealing that black people were four times more likely to die with Covid-19 than white people. An inquiry commissioned for the government found that racism contributed to the disproportionate death of Black people. As the Covid-19 vaccine began to be distributed, the UK Household Longitudinal Study found that 72% of Black people were unlikely or very unlikely to get vaccinated compared to 82% of all people saying they were likely or very likely to get the jab. In March 2021, uptake was 30% lower for the Black population aged 50–60 compared to the same age group in the white population. Vaccine hesitancy was driven by unethical health treatments towards Black people in the past, with many surveyed citing the Tuskegee Syphilis Study in the United States as an example. Another reason given was the lack of trust in the authorities and the perception that Black people were being targeted as guinea pigs for the vaccine which was spurred by misinformation online and some religious organisations. Analysis from the Commission on Race and Ethnic Disparities found that the increased risk of dying from COVID-19 was mainly due to the increased risk of exposure. Black people were more likely to live in urban areas with higher population densities and levels of deprivation; work in higher risk occupations such as healthcare or transport; and to live with older relatives who themselves are at higher risk due to their age or having other comorbidities such as diabetes and obesity.

== Notable Black British people ==
=== Pre-20th century ===
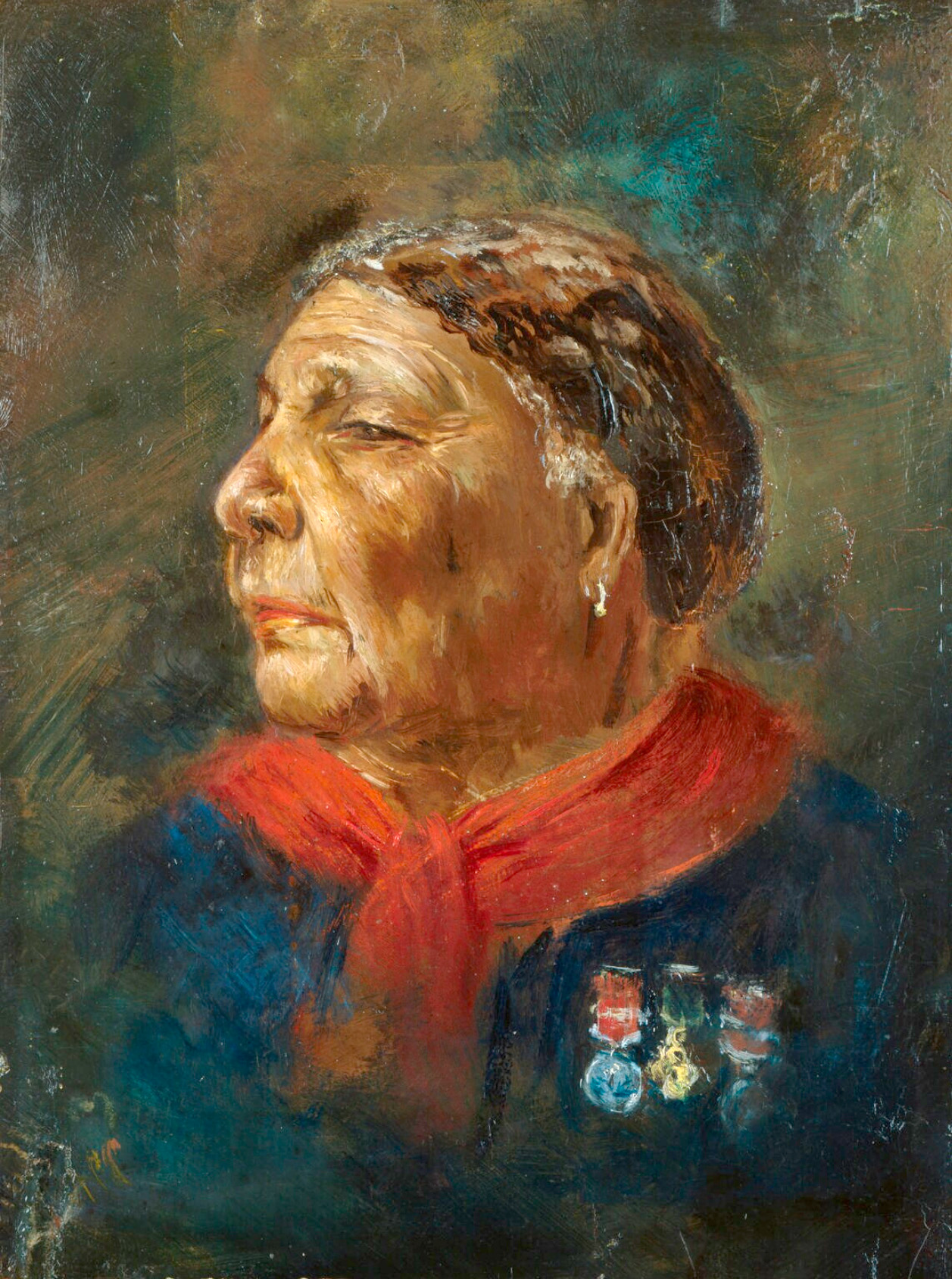
A Crimean War nurse, Mary Seacole has been dubbed the "Greatest Black Briton."

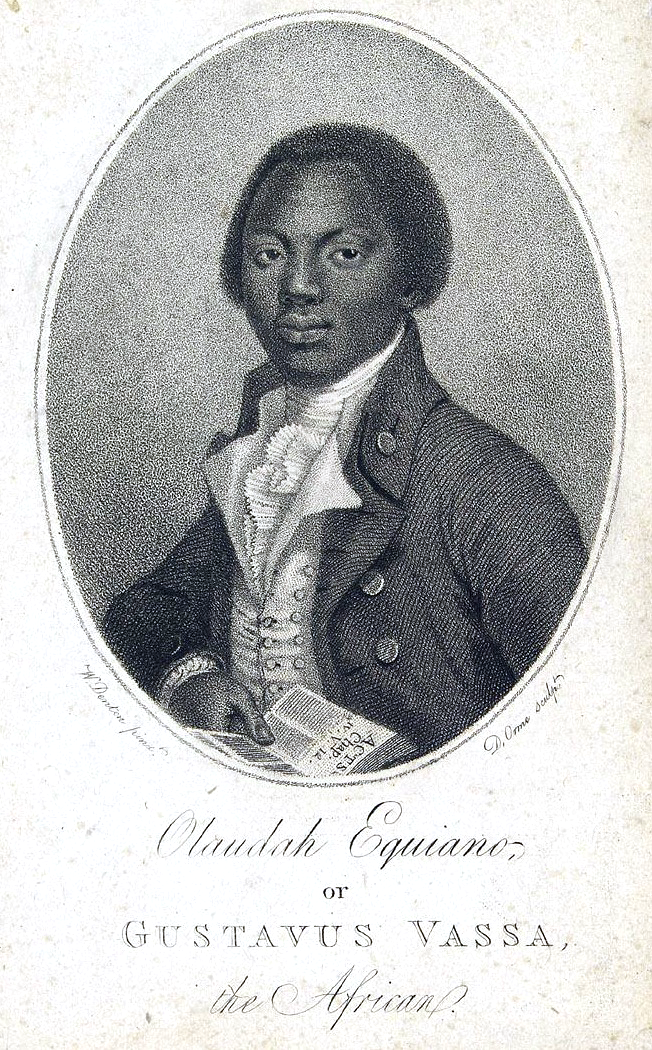
Olaudah Equiano, a significant figure involved with the abolition of the Atlantic Slave Trade.

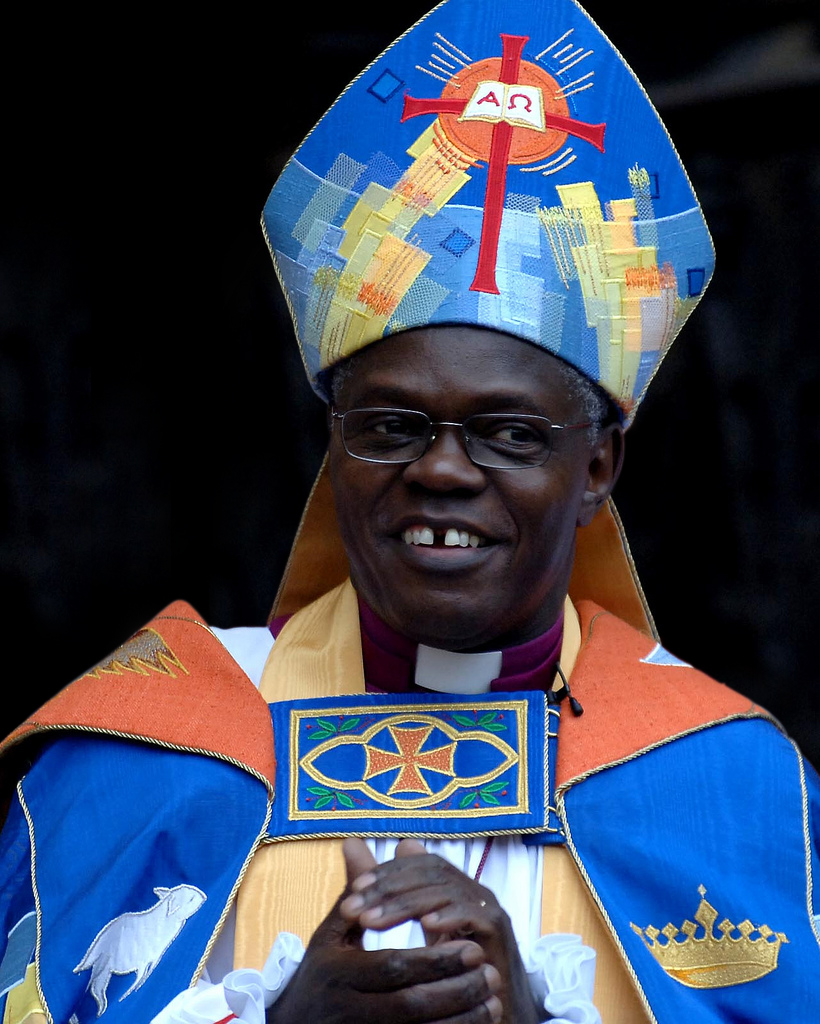
Lord Sentamu, a former archbishop of York, the second most senior clerical position in the Church of England.

Well-known Black Britons living before the 20th century include the Chartist William Cuffay; William Davidson, who was executed as a Cato Street conspirator; Olaudah Equiano (also called Gustavus Vassa), a former enslaved man who bought his freedom, moved to England, and settled in Soham, Cambridgeshire, where he married and wrote an autobiography, dying in 1797; Ukawsaw Gronniosaw, pioneer of the slave narrative; and Ignatius Sancho, a grocer who also acquired a reputation as a man of letters.

In 2004, a poll found that people considered the Crimean War heroine Mary Seacole to be the greatest Black Briton. Seacole was born in Jamaica in 1805 to a white father and Black mother. A statue of her, designed by Martin Jennings, was unveiled in the grounds of St. Thomas' Hospital opposite the Houses of Parliament in London in June 2016, following a 12-year campaign that raised £500,000 to honour her.

=== Recognition ===
A number of awards and honours exist to recognise talent and influence of the Black British community. The MOBO Awards, was the first awards ceremony that celebrates the achievements in music of Black origin, launched in 1996. Founder Kanya King was subsequently awarded both a MBE and a CBE for her services to the music industry, and the awards have taken place annually since its inauguration.

The Powerlist is an annual list of the 100 most influential people of African or African Caribbean heritage in the UK. The list was first created in 2007 by Michael Eboda, then editor of the New Nation, a weekly newspaper published in the UK for the Black British community, as a way to profile and celebrate influential Black Britons, and inspire and influence the next generation. The list is updated annually and has been published in book format by Powerful Media since 2007. The Powerlist is not limited to British born citizens and it includes individuals born overseas who have emigrated to the UK. The 50 highest rated nominees, along with updates on the previous year's Powerlistees from rank 2–100, are then ranked by an independent panel in the summer, with the list being produced each autumn. Each year's highest ranking individual is added to the Powerlist Hall of Fame.

In 2014, Melanie Eusebe and Sophie Chandauka co-founded the Black British Business Awards, to celebrate the contributions of inspiring professionals across all UK Industries.

The British Ethnic Diversity Sports Awards (BEDSA) were launched in 2016, celebrating the contribution of and achievements of ethnic minority sportspeople and have included awards presented to cricketer Jofra Archer and athlete Christine Ohuruogu.

The inaugural Black British Theatre Awards, co-founded by activist Solange Urdang and theatre director and choreographer Omar F. Okai, took place in October 2019 at Old Finsbury Town Hall hosted by Ore Oduba, with winners including Lynette Linton for best Director, Beverley Knight MBE for supporting actress and Hamilton as best musical production.

=== Nobility ===
Some British aristocrats descend from the Afro-Russian courtier General Abram Petrovich Gannibal, including Natalia Grosvenor, Duchess of Westminster and her sister Alexandra Hamilton, Duchess of Abercorn – the daughters of Georgina, Lady Kennard – and their descendants (such as Natalia's son Hugh Grosvenor, 7th Duke of Westminster). George Mountbatten, 4th Marquess of Milford Haven and his brother Lord Ivar Mountbatten are also direct descendants as the grandsons of Nadejda Mountbatten, Marchioness of Milford Haven.

In addition to this, both the bi-racial royal Prince Archie of Sussex and the bi-racial aristocrat John Thynn, Viscount Weymouth are heirs apparent to the dukedom of Sussex and the marquessate of Bath, respectively. Other mixed-race descendants of British nobles include the philosopher Kwame Anthony Appiah (who is the great-grandson of Charles Cripps, 1st Baron Parmoor), the actor Adetomiwa Edun (who is the aforementioned Lord Parmoor's great-great-grandson), the writer James Forman Jr. (who is the great-grandson of David Freeman-Mitford, 2nd Baron Redesdale), the actress Lady Naomi Gordon-Lennox (the adopted daughter of Charles Gordon-Lennox, 10th Duke of Richmond), and the models Adwoa and Kesewa Aboah (who are the great-granddaughters of Anthony Lowther, Viscount Lowther).

=== Politics ===
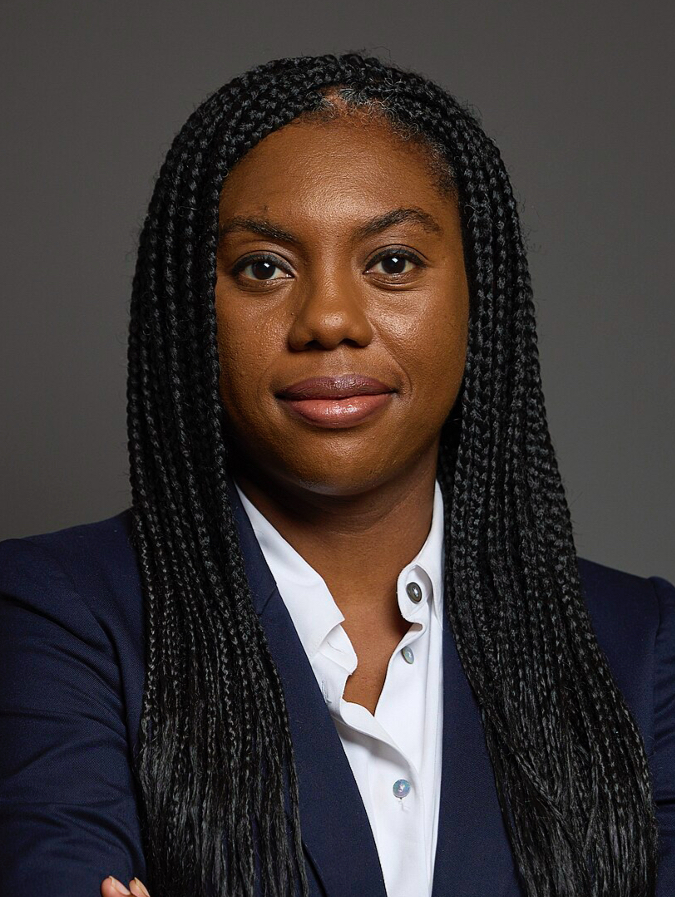
Kemi Badenoch, the current Leader of the Conservative Party, the first Black woman to lead a major British party

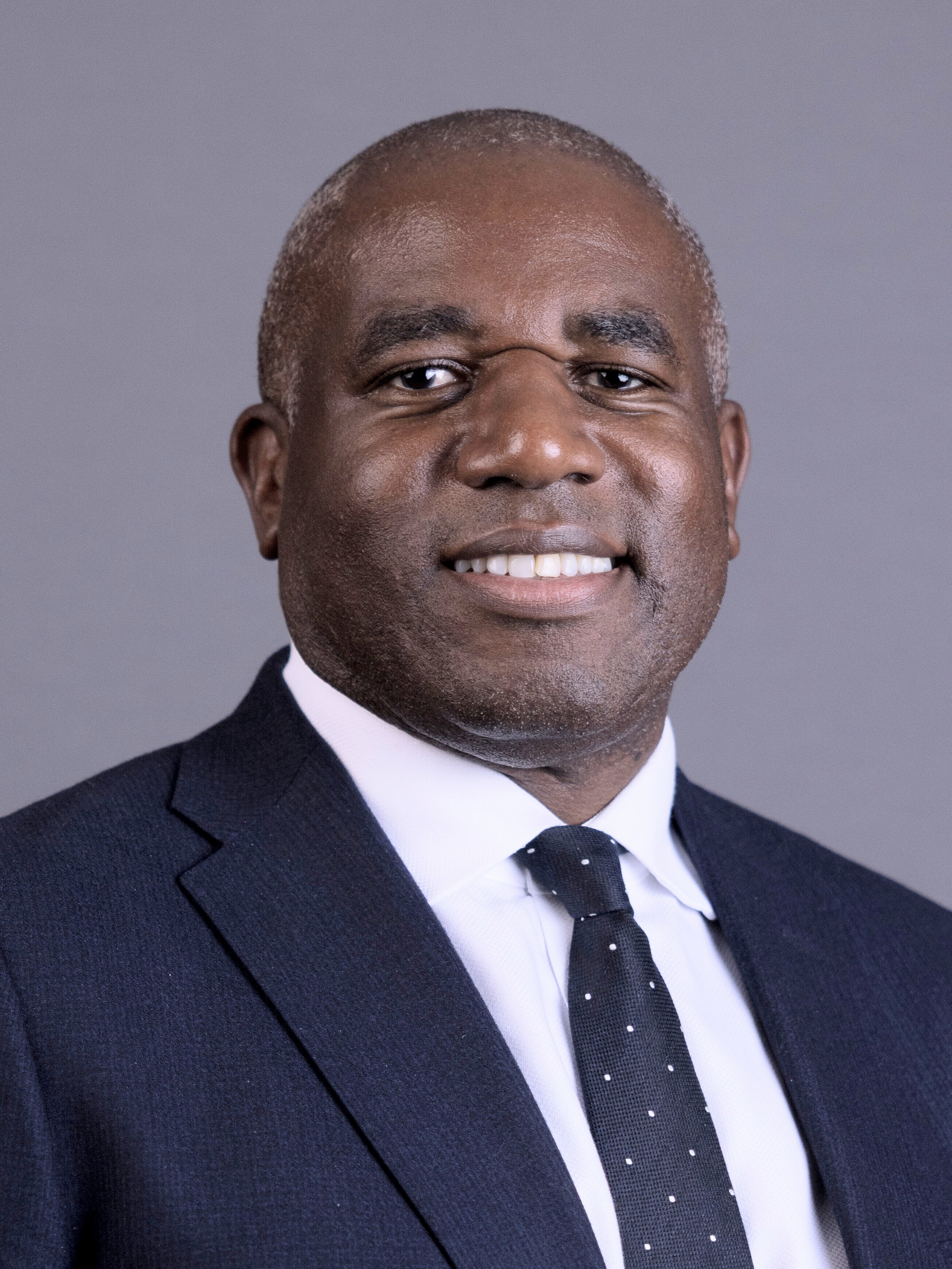
David Lammy, former Deputy Prime Minister, Foreign Secretary, Lord Chancellor

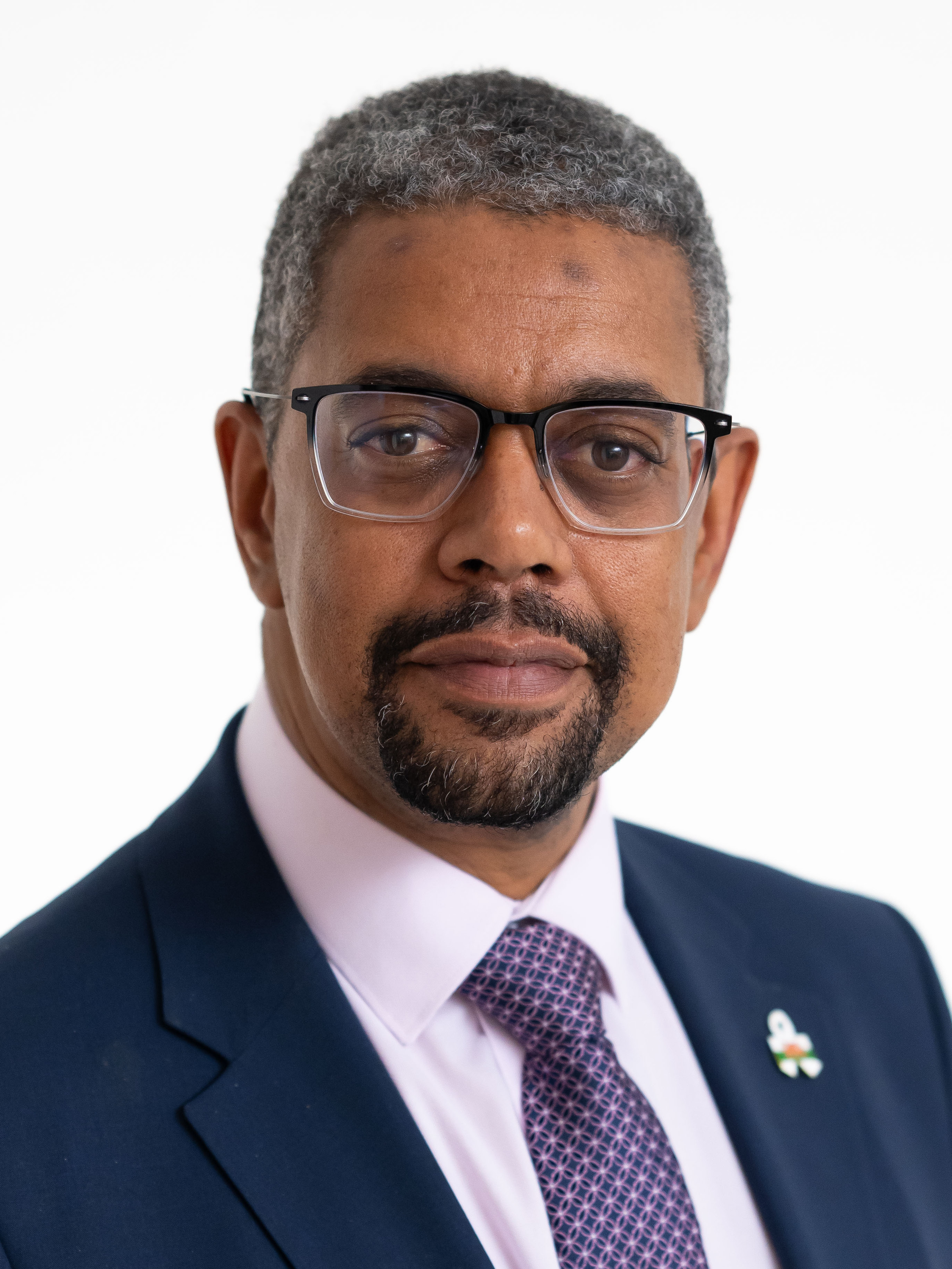
Vaughan Gething, the former First Minister of Wales, the first Black leader of any European country

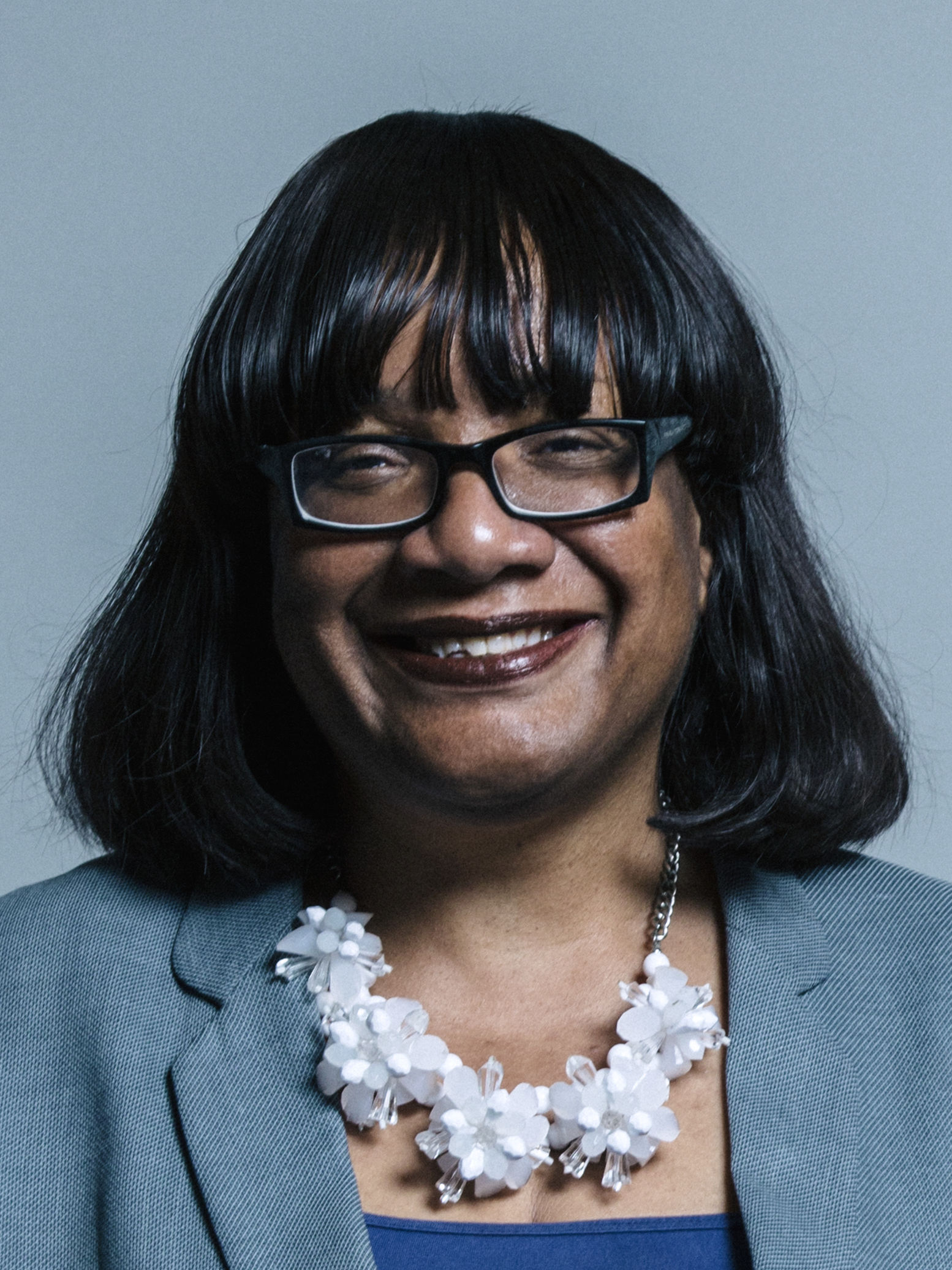
Diane Abbott, the current Mother of the House, the first Black woman elected to parliament and longest-serving black MP

People of Black African and Caribbean ancestry such as Bernie Grant, Valerie Amos, David Lammy, Dawn Butler, Sir Mark Hendrick and Diane Abbott, as well as Oona King, and Paul Boateng, who are bi-racial, have made significant contributions to British politics and trade unionism. Boateng became the United Kingdom's first biracial cabinet minister in 2002 when he was appointed as Chief Secretary to the Treasury. Abbott became the first Black female Member of Parliament when she was elected to the House of Commons in the 1987 general election.

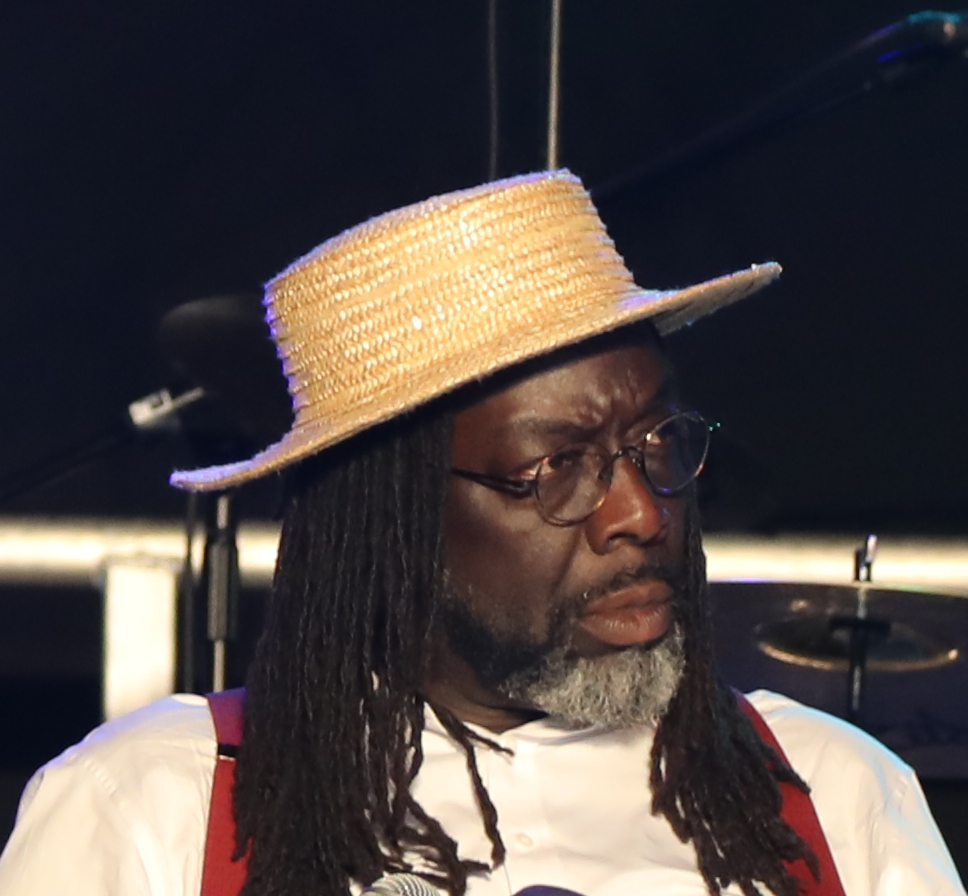
A prominent social care charity administrator, Lord Adebowale is currently a Crossbench member of the House of Lords.

Bill Morris, was elected general secretary of the Transport and General Workers' Union in 1992 and became the first Black leader of a major British trade union. He was knighted in 2003, and in 2006 he took a seat in the House of Lords as a working life peer, Baron Morris of Handsworth.

The Trinidadian cricketer Learie Constantine, was ennobled in 1969 and took the title Baron Constantine of Maraval in Trinidad and Nelson in the County Palatine of Lancaster.

David Pitt, Baron Pitt of Hampstead, became a member of the House of Lords when he became a life peer for the Labour Party in 1975. He was also president of the British Medical Association. The first Black Conservative Peer was John Taylor, Baron Taylor of Warwick. Valerie Amos became the first Black woman cabinet minister and the first Black woman to become leader of the House of Lords. Patricia Scotland, became a Labour life peer in 1997 and became the first female secretary-general of the Commonwealth of Nations.

In 2025, Margaret Obi was appointed to the High Court as the most senior black British judge.

=== Television ===
Jamaican-born Barbara Blake-Hannah was the first Black person to be an on-camera reporter and interviewer on British television in 1968. Television reporter and newsreader Sir Trevor McDonald, born in Trinidad, was knighted in 1999. Pogus Caesar producing and directing multicultural series for Central Television, Carlton Television and BBC. Also notable is Moira Stuart, OBE, the first female newsreader of African-Caribbean heritage on British television. Clive Myrie, of Jamaican heritage, is another notable newsreader and reporter. He is also the host of the long-running BBC quiz shows Mastermind and Celebrity Mastermind. Other high-profile television personalities and entertainers include comedian Sir Lenny Henry, Rudolph Walker, Joseph Marcell, Nabil Elouahabi and chef Ainsley Harriott.

=== Singers ===
Marsha Ambrosius, Joan Armatrading, Pato Banton, Dame Shirley Bassey, Mel B, Alexandra Burke, Celeste, Diane Charlemagne, Taio Cruz, Craig David, Des'ree, Fleur East, Estelle, Gabrielle, Roland Gift, Jaki Graham, David Grant, Eddy Grant, Pauline Henry, Dev Hynes, Jamelia, KSI, Leona Lewis, Lianne La Havas, Shaznay Lewis, Mahalia, Ella Mai, MNEK, Maxine Nightingale, Billy Ocean, Mica Paris, Leigh-Anne Pinnock, Maxi Priest, Corinne Bailey Rae, Andrew Roachford, Sade, Emeli Sande, Seal, Skepta, Heather Small, Jorja Smith, 21 Savage, Digga D, Benji Webbe, Simon Webbe, Caron Wheeler, Dave and Young MC are among the popular singers not mentioned in the music section above.

=== Film ===
Sir Horace Ové was the first Black British filmmaker to direct a feature-length film, Pressure, in 1976. Considered a pioneer in Black British filmmaking, Ové was awarded a knighthood for his services to media. Inspired by Ové, Menelik Shabazz became the second Black filmmaker to direct a feature film in the UK, Burning an Illusion, in 1981. The film received critical acclaim and is considered an important landmark in UK cinema. Burning an Illusion won the Grand Prix at the Amiens International Film Festival in France.

The most prominent Black British filmmaker is Sir Steve McQueen, who after initially receiving acclaim as a visual artist and winning the Turner Prize in 1999, went on to direct his first feature Hunger (2008), which earned him the Caméra d'Or at the 2008 Cannes Film Festival. His third feature film, 12 Years a Slave (2013), won several major international awards, and McQueen became the first Black filmmaker to win an Academy Award for Best Picture. Other notable Black British filmmakers include Richard Ayoade, Amma Asante, debbie tucker green, Ngozi Onwurah, and Destiny Ekaragha.

=== Actors ===
Numerous Black British actors have experienced success in US television, such as Adewale Akinnuoye-Agbaje, Sir Idris Elba, Alfred Enoch, Damson Idris, Lennie James, Marianne Jean-Baptiste, Regé-Jean Page, and Marsha Thomason. Black British actors are also increasingly found starring in major Hollywood films, notable examples include Kingsley Ben-Adir, John Boyega, Franz Drameh, Chiwetel Ejiofor, Cynthia Erivo, David Harewood, Naomie Harris, Paterson Joseph, Daniel Kaluuya, Adrian Lester, Delroy Lindo, Lashana Lynch, Gugu Mbatha-Raw, Thandiwe Newton, Sophie Okonedo, Eunice Olumide, David Oyelowo, Aaron Pierre, Hugh Quarshie, Maisie Richardson-Sellers, Colin Salmon, Kobna Holdbrook-Smith, Antonia Thomas, Eamonn Walker, Ashley Walters, and Letitia Wright. Looking to join the listed above are young stars such as Ricardo P. Lloyd who spoke about the challenges many Black British actors face in the UK industry compared to the US in an article by The Independent.

=== Visual artists ===
Among notable Black British visual artists are painters such as Chris Ofili, Frank Bowling, Lynette Yiadom-Boakye, Keith Piper, Sonia Boyce, Paul Dash, Kimathi Donkor, Claudette Johnson, Winston Branch, Lina Iris Viktor Pogus Caesar; sculptors including Sokari Douglas Camp, Ronald Moody, Fowokan, Yinka Shonibare, Hew Locke and Zak Ové; designers including Yinka Ilori, Samuel Ross, Mac Collins, and the architect Sir David Adjaye.

=== Fashion ===
Naomi Campbell was the first Black model to appear on the front cover of Time, French Vogue, and the September issue of American Vogue. Other notable models include Leomie Anderson, Jourdan Dunn, Paloma Elsesser and Munroe Bergdorf.

=== Writers ===
Britain's first major Black newspaper, the West Indian Gazette (WIG), was founded by communist activist Claudia Jones in 1958. Notable Black British writers include Andrea Levy, whose best selling book, Small Island (2004), won the Whitbread Book of the Year, the Orange Prize for Fiction and the Commonwealth Writers' Prize. Levy became the first Black writer whose pen would join the Royal Society of Literature's historic collection, which includes pens belonging to Charles Dickens, George Eliot, T. S. Eliot and Lord Byron. Bernardine Evaristo's novel Girl, Woman, Other won the Man Booker Prize in 2019, making Evaristo the first Black British writer to win the Man Booker. In 2020, Evaristo was made an Officer of the Order of the British Empire for her services to literature. Zadie Smith won the Anisfield-Wolf Book Award, the Commonwealth Writers' Best Book Award (Eurasia Section) and the Orange Prize for On Beauty. Smith's acclaimed first novel, White Teeth (2000) was an international best seller and won multiple accolades, including the James Tait Black Memorial Prize for fiction, the Whitbread Book Award in category best first novel, the Guardian First Book Award and the Betty Trask Award. Time magazine included the novel in its list of the 100 best English-language novels from 1923 to 2005. Dreda Say Mitchell became the first Black British writer to be awarded the Crime Writers Association's John Creasey Dagger for her debut book Running Hot, in 2005. Mitchell's 2019 psychological thriller, Spare Room, became a critically acclaimed international best seller and she was honoured with an MBE for services to literature. At the 2020 British Book Awards, Candice Carty-Williams became the first Black woman to win the "Book of the Year" accolade, for her novel Queenie. Queenie entered the Sunday Times Bestseller hardback chart at number two and has gone on to win numerous accolades. Other notable novelists include Caryl Phillips, Victor Headley, Alex Wheatle, Ferdinand Dennis (winner of the Martin Luther King Memorial Prize for his 1988 travelogue Behind the Frontlines: Journey into Afro-Britain), George Lamming, Samuel Selvon (who wrote the groundbreaking novel The Lonely Londoners), Andrew Salkey, Sir Wilson Harris (who was knighted and received a Lifetime Achievement Prize from the Anisfield-Wolf Book Awards), Mike Phillips, Booker Prize nominee Nadifa Mohamed and Diran Adebayo (first winner in 1995 of the Saga Prize, which was set up by Marsha Hunt to encourage Black British writing and ran for four years).

Jackie Kay was Scots Makar, the national poet laureate of Scotland, between 2016 and 2021. Other notable poets include Roger Robinson (won the prestigious T. S. Eliot Prize 2019), Benjamin Zephaniah, Linton Kwesi Johnson, Lemn Sissay, Salena Godden, Warsan Shire, Patience Agbabi, Kamau Brathwaite (won the 2006 International Griffin Poetry Prize, for his volume of poetry Born to Slow Horses) and James Berry, who was made an Officer of the Order of the British Empire for services to poetry. Notable playwrights include Mustapha Matura, Kwame Kwei-Armah, Roy Williams, Winsome Pinnock, Patricia Cumper and Bola Agbaje. Other contributors include journalists such as Reni Eddo-Lodge, Gary Younge, Afua Hirsch, Ekow Eshun, and Children's Laureate Dame Malorie Blackman. Onyeka Nubia is the author of fictional trilogy Waiting to Explode, The Black Prince, and The Phoenix, for which he won the 2009 African Achievers award for Communication and Media. Blackamoores: Africans in Tudor England, their Presence, Status and Origins is his latest book, published by Narrative Eye in 2013, in which he proves that Black people in Tudor England had free status and were not slaves. Blackamoores was runner-up in the 2013/14 People's Book Prize.

=== Police service ===
Norwell Roberts was one of the first Black police officers to join the Metropolitan Police in 1967, eventually rising to the rank of Detective Sergeant. Roberts was awarded the Queen's Police Medal for distinguished service in 1996 and retired from duty in 1997. Michael Fuller, after a career in the Metropolitan Police, served as the Chief Constable of Kent from 2004 to 2010. He is the son of Jamaican immigrants who came to the United Kingdom in the 1950s. Fuller was brought up in Sussex, where his interest in the police force was encouraged by an officer attached to his school. He is a graduate in social psychology. Leroy Logan served as a Metropolitan Police superintendent and was a founding member and chairman of the National Black Police Association. Logan was awarded an MBE for his fight against racism within the police force. Janet Hills was the first woman to chair the National Black Police Association and was awarded an MBE for her services to policing and to community relations.

=== Military services ===
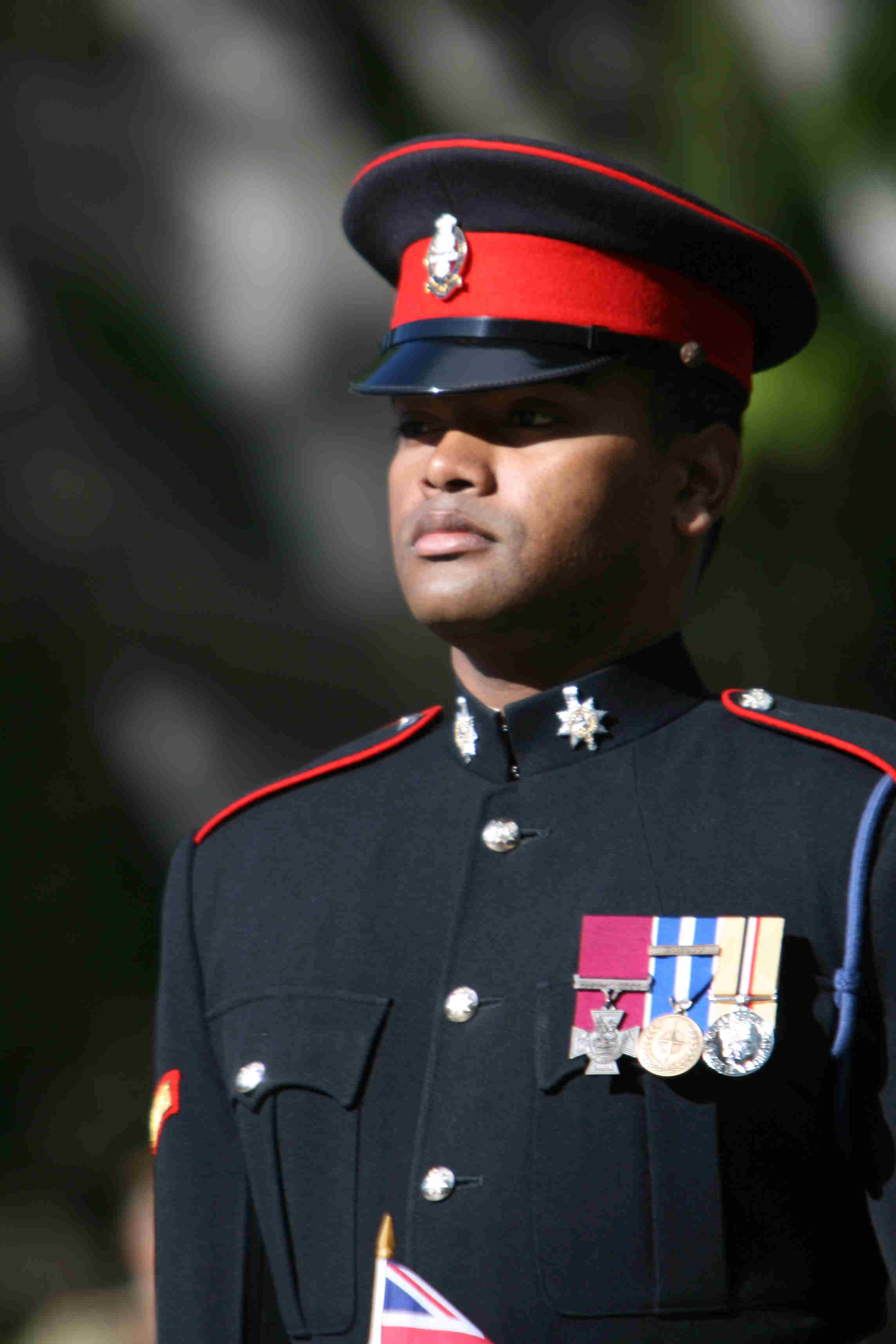
Johnson Beharry, VC.

British communist activist Charlie Hutchison, born in Witney and raised in an orphanage, was the only Black British volunteer to join the British Battalion of the International Brigades during the Spanish Civil War. He spent almost 10 years uninterruptedly fighting fascists, taking part in the Battle of Cable Street, and fighting in numerous battles including the Dunkirk evacuation, and the liberation of Bergen-Belsen concentration camp.

In 2005, soldier Johnson Beharry, born in Grenada, became the first man to win the Victoria Cross, the United Kingdom's foremost military award for bravery, since the Falklands War of 1982. He was awarded the medal for service in Iraq in 2004. Air Commodore David Case is the highest ranking black officer in the forces. He joined the RAF as a 19-year-old cadet to read aeronautical engineering at the Queen's University Belfast. He received his commission in 1975 and was awarded the distinguished Sword of Honour, which is bestowed upon the top cadet officer of the year.

=== Sport ===
In the sport of boxing, there have been multiple Black British world champions, including Lennox Lewis (three-time heavyweight world champion, two-time lineal champion, the most recent heavyweight to hold the undisputed championship, and widely viewed as one of the greatest boxers of all-time), Frank Bruno, Chris Eubank Sr., Nigel Benn, David Haye, Kell Brook, James DeGale, Anthony Joshua and Lawrence Okolie.

Benjamin Odeje became the first Black player to represent England at any level when he played for the England schoolboys team in 1971. There are many notable Black British footballers, some of whom have played for England, including Reece James, Tammy Abraham, Fikayo Tomori, Marcus Rashford, Paul Ince, Sol Campbell, John Barnes, Dion Dublin, Rio Ferdinand, Viv Anderson, Des Walker, Ashley Cole, Ian Wright, Daniel Sturridge, Daniel Welbeck, Joe Gomez, Micah Richards, Bukayo Saka, Raheem Sterling, Jesse Lingard, Trent Alexander-Arnold, Jude Bellingham, Danny Rose, Ryan Bertrand, Kyle Walker, Dele Alli and David James. Andrew Watson who is widely considered to be the world's first association footballer of Black heritage, Chris Iwelumo and Ikechi Anya among others have all played for Scotland. Eddie Parris, Danny Gabbidon, Nathan Blake and Ashley Williams have played for Wales.

Black British people have performed well in track and field. Daley Thompson was the gold medallist for the Great Britain team in the decathlon in the 1980 and 1984 Olympics. The most decorated British athlete is Jamaica-born Linford Christie, who moved to the United Kingdom at age seven. He was winner of the gold medal in the 100 meters at the 1992 Olympics, the World Championships, the European Championships and the Commonwealth Games. Sprinter Dwain Chambers grew up in London. His early achievements winning a world junior record for the 100 meters in 1997, as the youngest medal winner in the 1999 world championships, and fourth place at the 2000 Olympics were marred by a later scandal over the use of performance-enhancing drugs, like Christie before him. Kelly Holmes won Olympic gold in both the 800m and 1500m, and set many British records. Mo Farah, his ten global championship gold medals (four Olympic and six World titles) make him the most successful male track distance runner ever, and he is the most successful British track athlete in modern Olympic Games history.

In cricket, many have represented England: Mark Alleyne, Jofra Archer, Mark Butcher, Michael Carberry, Norman Cowans, Phillip DeFreitas, Dean Headley, Chris Jordan, David Lawrence, Chris Lewis, Devon Malcolm, Gladstone Small, and Alex Tudor to name a few.

In Formula 1, the highest rank of motorsport sanctioned by the FIA, Sir Lewis Hamilton from Stevenage is a seven-time champion, having won the championship in 2008, 2014, 2015, 2017, 2018, 2019 and 2020. With seven titles, more than 100 wins and pole positions, he is the most successful driver in the sport's history.

=== Business ===
Dyke, Dryden and Wade created Britain's first Black multi-million-pound business and laid the foundations for future UK black enterprise.

Sir Damon Buffini heads Permira, one of the world's largest private equity firms. He topped the 2007 Powerlist as the most powerful Black male in the United Kingdom by New Nation magazine and was appointed to then Prime Minister Gordon Brown's business advisory panel.

Ismail Ahmed, is the founder and chairman of WorldRemit, a money transfer company, and Director of the Sahan Foundation International. In October 2019, Ahmed was named first in the Powerlist 2020, an annual list of the 100 most powerful people of African heritage in the UK.

René Carayol is a broadcaster, broadsheet columnist, business and leadership speaker and author, best known for presenting the BBC series Did They Pay Off Their Mortgage in Two Years? He has also served as an executive main board director for blue-chip companies as well as the public sector.

Wol Kolade is council member and Chairman of the BVCA (British Venture Capital Association) and a Governor and council member of the London School of Economics and Political Science, chairing its Audit Committee.

Adam Afriyie is a politician, and Conservative Member of Parliament for Windsor. He is also the founding director of Connect Support Services, an IT services company pioneering fixed-price support. He was also Chairman of DeHavilland Information Services plc, a news and information services company, and was a regional finalist in the 2003 Ernst and Young Entrepreneur of the Year awards.

Wilfred Emmanuel-Jones is a businessman, farmer and founder of the popular Black Farmer range of food products, which has annual revenues of more than £7m.

Following its success in 2007 on TV show Dragons' Den, the Levi Roots brand has grown into a multi-million-pound enterprise.

Dame Pat McGrath, who has been described as the most influential make-up artist in the world by Vogue magazine, owns a business with an estimated value of $1 billion.

Mo Ibrahim is a telecommunications billionaire businessman and was listed by TIME magazine as one of the 100 most influential people in the world.

Strive Masiyiwa is a billionaire businessman and founder and executive chairman of the international technology group Econet Global. He became the first Black billionaire to enter the Sunday Times Rich List in 2021.

Jacky Wright is chief digital officer and a corporate vice president at Microsoft US. She has been named the most influential Black person in the UK, ranking at the top of the annual Powerlist in 2022.

Dame Sharon White, the first ever female chair of John Lewis Partnership, she topped the 2023 Powerlist.

In 2004, Greater London Authority Economics produced a report to examine the economic contribution Black [owned] businesses made to London's economy. The report found that Black businesses made up 4% of all London's businesses, provided more than 70,000 jobs and had a total turnover of almost £4.5 billion.

Businesses owned by Black Britons generate more than £10bn for the UK each year, according to the Centre for Research in Ethnic Minority Entrepreneurship (CREME).

== See also ==
- Black and Asian Studies Association
- Black Cultural Archives
- Black Scottish people
- Black Welsh people
- Ethnic groups in the United Kingdom
- London Black Revolutionaries
- Racism in the United Kingdom#Black
