= Aggrey Burke =

British psychiatrist and academic (1943–2025)

Aggrey Burke FRCPsych
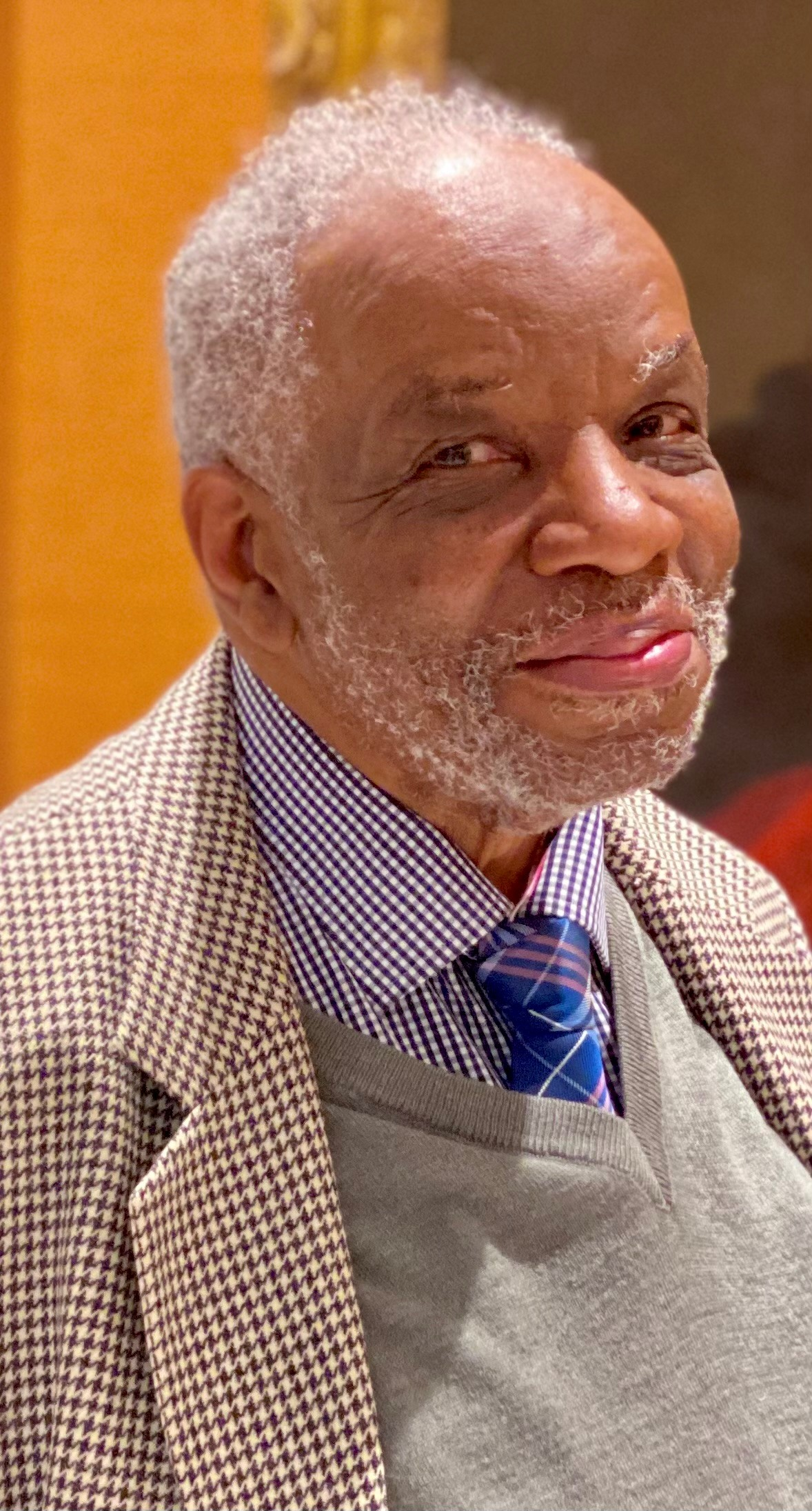
- Burke, Osler Club of London, Royal College of Physicians, London (2022)
- Born: Aggrey Washington Burke; 13 May 1943; Saint Elizabeth, Jamaica
- Died: 21 December 2025 (aged 82); London, England
- Education: University of Birmingham; University of the West Indies
- Occupation: Psychiatrist
- Known for: Psychotherapeutic work with bereaved families following the fire at a house in New Cross (1981); Medical School Admissions report (1988)
- Relatives: Syd Burke (brother)
- Medical career
- Profession: Physician
- Field: Transcultural psychiatry
- Institutions: University Hospital; St George's Hospital
- Sub-specialties: Transcultural psychiatry
- Research: Repatriation; Attempted suicide; Racism and mental illness
- Notable works: "Racial and Sexual Discrimination in the Selection of Students for London Medical Schools" (1986)

Aggrey Washington Burke FRCPsych (13 May 1943 – 21 December 2025) was a Jamaican-born British psychiatrist and academic, who spent the majority of his medical career at St George's Hospital in London, England, specialising in transcultural psychiatry and writing literature on changing attitudes towards black people and mental health. He carried out extensive research on racism and mental illness and was the first black consultant psychiatrist appointed by Britain's National Health Service (NHS).

During his early career, Burke conducted studies on the mental health of repatriates at Bellevue Hospital, Jamaica, and concluded that repatriation caused significant psychological harm. While in Jamaica, he authored the earliest epidemiological report on schizophrenia in the Caribbean. In 1976, having returned to the UK, Burke published works on attempted suicide in immigrant Irish, West Indian and Asian people in Birmingham. In the early 1980s, he carried out psychotherapeutic work with bereaved families following the fire at a house in New Cross in which 13 young black people died.

Burke's work throughout the 1980s demonstrated how deprivation is associated with mental illness in some black communities, and revealed prejudices that affect mental health care in these groups. He questioned the significant number in some locked secure hospital wards of young black males, many of whom he said require treatment rather than restraint, and he looked at the role of the families of black and Asian people with mental illness. He later gave evidence in the early 1990s inquiry into the death of Orville Blackwood at Broadmoor Hospital.

In 1986, together with Joe Collier, Burke wrote a "groundbreaking" paper for the journal Medical Education, which concluded that "racial and sexual discrimination operate when students are selected for medical education at London colleges". It was followed by an enquiry by the Commission for Racial Equality (CRE) and the publication of its report in 1988, which led to changes in admissions processes.

== Early life and education ==
Aggrey Burke was born on 13 May 1943 in Saint Elizabeth, Jamaica, where he received his early education. His grandmother was Emily Watts, who ran a kindergarten, and his parents were Revd Edmund (Eddie) Newton Burke and Isolene Theodora Pansy (née Balfour). Aggrey was one of six siblings, the eldest being Syd Burke, who became a renowned photographer and journalist. After attending four different primary schools, he gained a scholarship to Jamaica College, Kingston.

In 1959, while still a teenager, Burke moved to Britain with his parents, who had migrated there with three of their sons. His father Eddie, a senior civil servant, had been seconded to England to ease community tensions in the aftermath of the 1958 Notting Hill race riots. The family settled in Kew, west London, where Burke was schooled at Shene County Grammar School and, as the only black child in his class, experienced feelings of isolation. Subsequently, he gained admission to study medicine in 1962 at the University of Birmingham, one of a very few Caribbean students, where he was captain of athletics, and from where he graduated in 1968.

== Early career ==
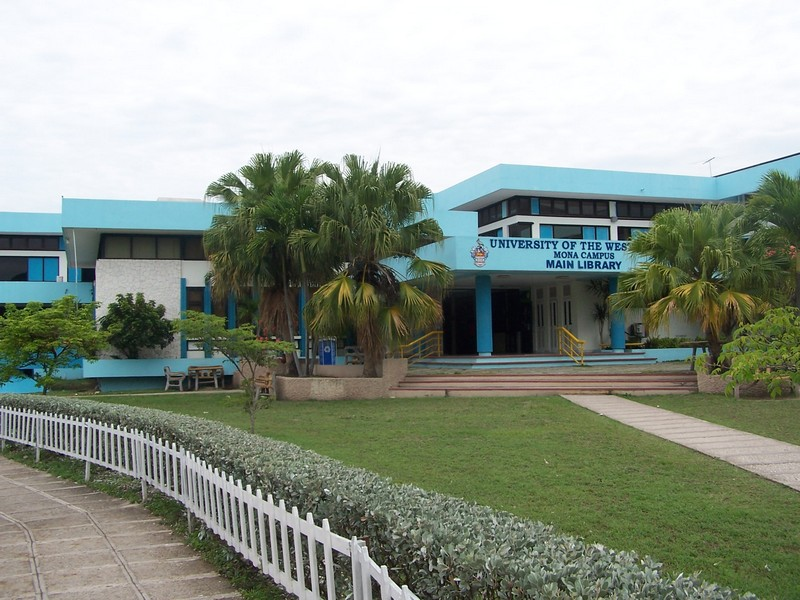
University of the West Indies; Mona Campus

Having graduated from Birmingham University, Burke went on to the University of the West Indies, returning to Jamaica in 1968 to complete his early clinical training. That year, the political activist and academic Walter Rodney noted in his memoirs, that Burke was posted at the University Hospital, Mona, Jamaica. After one year, he moved to Port of Spain, Trinidad and Tobago, as part of a psychiatry training programme. In 1971, he was noted to be back at the University Hospital in Mona as a registrar and elected member of the Psychotherapy and Social Psychiatry Section.

During his time in Jamaica, Burke conducted studies on the mental health of repatriates at the psychiatric hospital Bellevue Hospital, noting that a significant number of admissions were repatriates from England. He reported that 20 per cent had been sent from the high-security psychiatric unit Broadmoor Hospital, the majority had not wished to return to Jamaica and most were diagnosed with paranoia, despite Burke noting that they lacked any delusions with regards to discrimination based on skin colour. He described the stigma of failed migration and the "feelings of persecution and negative behaviours" associated with repatriation as a specific psychological event, and as a result coined the term "repatriate syndrome". Burke calculated that one in four would die, and concluded that repatriation was a "gross social insult", caused significant psychological harm and had no therapeutic benefit. He wrote about suicide in Trinidad and authored the earliest epidemiological report on schizophrenia in the Caribbean. One study by Burke looked at venereal disease at the Bellevue Hospital, with particular concern for those people with previous inadequate treatment with penicillin.

== Psychiatry and mental health in the UK ==
In 1976, having returned to the UK to complete his psychotherapy and psychiatry training as a research fellow in the Department of Psychiatry at the University of Birmingham, he wrote a series of papers on attempted suicide in immigrant Irish, West Indian and Asian people in Birmingham, comparing the rates to the local population and to that in the countries of origin of these groups. Subsequently, he presented his findings at the 6th World Congress of Social Psychiatry. In 1977, he was appointed senior lecturer in psychiatry at St George's Medical School in Tooting, London. He later became the first black British person to be appointed by the NHS as a consultant psychiatrist. In 1985, he was noted to be Britain's only "leading" black psychiatrist. By 1988, there were two Caribbean psychiatrists in the NHS. He was a Fellow of the Royal College of Psychiatrists.

Burke's work included writing on changing attitudes towards black people and mental health, research on the role of racial discrimination in psychiatric disorders, and how racism can lead to mental illness. At an oral history seminar in 1981, organised by Lambeth Community Relations Council, Burke stated: "If you are black, and working class, there are much greater chances of being compulsorily admitted to hospital under a section of the Mental Health Act, going to a special hospital and sometimes being repatriated." In April of that year, following the Brixton riots, he co-founded "The Ethnic Study Group", which dismissed diagnoses of "Balham psychosis, New Cross psychosis, West Indian psychosis and Migration psychosis".

His work showed how deprivation is associated with mental illness in some black communities, and revealed prejudices that affect mental health care in these groups. Later, he addressed the notion that psychiatric reports for courts show an "obsession with blacks being bad, big blacks somewhat worse, and big black males – particularly those that have had any contact with the police – as the most dangerous of all cases". He simultaneously questioned the significant number of young black males in some locked secure hospital wards, a number who he said require treatment rather than restraint, stating in one interview that "this is partly due to seeing blacks as dangerous. There is this mind-set that the black population is tricky, difficult to deal with. The Government has not attempted to understand the root issues which are poverty and deprivation."

In the early 1980s, Burke carried out psychotherapeutic work with bereaved families following the January 1981 New Cross house fire that killed 13 young black people on 18 January 1981, with one survivor committing suicide two years later. Burke also looked at the role of families of black and Asian people with mental illness, and advocated the importance of treatment within a family context. When treating West Indian people with mental illness, he used his familiarity with key Jamaican role models including Marcus Garvey, Bob Marley and the Rastafarian movement. In one study concerning Black people in Birmingham, he reported a 100 per cent response rate once they were made aware that the research team were also black. He wrote on the limitations of one-to-one counselling in Afro-Caribbean people with mental illness when a significant contributory factor to their condition was family stress, and that a positive outcome was strongly influenced by the family-patient interaction.

His 1984 study of West Indians in Aston, Birmingham, showed they experienced a high percentage of psychosomatic symptoms and an underdiagnosis of depression. In the same year, he demonstrated that African Americans who experienced racism also reported feelings of "intrusion and avoidance". In the 1980s, he coined the terms "under-reaction" and "over-reaction" to illustrate how services respond to some ethnic groups.

== Medical school admissions ==
In 1986, together with clinical pharmacologist Joe Collier, when both were senior lecturers at St George's, Burke wrote a "groundbreaking" paper for the journal Medical Education, entitled "Racial and sexual discrimination in the selection of students for London medical schools". After examining the female to male ratio and the names of students taking final examinations at 11 London medical schools, they concluded that "the results of this survey suggest that racial and sexual discrimination operate when students are selected for medical education at London colleges".

The Commission for Racial Equality (CRE) was subsequently made aware that software used for medical-school admissions selection at St George's was creating a lower score for women and those with non-European names, so reducing their chance of being called for interview. Following an enquiry, the official CRE report (1988) confirmed Burke and Collier's findings and also questioned what might be happening in other London medical schools; St. George's already had a higher than average intake of students with non-European names. As a result of their work, both Burke and Collier were initially shunned within their institution, but changes were subsequently made to admissions policies.

== 1990s Prins inquiry ==
Burke gave evidence in the Herschel Prins-led inquiry into the death of Orville Blackwood at Broadmoor Hospital, published in 1994. In the Prins Inquiry, Burke suggested that Orville Blackwood "was a man with profound insight" and termed his illness as "acute stress-related psychotic disorder".

== Later life ==
Unlike others of his experience, Burke never received a professorship. He remained at St George's until his retirement, following which he continued with work in psychiatry, writing on black mental health issues and assisting the General Medical Council. In 1994, he gave the Martin Luther King Memorial Lecture entitled "In Search of Freedom".

In February 2010, Burke was the keynote speaker at the 5th Annual Huntley Conference, which was on the theme "Young, Black and British: Identity and Community through the generations" and was held at London Metropolitan Archives, where he explained how the supplementary school movement gave new immigrants a sense of being Caribbean.

In April 2016, Burke looked back at some of his own work at a public meeting at London's Learie Constantine Centre (sponsored by Brent Patient Voice and Brent MIND) on the topic "Race and Mental Health: are black communities getting a fair deal?" and, in the context of race, ethnicity, class and trauma, reflected on the statistics that show that young black men may be five times more likely than young men from other groups to be diagnosed with severe schizophrenia. In light of his figures on the wide differences between the various Caribbean islanders, collectively referred to as Afro-Caribbean, he questioned this categorisation.

== Other roles, awards and honours ==
Burke's other roles have included being the president of the Transcultural Psychiatry Society (TCPS), which focused on issues of culture and race in British mental health services. The society expanded under his leadership and that of Suman Fernando. In 1984, Burke chaired a symposium organised by the TCPS on the theme "Mental Health and Apartheid".

He was also appointed the vice-chair and a trustee of the George Padmore Institute, an archive, educational, research and information centre that was founded in 1991 by John La Rose together with a group of political and cultural activists connected to New Beacon Books. Burke became an active member of the International Association for Suicide Prevention and taught on suicide awareness programmes.

In October 2019, Burke was one of three psychiatrists to appear on a Royal College of Psychiatrists poster for Black History Month. In 2020, he was named in the list of 100 Great Black Britons. In the same year, he was one of the seven recipients of the President's Medal from the Royal College of Psychiatrists, awarded at a virtual ceremony in November 2020.

On 6 April 2022, Burke delivered the annual Lord Pitt Memorial Lecture, organised by the British Caribbean Association and held at the UCL Institute of Education. In July 2022, St George's awarded Burke an honorary degree of Doctor of Science, for his work "as a pioneering campaigner against discrimination" as well as for his contribution to the field of psychiatry.

In 2023, he received The Weekly Gleaner Honour Award Certificate for Health and Wellness "for his years of extensive research on racism and mental illness".

In 2024, Burke was awarded the honorary degree Doctor of Medicine from the University of Birmingham.

== Personal life ==
Burke's eldest brother was the pioneering photographer, broadcaster and journalist Syd Burke (1938–2010). Their father Revd Eddie Burke, who died on 3 July 2000 at the age of 91, was described in the Newsletter of the George Padmore Institute as "a leading figure in the modern history of Jamaica".

== Death and legacy ==
Burke died on 21 December 2025, at the age of 82. Named in his honour, the Aggrey Burke Fellowship was launched in 2023 by the Royal College of Psychiatrists as part of their Equality Action Plan "to encourage and support Black medical students to pursue a career in psychiatry". Patrick Vernon wrote in a tribute: "Aggrey was part of a generation that came to Britain with qualifications, optimism, and a deep commitment to public service, only to encounter institutions shaped by colonial thinking and structural racism. As one of the first black consultant psychiatrists in the NHS, he did not simply seek to survive within the system, he challenged it, relentlessly and courageously."

== Selected publications ==
=== Articles ===
- Burke, A. W. (1972). "Syphilis in a Jamaican psychiatric hospital; A review of 52 cases including 17 of neurosyphilis". British Journal of Venereal Diseases. 48 (4): 249–253. doi:10.1136/sti.48.4.249. PMC 1048317. PMID 5083439.
- Burke, A. W. (1973). "The Consequences of Unplanned Repatriation". British Journal of Psychiatry. 123 (572): 109–11. doi:10.1192/bjp.123.1.109. PMID 4729867. S2CID 28450019.
- Burke, Aggrey W. (June 1976). "Attempted Suicide Among the Irish-Born Population in Birmingham". British Journal of Psychiatry. 128 (6): 534–537. doi:10.1192/bjp.128.6.534. ISSN 0007-1250. PMID 1276562. S2CID 36176584.
- Burke, Aggrey W. (June 1976). "Attempted Suicide Among Asian Immigrants in Birmingham". British Journal of Psychiatry. 128 (6): 528–533. doi:10.1192/bjp.128.6.528. ISSN 0007-1250. PMID 1276561. S2CID 36553536.
- Burke, Aggrey W. (September 1976). "Socio-Cultural Determinants of Attempted Suicide Among West Indians in Birmingham: Ethnic Origin and Immigrant Status". British Journal of Psychiatry. 129 (3): 261–266. doi:10.1192/bjp.129.3.261. ISSN 0007-1250. PMID 963363. S2CID 35150451.
- Burke, A.W. (June 1980). "A Cross Cultural Study of Delinquency Among West Indian Boys". International Journal of Social Psychiatry. 26 (2): 81–87. doi:10.1177/002076408002600202. ISSN 0020-7640. PMID 7399838. S2CID 33939057.
- Burke, A.W. (1982). "Epidemiological Aspects of the Repatriate Syndrome". International Journal of Social Psychiatry. 28 (4): 291–299. doi:10.1177/002076408202800408. ISSN 0020-7640. PMID 7152853. S2CID 29564756.
- Burke, A.W. (April 1983). "Outcome of Mental Illness Following Repatriation: a Predictive Study". International Journal of Social Psychiatry. 29 (1): 3–11. doi:10.1177/002076408302900101. ISSN 0020-7640. PMID 6840989. S2CID 34794321.
- Burke, A. W. (1 March 1984). "Is Racism a Causatory Factor in Mental Illness?: An Introduction". International Journal of Social Psychiatry. 30 (1–2): 1–3. doi:10.1177/002076408403000101. ISSN 0020-7640. PMID 6706482. S2CID 9033053.
- Burke, Aggrey W. (1 March 1984). "Racism and Psychological Disturbance Among West Indians in Britain". International Journal of Social Psychiatry. 30 (1–2): 50–68. doi:10.1177/002076408403000108. ISSN 0020-7640. PMID 6706495. S2CID 2620015.
- Co-authored with Collier, J. (March 1986). "Racial and sexual discrimination in the selection of students for London medical schools". Medical Education. 20 (2): 86–90. doi:10.1111/j.1365-2923.1986.tb01052.x. PMID 3959932. S2CID 29456272.
- "Managing dangerous people with severe personality disorder: the race dimension" (PDF). Criminal Justice Matters (37). Autumn 1999.
- "The extent of conflict between being black and being British". Criminal Justice Matters (101: #BlackLivesMatter). Centre for Crime and Justice Studies. 29 September 2015.

=== Book chapters ===
- Cox, John L., ed. (1986). "9. Prejudice and Mental Illness". Transcultural Psychiatry. doi:10.4324/9780429447464-9. S2CID 150127422.
- Coombe, Vivienne; Alan Little, eds. (1992). "Social Work and Intervention in West Indian Psychiatric Disorder". Race and Social Work: A Guide to Training. Routledge. ISBN 0-415-09093-8.
- Cruickshank, J. K.; D. G. Beevers, eds. (1989). "Psychiatric practice and ethnic minorities". Ethnic Factors in Health and Disease. Butterworth-Heinemann. pp. 178–189. doi:10.1016/B978-0-7236-0916-2.50028-9. ISBN 978-0-7236-0916-2.
- Harris, Roxy; Sarah White, eds. (2009). Building Britannia: Life Experience with Britain. New Beacon Books. ISBN 9781873201169. Archived from the original on 2 July 2020. (Joint author with Dennis Bovell, Althea McNish, Gus John, Wilfred Wood, Yvonne Brewster, Alexis Rennie)
