= Waveney Bushell =

Guyanese teacher, activist and educational psychologist (born 1928)

- Born: 1928 (age 97–98); Buxton, Demerara, British Guiana
- Education: Bedford College, London
- Occupations: Teacher, activist and educational psychologist

Waveney Bushell (born 1928) is a Guyanese-born teacher, activist and "arguably the first Black educational psychologist in the UK". She is most notable for her role in exposing racism and inequality in the British educational system.

== Early life ==
Waveney Bushell was born in 1928 in Buxton, Demerara, British Guiana. Her mother died when she was six and she was brought up by her aunt.

Bushell trained as a teacher after leaving school. In the 1950s, she travelled to Britain to teach, after applying for teaching work through the London County Council.

== Training and early career ==
While working as a teacher in London, Bushell trained and then qualified as an educational psychologist, earning a psychology degree from Bedford College, London, before earning a postgraduate qualification in educational psychology from the Child Guidance Training Centre (the sister school to the Tavistock Clinic). Bushell was "the first black female psychologist to be admitted to the Child Guidance Training Centre" and graduated in 1965. From 1965 to 1967, she worked as an educational psychologist for Surrey local education authority. In 1967, she began work for the School Psychological Services in Croydon, where she stayed for the next twenty two years.

== Criticism of intelligence tests ==
As a psychologist in Croydon, Bushell found it odd that large numbers of Black children were being classified as "educationally subnormal" and then sent to Educationally Subnormal (ESN) schools. Bushell argued that the IQ tests given – such as the Stanford-Binet and Wechsler Adult Intelligence Scale tests – were not fair assessments as they were built upon European cultural specificities. As such, the tests "were stacked against Black Caribbean children".

== Caribbean Education and Community Workers Association ==
Along with fellow campaigners such as Jessica Huntley and John La Rose, Bushell was a founding member of the Caribbean Education and Community Workers Association (CECWA). Bushell was also the first Chair of CECWA.

CECWA became "the initiating and co-ordinating body of black education issues". In 1971, New Beacon Books, on behalf of CECWA, published How the West Indian Child is Made Educationally Sub-normal in the British School System by Bernard Coard, which drew national attention to the issue of ESN schools. In the book, Coard acknowledges Buhsell's support in his research and writing. Bushell was interviewed in the 2021 BBC One documentary film Subnormal: A British Scandal, which describes the events surrounding the racism of a leaked school report that led to the publication of Coard's book.

CECWA was also key to the development of independent black supplementary schools.

== Later career and retirement ==
In 1975, Bushell completed a master's degree at the Institute of Education in Child Development. However, despite working for Croydon School Psychological Services for more than two decades, she was never promoted to a senior role, which she believes was directly related to her view on intelligence testing and race.

On her retirement in 1989, Bushell began a consultancy service, which continued her work on the educational and emotional needs of black children in care.
