= How the West Indian Child Is Made Educationally Sub-normal in the British School System =

1971 book

- Author: Bernard Coard
- Cover artist: Errol Lloyd
- Language: English
- Subject: Education
- Genre: Non-fiction
- Publisher: New Beacon Books
- Publication date: May 1971
- Publication place: United Kingdom
- Media type: Print
- Pages: 51 pages
- ISBN: 9780900415005
- OCLC: 490662569

How the West Indian Child Is Made Educationally Sub-normal in the British School System: The Scandal of the Black Child in Schools in Britain is a non-fiction book by Grenadian author Bernard Coard published in May 1971 by New Beacon Books in the United Kingdom. In the book, Coard examines educational inequality and institutional racism in the British educational system through the lens of the country's "educationally subnormal" (ESN) schools (Note: One of eleven special education categories introduced in 1945, "educationally sub-normal to a moderate degree" (ESN(M)) schools persisted until 1978, which saw the release of the Warnock report.)—previously called "schools for the mentally subnormal"—which disproportionately and enrolled Black children, especially those from the British Caribbean community. These students rarely advanced out of ESN schools and suffered educationally and economically. Coard also intentionally made a "critical decision" to write specifically for an audience of Black parents.

The book was first prepared by Coard as a paper he presented at a Caribbean Education and Community Workers' Association (CECWA) conference in early 1970; after positive reception, he expanded and completed the book during that summer. Figures such as Jeff Crawford, Jessica Huntley, John La Rose, Waveney Bushell and Andrew Salkey lent their support towards publicity and publication, as did Bogle-L'Ouverture Publications. New Beacon published the book in 1971, printing 10,000 copies and following that up with a second run in 1974. On the book's release day, Coard appeared on primetime news in a discussion with the chief education officer of the Inner London Education Authority, Ashley Bramall. Following publication, Coard claimed that he and his wife were being followed and that his phone was being tapped.

The text is also prominently featured in Tell It Like It Is: How Our Schools Fail Black Children (2005), edited by Brian Richardson.

The 2021 BBC One documentary Subnormal: A British Scandal describes the events surrounding the racism of a leaked school report, leading to the publication of Coard's book. Produced and directed by Lyttanya Shannon, with executive producers including Steve McQueen, the film features interviews with people who were put into ESN schools, and with activists, academics and psychologists and others who worked to expose the scandal at the time, such as Gus John, Waveney Bushell and Coard.

== See also ==
- Education in England
- Education (2020 film)
- Race and intelligence
