= Gus John =

British writer and educator (born 1945)

Professor Gus John
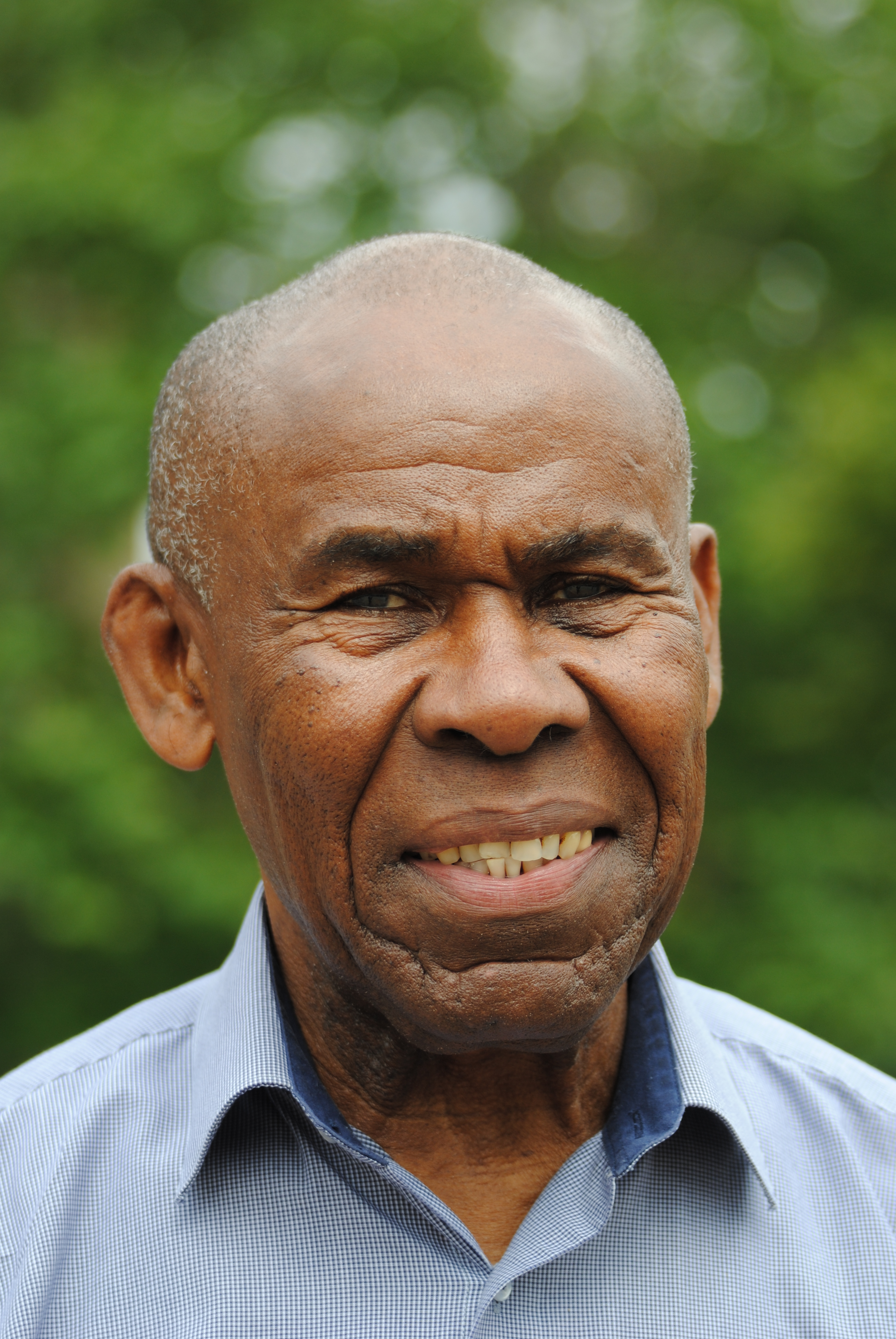
- John in July 2019
- Born: Augustine Gregory John; 11 March 1945 (age 81); Concord, Grenada, Eastern Caribbean
- Education: Presentation Boys College; Oxford University
- Occupations: Writer, education campaigner, consultant, lecturer, researcher
- Writing career
- Notable work: Because They're Black (1972)
- Notable awards: Martin Luther King Memorial Prize
- Gus John's voice recorded in July 2019
- Website: gusjohn.com

Augustine Gregory John (born 11 March 1945) is a Grenadian-born writer, education campaigner, consultant, lecturer and researcher, who moved to the UK in 1964. He has worked in the fields of education policy, management and international development. As a social analyst, he specialises in social audits, change management, policy formulation and review, and programme evaluation and development. Since the 1960s, he has been active in issues of education and schooling in Britain's inner cities such as Manchester, Birmingham and London, and was the first black Director of Education and Leisure Services in Britain.

He has also worked in a number of university settings, including as visiting Faculty Professor of Education at the University of Strathclyde in Glasgow, as an associate professor of education and honorary fellow of the London Centre for Leadership in Learning at the UCL Institute of Education, University of London, and visiting professor at Coventry University. A respected public speaker and media commentator, he works internationally as an executive coach and a management and social investment consultant.

== Early life and education ==
Gus John was born in the village of Concord in Grenada, Eastern Caribbean, to parents who were peasant farmers. At the age of 12, he won a scholarship to attend secondary school at the prestigious Presentation Boys College in St George's, the island's capital. At the age of 17, he joined a seminary in Trinidad, where he spent two years as a theology student.

At the age of 19, he went to England, transferring to the Theology programme at Oxford University. He became Chair of the Education Subcommittee of the Oxford Committee for Racial Integration (OCRI), and recalls:

OCRI as it was called then was run by a woman who became a veteran in the anti-racist movement, the late Ann Dummett and her husband the late Professor Michael Dummett. As I engaged in the middle 1960s with the English schooling system and with academia at Oxford University, where I was a member of the African and Caribbean Students Society, I soon became convinced that Britain faced two momentous challenges. One was to determine who and what it was and what its place in global politics was as it tried to remake itself after two devastating world wars, with only two decades separating them. The second and closely related challenge was to determine how it would deal with the legacy of Empire.

Having been a Dominican friar from 1964 to 1967, John split with the order because of the church's links with apartheid South Africa. In the late 1960s he took employment as a gravedigger by day while working by night in an inner-city youth club.

== Community activism ==
Maintaining his interest in "schooling and education, youth development and the empowerment of marginalised groups within communities", John became a community activist. In the mid- to late 1960s, he became a member of the Campaign Against Racial Discrimination (CARD), the civil rights organisation led by David Pitt. In 1968, he started the first Saturday/Supplementary school in Handsworth, Birmingham, with a group of colleagues. After working on youth and race in Handsworth for the Runnymede Trust, he went in January 1971 to Moss Side, Manchester, where he continued organising and campaigning on four issues in particular: housing and the specific difficulties for young people to get houses on their own; employment for black school leavers; the way the community was policed; and the quality of schooling outcomes for black school leavers. The following year, as he recalled:

I had got some money from the British Council of Churches to set up a hostel for young black people, because they were sleeping on their friends' floors or sleeping rough in Moss Side, the reason being that their parents had been decanted to places like Sale and Partington, as part of the whole so-called regeneration business. And they continued to gravitate back to Moss Side, they would be here until after the last bus left, some of them would be in the night time dives – shebeens as we used to call them – and there was generally a sense of drift and disaffection amongst them. That made them even more in danger of getting involved with the police.

He was a member of the Council of the Institute of Race Relations in the early 1970s. In 1972, Because They're Black, a book on which he collaborated with Derek Humphry, was awarded the Martin Luther King Memorial Prize for its contribution to racial harmony in Britain, and Gus John went on to produce many other notable publications. His 1976 work The New Black Presence in Britain was "One of the earliest texts written by a Black Christian in Britain that began to articulate a distinct and conscious experience of black religious sensibilities" and he has been called described as "a grand patriarch of black theology in Britain".

By 1981, John was the northern organiser of the New Cross Massacre Action Committee, and one of the organisers of the "Black People's Day of Action" held on 2 March, a response to the New Cross Fire on 18 January in which 13 young black people died. Following the uprisings in Moss Side in July 1981 he chaired the Moss Side Defence Committee, and he was adviser to the Liverpool 8 Defence Committee following the Toxteth Uprisings that same year.

He was the co-ordinator of the Black Parents Movement in Manchester, founded the Education for Liberation book service and helped to organise the International Book Fair of Radical Black and Third World Books in Manchester, London and Bradford. He was a member of the 1987 Macdonald Inquiry into Racism and Racial Violence in Manchester Schools and subsequently co-authored (with Ian Macdonald, Reena Bhavnani and Lily Khan) Murder in the Playground: the Burnage Report. He was a founder trustee of the George Padmore Institute under the chairmanship of John La Rose. In 1989 John was appointed Director of Education in Hackney and was the first black person to hold such a position. When the two departments were amalgamated he became Hackney's first Director of Education and Leisure Services.

== Writings ==
John's writings encompass reports, journalism and a variety of non-fiction books, including in 2023 Don't Salvage the Empire Windrush and Blazing Trails: Stories of a Heroic Generation, both published by New Beacon Books. Reviewing these recent works in the Camden New Journal, Angela Cobbinah said of John: "Never one to mince his words and with a stern public persona to boot, he has been a thorn in the side of successive governments from his position on the front line of the anti-racist struggle for the last six decades." In Blazing Trails, John pays tribute "to a truly heroic generation: twenty-two individuals whose lives were dedicated to the struggle for racial equality and social justice in post-war Britain", while in Don't Salvage the Empire Windrush he "debunks the notion that the arrival of the Empire Windrush in 1948 marked the beginning of the evolution and growth of multiracial Britain", which narrative "displaces the history of those settled Black communities who had struggled against racism and marginalisation in Britain prior to its arrival".

He has contributed to such UK outlets as The Guardian and The Voice, and is a regular guest columnist for The Jamaica Gleaner.

== Consulting and advisory work ==
Since leaving Hackney in 1996, Gus John has worked as an educational consultant in Europe, the Caribbean and Africa, and is director of Gus John Consultancy Limited. He has been Chair of the Communities Empowerment Network (CEN), an advocacy and campaigning service working for equality and justice in education founded in 1999, and is Chair of Parents and Students Empowerment (PaSE), an organisation devoted to empowering students and parents in schooling and education.

He chaired the "Round Table" for the National Union of Teachers (NUT) in October 2006/March 2007 and produced Born to be Great, the NUT's Charter on Promoting the Achievement of Black Caribbean Boys (2007). In 2010, he produced The Case for a Learners' Charter for Schools, a charter that articulates the educational entitlement of all school students and the rights and responsibilities of everybody engaged in the schooling process – local authorities, school governors, teachers, pupils and parents.

He was a member of Channel 4's Street Weapons Commission and later adviser to London Mayor Boris Johnson on serious youth violence in the capital.

Since 2006, John has been a member of the African Union's Technical Committee of Experts working on "modalities for reunifying Africa and its global diaspora". He has advised member states in Africa and the Caribbean (Cameroon, Somaliland, Lagos State Government, Jamaica) in meeting the Sustainable Development Goals related to education and youth. Between 2004 and 2012 John worked on Niger Delta affairs and in 2012 collaborated with Kingsley Kuku, the then special adviser to President Goodluck Jonathan, and David Keighe on a development manual entitled Remaking the Niger Delta: Challenges and Opportunities. In 2008, he co-authored with Samina Zahir Speaking Truth to Power, which resulted from research for Arts Council England on identity, aesthetics and ethnicity in theatre and the arts.

Among other recent undertakings, he has since 2011 been a consultant to the Methodist Church, UK, on implementing Equality and Human Rights legislation, and in 2012 was appointed to chair the Expert Advisory Group on Equality, Diversity and Social Mobility as part of the Legal Education and Training Review (LETR). He was commissioned by the Solicitors Regulation Authority (SRA) to undertake a comparative review of how the SRA has dealt with disciplinary cases and especially the over-representative number of black and ethnic minority solicitors that are sanctioned by that regulator, John's report being published in 2014.

John made a submission to the United Kingdom Parliament's 2017 Youth Violence Commission, which he subsequently published in digest form.

In 2019, John quit from an advisory body to the Church of England, after Archbishop Justin Welby endorsed the criticism of Labour Party leader Jeremy Corbyn by the chief rabbi Ephraim Mirvis, making allegations of antisemitism. John said: "What gives the archbishop of Canterbury the right to endorse the chief rabbi's scaremongering about Corbyn and adopt such a lofty moral position in defence of the Jewish population?"

== Honours ==
In October 1999, Gus John was asked by Tony Blair to accept a CBE (Commander of the Order of the British Empire) in the New Year Honours List, 2000. Declining, John said that he believed such honours to be anachronistic and indeed an insult to the struggles of African people like himself who have spent their life trying to humanise British society and combating racism, which is a core part of the legacy of Empire and which the society and its institutions are perennially failing to confront. He was quoted by The Guardian as saying:

I had to decline because everything I have done in my life in this country since 1964 has been in the struggle for racial equality and social justice. One of the major impediments to promoting racial equality is the legacy of empire. I believe the whole thing is iniquitous. People think I'm being churlish campaigning against empire but I am struggling to end the injustice and inequality that whole damn thing is built upon.

The journalist Jon Snow, who himself refused an OBE, made a special study of the honours system, writing in The Independent: "Gus John, the Afro-Caribbean former Director of Education for Hackney, explained to me what it felt like for him to be approached with the offer of being appointed CBE. 'I regard [the title] Commander of the British Empire as part of the iconography of British imperialism,' he said." Snow subsequently commented to a Parliamentary Select Committee investigating criticism of the honours system on John's position: "As he had fought his whole life trying to unpick the consequences of British imperialism, he felt it was a pretty serious dishonour to have to wander round the planet henceforth as a Commander of the very institution he had tried to demolish."

In 2015, Gus John's 70th birthday was marked by events honouring his five decades of activism in Britain: on 11 March at Conway Hall, on 14 March at the British Film Institute, in conversation with Gary Younge, and on 19 April at the Phoenix Cinema, in conversation with Margaret Busby.

A 1979 portrait of John, by the photographer Brian Shuel, is in the collection of the National Portrait Gallery.

Professor Gus John was voted one of the "100 Great Black Britons" in the 2020 poll and book initiated by Patrick Vernon.

In October 2020, John was named by FutureLearn on a list of "12 Black history pioneers with careers that will inspire you", together with Lewis Latimer, Shirley Jackson, Lisa Gelobter, Yvonne Connolly, Susie King Taylor, Mary Seacole, Alexa Canady, Charles DeWitt Watts, Kanya King, Oprah Winfrey, and Madam C. J. Walker.

== Selected publications ==
=== Books and reports ===
- 1970 – Race in the Inner City, a study of young people in Handsworth, Birmingham. London: Runnymede Trust.
- 1971 – Because They're Black (with Derek Humphry). London: Penguin. Winner of Martin Luther King Memorial Prize, 1972.
- 1972 – Police Power and Black People (with Derek Humphry). London: Panther, Granada Publishing.
- 1973 – The Hilton Project – a study of Moss Side, Manchester (with Bryce Anderson, Carol Milton and Tony Pritchard), Manchester: Youth Development Trust.
- 1976 – The New Black Presence in Britain. London: British Council of Churches.
- 1981 – In the Service of Black Youth: A Study of the Political Culture of Youth and Community Work with Black People in English Cities. Leicester: National Association of Youth Clubs.
- 1989 – Murder in the Playground: the Burnage Report (with Ian Macdonald, Reena Bhavnani and Lily Khan). London: Longsight Press.
- 1991 – Education for Citizenship. London: Charter 88 Trust.
- 2003 – The Crisis Facing Black Children in the British Schooling System. Gus John Partnership.
- 2005 – School Exclusion and Transition into Adulthood in African Caribbean Communities (with Cecile Wright, Penny Standen and Gerry German and Tina Patel). York: Joseph Rowntree Foundation.
- 2006 – Taking A Stand: Gus John Speaks on Education, Race, Social Action and Civil Unrest 1980–2005. Gus John Partnership; ISBN 978-0954784317.
- 2007 – Emancipate Yourself...Choose Life! Essays on the 1807 Abolition of the Slave Trade Act and on gun and knife crime and gang activity in urban areas. Gus John Partnership Limited.
- 2007 – Born to be Great: A Charter on Promoting the Achievement of Black Caribbean Boys, National Union of Teachers.
- 2008 – Speaking Truth to Power – critical debate on Identity, Aesthetics and Ethnicity; a diversity of voices in theatre and the Arts in England (with Samina Zahir), Arts Council England.
- 2010 – Time to Tell – the Grenada Massacre and After... Grenada Diary 14–25 December 1983. London: Gus John Books.
- 2010 – The Case for a Learner's Charter for Schools (with an introduction by Chris Searle). London: Gus John/New Beacon Books.
- 2011 – The New Cross Massacre Story.
- 2011 – Moss Side 1981: More Than Just a Riot (with essays by Michael Ignatieff and Paul Rock). Gus John Books; ISBN 978-0954784362.
- 2014 – Report to the Solicitors Regulation Authority on the independent comparative case review of disproportionality in regulatory action and outcomes for BME solicitors, SRA Birmingham, March 2014.
- 2023 – Blazing Trails: Stories of a Heroic Generation (Preface by Margaret Busby), London: New Beacon Books, ISBN 9781739334604.
- 2023 – Don't Salvage the Empire Windrush (Preface by Professor Lez Henry), London: New Beacon Books, ISBN 9781739334628.

=== Articles ===
- 1991 – "A View from Britain", in Abdul Alkalimat (ed.), Perspectives on Black Liberation and Social Revolution – Malcolm X: Radical Tradition and a Legacy of Struggle. Chicago: 21st Century Books.
- 1992 – "Education & the Community in a Metropolis", in Michael Barber (ed.), Education in the Capital, London: Cassell Education.
- 2022 – Foreword to The Frontline: A Study of Struggle, Resistance and Black Identity in Notting Hill, edited by Ishmahil Blagrove Jr.
