= Education (film) =

2020 film of Small Axe anthology series

- Advertising image for Small Axe that features a still from Education. Note that the poster advertises the entire series; the actors named at the top of the poster appear in other films in the anthology.
- Genre: Historical drama
- Written by: Steve McQueen; Alastair Siddons
- Directed by: Steve McQueen
- Country of origin: United Kingdom
- Original language: English

Production
- Running time: 63 minutes

Original release
- Network: BBC One
- Release: 13 December 2020

Education is a 2020 drama film directed by Steve McQueen and co-written by McQueen and Alastair Siddons. The film was released as part of the anthology series Small Axe on BBC One on 13 December 2020, in the Netherlands on 16 December 2020, and on Amazon Prime Video on 18 December 2020.

== Cast ==
- Kenyah Sandy as Kingsley Smith
- Sharlene Whyte as Agnes Smith
- Tamara Lawrance as Stephanie Smith
- Daniel Francis as Esmond Smith
- Josette Simon as Lydia Thomas
- Naomi Ackie as Hazel
- Ryan Masher as Joseph
- Jairaj Varsani as Sajid
- Tabitha Byron as Sheila
- Roshawn Hewitt as Baz
- Aiyana Goodfellow as Nina
- Nathan Moses as Ashley
- Jo Martin as Mrs. Tabitha Bartholomew
- Kate Dickie as Miss Gill
- Stewart Wright as Mr. Baines
- Jade Anouka as Mrs. Morrison
- Adrian Rawlins as Headmaster Evans
- Nigel Boyle as Mr. Hamley

== Background ==
Although the characters in Education are fictional, the film is based on real-life events of the 1970s, when some London councils followed an unofficial policy of transferring disproportionate numbers of black children from mainstream education to schools for the so-called "educationally subnormal". The practice was exposed by educationalist Bernard Coard in his 1971 book How the West Indian Child is Made Educationally Sub-normal in the British School System.

== Reception ==
On review aggregator Rotten Tomatoes, the film holds an approval rating of 96% based on 48 critic reviews, with an average rating of 8.1/10. The website's critics consensus reads, "Education casts its hopeful gaze on the future, offering a simple and effective end to the Small Axe series that solidifies Steve McQueen['s] place as a master storyteller." Metacritic assigned the film a weighted average score of 87 out of 100, based on 15 critics, indicating "universal acclaim".

Peter Debruge of Variety praised Education for its "clever" approach to portraying the subtle ways in which segregation occurs in early education without "being reductive about the institution or its employees." He compared the film's "grainy, naturalistic" style to the works of Alan Clarke and Play for Today.
