= George Padmore Institute =

British archive and educational resource

Coordinates: 51.5680°N 0.1096°W

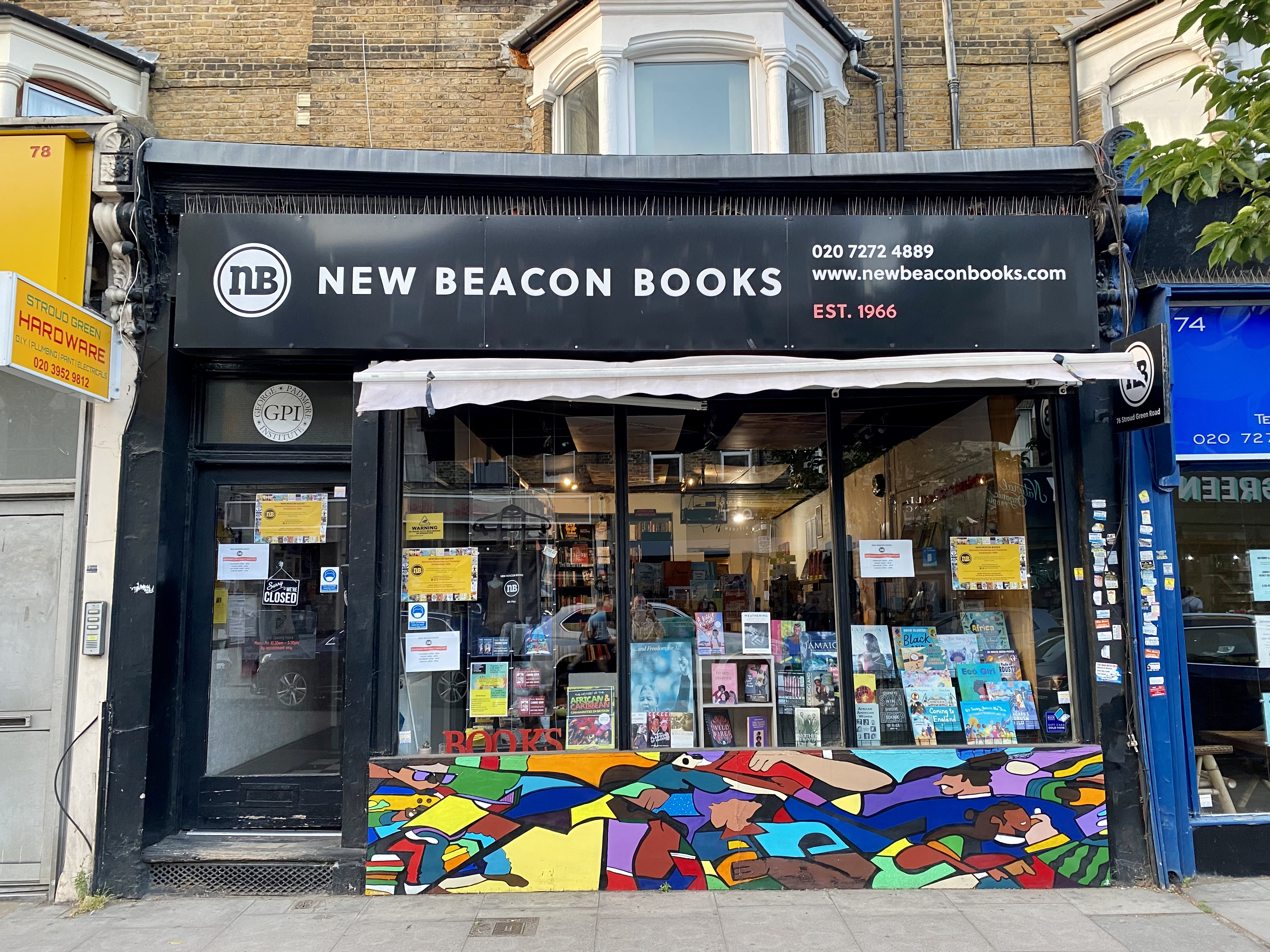
- Formation: 1991; 35 years ago
- Founder: John La Rose
- Purpose: Archive, educational research and information centre
- Headquarters: 76 Stroud Green Road, Finsbury Park, London, N4 3EN, UK
- Location: 76 Stroud Green Road, London, N4
- Key people: Roxy Harris (chair)
- Affiliations: New Beacon Books
- Website: www.georgepadmoreinstitute.org

The George Padmore Institute (GPI), founded in 1991 in Stroud Green Road, North London, by John La Rose (1927–2006) and a group of political and cultural activists connected to New Beacon Books, is an archive, library, educational resource and research centre that houses "materials relating to the black community of Caribbean, African and Asian descent in Britain and continental Europe". The institute also hosts talks and readings, as well as other educational and cultural activities.

== History ==
The George Padmore Institute (GPI) is named in honour of Trinidad-born pan-Africanist George Padmore, although the organisation does not house archive collections relating to him. The George Padmore Institute was founded in 1991 by John La Rose together with fellow political and cultural activists, including Sarah White, Gus John, and others.

The work of the GPI is directed by a board of trustees, whose founding chair was La Rose. Current and former trustees include Sharmilla Beezmohun, Aggrey Burke, Janice Durham, Azim Hajee (treasurer), Roxy Harris (chair), Ali Hussein (vice-chair), Linton Kwesi Johnson, Milverton Wallace (died 2021), and Sarah White (died 2022).

The ground floor of the GPI building is occupied by New Beacon Bookshop, which has been based there since 1973.

== Exhibitions and programming ==
Since 2010, the GPI has been the recipient of grants from the Heritage Lottery Fund to catalogue and interpret its collections and materials. Among other projects, the funding has enabled the GPI to open up to public access the archives of founding chair John La Rose through The Dream to Change the World Project. The exhibition Dream to Change the World: The Life & Legacy of John La Rose was mounted at Islington Museum from 22 May to 29 August 2015, with a number of associated public events and workshops for schools taking place during the course of the exhibition.

== Archives held ==
The archives in the care of the GPI include the following:

- The Caribbean Artists Movement (1966–72)
- The Black Education Movement and the Black Supplementary Schools Movement (1960s–present)
- Committee for the Release of Political Prisoners in Kenya (1975–1998)
- The Black Parents Movement, The Black Youth Movement and the Alliance with the Race Today and Northern Black Collectives (1975–late 1980s)
- The New Cross Massacre Action Committee (1981)
- The International Book Fair of Radical Black and Third World Books (1982–95)
- European Action for Racial Equality and Social Justice (early- to mid-1990s)
- The Carnival Movement (1970–1990s)
- New Beacon Books (1966–present)
- The Macdonald Inquiry into Racism in Manchester Schools (1987)
- Personal archives of John La Rose
