= Bellevue Hospital, Jamaica =

Hospital in Jamaica

Coordinates: 17.9700943399404°N 76.77214436837086°W

The Bellevue Hospital is a psychiatric hospital in Jamaica, established with its current name in 1946, previously named the Jamaica Mental Hospital in 1938, and prior to that existed as the Jamaica Lunatic Asylum since 1861.

The hospital was established as a result of a petition by physician Louis Quier Bowerbank.

During the early 1970s, psychiatrist Aggrey Burke conducted studies on the mental health of repatriates at the hospital, noting that a significant number of admissions were repatriates from England.
