= Fordham Park =

Public park in New Cross, London, England

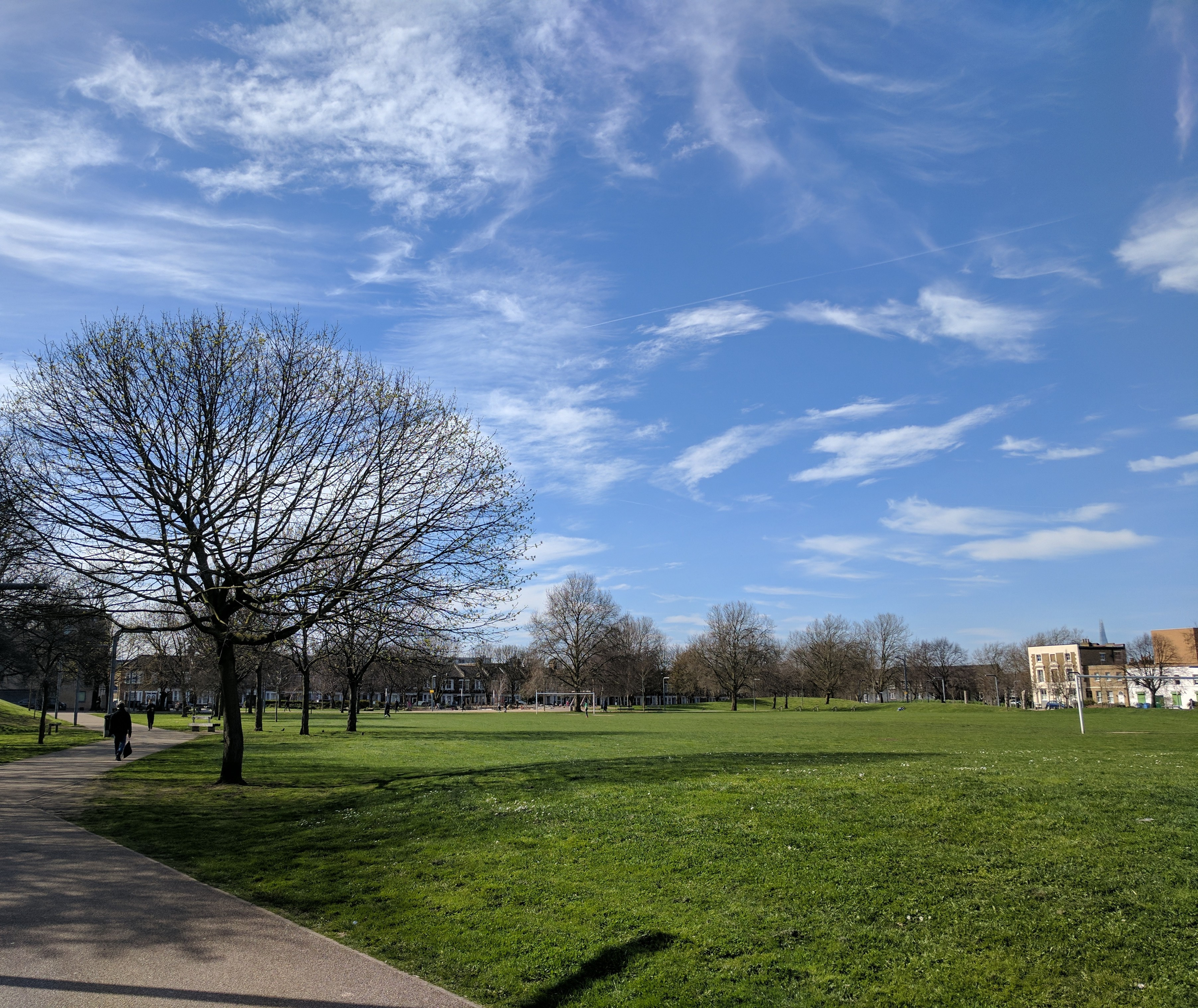
- Fordham Park
- Interactive map of Fordham Park
- Type: Public park
- Location: London, England
- Coordinates: 51°28′38″N 0°02′11″W
- Status: Open year round
- Website: lewisham.gov.uk

Fordham Park is a public park in New Cross, London, England, owned and managed by the London Borough of Lewisham. It lies in between New Cross and New Cross Gate railway stations, and just north of the A2 road between London and Dover. It is immediately south to Deptford Green School, and is often used by students as a sports area.

The park in New Cross was regenerated in 2010 with new lighting, trees, furniture and play elements being added to the park.

The park contains a public memorial plaque and bench dedicated to the victims of the New Cross house fire of 1981; the memorials were installed in 2012.

== Deptford Urban Free festival ==
From 1990 to 1996 Fordham park was the venue of the annual Deptford Urban Free Festival. Such bands as Back to the Planet and Test Dept played at the festival.

== External sources ==
- Official website
