= Syd Burke =

Broadcaster, photographer and journalist (1938–2010)

- Born: Edmund Burke; 1938; Jamaica
- Died: 30 July 2010 (aged 72); London, England
- Education: Cornwall College; Excelsior High School; North London Polytechnic
- Occupations: Broadcaster, photographer and journalist
- Known for: Radio programme Rice 'n' Peas
- Relatives: Aggrey Burke (brother)

Edmund Burke (1938 – 30 July 2010), known as Syd Burke, was a broadcaster, photographer and journalist, who moved to the UK from Jamaica to study photography in 1960, after having studied engineering, and later hosted London Broadcasting Corporation's (LBC) Rice 'n' Peas, a popular magazine programme.

He was the brother of psychiatrist and academic Aggrey Burke.

== Early life and education ==
Burke was born in Jamaica, the eldest of six children. He first attended Cornwall College in Montego Bay, and then Excelsior High School, where he was head boy.

== Career ==
He moved to the UK in 1960 to study photography at the North London Polytechnic, after having studied engineering in Jamaica. Burke was soon working as a professional photographer, while also starting a career as a broadcaster. During the 1970s and 1980s he became well known in the UK as one of the first black journalists and the host of London Broadcasting Corporation's (LBC) Rice 'n' Peas, a popular magazine programme, which he presented for seven years, and which he described was from "a black point of view".

Burke's contribution to community programming is sometimes cited alongside that of Mike Phillips and Alex Pascall, who presented BBC Radio London's Black Londoners. Burke also wrote as a journalist.

Following a career at LBC, he ran a training programme for young broadcasters.

In late January 1983 Burke joined the newly established independent television network Channel 4 as a continuity announcer. Other television work that Burke was involved with in the 1980s included appearing on BBC Two's programme Ebony, reviewing the British press.

A photograph by Burke appeared in the catalogue of the 1997 exhibition Transforming the Crown: African, Asian and Caribbean Artists in Britain 1966 – 1996.

He was a recipient of a Hansib award.

== Personal and family ==
Burke married Veronica and they had three sons. One of his younger brothers is psychiatrist and specialist in transcultural psychiatry Aggrey Burke.

== Death ==
On 30 July 2010, Burke died of cancer of the colon at the Charing Cross Hospital, Hammersmith.
