= Death of Orville Blackwood =

1991 death of a black man in a psychiatric hospital

- Orville Blackwood
- Date: 28 August 1991
- Venue: Broadmoor Hospital
- Location: Berkshire
- Cause: Overdose with promazine and fluphenazine
- Inquiries: Report of the committee of inquiry into the death in Broadmoor Hospital of Orville Blackwood, and a review of the deaths of two other Afro-Caribbean patients: "big, black and dangerous?"
- Verdict: “Accidental death”

Orville Blackwood (June 1960 – 28 August 1991) was a Jamaican-born British man, whose death at Broadmoor Hospital on 28 August 1991, following the administration of large doses of antipsychotic medications, resulted in wide media coverage after an inquiry into the circumstances surrounding his death. The inquiry published a report in 1993 titled 'Report of the committee of inquiry into the death in Broadmoor Hospital of Orville Blackwood, and a review of the deaths of two other Afro-Caribbean patients: "big, black and dangerous?".

Blackwood moved to England with his mother when he was a child. In his 20s, he found it hard to hold down employment, became involved in petty crime and served brief prison sentences. He became known to mental health services in January 1982, following which a series of brief admissions became the pattern over subsequent years, with states of highs and agitation, sexual disinhibition and aggression. In January 1986, using a toy gun, he attempted to rob a betting shop, for which he received a three-year sentence and was sent to HM Prison Grendon, before being transferred to Broadmoor, a combination high-security prison / psychiatric hospital. There, several times he was restrained, placed in seclusion and administered large doses of medications in response to his behaviour.

In September 1991, an independent inquiry, chaired by Herschel Prins, was set up by the Special Hospitals Service Authority. It also looked at two other deaths at the same hospital. The report was highly critical of the care received by Blackwood and it made 47 recommendations. The report identified how hospital admissions of black people were more likely to have police involvement, and include detainment and secure care. They were more likely to be diagnosed with schizophrenia and to be given higher doses of medication, and were less likely to receive psychotherapy.

== Background ==
=== High-security psychiatric hospitals ===
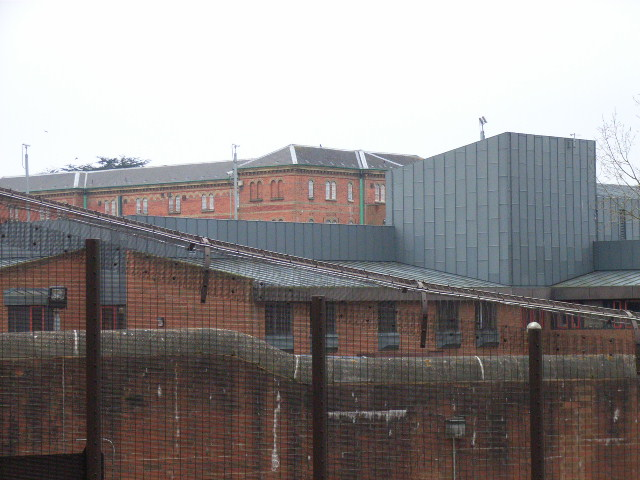
Broadmoor Hospital

In 2010, The Black Manifesto found that 40% of patients at England's three high-security psychiatric hospitals Ashworth Hospital, Rampton Secure Hospital and Broadmoor, were of African-Caribbean origin. These units are for those who pose a “grave and immediate danger to the general public”. Most have been convicted of serious crimes such as murders or sexual offences. Around 10% of black patients in such settings had not committed any crime.

=== Orville Blackwood ===
Orville Blackwood was born in Jamaica in June 1960. His mother was Clara Buckley, and he had at least one sister. He was brought up in South London and later became a naturalized British citizen. At school, he had difficulties learning to read and write. In the early 1980s, when in his 20s, he found it hard to hold down employment, became involved in small crimes and served brief prison sentences. At the same time his mental health began to decline and in January 1982, he became known to the mental health services and was admitted to hospital. At the time he was described as "acutely disturbed, dishevelled, angry and suspicious". That year he began to hear voices and behave "in a bizarre manner" and at his admission in August of that year, he bit a nurse. A series of brief admissions became the pattern over the subsequent four years, with states of highs and agitation, sexual disinhibition, aggression and according to the hospital authorities he "lacked any insight".

In January 1986, using a toy gun, he attempted to rob a betting shop and was subsequently arrested and examined in HM Prison Brixton. No mental illness had been diagnosed at that time. He received a three-year sentence and while being moved to HM Prison Grendon, he was noted to be in a state of paranoia and aggression, and at one time tried to hang himself. In October 1987, he was moved to Broadmoor Hospital, a combination of a high security prison and a mental hospital, catering for people who had committed serious crime such murders, manslaughter and sexual offences. There, several times he was restrained, placed in seclusion and administered large doses of medications in response to his behaviour.

On the morning of 28 August 1991, he voluntarily made his way to "seclusion" after refusing to attend his occupational therapy session. When a group of health professionals entered his room several hours later, he became aggressive. Under the instruction of his physicians, he was held down and injected with promazine, a major tranquilliser, at three times the maximum dose as stated in the British National Formulary, and with twice the recommended dose of fluphenazine. Blackwood died almost immediately, the third black patient, after Michael Martin and Joseph Watts, to die at the hospital within seven years, under similar circumstances.

== The inquiry ==
The cause of death, as given by the pathologist was “cardiac failure associated with the administration of phenothiazine drugs". The inquest verdict was “accidental death”.

An independent inquiry was set up by the Special Hospitals Service Authority in September 1991, with Herschel Prins as the principal investigator. Prins was, in addition, asked to look into the two other deaths at the same hospital; Michael Martin and Joseph Watts. The objective was to investigate the circumstances that led to Blackwood's death and to assess the previous Martins and Watts' inquiry reports, with the aim to reveal any common factors and patterns to all three deaths. Unlike some of the other inquiries of the time, it was not seeking out blame and as a result encouraged staff to engage.

== The report ==
Titled Report of the committee of inquiry into the death in Broadmoor Hospital of Orville Blackwood, and a review of the deaths of two other Afro-Caribbean patients: "big, black and dangerous?" (1993), it was authored by Prins, T. Backer-Holst, E. Francis and I. Keitch, and was highly critical of how the Criminal Justice System and mental health services treated Blackwood.

Blackwood's history is given in the first part of the report. He was described as a man born in Jamaica and of large stature. It described his encounters with police and the several convictions for minor crimes. The inquiry noted, that in his early 20s his diagnosis varied; acute paranoid state, drug induced psychosis, acute situational psychosis, and psychotic reaction in an inadequate personality. The inquiry also gathered information from Blackwood's family, who held support in the diagnosis made by Aggrey Burke, a black psychiatrist. Noted in the inquiry was an alternative view of Blackwood by Burke, whose experience with mental illness in African and Caribbean young men led him to agree that he had a psychosis but disagreed that Blackwood had schizophrenia and posed that Blackwood was "not without insight, rather he was a man with profound insight". The report noted that apparently no one thought to ask him why he did not wish to attend his occupational therapy session that morning.

On the issue of Blackwood's exact diagnosis, although it did not directly cause his death, the report stated "diagnosis did...play a very significant role in his admission to secure psychiatric facilities and eventually to Broadmoor". Blackwood believed he should not have been detained at Broadmoor; his crime was "small" and he had completed his sentence. The report noted that this caused him frustration, anger and feelings of unfairness, sometimes shown "though aggression and violence". The inquiry investigators felt that the service delivered to Blackwood took little account of the stresses from Blackwood's background, and relied more on the preconceptions and expectations of him through racist labelling. This triggered a series of events leading to his death. It stated:

Patients are aware that racism exists, but because the staff and management at the hospital do not recognise the subtle way in which racism can operate they do not see it as a problem and there is a dissonance of viewpoint. Broadmoor Hospital is a white, middle-class institution in rural Berkshire. African-Caribbean patients from poor inner city areas therefore find themselves in an alien environment. The closed, in-bred community of nurses some from a military-type background, has little understanding of the needs and cultural differences of ethnic minority patients. It is not good enough to maintain that all patients are treated the same, regardless of colour or ethnic background. Management and staff alike need to recognise that there are differences, and these differences need to be catered for.

The investigators heard hospital staff use the term "big, black and dangerous" so often in their inquiry that they incorporated it, with a question mark, as the sub-title of their report. The term reflected the racist stereotyping that allowed young black men to be restrained rather than receive treatment. The report took the view that how dangerous Blackwood really was had been "overestimated". It included criticism of how Blackwood's family were informed of his death. The report identified that the hospital had an "almost exclusively white workforce", and how hospital admissions of black people were more likely to have police involvement, and include detainment and secure care. They were more likely to be diagnosed with schizophrenia and to be given higher doses of medication, and were less likely to receive psychotherapy.

=== Similarities between the three deaths ===
The deaths of Orville Blackwood, Michael Martin and Joseph Watts had some similarities. All three were black, diagnosed with schizophrenia and died after being placed in seclusion following disagreements or violence with either staff or other patients. None had healthy diets and were as a result overweight. All were likeable when well and feared when violent.

== Recommendations ==
The report made 47 recommendations. Several addressed issues relating to ethnicity, including appointing black staff in senior management posts. The committee suggested further research into administering anti-psychotic medication in emergency settings.

== Follow-up ==
The report received wide media coverage.

According to Prins, Broadmoor initially declined a follow-up visit. However, he reported that in 1998, he was invited to revisit, and he noted:

I was asked to return to Broadmoor to participate in a seminar examining how successful the hospital had been in developing its anti-racist policies and practices! I learnt that there were still no black members of senior management, neither was there any black representation on the managing health authority. It also appeared that there were even fewer black staff working on the wards than at the time of our inquiry. Prins (1998)

It was one inquiry that brought to the attention of psychiatrists a need to consider cultural differences.
