= Molara Wood =

Nigerian writer, journalist and critic (born 1967)

- Born: 1967 (age 58–59); Ilase-Ijesa, Osun State, Nigeria
- Citizenship: Nigerian
- Occupations: Creative writer, journalist and critic
- Awards: John La Rose Memorial Short Story Competition (2008)

Molara Wood (born 1967) is a Nigerian creative writer, journalist and critic. She has been described as "one of the renowned voices in the Arts in Nigeria". Her short stories, flash fiction, poetry and essays have appeared in numerous publications. These include African Literature Today, Chimurenga, Farafina Magazine, Sentinel Poetry, DrumVoices Revue, Sable LitMag, Eclectica Magazine, The New Gong Book of New Nigerian Short Stories (ed. Adewale Maja-Pearce, 2007), and One World: A Global Anthology of Short Stories (ed. Chris Brazier; New Internationalist, 2009). She currently lives in Lagos.

== Background ==
Born in Ilase-Ijesa, Osun State, Nigeria, Molara Wood has lived what she describes as "a fairly nomadic life", encompassing two decades in Britain, where she had initially gone to study ("Three or four years max, was the plan. But life happens. You don't see the years rolling into each other, then you wake up one day, and you've been in England for 20 years"). In a 2015 interview with Oyebade Dosunmu for Aké Review, Wood elaborated: "Even long before my UK days, I had lived in Northern and South-Western Nigeria as well as Los Angeles—all by the age of eleven or twelve. There is a sense in which you're always out of time, out of place—and the years in Britain merely compounded that. The feeling doesn't go away with return to Nigeria, it merely transmute, as people remark about me coming across as someone from 'away', even when I'm trying to blend in. I am therefore pretty sensitive to the permutations of dislocation and re-integration. London served as a window into the world of Nigerian immigrants, revealing the realities of their experiences."

In 2007, her fiction was highly commended in the Commonwealth Broadcasting Association's Short Story Competition. In 2008, Wood won the inaugural John La Rose Memorial Short Story Competition. Since returning to Nigeria, she has been Arts and Culture Editor of Next newspaper (which ceased publication in 2011), and currently writes an Arts column for The Guardian in Lagos, where she is now based. During her time at Next, she was the editor for Teju Cole´s Letters to a young Writer series. She is also a blogger.

Her collection of short stories, Indigo, was published in 2013 by Parrésia Publishers. Indigo was well received, with Critical Literature Review calling it "a reader's pleasure". As Oyebade Dosunmu writes: "Wood tells stories of people who inhabit in between 'indigo' spaces: the borderland of immigration, the no-man's-land of multiculturalism and the frontiers of social mobility. These worlds cycle into one another and their inhabitants spin along, negotiating extremes of human circumstance—barrenness, the (fated) pursuit of glamour, madness, death—struggling, all the while, to plant roots in shifting sand." Many of the stories dealt with the lives of African women negotiating concerns such as barrenness, polygamy and widowhood. Wood has said that "these are the writings of a womanist and a feminist. I have a great empathy, a well of feeling for what women go through. I don't feel these are given adequate treatment in the writings of male writers, so it's really up to us, the female writers, to privilege the voices and experiences of women."

Wood was a judge for the 2015 Etisalat Prize for Literature. She is on the Advisory Board of the Aké Arts and Book Festival and has been a participant in many literary events, including the Lagos Book & Art Festival.

In 2022, she was appointed a writer-in-residence by the Library of Africa and the African Diaspora (LOATAD), based in Accra, Ghana.

== Bibliography ==
- Indigo (short stories), 2013.
