= Howard Journal of Crime and Justice =

The Howard Journal of Crime and Justice
- Discipline: Criminal law
- Language: English
- Edited by: David Wilson, J. Robert Lilly

Publication details
- Former name(s): The Howard Journal of Criminal Justice
- History: 1921–present
- Publisher: Wiley-Blackwell, on behalf of the Howard League for Penal Reform (United Kingdom)
- Frequency: 5/year

Standard abbreviations
- ISO 4: Howard J. Crime Justice

Indexing
- ISSN: 0265-5527

Links
- Journal homepage

The Howard Journal of Crime and Justice (and prior to 2016, The Howard Journal of Criminal Justice) is an academic journal published by Wiley-Blackwell on behalf of the Howard League for Penal Reform five times each year. The editors-in-chief are David Wilson and J. Robert Lilly.

Herschel Albert Prins was on its editorial board in the 1980s.
