= Deptford Green School =

Coeducational comprehensive Secondary School in England

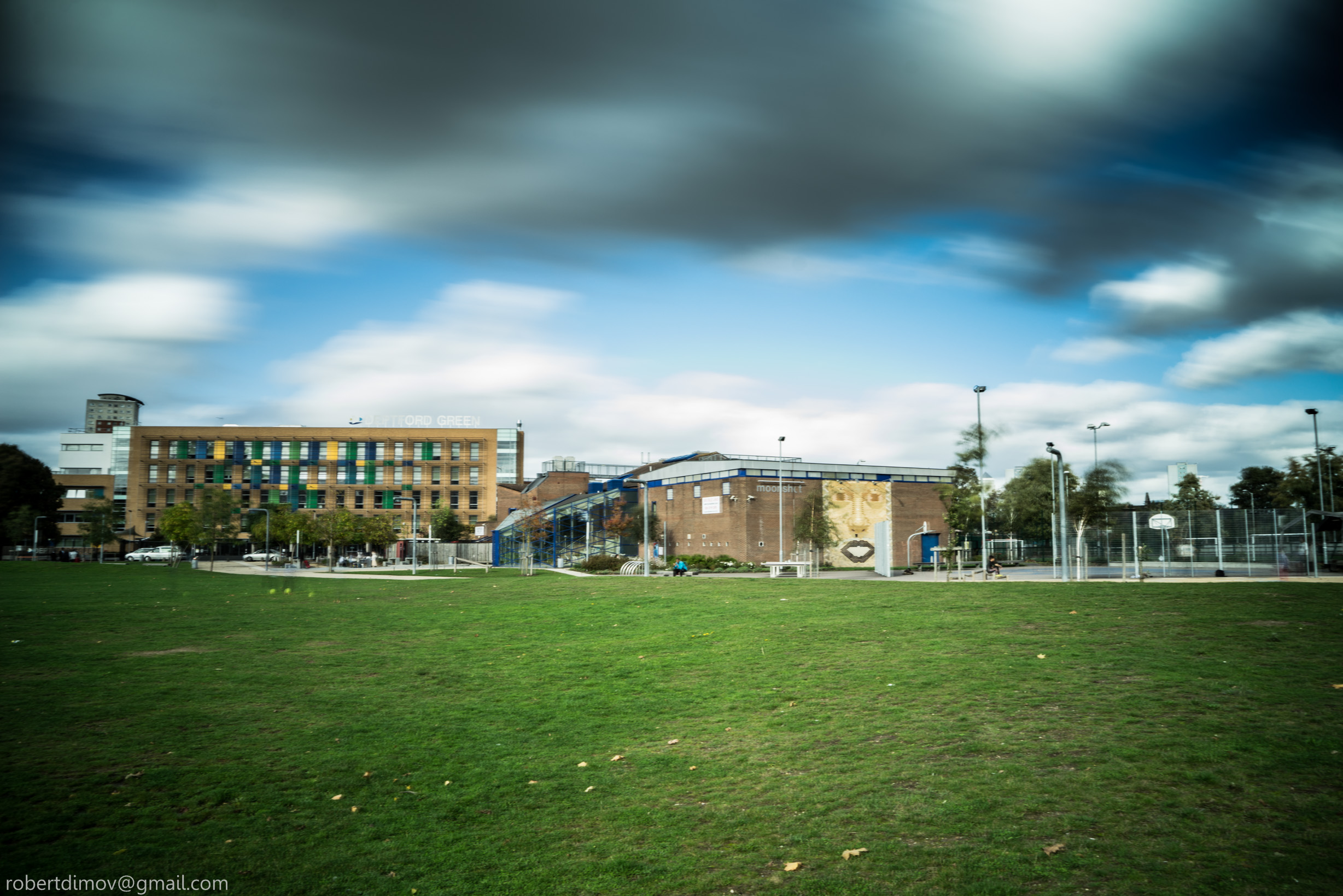
- A panoramic of the school, as seen from Fordham Park

Location
- Amersham Vale; Deptford, London; England
- 51.4793°N 0.0328°W

Information
- Type: Community school
- Local authority: Lewisham
- Department for Education URN: 100740 Tables
- Ofsted: Reports
- Executive Headteacher: Emma Thurston
- Gender: Coeducational
- Age: 11 to 16
- Enrolment: c1100
- Website: http://www.deptfordgreen.lewisham.sch.uk

Deptford Green School is a coeducational comprehensive secondary school in Deptford, Lewisham, England with approximately 1100 pupils. Deptford Green also has specialisms in Humanities, with English, Citizenship and Drama as flagship subjects. The school was also part of the former Crossways Federation, being one of four feeder schools to Crossways Sixth Form, along with Addey and Stanhope School, Catford Business and Enterprise College and Crofton School. In January 2012 Bill Gates visited the school as part of the speakers for schools project. He stated that "Deptford Green is a model of a global school with socially conscious students." Boris Johnson has also visited the school.
