= Herschel Prins =

British professor of criminology (1928–2016)

- Photograph of Prins, published in 2007
- Born: 1928; Finchley, London, England
- Died: 2016 (aged 87–88)

Academic background
- Education: London School of Economics

Academic work
- Discipline: Social work, criminology
- Institutions: North Western Polytechnic; Leeds University; University of Leicester; Loughborough University; Birmingham University

Herschel Albert Prins (1928–2016) was a British professor of criminology. His career spanned over 60 years in work pertaining to forensic psychiatry, and his appointments included positions at the universities of Leeds, Loughborough, Leicester and Birmingham. His roles included HM probation inspectorate, parole board engagement, and involvement in mental health review tribunals and the mental health act commission. He worked with people with malicious activity, antisocial and disinhibited behaviour, unusual sexual deviations and people who behaved dangerously.

During the 1980s Prins was on the editorial board of the Howard Journal of Criminal Justice. In the 1990s he chaired three inquiries into the care and management of patients that had been offenders, including the 1991 independent inquiry into the death of Orville Blackwood, the findings of which were published in the Report of the committee of inquiry into the death in Broadmoor Hospital of Orville Blackwood, and a review of the deaths of two other Afro-Caribbean patients: "big, black and dangerous?" (1993).

By 2007, he had written many articles in The Journal of Forensic Psychiatry & Psychology and several books. The Herschel Prins Centre in Leicester, opened in 2001, is named for him.

== Career ==
Prins' career, much of which is detailed in his book Mad, Bad and Dangerous to Know: Reflections of a Forensic Practitioner (2010), covered over 60 years in work pertaining to forensic psychiatry, and his appointments included university positions, HM probation inspectorate, parole board engagement, and involvement in mental health review tribunals and the mental health act commission. He worked with people with malicious activity, antisocial and disinhibited behaviour, unusual sexual deviations and people who behaved dangerously.

Early in his career he supervised people on probation at Three Counties Hospital, Arlesey, and this led to an interest in mental illness in offenders. After taking evening classes, he gained admission to the London School of Economics to study psychiatric social work. Subsequently, he was posted to Stamford House, a remand home for boys, where he met Peter Duncan Scott, a forensic psychiatrist who influenced him enough that Prins later dedicated his first edition of Offenders, Deviants, or Patients? (1980) to him. Later, he joined the Home Office, where he organized courses for trainee probation officers, with the engagement of psychiatrists, on mental health factors of delinquency. He had also taught at the North Western Polytechnic in Kentish Town, north London, and held an appointment as the Inspectorate of Probation. He was appointed lecturer at Leeds University's social work faculty before taking a teaching appointment as head of the University of Leicester's school of social work, which he held between 1981 and 1984. At Leeds, he had been on the management committee of an aftercare hostel for adult prisoners, and on a local review committee (part of the parole system) at the prison in Leeds. In the 1980s he was also on the editorial board of the Howard Journal of Criminal Justice. Prins became professor at Loughborough University's Midlands Centre for Criminal Justice, while holding an honorary chair in criminology and forensic psychology at Birmingham University.

=== Mental health inquiries ===
Prins chaired three mental health inquiries into the care and management of patients that had been offenders. The first was the independent inquiry into the death of Orville Blackwood in 1991. By the time he was a well-known academic professor, he authored the Report of the committee of inquiry into the death in Broadmoor Hospital of Orville Blackwood, and a review of the deaths of two other Afro-Caribbean patients: "big, black and dangerous?" (1993), one of the 1990s reports which looked at the experiences of young black men of African-Caribbean origin within the Criminal Justice System (CJS) and mental health services. Also known as 'The Prins Inquiry', it investigated the circumstances of Blackwood's death in August 1991 at Broadmoor Hospital, and was "clear" that service provision featured racism. In the report, Prins was highly critical of how the CJS and mental health services treated young black men, and incorporated the subtitle "big, black and dangerous", a phrase repeatedly and openly used by Broadmoor staff, to reflect the racist labelling that allowed young black men to be restrained rather than receive treatment.

The second was the Report of the Independent Panel of Inquiry into the Circumstances Surrounding the Absconsion of Mr. Holland From the Care of the Horizon NHS Trust on 19 August 1996. Horizon NHS Trust, published in 1997, and the third was the Report of the Independent Panel of Inquiry into the Care and Treatment of Sanjay Kumar Patel, Leicester Health Authority, published the following year.

== Other writing ==
In 1999, Mentally Disordered Offenders: Managing People Nobody Owns, edited by David Webb and Robert Harris, was compiled by his peers.

By 2007, he had written many articles in The Journal of Forensic Psychiatry & Psychology and several books. In 2008, he was made honorary professor of the University of Leicester.

Among high-profile cases he wrote about were Peter Sutcliffe and Harold Shipman.

Prins' 2013 publication, Psychopaths: an Introduction, was based on his huge experience and includes a quote by judge John Geoffrey Jones on classifying criminal deeds.

== Personal life ==
Herschel Prins was born in Finchley, north London in 1928, into a Jewish family, son of Louis Prins, a social worker, and Cissie (née Cohen). His parents died when he was a teenager, following which he was cared for by family. He left school at the age of 16 years. In 1958, he married Norma (née Cree). They had two children. Following retirement he continued lecturing as professor of forensic criminology at the university at Loughborough and as honorary professor at the University of Leicester. Prins died in 2016, five years after Norma's death.

== Selected publications ==
=== Articles ===
- Prins, Herschel A. (1983). "Diminished Responsibility and the Sutcliffe Case: Legal, Psychiatric and Social Aspects (A 'Layman's' View)". Medicine, Science and the Law. 23 (1): 17–24. doi:10.1177/002580248302300104. ISSN 0025-8024. PMID 6827941. S2CID 31739490.
- Prins, Herschel (1 July 1999). "'A Scandalous and Corrupt Hospital' — Reflections on the Fallon Report". Medicine, Science and the Law. 39 (3): 209–213. doi:10.1177/002580249903900304. ISSN 0025-8024. PMID 10466314. S2CID 8144916.

=== Books ===
- Dangerous behaviour, the law, and mental disorder. London: Tavistock Publications. 1986. ISBN 978-0-422-79220-2. OCLC 422885880.
- Bizarre behaviours. Routledge. 1990. ISBN 978-0-415-01835-7. OCLC 21077702.
- Fire-raising: its motivating and management. London: Routledge. 1994. ISBN 978-0-415-05984-8. OCLC 1158828746.
- Will they do it again? risk assessment and management in criminal justice and psychiatry. London: Routledge. 1999. ISBN 0-415-16018-9. OCLC 1261968733.
- Hitnahaguyot bizariyot (in Hebrew). Ḳiryat Byaliḳ: Aḥ. 2000. ISBN 978-965-267-194-3. OCLC 45726549. (Co-authored)
- Mad, Bad and Dangerous to Know: Reflections of a Forensic Practitioner. Waterside Press. 2010. ISBN 978-1-906534-83-7. OCLC 1118562610.
- Offenders, deviants or patients?. London: Routledge. 2010. ISBN 978-0-203-85487-7. OCLC 809732716.
- Psychopaths: an Introduction. Hook, Hampshire: Waterside Press. 2013. ISBN 978-1-908162-32-8. OCLC 843860811.

=== Reports ===
- Report of the Committee of Inquiry Into the Death in Broadmoor Hospital of Orville Blackwood, and a Review of the Deaths of Two Other Afro-Caribbean Patients: "Big, Black and Dangerous?". (1993)
- Prins, Herschel A; Marshall, Angela; Day, Kenneth (1997). Report of the Independent Inquiry into the circumstances surrounding the absconsion of Mr Holland from the care of Horizon NHS Trust on 29 August 1996 /Hershel Prins (Chairman), Angela Marshall, Kenneth Day. publisher not identified. OCLC 43198562.
