= One World: A Global Anthology of Short Stories =

2009 collection of short stories

- Cover of 2009 edition of One World: A Global Anthology
- Author: Various
- Cover artist: Victor Ehikhamenor
- Language: English
- Genre: Fiction
- Publisher: New Internationalist
- Publication date: 2009
- Publication place: United Kingdom
- Media type: Print (paperback)
- Pages: 192
- ISBN: 978-1906523138

One World: A Global Anthology of Short Stories is a collection of short stories, published in 2009 by New Internationalist. Edited by Chris Brazier, the book contains 23 short stories by 23 different authors who represent 14 different countries like Malaysia, Singapore, UK, Bangladesh, Nigeria, Pakistan, South Africa, Botswana, Myanmar, Cameroon, Greece, Zimbabwe, Kenya, India, and Australia and five continents. The collection was put together by Nigerian writers Ovo Adagha and Molara Wood, and includes stories by notable authors, such as Chimamanda Ngozi Adichie and Jhumpa Lahiri as well as many up-and-coming writers such as Petina Gappah, winner of the 2009 Guardi, Henrietta Rose-Innes (2008 Caine Prize-winner), Elaine Chiew, a recipient of the Bridport Prize, and Chika Unigwe, winner of the 2003 BBC Short Story Competition and a Commonwealth Short Story Competition award.

One World: A Global Anthology of Short Stories was launched at the 2009 Oxford Literary Festival held at Christ Church, Oxford. Proceeds are given to Médecins Sans Frontières (Doctors Without Borders).
