= Louis Quier Bowerbank =

British physician (1814–1880)

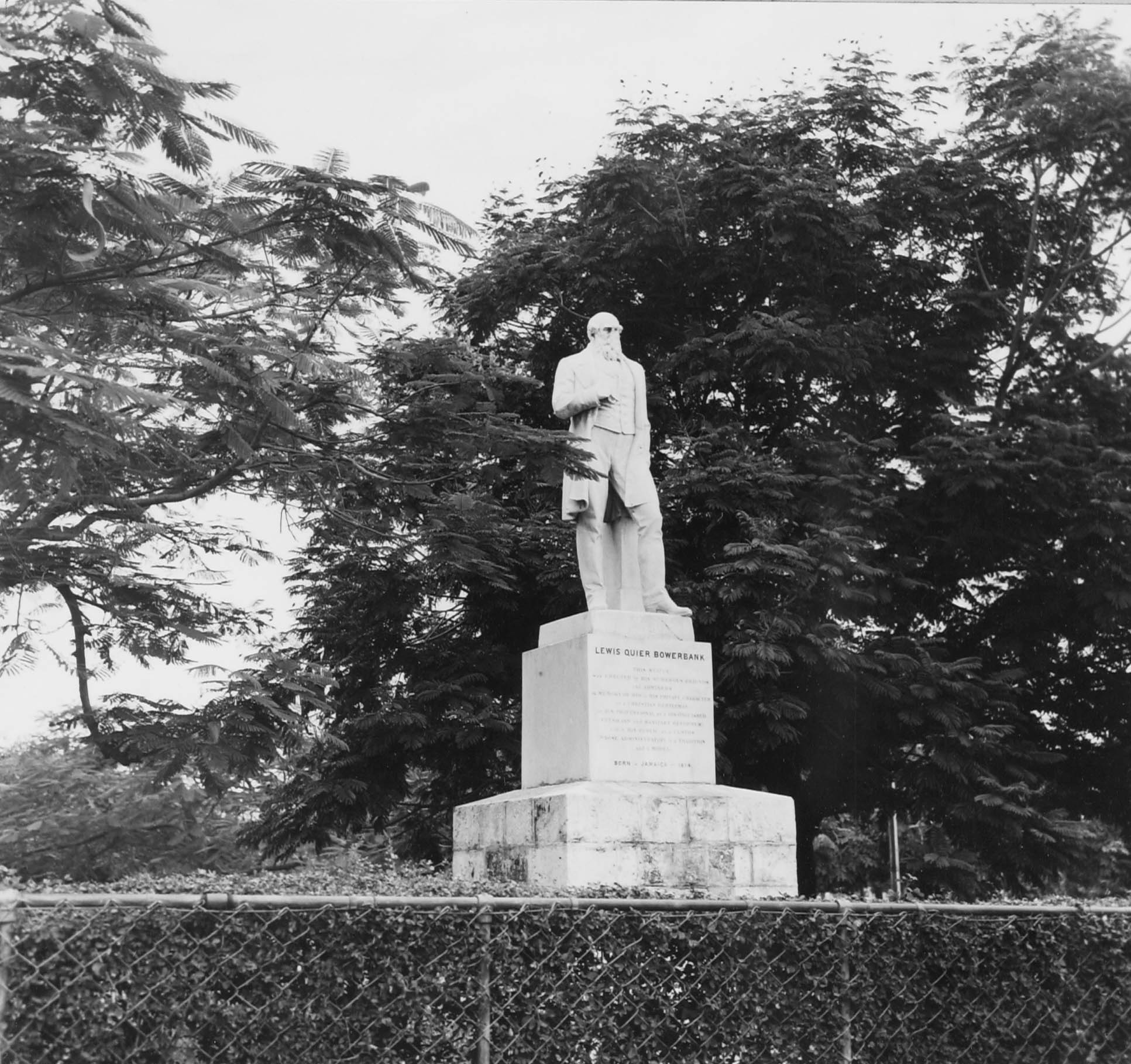
Statue of Lewis Quier Bowerbank, 1964

Louis Quier Bowerbank (26 August 1814 – 5 October 1880) was a British physician who, following his experiences of the Sam Sharpe Rebellion and then medical training in Scotland and England, contributed to the efforts to the building of the Lunatic Asylum, later named the Bellevue Hospital, in Jamaica. His statue stands opposite the hospital main entrance.

He died in Ealing, London in 1880.
