= The Journal of Forensic Psychiatry & Psychology =

- Discipline: Forensic psychology, forensic psychiatry
- Language: English
- Edited by: Jenny Shaw

Publication details
- Former name(s): The Journal of Forensic Psychiatry
- History: 1990-present
- Publisher: Routledge
- Frequency: Bimonthly
- Impact factor: 0.942 (2018)

Standard abbreviations
- ISO 4: J. Forensic Psychiatry Psychol.
- NLM: J Forens Psychiatry Psychol

Indexing
- ISSN: 1478-9949 (print); 1478-9957 (web)

Links
- Journal homepage; Online access

The Journal of Forensic Psychiatry & Psychology is a bimonthly peer-reviewed medical journal covering forensic psychiatry and psychology. It was established in 1990 as the Journal of Forensic Psychiatry, obtaining its current name in 2003. The editor-in-chief is Jenny Shaw (University of Manchester). According to the Journal Citation Reports, the journal had a 2018 impact factor of 0.942.
