= New Cross house fire =

Unsolved 1981 house fire that killed thirteen people in south-east London

Coordinates: 51.4757°N 0.0304°W

- Date: 18 January 1981; 45 years ago
- Location: New Cross Road, New Cross, south-east, London, United Kingdom
- Type: Fire
- Deaths: 13 (direct); 1 (suicide)

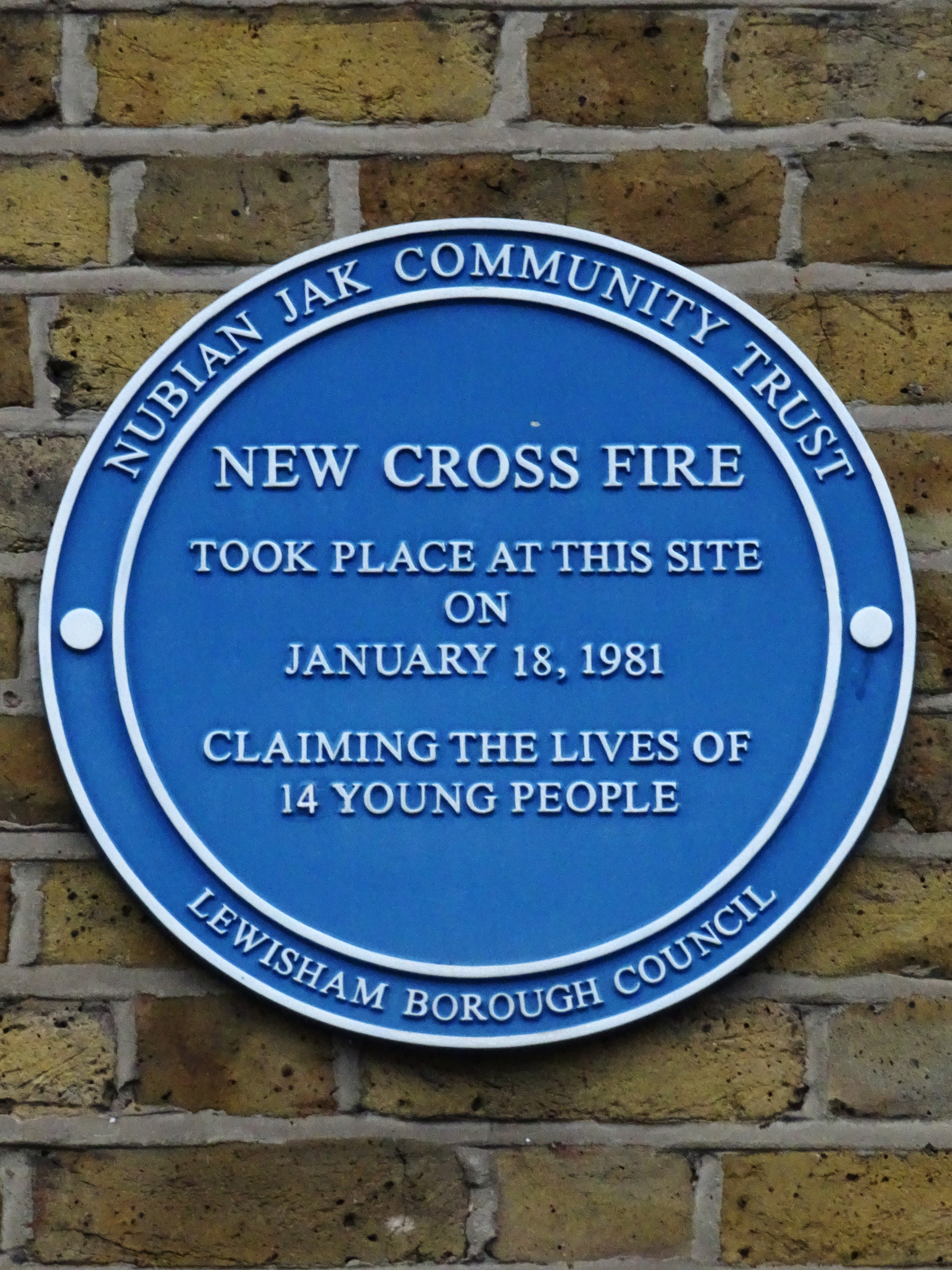
Blue plaque erected by Nubian Jak Community Trust at 439 New Cross Road, London SE14 6TA

The New Cross house fire was a fire that occurred during a party at a house in New Cross, south-east London, in the early hours of Sunday, 18 January 1981. The blaze killed 13 young black people aged between 14 and 22, and one survivor killed himself two years later.

No one has ever been charged in connection with the fire, which forensic science subsequently established started inside the house. Inquests into the deaths were held in 1981 and 2004. Both inquests recorded open verdicts. In the immediate aftermath of the fire, a New Cross Massacre Action Committee (NCMAC) was set up, chaired by John La Rose, which organised a "Black People's Day of Action" on 2 March 1981, when some 20,000 people marched over a period of eight hours through London, carrying placards that bore statements including: "13 Dead, Nothing Said".

== Fire ==
A forensic science report produced for the Metropolitan Police in 2011 ruled out a firebomb attack, finding instead that the fire had started when somebody in the house set fire to a foam-filled armchair in the front room of the property at 5:40 am on Sunday morning. There had been some early complaints from neighbours about excessive noise from the party. A white Leyland Princess car was seen driving away from the fire.

The party was a joint birthday celebration for Yvonne Ruddock (one of the victims of the fire) and Angela Jackson (who survived) and was held at No. 439, New Cross Road. It began on the evening of Saturday, 17 January 1981, and continued throughout the night and into the early hours of Sunday, 18 January.

== Victims ==
The victims of the fire were all young black British people between the ages of 14 and 22. They were:

- Andrew Gooding, age 14
- Rosaline Henry, age 16
- Patrick Cummings, age 16
- Patricia Johnson, age 15
- Owen Thompson, age 16
- Lloyd Hall, age 20
- Humphrey Brown, age 18
- Steve Collins, age 17
- Gerry Francis, age 17
- Peter Campbell, age 18
- Glenton Powell, age 16 (died in hospital)
- Yvonne Ruddock, age 16 (died in hospital)
- Paul Ruddock, age 22 (died in hospital)

Anthony Berbeck died two years after the fire at the age of 20, with many believing that he took his own life due to the trauma resulting from the fire.

== Inquests ==
Police also ruled out the theory that a fight had taken place. The inquest into the deaths of the 13 teenagers began on 21 April 1981. The initial police suspicion was that the party had been firebombed, either as a revenge attack or in an attempt to stop the noise; there was also an alternative theory that a fight had broken out, from which the blaze emanated. The jury returned an open verdict.

In 2002, a new action in the High Court led to an order for a second inquest, which was held in 2004. This second inquest also resulted in an open verdict. The coroner said that the fire was probably started deliberately by one of the guests, but as he could not be sure of this, he returned an open verdict.

== Aftermath ==
One week after the fire, on 25 January, a meeting was held at the Moonshot Club in New Cross, attended by more than one thousand people. The meeting concluded with a march to the scene of the fire and a demonstration there, which blocked New Cross Road for several hours. The New Cross Massacre Action Committee (NCMAC) was set up, chaired by John La Rose, and organised weekly meetings in New Cross, which saw increasing participation as the police investigation announced that there was no evidence of arson and that the fire was believed to be accidental.

Documents and papers related to the New Cross Massacre Action Committee's campaign are held in the archives of the George Padmore Institute and can be accessed by the public. The Black Power group Black Unity and Freedom Party (BUFP) published an account of what happened on the night of the fire in their journal, Black Voice.

The New Cross fire, described by Darcus Howe in 2011 as "the blaze we cannot forget", is significant as a turning point in the relationship between Black Britons, the police and the media, and marks an "intergenerational alliance to expose racism, injustices and the plight of black Britons".

=== Black People's Day of Action ===
The Action Committee organised a "Black People's Day of Action" on 2 March, when 20,000 people marched over a period of eight hours from Fordham Park to Hyde Park carrying placards that bore statements including: "Thirteen Dead, Nothing Said", "No Police Cover-Up" and "Blood Aga Run If Justice Na Come". One slogan read: "Dame Jill Knight Set The Fire Alight!"; an apparent reference to a controversial speech by Dame Jill Knight, a right-wing member of the ruling Conservative Party, which was widely interpreted as condoning or even encouraging "direct action" against noisy parties.

Tribune described the march as "the largest mass movement for racial justice on British soil at the time", but also noted that "journalists stationed in the offices of Fleet Street chanted monkey noises at the protestors down below."

== Memorials ==
On 14 January 2011, an event called "Remembering the New Cross Fire 30 Years On" was held at the Albany Theatre in Deptford. The event was hosted by Kwame Kwei-Armah and was an evening of spoken word, film, discussion and Lovers rock music. It featured contributions from Alex Pascall, Gus John, filmmaker Menelik Shabazz, novelist Courttia Newland and musicians Janet Kay and Carroll Thompson. Many of the victims' families and the survivors attended the event.

St. Andrew's Church in Brockley has a strong connection with the victims, as many of them attended the youth club there. In October 2002, Lewisham council installed a special stained-glass window at the church in their memory. On 16 January 2011, a memorial service was held there, with speakers including George Francis, chair of the New Cross Fire Parents' Committee, Lewisham Council leader Steve Bullock and Joan Ruddock, MP for Lewisham Deptford.

The victims were also commemorated in January 2011 with a blue plaque from Nubian Jak Community Trust. There is a stone memorial in Fordham Park, Deptford, listing those who died; facing the stone memorial is a bench with a memorial inscription. Both were installed in 2012.

There is also a memorial to the victims consisting of a park bench, plus 13 trees with a plaque at either end, on Hackney Downs in east London, and a memorial plaque on the wall of Catford Civic Hall listing the names of the "fourteen young people who died in the New Cross Fire of 18th January 1981". This was updated and refurbished in 2024.

In 2017, the 13 Dead, Nothing Said exhibition was hosted at Goldsmiths College, University of London. The exhibition shows photographs documenting the Black People's Day of Action, taken by Vron Ware, who had attended the march on 2 March 1981.

== Depiction in media ==
Blood Ah Go Run, a 1981 film by Menelik Shabazz, documents the response of the Black community to the fire.

The deaths in the fire were commemorated or mentioned in a number of reggae songs and poems at the time, including Johnny Osbourne's "13 Dead and Nothing Said", Benjamin Zephaniah's "13 Dead", Linton Kwesi Johnson's "New Crass Massakah" and UB40's "Don't Let It Pass You By". The events are referenced in The Young'uns song "These Hands" on the album Strangers, which won BBC Radio 2 Folk Awards "Best Album" 2018. Additionally, reggae producer Sir Collins, whose son Steve died in the fire, released a tribute album in memory of the victims.

Rex Obano's radio play Lover's Rock (BBC Radio 3, broadcast in November 2012) is a fictional account of the events leading up to the New Cross Fire. In March 2018, poet Jay Bernard's performance work investigating the fire, Surge: Side A, won the 2017 Ted Hughes Award for new poetry.

In 2020, a BBC Radio 4 documentary entitled "From the Ashes of New Cross", an episode in the series Lights Out, was broadcast to mark the 40th anniversary of the fire. The New Cross fire and the protests that followed are pivotal to the 2020 Steve McQueen drama Alex Wheatle, part of the filmmaker's Small Axe series for the BBC. The fire and the protests that followed were part of the Steve McQueen co-directed television documentary series Uprising shown on BBC One in July 2021.

== See also ==
- 1981 Brixton riot
