= International Journal of Social Psychiatry =

- Discipline: Psychiatry
- Language: English
- Edited by: Antonio Ventriglio

Publication details
- History: 1955-present
- Publisher: SAGE Publications
- Frequency: Bimonthly
- Impact factor: 2.7 (2025)

Standard abbreviations
- ISO 4: Int. J. Soc. Psychiatry

Indexing
- ISSN: 0020-7640 (print); 1741-2854 (web)
- LCCN: 65001277
- OCLC no.: 263589301

Links
- Journal homepage; Online access; Online archive

The International Journal of Social Psychiatry is a bimonthly peer-reviewed medical journal that covers research in the field of social psychiatry. The editor-in-chief is Antonio Ventriglio (University of Foggia, Italy). It was established in 1955 and is published by SAGE Publications.

== Abstracting and indexing ==
The journal is abstracted and indexed in: Academic Search Premier, Current Contents, Family Index Database, International Nursing Index, Index Medicus/MEDLINE/PubMed, Scopus, and the Social Sciences Citation Index. According to the Journal Citation Reports, the journal has a 2021 impact factor of 10.468.
