= National Association of Black Supplementary Schools =

Advice centre the United Kingdom.

The National Association of Black Supplementary Schools (NABSS) is a resource, information and advice centre for supplementary schools aimed at Black children and parents in the United Kingdom.

Supplementary schools for the children of Caribbean and African migrants in the UK were first set up in the 1970s to combat the impact of racism on the educational achievement of Black children. By 2013 there were around 50 Saturday schools in the UK for Black children. NABSS was formally established in 1987 as the National Association of Supplementary Schools (NASS), which in turn grew out of the Black Education Movement and Black Parents Movement that had been "active since the late 1960s to secure improvements in the education of Black children." Its first chairman was John La Rose, and it initially received funding from the Inner London Education Authority before that was shut down by Margaret Thatcher's Conservative government in 1989. The records of NASS are held at the George Padmore Institute.

Dr Kehinde Andrews, a Senior Lecturer in Sociology at Birmingham City University, has noted that there has been little research about the Black supplementary school system in the UK because "Most of the effort to overcome racism in education [have] focused on changes to mainstream schooling and policy. Andrews notes that "The biggest issue facing Black supplementary schools is the decline in attendance. Student numbers were at their peak from the late 1970s to the early 1990s." Andrews has published a book on the Black education movement in the UK, called Resisting racism: Race, inequality and the Black supplementary school movement (2013).

In 1997, Diane Reay and Heidi Safia Mirza also conducted a small-scale study of four Black supplementary schools, using a genealogical approach, which found "evidence of a female-centred new social movement" that challenged assumptions about Black, female, and working-class agency.

Activist Nia Imara has stated: "It is no secret that the education system is failing black children and there is little or no focus on black history and heritage." Rapper and social activist Akala recounted going to a Black Saturday school as a child in the 1980s in his book Natives, and credited the extra education in black history with helping to shape a positive identity for him as a teenager.

In 1996, Educator (Rosemary Campbell-Stephens MBE) was commissioned by Birmingham Partnership for Change (BPC) and the Supplementary School working group of BPC's Education Forum to undertake a small-scale review and evaluation of the then provision within the Supplementary School movement in Birmingham, UK. The Campbell report, A Review of Supplementary Schools in Birmingham 1996 was published by Birmingham Partnership for Change. the report identified eleven recommendations to empower, unite and develop the Saturday school movement in Birmingham.
