= Supplementary school =

Community-based school to supplement mainstream education

A supplementary school is a community-based initiative to provide additional educational support for children also attending mainstream schools. They are often geared to provide specific language, cultural and religious teaching for children from ethnic minorities.

== Supplementary schools by ethnicity ==
=== Black supplementary schools in the UK ===
A movement for Black supplementary schools started in Britain in the mid-1960s, first among the African-Caribbean communities, and then among other African communities. After a leaked report from the Inner London Education Authority revealed that children of West Indian immigrants were being labelled "Educationally Sub-Normal" (ESN), educationist Bernard Coard published his 1971 book How the West Indian Child is Made Educationally Sub-normal in the British School System, which led to parents setting up supplementary Saturday schools to support their children's education. The movement arose from the view that racism was holding children from African-Caribbean communities back, and the schools primarily addressed two issues: the provision of basic education, along with a specific cultural programme. The George Padmore Institute maintains an archive of material relating to this movement.

=== Japanese supplementary schools worldwide ===
Hoshū jugyō kō are Japanese supplementary schools in developed overseas countries supported by the Japanese Ministry of Education, Culture, Sports, Science and Technology.
