= John La Rose =

Trinidadian publisher, writer and poet, and political activist (1927–2006)

- Born: John Anthony La Rose; 27 December 1927; Arima, Trinidad and Tobago
- Died: 28 February 2006 (aged 78); London, England
- Education: St. Mary's College
- Occupations: Political and cultural activist poet, writer, publisher
- Known for: Founder of New Beacon Books (1966–his death); founding chair of George Padmore Institute
- Spouse(s): Irma Hilaire (first wife, m. 1954), Sarah White (partner)
- Children: 3

John La Rose (27 December 1927 – 28 February 2006) was a political and cultural activist, poet, writer, publisher, founder in 1966 of New Beacon Books, the first specialist Caribbean publishing company in Britain, and subsequently Chairman of the George Padmore Institute, founded in 1991. He was originally from Trinidad and Tobago but was involved in the struggle for political independence and cultural and social change in the Caribbean in the 1940s and 1950s and later in Britain, the rest of Europe and the Third World.

== Biography ==
=== Early life in the Caribbean: 1927–60 ===
John Anthony La Rose was born in Arima, Trinidad and Tobago, in 1927, the younger son of Ferdinand La Rose, a cocoa trader, and his teacher wife Emily. He had four sisters and a brother. La Rose attended the local Roman Catholic school, and at the age of nine won a scholarship to St. Mary's College, Port of Spain. After finishing school, he taught at St. Mary's and went on to become a leading insurance executive in Colonial Life, which was then in the process of becoming the biggest insurance company in the Caribbean. He later lived and taught in secondary schools in Venezuela, before coming to Britain in 1961.

His interest in culture – so-called serious music, literature and folk language and proverbs – preceded his commitment to politics and trade unionism. He saw these and cultural activity as interrelated in a vision of change. He wrote in his statement "About New Beacon Review" that his conception aimed "at the expression of the radical and the revolutionary. More easily definable in politics, and more complex and less easily definable, or indefinable, in the arts and culture". As an executive member of the Youth Council he produced their fortnightly radio programme Voice of Youth on Radio Trinidad; and in the mid-1950s, he co-authored with the calypsonian Raymond Quevedo – Atilla the Hun – the first serious study of the calypso, originally entitled Kaiso, A Review, republished as Atilla's Kaiso in 1983.

La Rose helped to form the Workers Freedom Movement (WFM) in the 1940s and was editor of the few published copies of their journal Freedom. He became an executive member of the Federated Workers Trade Union (eventually merged in the National Union of Government and Federated Workers), and later General Secretary of the West Indian Independence Party, which was formed out of the merger of the WFM with active trade unionists. He was involved with the struggle within the Oilfields Workers' Trade Union (OWTU) by the "Rebels" for a radical, democratic and more representative trade unions, for one member one vote in regular periodical elections by secret ballot. The "Rebel" candidates won the elections in 1962 and he retained his close links with the OWTU and the international trade union movement, serving as the European representative of the OWTU from the 1960s until his death in 2006.

=== Life and work in Britain: 1961–2006 ===
La Rose moved to Britain in 1961, making his home in London, while maintaining his close links with the Caribbean.

In August 1966, together with his partner Sarah White, he started New Beacon Books, the first specialist Caribbean publishers, booksellers and international bookservice. In December 1966, he was part of a meeting in London with Edward Kamau Brathwaite and Andrew Salkey from which came the formation of the influential Caribbean Artists Movement (CAM). La Rose was chairman of the Institute of Race Relations (IRR) in 1972/73, the period when the IRR was establishing its independence, and was also chairman of Towards Racial Justice, which was the vehicle for publishing the campaigning journal Race Today.

From the mid-1960s La Rose became closely involved in the Black Education Movement, including the fight against Banding, and against the wrongful placing of West Indian children in schools for the Educationally Sub-normal. In 1969, he established the George Padmore Supplementary School, one of the first of its kind, and helped to found the Caribbean Education and Community Workers Association, which published Bernard Coard's How The West Indian Child Is Made Educationally Sub-normal in the British School System (1971). In the 1980s, La Rose helped to set up the National Association of Supplementary Schools and was its chairman for two years.

In 1966, he was a founder member of the Vietnam Solidarity Campaign and a national council member of this important anti-war movement.

He co-produced and scripted the documentary film The Mangrove Nine (1973), about the resistance to police attacks on the popular Mangrove restaurant in the early 1970s, with the film director Franco Rosso. La Rose produced a short film on the Black Church in Britain as part of a Full House BBC 2 television programme on the Caribbean arts in 1973.

In 1975, he co-founded the Black Parents Movement from the core of the parents involved in the George Padmore Supplementary School after an incident in which a young black schoolboy was beaten up by the police outside his school in the London Borough of Haringey.

The Black Parents Movement subsequently formed an alliance with the Black Youth Movement and the Race Today Collective, which had, with the Race Today journal, by then separated from the IRR. Together they established a formidable cultural and political movement, successfully fighting many cases against police oppression and arbitrariness and for better state education. It was the Alliance that formed the New Cross Massacre Action Committee in response to the alleged arson attack which resulted in the death of 14 young blacks, and mobilised 20,000 black people and their supporters on 2 March 1981 – known as the Black People's Day of Action – to protest the death of the young people and the failure of the police to conduct a proper investigation. La Rose was Chairman of the New Cross Massacre Action Committee.

In 1982, he was instrumental in the founding of Africa Solidarity, in support of those struggling against dictatorial governments and tyranny in Africa. That year, he also became Chairman of the Committee for the Release of Political Prisoners in Kenya, whose founding members included the Kenyan novelist and critic Ngũgĩ wa Thiong'o.

One of La Rose's greatest achievements was the International Book Fair of Radical Black and Third World Books (1982–95) organised originally jointly with Bogle-L'Ouverture Books and Race Today Publications. He was joint director with Bogle-L'Ouverture's Jessica Huntley of the Book Fair at its inception. After the withdrawal of Bogle-L'Ouverture from the organising committee, he became its sole director.

Held in the UK, London and other parts of the country, the Book Fairs and Book Fair Festivals brought together people from across the globe to participate in debates, forums, readings, musical events, films, plays and other cultural productions, as well as to browse through stalls from a multiplicity of publishers. They celebrated the cultural and political achievements, addressed key issues of the times, and mirrored the achievements of black people throughout the world.

In response to concerns about the rise in fascism and xenophobia, La Rose helped to found European Action for Racial Equality and Social Justice in 1989, bringing together anti-racists and anti-fascists from Belgium, Italy, France and Germany.

La Rose was editor-in-chief of New Beacon Books until his death in 2006. He edited the occasional journal New Beacon Review (1968, 1985, 1986) and co-edited with Andrew Salkey the special issue of the magazine Savacou (Nos. 9/10, 1974) that provided a comprehensive anthology of black writing in Britain during the period of the Caribbean Artists Movement. La Rose published his first collection of poems, Foundations, in 1966 and his second collection, Eyelets of Truth Within Me, in 1992 (both published by New Beacon Books). His poems and essays have been widely anthologised, and his journalism was published regularly in Race Today. He co-authored Kaiso Calypso Music: David Rudder in Conversation with John La Rose in 1990.

In 1991, La Rose, together with a number of colleagues, founded the George Padmore Institute (GPI), a library, archive and educational research centre housing materials relating to the life experiences of Caribbean, African and Asian communities in Britain. The aims and objectives of the Institute are to organise: a library, educational resource and research centre, that will allow the materials in its care to be available for use by interested individuals and groups, both in person at the Institute and through the use of modern storage, retrieval and communication methods; educational and cultural activities, including conferences, courses, seminars, talks and readings; the publication of relevant materials. He was the Chairman of the George Padmore Institute from its inception until his death in 2006.

The novelist, playwright and critic Ngũgĩ wa Thiong'o, when introducing La Rose's talk on "The Politics of Culture: Writing and Publishing Today", which Ngũgĩ organised as the Borough of Islington's Writer in Residence in London in May 1985, stated:

"John La Rose is immensely aware of the revolutionary potential of literature and culture in the world today. As a writer, publisher and cultural activist, he has helped in the growth of many writers in Africa, Caribbean, Europe and America. Rarely has anybody come into contact with him without being affected by his generous, searching, modern renaissance spirit."

== Personal life ==
In 1954, La Rose married his first wife Irma La Rose (née Hilaire, who had been born in Maracaibo, Venezuela, in 1930). They had two sons, Michael and Keith.

La Rose had another son, Wole La Rose, with Sarah Swinburne White, his long-time partner and co-founder of New Beacon Books.

Irma La Rose died in 2019. Sarah White, died in 2022.

== Selected bibliography ==
=== Poetry ===
- Foundations (1966), New Beacon Books
- Eyelets of Truth Within Me (1992), New Beacon Books. ISBN 1-873201-05-2

=== Journals ===
- New Beacon Review (1968, 1985, 1986) – editor

=== Essays ===
- "Life experience with Britain". Chronicle World. Archived from the original (web) on 3 October 2006.
- "Social exclusion and cultural creativity". Chronicle World. Archived from the original (web) on 20 February 2005.
- Unending Journey: Selected Writings (Introduction by Linton Kwesi Johnson; 2014), New Beacon Books, ISBN 978-1-873201-29-9

== Obituaries and tributes ==
- Alleyne, Brian (Autumn 2007). "John La Rose (1927–2006)". History Workshop Journal. 64 (1): 460–466. doi:10.1093/hwj/dbm063.
- Bourne, Jenny (1 March 2006). "John La Rose 1927–2006". Independent Race and Refugee News Network. Institute of Race Relations. Archived from the original (web) on 22 February 2007.
- Busby, Margaret (March 2006). "John La Rose - publisher, poet, cultural activist". Publishing News – via LinkedIn.
- Busby, Margaret (November 2006). "Obituary: John La Rose", Wasafiri, Vol. 21, No. 3, pp. 65–67. DOI: 10.1080/02690050600918433.
- Hutchinson, Shaun, "A Black British Icon", The New Black Magazine.
- John, Gus (22 April 2006). "John La Rose". The Independent. Independent News and Media Limited. Archived from the original (web and print) on 1 October 2007.
- Johnson, Linton Kwesi (4 March 2006). "John La Rose" (web and print). The Guardian. Guardian News and Media Limited.
- Lee, Simon (May–June 2006). "John La Rose: intellectual beacon". Caribbean Beat (79).
- Le Gendre, Kevin (18 February 2007). "The legacy of John La Rose: Respect for the dubfather". The Independent.
- Ramdeen, Leela (16 March 2006). "Tribute to elder statesman". The Trinidad Guardian. Archived from the original on 26 September 2007.
- Word Power Books (2 March 2006). "John La Rose (1927–2006): A Tribute". Word Power Books, Edinburgh, Scotland, UK. Archived from the original (web) on 29 November 2006.

== Legacy ==
John La Rose is the subject of the 2003 documentary film Dream to Change the World — A Tribute to John La Rose, directed by Horace Ové and edited by Pete Stern.

The John La Rose Short Story Competition took place as part of the international conference "On Whose Terms? Critical Negotiations in Black British Literature and the Arts" organised by Goldsmiths College London in March 2008. Judged by R. Victoria Arana, Margaret Busby, Courttia Newland and Kadija Sesay, the competition was won by Molara Wood with her story "Written in Stone".

In 2011, BBC Radio 4 broadcast the programme What We Leave We Carry: The Legacy of John La Rose, presented by Burt Caesar, with contributions by Sarah White, Linton Kwesi Johnson, Margaret Busby, Susan Craig-Jones and Gus John.

The John La Rose Memorial Lectures comprised a series of three held since 2010, when the first lecture was given by David Abdulah, speaking on "Politics and People's Power after Obama". In 2011, Jayne Cortez spoke on "The Changing Nature of Black Cultural Politics", and Ngugi wa Thiong'o delivered the third lecture in 2013.

In 2013, La Rose was the posthumous recipient, together with Sarah White, of the Henry Swanzy Award for Distinguished Service to Caribbean Letters presented by the NGC Bocas Lit Fest as a "lifetime achievement award to recognise service to Caribbean literature by editors, publishers, critics, broadcasters, and others".

The exhibition Dream to Change the World: The Life & Legacy of John La Rose took place at Islington Museum from 22 May to 29 August 2015. A number of associated public events and workshops for schools were held during the course of the exhibition.

In December 2022, a decision was reached to change the name of Black Boy Lane in West Green, London, to "La Rose Lane", following two years of consultation by Haringey Council with local residents.
