= Educationally subnormal =

20th century British term for some children

Educationally subnormal was a term used historically in the United Kingdom to refer to children with very limited intellectual abilities. Throughout much of the 20th century, British education policy focused on separating these children from the wider school population and they were often viewed as being incapable of meaningful improvement. Children placed in this category were disproportionately boys, from less wealthy households and immigrant families.

The term "mentally defective" was used in the early 20th century to refer to children and adults with intellectual disabilities. Beginning in the 1910s, children deemed to be in this category began to be formally classified as such and were taken into the custody of the state if their home environment was believed to be unsuitable. Separate schools were also established for "mentally defective" children who remained in the custody of their parents. Following World War II, these children began to be formally known as "educationally subnormal", and teachers became responsible for recommending them for separate schools. As attitudes towards them changed, the term was taken out of usage in 1981 and attempts were made to integrate them into mainstream schools as much as possible.

== History ==
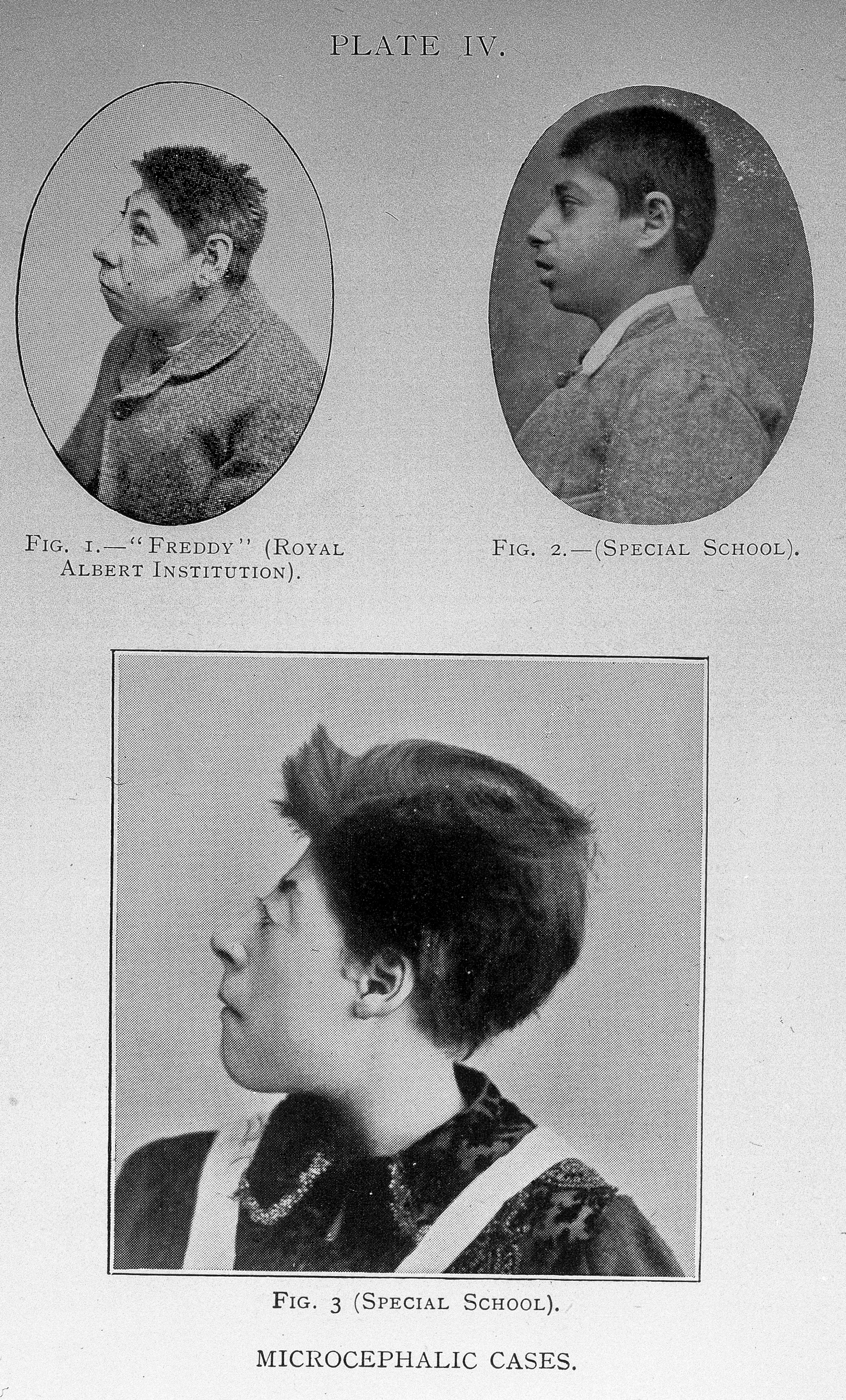
Photographs of children with microcephaly from Mentally Deficient Children: Their Treatment and Training (1922)

The Mental Deficiency Act 1913 required local authorities to identify children deemed "mentally defective" and unfit for school. They would then be provided with institutionalised care if necessary. This decision was, to a significant extent, based on whether children were believed to be neglected, which meant that those who were institutionalised were often from poorer households with limited resources. Children from wealthier homes were more likely to attend Educational Sub-Normality (ESN) schools. By 1955, 141,164 people were covered by the act, most of whom had been registered in childhood. This time period saw a growth in the study of child development and child psychiatry. But children who had scored poorly in intelligence tests or were deemed otherwise "defective" were often assumed to be beyond help, and interest in them was limited.

Around the time of World War II, the growth of child diagnoses with various psychiatric disorders provided a new way to see children with difficulties. These new ideas were controversial, however, and the war drew resources away from their further exploration. The 1940s saw new understanding develop of the adverse effects of familial separation on children, though this was largely not extended to children deemed "mentally deficient". The term "educationally subnormal" was formally introduced with the Education Act 1944 in England and Wales. In the postwar years, primary and secondary schoolteachers were responsible for recommending children to ESN schools. The term was also used over a similar time period in Scotland and Northern Ireland. Following the Mental Health Act 1959, the phrase "mental deficient" was discontinued as a legal term, and institutions for children in that category were closed. The number of children enrolled at ESN schools increased rapidly in the twenty years after World War II. For instance, between 1953 and 1962, the number of pupils in England and Wales increased from 19,000 to 36,000, albeit largely at day rather than residential schools.

During the 1950s, 1960s and 1970s, the amount of scientific interest and public debate related to children with intellectual disabilities increased. There were also objections among immigrant and ethnic minority parents that their children were disproportionately sent to ESN schools. A 1978 report recommended replacing the term "educationally subnormal" with "special educational needs", and including children who fell into that category in mainstream schools as much as possible. These proposals were put into law by the 1981 Education Act.

== ESN schools ==
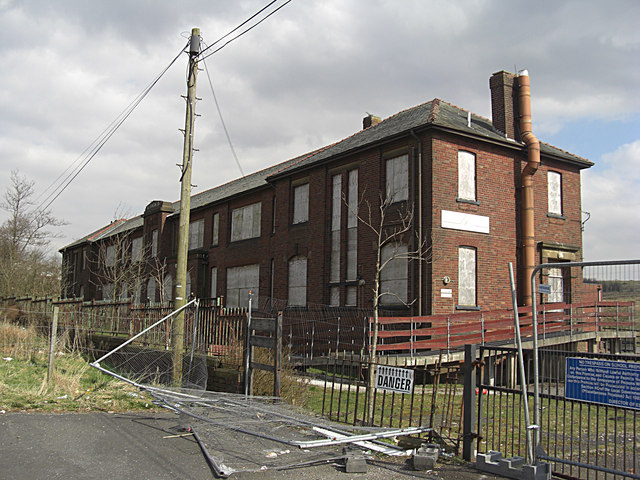
Disused building formally of Hill Top Special School (2009)

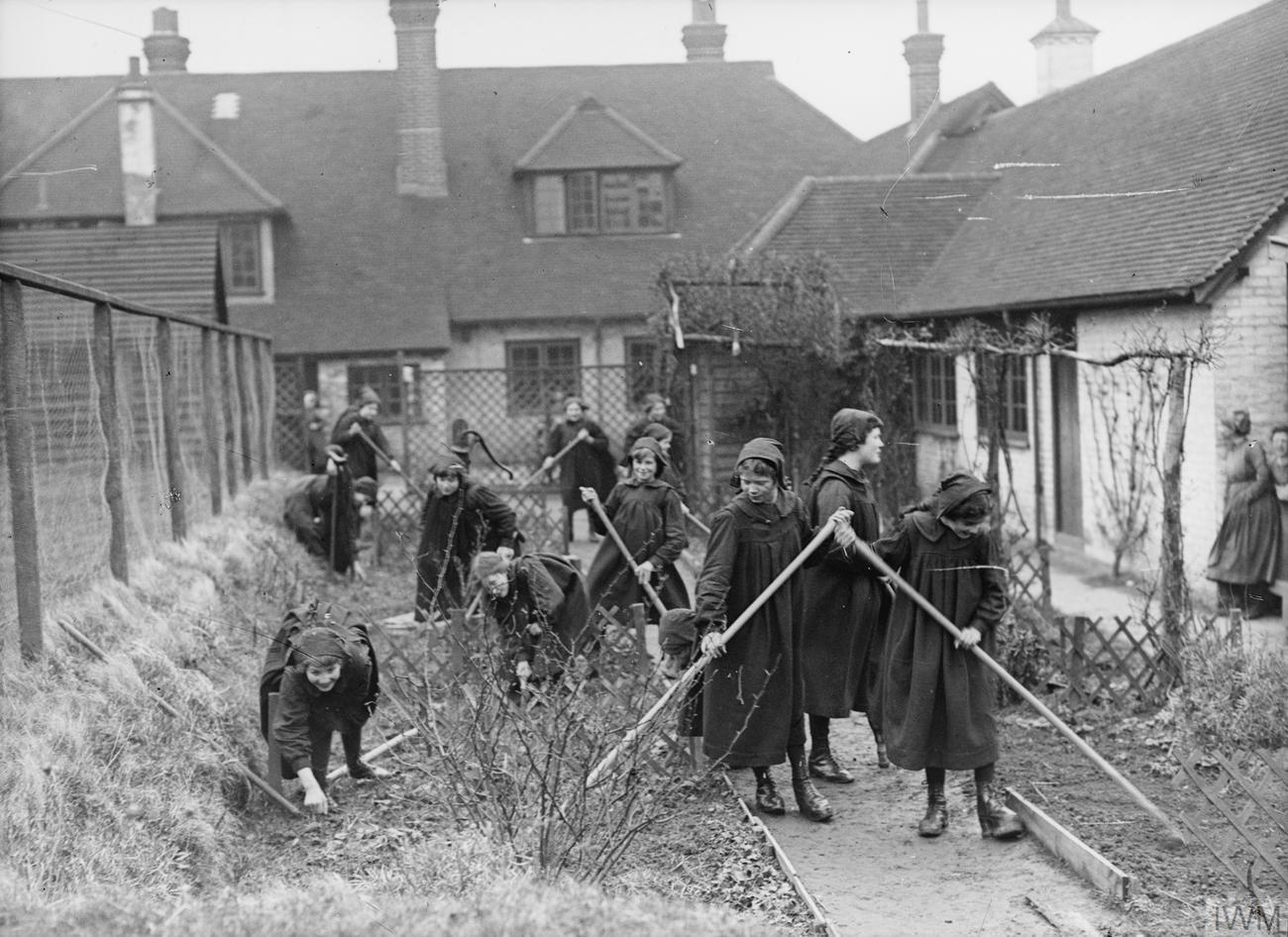
Girls suffering from air-raid related Post-traumatic stress disorder garden at Llangattock School of Arts and Crafts for disabled children during World War I

A 1950 academic paper described conditions at a residential ESN school. It stated that the school was located in a settlement for adult "mental defectives", but that the children were usually kept apart from the adults. The children lived in "homes" run by trained nurses of their sex and attended school for five days a week. During term time, they typically spent all their time at school, in its playing fields or in their school-run homes. They were sent to their family homes at Christmas and in the summer, if one was "available and suitable". Older boys were also given opportunities for autonomy, such as participating in games against outside groups or spending time and having jobs outside of school. Such experiences were withheld from girls in order to prevent "sexual misbehaviour".

Later, anecdotal evidence suggests that many ESN schools taught a limited curriculum focused on games and artistic activities, with very little academic work. According to a BBC report, whilst there were some examples of ESN schools providing good quality education, many children had their needs neglected.

== Demographics ==
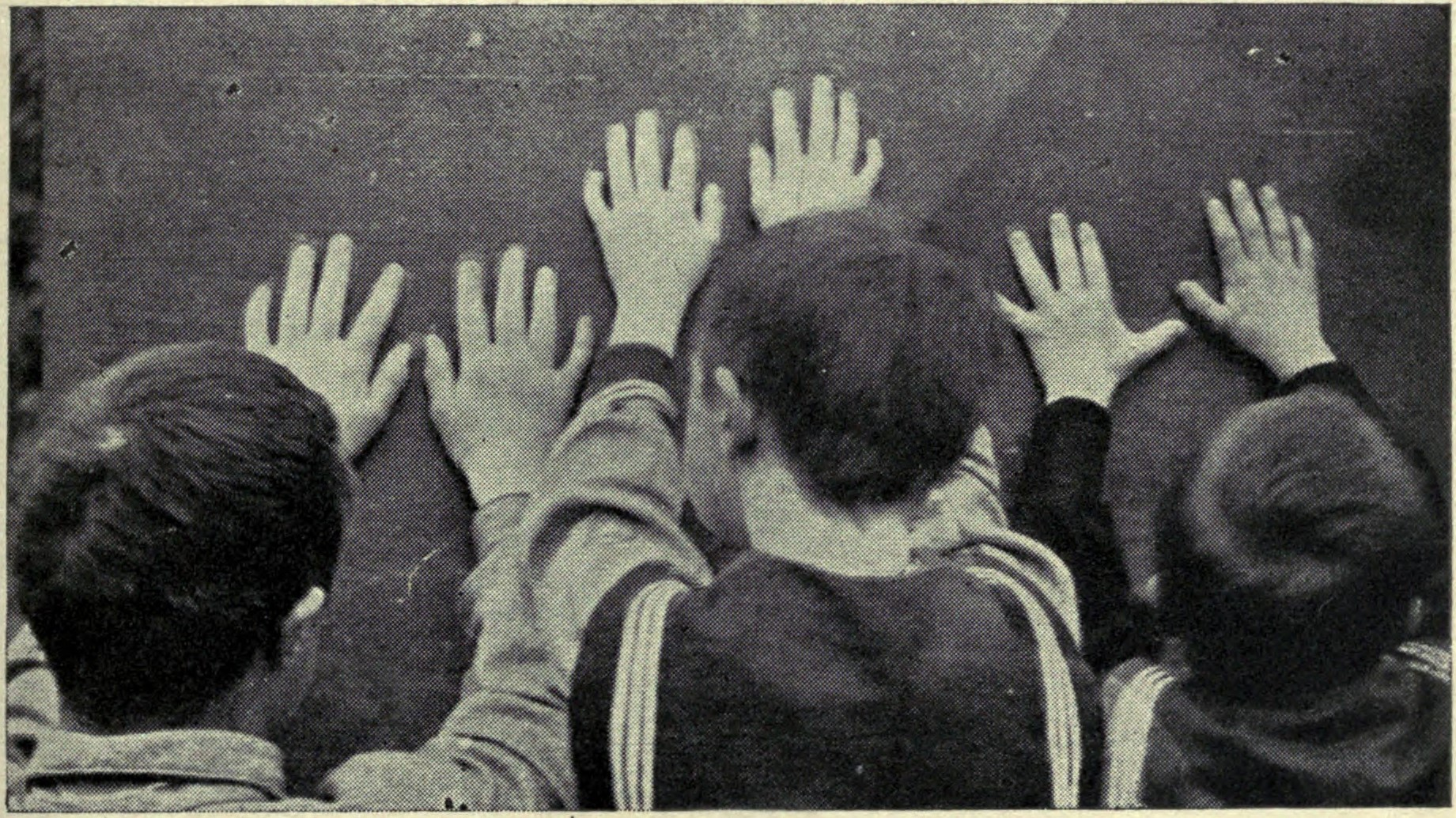
Photograph of boys with Down syndrome intended to illustrate the shape of their hands from Mentally Deficient Children: Their Treatment and Training (1916)

From the 1910s to the 1950s, the population of children deemed "mentally defective" was divided into two categories. Children from poorer households or unstable family situations were more likely to be institutionalised, though children from wealthier households were more likely to attend ESN schools whilst remaining in the custody of their parents. A 1950 report commented on the children attending a residential school:

The fact of institutionalization indicates that many of these children were maladjusted, which necessitated regular supervision. Many of the children were delinquent or presented serious behaviour difficulties at home. Others are orphans, illegitimate or come from broken homes, and the residential special school acts as a place of custody. All children are educable, and majority leave at the age of 16 for employment under ordinary conditions.

Later in 1962, a study examined a random sample of children deemed educationally subnormal in South Wales. The study noted that the children were 61% boys and 39% girls. The boys were disproportionately born later in the academic year, and especially in the summer months. The children were also disproportionately from less wealthy households. They appeared to be less likely to be firstborns than the general population. A significant minority of children had difficulties with their speech and sight, whilst almost half were deemed maladjusted.

=== Ethnic minority and immigrant children ===
A 1967 report by the Inner London Education Authority found 28% of children in London ESN schools were black immigrant children, in comparison to 15% of the mainstream school population. During the 1960s and 1970s, black children generally underperformed white children at school, which fed into a common belief that black people were inherently intellectually inferior. This meant that teachers frequently feared that black children would depress the performance of their class. The needs of immigrant children from the Caribbean in particular were often neglected. These children frequently came to the UK after their parents, so were adjusting to life in a new environment in the care of virtual strangers they had not seen in years. They usually previously spoke Jamaican English, but were not given the support in adjusting to a new dialect which they would have received had they spoken a different language.

== Further developments ==
In 2025, Labour MP Kim Johnson called for an inquiry to be held into this policy.
