= New Beacon Books =

British publishing house and bookshop (founded 1966)

Coordinates: 51.5680°N 0.1096°W

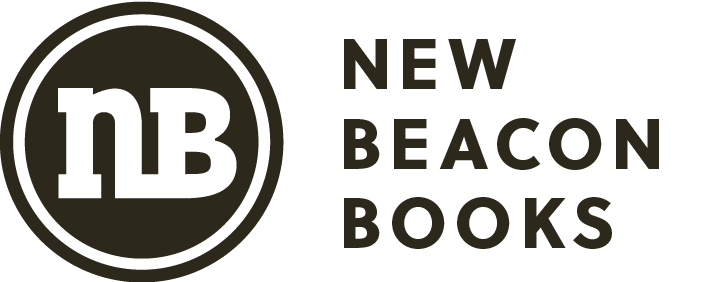
- Status: Open Tuesday-Saturday 11am - 6pm (Thursday 11am - 8pm)
- Founded: 1966; 60 years ago
- Founders: John La Rose (1927–2006), Sarah Swinburne White (1941–2022)
- Country of origin: United Kingdom
- Headquarters location: 76 Stroud Green Road; London, N4 3EN
- Nonfiction topics: Black culture; Black British, Caribbean, African, African-American and Asian literature
- Official website: newbeaconbooks.com

New Beacon Books is a British publishing house, bookshop, and international book service that specializes in Black British, Caribbean, African, African-American and Asian literature. Founded in 1966 by John La Rose and Sarah White, it was the first Caribbean publishing house in England. New Beacon Books is widely recognized, as having played an important role in the Caribbean Artists Movement, and in Black British culture more generally. The associated George Padmore Institute (GPI) is located on the upper floors of the same building where the bookshop resides at 76 Stroud Green Road, Finsbury Park, London.

== History ==
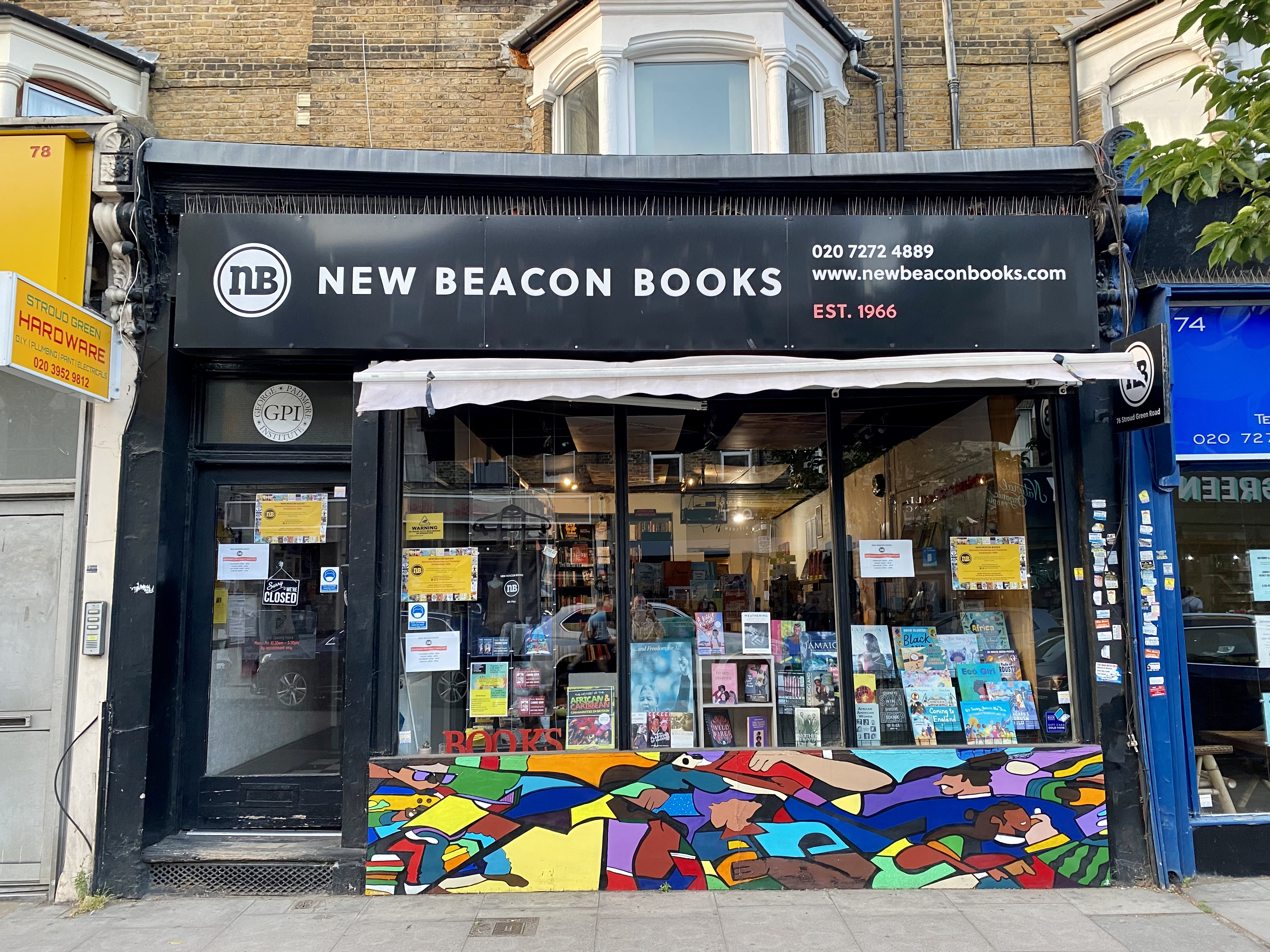
New Beacon Books in June 2023

New Beacon Books started out as a publishing house that was run out of the Hornsey, North London, flat of John La Rose and Sarah White. It was named after the Trinidadian journal The Beacon, which was published between 1931 and 1932. In 1967, La Rose and White moved New Beacon Books to new premises, in Finsbury Park, where the company also began to function as a specialist bookstore, based since 1973 at 76 Stroud Green Road. Early publications included La Rose's first poetry collection, Foundations (1966), Tradition, the Writer and Society: Critical Essays by Wilson Harris (1967), and a new edition of John Jacob Thomas's 1889 polemic, Froudacity (1969).

Other notable works published by New Beacon Books include: Edward Kamau Brathwaite's History of the Voice: The Development of Nation Language in the Anglophone Caribbean (1984); Erna Brodber's novels Jane and Louisa Will Soon Come Home (1980) and Myal (1988); Martin Carter's Poems of Succession (1977); Bernard Coard's How the West Indian Child is Made Educationally Sub-normal in the British School System (1971); Lorna Goodison's I am Becoming my Mother (1986); Mervyn Morris, The Pond (1973) and Shadowboxing (1979); and Andrew Salkey's A Quality of Violence (1978).

The 50th anniversary of New Beacon was celebrated with a series of events held during the latter part of 2016, including an International Poetry Night on 3 December, with internationally acclaimed poet and GPI trustee Linton Kwesi Johnson, at the British Library.

== Commercial viability ==
In late 2016, the directors of the bookshop decided to close it down on the grounds that it was no longer economically viable. A particular problem was that it lacked a functional website, and was losing its specialist niche to online booksellers. The physical setup had not essentially changed since the 1980s. The shop's imminent closure was announced at the 50th-anniversary celebrations in December 2016.

However, in early 2017 a volunteer New Beacon Development Group swiftly reopened the shop with reduced hours and set about gathering support. Crowdfunding raised £11,248, which helped the shop to undertake a major refurbishment and create a website, permitting online browsing and shopping. The renovations were completed in August 2017 and normal hours were reestablished, with a re-launch taking place in October 2017.

In December 2021 New Beacon Books announced a move to online-only sales, but after raising money through another crowdfunding campaign, with the original stated target being reached within 24 hours, the bookshop announced it would be able to keep its physical location open. The directors were reported as stating: "For the foreseeable future, New Beacon Books will continue to be based at its current premises. We will be continuing to look at ways for a long-term sustainable future."

== See also ==
- George Padmore Institute
- International Book Fair of Radical Black and Third World Books
- Bogle-L'Ouverture Publications
