= Zheng (surname) =

- Romanisation: Zheng, Tcheng (Mandarin); Cheng (Yue Chinese); Tay, Tee, Teh, The, Ty (Hokkien and Teochew)
- Pronunciation: Zhèng (Mandarin Pinyin); Zeng6 (Cantonese Jyutping); Tēⁿ (Hokkien and Teochew Pe̍h-ōe-jī); Dâng (Hokchew Bàng-uâ-cê)
- Language: Chinese

Origin
- Meaning: Name of an ancient state in Henan province
- Region of origin: Henan

Other names
- Cognates: Chung, Jung, Jeong (Korean); Saetae, Te-, Techa- (Thai); Trịnh (Vietnamese)

Zheng (simplified Chinese: 郑; traditional Chinese: 鄭; pinyin: Zhèng; Wade–Giles: Cheng⁴, [ʈʂə́ŋ]) is a Chinese surname. It is the 7th name on the Hundred Family Surnames poem. In 2006, Zheng ranked 21st in China's list of top 100 most common surnames. Zheng belongs to the second major group of ten surnames which makes up more than 10% of the Chinese population. Zheng was a major surname of the rich and powerful during China's Tang dynasty.

In Republic of China (Taiwan) and Hong Kong, the name is normally romanized as Cheng or Tcheng (occasionally romanized as Chang in Hong Kong although that variant is more commonly used for another Chinese name, Zhang). In Malaysia, Cheng is commonly romanized as Cheng, Cheang, Chang, Tay, Tee and Teh. It is spelled as Tay in Singapore, The in Indonesia, and Ty in Philippines, from the Hakka, Hokkien and Teochew pronunciation of the character. It is also romanized as Dang from Hokchew.

The surname also has taken form outside of Chinese societies: in Korean, the name is written 정 and transliterated as Jeong, Jung, or Chung. It is the fifth most common Korean surname (after Kim, Lee, Park, and Choi), with about 4.85% of the South Korean population (2,230,611 people) having this name.

== Origin ==
The Zheng surname originated in Henan. In 806 BC, King Xuan, the penultimate king of the Western Zhou dynasty, enfeoffed his younger brother Prince You, who became posthumously known as Duke Huan of Zheng, at Zheng (present-day Hua County, Shaanxi). Duke Huan was killed along with King You of Zhou when the Quanrong tribes sacked the Zhou capital Haojing in 771 BC. Duke Huan was succeeded by his son Duke Wu, who helped King Ping of Zhou establish the Eastern Zhou dynasty in Luoyang, and his feudal state of Zheng was also moved east to present-day Henan. His descendants and many people of the state later adopted Zheng as their surname.

The city of Xingyang is considered as the origin place of the people whose surname is Zheng. Today, Xingyang is under the administration of the prefecture-level city of Zhengzhou (鄭州) which translates to "Settlement of Zheng". Zhengzhou is the capital of Henan province and is located within the boundaries of the ancient state of Zheng (state). There is also another city called Xinzheng ("New Zheng"), also under the administration of Zhengzhou.

The Zheng clan character (鄭) is featured prominently on the flag of the short-lived rebel Kingdom of Tungning founded by Ming-loyalist Koxinga (who had the surname Zheng) in Taiwan. Also called the Kingdom of Formosa.

During the Tang dynasty the Li family of Zhaojun 趙郡李氏, the Cui family of Boling 博陵崔氏, the Cui family of Qinghe 清河崔氏, the Lu family of Fanyang 范陽盧氏, the Zheng family of Xingyang 荥陽鄭氏, the Wang family of Taiyuan 太原王氏, and the Li family of Longxi 隴西李氏 were the seven noble families between whom marriage was banned by law. The marriages between the families were performed clandestinely after the prohibition was implemented on the seven families by Emperor Gaozong. Their status as "Seven Great surnames" became known during Gaozong's rule.

== Distribution ==
Of the top 30 cities in China, 郑 ranked 4th most common surname in the city of Fuzhou.

== Spelling and pronunciation ==
Chinese		Mandarin (Hanyu Pinyin)	Hakka	Cantonese (Jyutping)	Hokkien (Pe̍h-ōe-jī)	Hokchew (Bàng-uâ-cê)
Trad.	Simp.	Mandarin (Hanyu Pinyin)	Hakka	Cantonese (Jyutping)	Hokkien (Pe̍h-ōe-jī)	Hokchew (Bàng-uâ-cê)
鄭	郑	Zhèng	Meixian: cang^{52} Huiyang: cang^{53} Fengshun: chang^{31} Wuhua: qang^{31} Songkou: cang^{52} Yingde: qang^{31} Sixian: cang^{55} Hailu: chang^{33} Dabu: chang^{53} Raoping: chang^{24} Zhao'an: chang^{55} Hong Kong: cang^{55}	zeng6	Tēⁿ / Tīⁿ	Dâng

== Notable people ==
There are over 400 Zhengs listed in the Who's Who in Chinese History.

=== Royalty ===
- Zheng Yong, Chinese merchant and the father of King Taksin
- Zheng Taksin (1734–1782), King of Thonburi Kingdom
- Zheng Chui (?–1782), son of King Taksin and Viceroy of Siam
- Zheng Noi (1776–1838), son of King Taksin and Governor of Nakhon Si Thammarat
- Empress Dowager Zheng (d. 865), Tang Dynasty Empress Dowager

=== Arts, entertainment & media ===
- Wah Chang, 鄭華明 (1917–2003), Honolulu-born designer for theatre and science fiction
- Adam Cheng (b. 1947), Hong Kong singer and actor
- Ekin Cheng (b. 1967), Hong Kong singer and actor
- Joe Cheng (b. 1982), Taiwanese actor and model
- Kevin Cheng (b. 1969), Hong Kong actor
- Sammi Cheng (b. 1972), Hong Kong singer and actress
- Zoe Tay (b. 1968), Singaporean actress
- Tay Ping Hui (b.1970), Singaporean actor
- Sharon Tay (b. 1966), Singaporean American journalist and television host
- The Teng Chun (1902–1977), Indonesian film producer
- Zheng Banqiao (1693–1765), artist and poet, Qing dynasty
- Zheng Guogu (born 1970), artist
- Zheng Shuang (actress, born 1991) (born 1991), Chinese Actress
- Zheng Zhenduo (1898–1958), journalist, modern writer, archeologist and literature scholar
- Zheng Geping (b. 1964), Singaporean actor
- Victor Zheng (b. 1992), Thai actor
- Zheng Naixin (b. 1997), Thai singer and actress
- Tay Ying (b. 1996), Singaporean actress

=== Politics ===
- Carrie Lam née Cheng Yuet-ngor, Hong Kong politician
- Cheng Wen-tsan (b. 1967), Mayor of Taoyuan City
- Chung Kok Ming, former Malaysian director and politician
- Chung Thye Phin (1879-1935), Malaysian businessman and politician
- Tay Eng Soon (1940-1993), Singaporean politician
- Patrick Tay (b. 1971), Singaporean trade unionist and politician
- Teh Cheang Wan (1928–1986), Singaporean architect and politician

=== Sports, fitness ===
- Zheng Ao (b. 2007), Chinese artistic gymnast
- Zheng Haohao (b. 2012), Chinese skateboarder
- Zheng Jie (b. 1983), Chinese tennis player
- Zheng Jiuyuan (b. 2004), Chinese diver
- Teh Kew San (1935–2026), Malaysian badminton player
- Cheng Man-ch'ing (1902–1975), martial artist, doctor, calligrapher, painter, poet
- Zheng Qinwen (b. 2002), Chinese tennis player
- Zheng Saisai (b. 1994), Chinese tennis player
- Zheng Siwei (b. 1997), Chinese badminton player
- Zheng Yumin (b. 1967), Chinese badminton player
- Zheng Zhi (b. 1980), Chinese footballer

=== Other ===
- Zheng Chenggong (1624–62), Ming dynasty military leader who founded the rebellious Kingdom of Tungning (1661–1683) in Taiwan during the Qing dynasty, the reason that the flag of Tungning featured the character 鄭 (Zheng) in its flag; better known in the West as Koxinga
- Zheng He (1371–1435), Chinese mariner and explorer who was famous for his vast treasure fleet and for reaching East Africa, South Asia, and South East Asia
- Zheng Yi (pirate) (1765–1807), a powerful Chinese pirate operating from Guangdong and throughout the South China Sea in the late 1700s
- Ching Shih (1775–1844), a female Chinese pirate and the widow of Zheng Yi, known for fighting the Qing, British, and Portuguese navies with 300+ junks and 20,000 - 40,000 Chinese pirates
- Zheng Yifeng (b. 1851), businessman and philanthropist based in Bangkok, known as Yi Kor Hong or Er Ger Feng.
- Cheng Hsiao-yu (1911–1942), fighter pilot and commander of the Chinese Air Force 4th Pursuit Group during the War of Resistance-World War II
- Zheng Shaoxiong (1997–2021), Chinese student who was murdered in the U.S.
- Cheng Yu-tung (1925–2016), Hong Kong billionaire
- Chung Keng Quee (1827-1901), Malaysian philanthropist
- Chung On Siew (1851-1907), Chinese philanthropist
- Chung Thye Yong, Malaysian philanthropist
- Nien Cheng (1915–2009), author and survivor of seven years of solitary confinement at the hands of the Communist party
- Tcheng Yu-hsiu (1891–1959), the first female lawyer and judge in Chinese history
- Teh Hong Piow (1930–2022), chairman of Public Bank Berhad in Malaysia
- Zheng Tianshou a pirate who pillaged during the Northern Song dynasty
- Alvin Cheng Kam-moon, a Hong Kong student activist
- Claudio Teehankee (1918–1989), Chinese-Filipino judge, later ambassador. He is included here under Cheng, Zheng because in Hokkien, his surname is Tee; similar to Malaysian or Singapore surnames Teh or Tay.
- Tay Yong Kwang (b. 1956), Singaporean judge

== See also ==
- Zheng clan of Xingyang, a prominent clan between the Han and Tang dynasties
- Zheng dynasty, Koxinga's family, which ruled Taiwan during the early Qing dynasty
- Jeong (surname), Zheng in Korean. Alternatively spelled Chung, Jung, or Jong.
- Chinese name
- Chinese surname
- List of common Chinese surnames
