= International Book Fair of Radical Black and Third World Books =

Showcase for Black and African diasporan literature (1982–1995)

- Genre: Literature
- Location: England
- Years active: 1982–1995
- Founded: 1982; 44 years ago
- Founders: Bogle-L'Ouverture Publications, New Beacon Books, Race Today Publications

The International Book Fair of Radical Black and Third World Books, often referred to as The Black Book Fair, was inaugurated in London, England, in April 1982 and continued until 1995, bringing together a number of Black publishers, intellectuals and educationalists. A notable showcase for diasporan African literature, it was held on 12 occasions: annually from 1982 to 1991, and then biennially, in 1993 and 1995. The first three Book Fairs took place in different areas of London — Islington, Lambeth and Acton — representing the respective bases of the three founding organisers: New Beacon Books, Race Today Publications and Bogle-L'Ouverture Publications.

Additionally, from 1985, there were associated book fairs held elsewhere in the UK, in Manchester (1985–91, 1995) and Bradford (1985–93), Leeds (1993, 1995), and in 1993 and 1995 in Glasgow, Scotland. In 1987 and 1988, a sister event — the Caribbean Peoples International Bookfair and Bookfair Festival — took place in Trinidad, organised by the Oilfields Workers' Trade Union there.

The ethos of the Book Fair was "to mark the new and expanding phase in the growth of radical ideas and concepts, and their expression in literature, politics, music, art and social life."

== History ==
The idea for an annual book fair was mooted in discussions after an event at the Commonwealth Institute in 1979 to celebrate the 10th anniversary of the founding by Jessica Huntley and Eric Huntley of Bogle-L'Ouverture Publications; described as a "cultural extravaganza", it featured a variety of performers, poets, drummers, dancers and musicians, including Misty in Roots, Keith Waithe, Cecil Rajendra, Linton Kwesi Johnson and others. Its success demonstrated "the potential for an event on this scale taking place in different parts of London and the UK on a regular basis", and the suggestion of an annual book fair was later developed and eventually implemented.

The International Book Fair of Radical Black and Third World Books was established by Bogle-L'Ouverture Publications, New Beacon Books and the Race Today collective in 1982, with the vision of being a "meeting of the continents for writers, publishers, distributors, booksellers, artists, musicians, film makers, and the people who inspire and consume their creative productions". The joint directors were John La Rose and Jessica Huntley until 1984, after which La Rose continued as sole director.

A call to the book fair, sent out in autumn 1981 by directors Jessica Huntley and John La Rose, stated: "The aim of the Book Fair is to mark the new phase in the growth of radical ideas and concepts and their expression in literature, politics, music, art and social life."

The first Book Fair was opened at Islington Town Hall on Thursday, 1 April 1982, by C. L. R. James (1982), and subsequent years saw other literary figures make the opening address, including Edward Kamau Brathwaite (1984), Wole Soyinka (1985), Ngũgĩ wa Thiong'o (1987), Abdul Alkalimat (1988), Farrukh Dhondy (1989), Jayne Cortez (1990), John La Rose (1991), Margaret Busby (1993), and Pearl Connor (1995).

The book fair itself took place on a Thursday, Friday and Saturday, with cultural and political forums and other events in the preceding days of the week, and a closing concert on the following Sunday. The first Book Fair week in 1982 was attended by some 6,000 people, and included on 30 March 1982 an "Evening of International Poetry" with performances (recorded for a subsequent album) by poets including John Agard, James Berry, Valerie Bloom, Edward Kamau Brathwaite, Accabre Huntley, Mahmood Jamal, Linton Kwesi Johnson, Christopher Laird, E. A. Markham, Jack Mapanje, Odia Ofeimun, Oku Onuora, Okot p'Bitek, Cecil Rajendra, Pedro Perez Sarduy and Mikey Smith.

Topics covered in the book fair forums included a discussion in 1982, with Jessica Huntley as presenter, on "Racist and fascist attacks on Black, left-wing and community booksellers and other institutions in Britain", or, in 1984, a forum entitled "Migrant Struggles in Britain and Europe", chaired by Darcus Howe. As noted by African-American feminist scholar Barbara Smith, the second book fair attracted some 150 publishers, from Africa, the Caribbean, North and Central America, Asia and Europe, including the UK.

Those who attended the Book Fair came not only to exhibit, order and distribute books, but also to take part in the accompanying programme of events that, alongside political discussion, showcased different cultural presentations, such as poetry and prose readings, drama, music and film shows.

The many notable participants over the years included John Agard, Ama Ata Aidoo, Tariq Ali, May Ayim, Imruh Bakari, Biyi Bandele, Amiri Baraka, James Berry, Valerie Bloom, Jean Binta Breeze, Yvonne Brewster, Dennis Brutus, Robert Chrisman, Merle Collins, Carolyn Cooper, Fred D'Aguiar, Melvin Edwards, Nuruddin Farah, Edouard Glissant, Lorna Goodison, Roy A. K. Heath, Tim Hector, bell hooks, Gus John, Linton Kwesi Johnson, June Jordan, Jackie Kay, Shake Keane, James Kelman, Talib Kibwe, Errol Lloyd, Earl Lovelace, Jack Mapanje, E. A. Markham, Paule Marshall, Pauline Melville, Louise Meriwether, Adrian Mitchell, Nancy Morejon, Lionel Ngakane, Pitika Ntuli, Odia Ofeimun, Olu Oguibe, Ben Okri, Kole Omotoso, Oku Onuora, Horace Ové, Alex Pascall, Okot p'Bitek, Caryl Phillips, John Pilger, Cecil Rajendra, Sonia Sanchez, Lawrence Scott, Mongane Wally Serote, Janice Shinebourne, Lemn Sissay, Mikey Smith, Pearl Springer, Wangui wa Goro, and Randy Weston.

In February 1997, a decision was taken by the Director and the Organising Committee of the Book Fair not to continue with it in its then form, proposing instead other future events in the Book Fair tradition, including the development of the George Padmore Institute.

== See also ==
- Black British Book Festival (founded 2021)
