= Eric L. Huntley =

Guyanese-born activist and educator (1929–2026)

- Born: Eric Lindbergh Huntley; 25 September 1929; Kitty, Georgetown, British Guiana (now Guyana)
- Died: 21 January 2026 (aged 96); London, England
- Occupations: Community rights activist and publisher
- Known for: Co-founder of Bogle-L'Ouverture Publications (1969)
- Spouse: Jessica Carroll (m. 1950; died 2013)
- Children: 4, including Accabre

Eric Lindbergh Huntley (25 September 1929 – 21 January 2026) was a Guyanese-born British activist, publisher and educator whose work promoted Black literature and social justice in the United Kingdom. Alongside his wife, Jessica Huntley, he co-founded Bogle-L'Ouverture Publications, a pioneering independent publishing house that provided a platform for radical Black voices and literature in Britain.

== Early life and political activism ==
Huntley was born on 25 September 1929 in Georgetown, British Guiana (now Guyana), one of his parents' 12 children; his father Frank, was a prison warder, and his mother Selina was a housewife. Huntley attended primary school in Georgetown but family hardship meant that he could not continue to high school, and he found work with the local post office. He met Jessica Carroll, a trainee typist, in 1948 and they married two years later, moving to the nearby village of Buxton.

Huntley became politically active from a young age, and was involved in the 1950 founding of the People's Progressive Party (PPP), an anti-colonial movement advocating for Guyana's independence from British rule. Working as a postman in Buxton, he managed to save enough money to buy a duplicating machine, on which he produced an unofficial journal for the Post Office Workers' Trade Union. His activism led to a year of incarceration, when the British government suspended the country's constitution in 1953 and in 1954 Huntley was arrested for breaking a curfew.

In 1957, facing political repression, he emigrated to London, with Jessica joining him a year later. Once in the UK, the Huntleys quickly became involved in the growing struggles for racial and social justice, particularly within the African-Caribbean community.

== Publishing and advocacy ==
In 1968, together with a group of associates, Huntley and his wife Jessica founded Bogle-L'Ouverture Publications (BLP), named after Caribbean freedom fighters Paul Bogle and Toussaint L’Ouverture. The immediate catalyst for this venture was the banning of the Guyanese historian Walter Rodney from returning to his teaching position in Jamaica due to his radical political views. In response, the Huntleys – with the encouragement of two existing Black publishers, John La Rose of New Beacon Books (founded in 1966) and Margaret Busby of Allison and Busby (founded in 1967) – published Rodney's The Groundings with My Brothers in 1969, marking the beginning of their efforts to amplify the voices of Black intellectuals, writers, and activists. The publishing house went on to produce works by notable figures such as Linton Kwesi Johnson, Valerie Bloom, Andrew Salkey and Lemn Sissay, contributing significantly to the dissemination of Black radical thought in Britain. Huntley was also an author himself, with his book Two Lives: Life and Times of Florence Nightingale and Mary Seacole being published by BLP in 1993.

=== The Walter Rodney Bookshop ===
In addition to their publishing work, the Huntleys opened a bookshop in West Ealing, London, in 1974, initially known as "The Bookshop" and later renamed the Walter Rodney Bookshop following Rodney's assassination in 1980. The shop became an important cultural and political hub, hosting readings, community meetings, and discussions on Black history and activism. Despite facing repeated racist attacks, the bookshop remained a central institution for Black British literature and activism until its closure in 1989 due to rising rents.

=== Community organizing and activism ===
Huntley and his wife were also deeply involved in grassroots activism beyond their publishing and bookselling efforts. They were key figures in the Caribbean Education and Community Workers Association (CECWA), an organization dedicated to improving educational opportunities for Black children. In 1975, they helped establish the Black Parents Movement (BPM) in response to the wrongful arrest of a Black schoolboy, highlighting the systemic racial discrimination within the British education system. In 1981, the Huntleys played a significant role in organising the Black People's Day of Action, a landmark protest that brought 20,000 demonstrators to the streets in response to racial injustice and police brutality following the New Cross house fire that claimed the lives of 13 black youngsters attending a birthday party.

== Legacy and recognition ==
The legacy of Eric and Jessica Huntley has been widely recognized. In 2005, they deposited their extensive archives at the London Metropolitan Archives, preserving decades of materials related to Black British activism and literature. Since 2006, an annual lecture series has been held in their honour, focusing on themes of racial equality and social justice. Their contributions were further commemorated in 2023 with the establishment of the Jessica Huntley Community Garden in Ealing, a space dedicated to fostering community engagement and education.

A Nubian Jak Community Trust blue plaque was unveiled in October 2018 outside the Huntleys' West Ealing home, commemorating their contributions to Black literary culture and activism.

== Death ==
Huntley died following a stroke in London, on 21 January 2026, at the age of 96. Among many tributes, one in Black History Month magazine observed that he "was widely respected for his humility, calm authority and quiet determination. He never sought recognition, and consistently directed praise away from himself, insisting that Jessica deserved the credit. Those who met him remember a man who spoke thoughtfully, listened carefully, and remained guided by principle throughout his life. He carried himself with the quiet confidence of someone who understood that real work is not always visible, but it is always felt."
