= Jessica Huntley =

Publisher and community rights activist (1927–2013)

- Born: Jessica Elleisse Carroll; 23 February 1927; Bagotstown, British Guiana (now Guyana)
- Died: 13 October 2013 (aged 86); Ealing Hospital, London, United Kingdom
- Occupations: Publisher and community rights activist
- Known for: Founder of Bogle-L'Ouverture Publications (1969)
- Spouse: Eric Huntley (m. 1950)
- Children: 3, including Accabre

Jessica Elleisse Huntley (née Carroll; 23 February 1927 – 13 October 2013) was a Guyanese-British political reformer and prominent race equality campaigner. She was a publisher of black and Asian literature, and a women's and community rights activist. She is notable as the founder in 1969 of Bogle-L'Ouverture Publications in London.

== Early life ==
She was born in Bagotstown, British Guiana (now Guyana) on 23 February (the date on which day the 18th-century Berbice slave uprising is commemorated) 1927, the only daughter and the youngest of four children of James Carroll and his wife, Hectorine (née Esbrand) Carroll.

Jessica was three years old when her father died, and her mother struggled financially to raise her children, nevertheless instilling the values of independence, discipline, justice and loyalty that informed Jessica's life. Unable to finish high school on the family's meagre finances, Jessica attended evening classes in shorthand and typing. With the hope of a clerical position becoming available, she worked in a garment factory, where she took up the cause of exploited female workers.

In 1950, she married Eric Huntley, and in the following two years gave birth to their first two children.

== Career ==
In January 1950, Jessica Huntley co-founded the first national government of British Guiana, elected through mass suffrage, alongside Leaders Cheddi Jagan, Janet Jagan, Eric Huntley, Eusi Kwayana and other members of the People's Progressive Party (PPP). In May 1953, Jessica Huntley co-founded in then British Guiana the Women's Progressive Organization to focus on women's rights as part of the PPP's independence struggle.

She was appointed the organizing secretary of the PPP, and stood as a candidate in the general election, but was not elected. She moved to the UK in April 1958, following her husband, who had moved there in 1957 to look for work.

== Bogle-L'Ouverture Publications ==
In 1969, Huntley co-founded, with her husband Eric Huntley, the London-based publishing company Bogle-L'Ouverture Publications (BLP), which was named in honour of two heroes of the Caribbean resistance, Toussaint L'Ouverture and Paul Bogle. Beginning with The Groundings With My Brothers, by Guyanese historian and scholar Walter Rodney, BLP went on to publish books by an expanding range of authors, including Andrew Salkey, Linton Kwesi Johnson, Lemn Sissay and Valerie Bloom.

A Nubian Jak Community Trust blue plaque unveiled in October 2018 outside the Huntleys' West Ealing home commemorates their work in the founding of Bogle-L'Ouverture.

== Other activity ==
The Bogle-L'Ouverture bookshop, opened by the Huntleys in Ealing in 1975, was one of the first Black bookshops in the UK, renamed as the Walter Rodney Bookshop following Rodney's assassination in 1980, and was a central hub for community action and creativity.

Huntley was instrumental in the establishment of the International Book Fair of Radical Black and Third World Books, held between 1982 and 1995, of which she was joint director with John La Rose until 1984.

Among other activism, in the 1980s Huntley was a co-founder with Margaret Busby and others of Greater Access to Publishing (GAP), a voluntary group campaigning for greater diversity within the mainstream publishing industry.

== Personal life ==
In 1948, she first met Eric Huntley (1929–2026), who was at the time a postal worker and trade union activist. They married on 9 December 1950 and lived for a period in the village of Buxton. They co-founded a political study group that met in their rented house. They had two sons there: Karl (who was named after Karl Marx) in 1951, and Chauncey in 1952.

Jessica Huntley died on 13 October 2013 at Ealing Hospital, survived by her husband Eric, their son Chauncey and daughter Accabre (named after one of the rebels in the Berbice slave uprising). Their son Karl died two years earlier, also on 13 October. Hundreds of people attended her funeral on 31 October at Southall's Christ the Redeemer Church, following which she was buried in Greenford Park Cemetery.

== Archives and legacy ==
In 2005, papers relating to the business of Bogle-L'Ouverture, together with documents concerning the personal, campaigning and educational initiatives of Jessica and Eric Huntley from 1952 to 2011, were deposited at London Metropolitan Archives (LMA).

Since 2006, the Huntley Archives at LMA have inspired an annual conference on themes reflecting different elements of the content of the collection.

A blue plaque, organized by the Nubian Jak Community Trust and others, was unveiled in October 2018 outside the Ealing home of Jessica Huntley and Eric Huntley to commemorate their work in founding Bogle-L'Ouverture.

In October 2024, a biography titled Jessica Huntley's Pan-African Life: The Decolonizing Work of a Radical Black Activist, written by Claudia Tomlinson, was published by Bloomsbury Academic.

== See also ==
- John La Rose
- Margaret Busby
