= Accabre Huntley =

British poet of Guyanese parentage (born 1967)

- Born: 1967 (age 58–59); London, England
- Occupation: Poet
- Notable work: At School Today (1977)
- Parent(s): Jessica and Eric L. Huntley

Accabre Huntley (born 1967) is a British poet of Guyanese parentage. She became a published poet as a child, and has performed nationally and internationally on radio and television.

== Life ==
Accabre Huntley – named after one of the insurgents in the 18th-century Berbice Rebellion – was born in London, England, in 1967, the daughter of activists and publishers Jessica and Eric Huntley, who founded Bogle-L'Ouverture Publications in 1969. At the age of seven, she wrote a poem about suffering racist abuse that was published by Valerie Sinason, who was then doing therapeutic work with children in East London. At the age of nine or ten, she published a book of poems, At School Today, with Bogle -L'Ouverture. While studying at Reynolds High School in Acton, London, she published her second poetry collection, Easter Monday Blues.

Huntley's work has been anthologised in collections including James Berry's News from Babylon (1984) and children's anthologies like Grace Nichols' Black Poetry (1988).

She leads poetry workshops in schools.

== Works ==
- At School Today. Ealing: Bogle-L'Ouverture, 1977.
- Easter Monday Blues. Ealing: Bogle-L'Ouverture, 1983.
