= List of honorary fellows of Pembroke College, Cambridge =

This is a list of Honorary Fellows of Pembroke College, Cambridge.

- Charles Freer Andrews
- Sir Michael Atiyah
- Sir Michael Bett
- Paul Bew, Baron Bew
- Martin Biddle
- Cath Bishop
- Jeremy Bloxham
- Vicky Bowman
- David Brading
- Kamau Brathwaite
- Sir Patrick Browne
- A. David Buckingham
- Sir John Chilcot
- James Crowden
- Gail Davey
- Ray Dolby
- Sir Simon Donaldson
- Sir Patrick Elias
- Roger W. Ferguson Jr.
- Stephen Greenblatt
- Sir Charles Haddon-Cave
- Christopher Hogwood
- Sir Christopher Hum
- Eric Idle
- Greg Jackson
- Clive James
- William H. Janeway
- Emma Johnson
- Sir John Kingman
- Richard Ned Lebow
- Robert Macfarlane
- Simon McDonald, Baron McDonald of Salford
- Dame Henrietta Moore
- Sir Stephen Nickell
- Gerald O'Collins
- Jim Prior, Baron Prior
- Joanna Prior
- George Maxwell Richards
- Sir Mark Richmond
- Peter Ringrose
- Sir Konrad Schiemann
- Chris Smith, Baron Smith of Finsbury
- Sir John Sulston
- Rajesh Thakker
- Karan Thapar
- Jack Thorne
- Joe Vinen
- Sir Alan Ward
