= St. Xavier's Institution =

- Sekolah Menengah Kebangsaan St. Xavier (Malay) 圣方济中学 (Simplified Chinese) சைன்ட் சவேரியார் உயர்நிலை பள்ளி (Tamil)

Location
- Farquhar Street, George Town, Penang, 10200; Malaysia; 5.420978°N 100.336884°E

Information
- Type: Co-educational secondary school
- Motto: Latin: Labor Omnia Vincit (Labour Conquers All)
- Religious affiliation: Christian
- Denomination: Roman Catholic
- Patron saint: St. Francis Xavier
- Established: 1852; 174 years ago
- Founder: De La Salle Brothers
- Principal: Janestanstein Stephen
- Brother Director: Br. Jason Blaikie, FSC
- Grades: Forms 1-Upper 6
- Gender: Co-educational
- Colours: Green and gold
- Feeder schools: St. Xavier's Branch Primary School, Pulau Tikus; St. Xavier's Primary School, Air Itam
- Affiliations: Lasallian educational institutions
- Abbreviation: SXI
- Website: www.sxi.edu.my

St. Xavier's Institution, at Farquhar Street in George Town, Penang, Malaysia, is the oldest Lasallian school in Southeast Asia and one of the Catholic Lasallian schools in Malaysia. While it has a history dating back to 1787, the present-day institution, named after St. Francis Xavier, was only established in 1852.

This secondary school has been an all-boys school since its establishment, although girls have been admitted in Form 6 since the 1950s (but as of 2022, it is now a co-educational secondary school ever since female students were admitted for the first time beginning in Form 1 of the batch born in 2009 for the 2022-2023 Malaysian school academic year). In addition, the school is renowned for producing several notable Malaysian and Singaporean personalities, including Wong Pow Nee, Karpal Singh, Cecil Rajendra and Hon Sui Sen. Students of the school are colloquially known as Xaverians or Lasallians.

To this day, St. Xavier's Institution maintains its historical rivalry with Penang Free School, another premier school in George Town which holds the honour of being Malaysia's oldest school. The school has two suburban feeder primary schools at Pulau Tikus and Air Itam.

== History ==
The history of St. Xavier's Institution stretches all the way back to 1787, soon after the founding of George Town by Captain Francis Light. Light invited Bishop Arnaud-Antoine Garnault, a French Catholic priest, to George Town as Bishop Garnault and his Eurasian followers were fleeing political persecution in Siam. After arriving in George Town, Bishop Garnault who was proficient in Malay, set up a Malay school at Church Street.

The Malay school was subsequently relocated into a brick house built by Jean-Baptiste Boucho of the Paris Foreign Missions in 1825 and converted into an English school. It was called the Catholic Free School, in opposition to Penang Free School which had been established by Protestants in 1816.

In 1852, three members of the De La Salle Brothers took over the administration of Catholic Free School upon invitation by Jean-Baptiste Boucho. The school was renamed as St. Francis Xavier's Free School after St. Francis Xavier, a Spanish Catholic missionary who is revered to this day for his extensive missions in Asia during the 16th century.

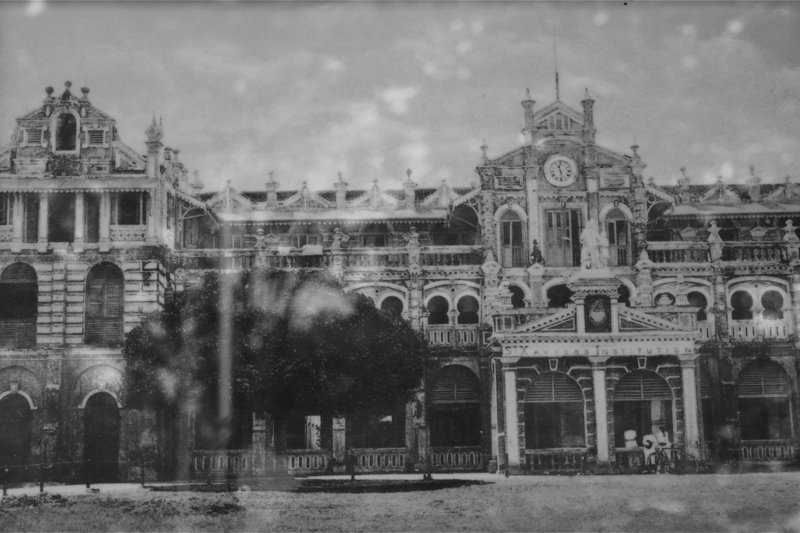
St Xavier's Institution in 1857

St. Francis Xavier's Free School was moved to its present grounds at Farquhar Street with the completion of a new school building in 1858. With this relocation, the school was finally renamed as St. Xavier's Institution. This building was expanded several times over the years, before it was replaced by a grander Baroque-style double-storey building in 1895. A third storey was added in 1901 and a wing was constructed in 1908.

During the Japanese occupation in World War II, the Imperial Japanese Navy used the school building as a Marine barracks. As a result, the school building was completely destroyed by American bombers in the later years of the war.

With the main building wiped out, school sessions resumed after the war at the adjacent school field, with temporary attap sheds serving as classrooms. In 1954, the current school building was completed at a cost of about $2 million (Malaya and British Borneo dollar).

Brother Paul Ho was the last La Salle Brother in SXI to serve as a school principal. His retirement in 2009 marked the end of a long-standing era of La Sallian brother principals in Malaysia.

In 2022, the school transformed into fully co-educational, where it previously only enrolled boys from Forms 1 up to 5.

== Feeder schools ==
St Xavier's Institution currently operates two feeder primary schools in the suburbs of George Town.

St. Xavier's Primary School (SRK St. Xavier) was originally sharing the same premise with the secondary school at Farquhar Street. It relocated in 1990 to the former site of La Salle School at Jalan Sekolah La Salle in Air Itam. La Salle School was established in 1962 but phased out in 1981.

St. Xavier's Primary Branch School (SRK St. Xavier Cawangan) located at Jalan Brother James, Pulau Tikus was opened on 10 March 1962.

While the schools are not closely associated with each other, most pupils go on to continue their secondary studies in St. Xavier's Institution. Regular annual tours are also organised by the schools which usually bring the students of the two primary schools on a "day tour" in St. Xavier's Institution (whilst its female students would come from several suburban schools since it has no single-sex all-female feeder schools affiliated with this school).

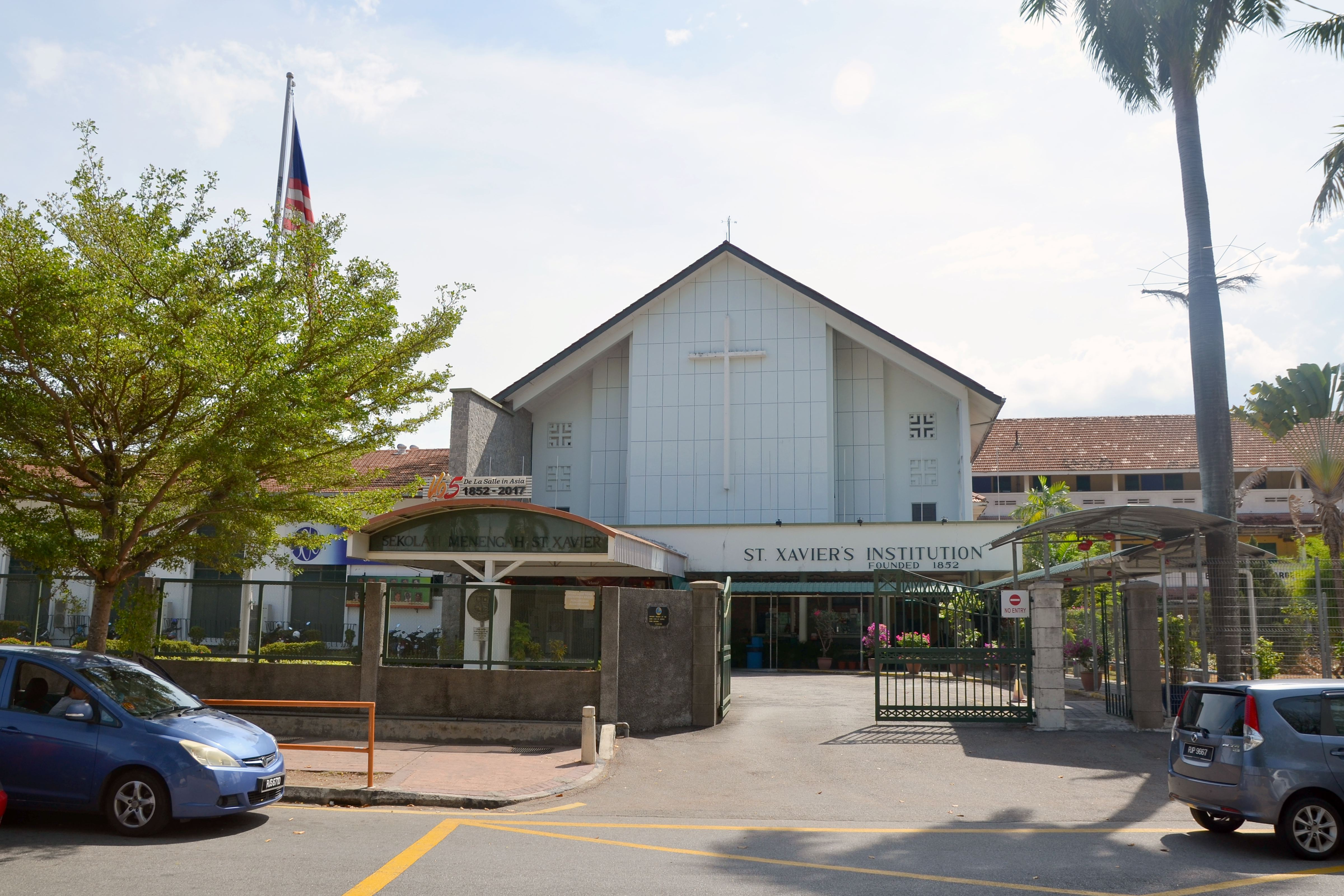
St Xavier's Institution viewed from Farquhar Street in January 2020

== Notable alumni ==
- Cecil Rajendra - Malaysian lawyer, world-renowned poet and nominee for the Nobel Prize in Literature 2005
- Chung Thye Phin - tin and rubber tycoon, and one of the wealthiest men in Penang in the late 19th century
- Daim Zainuddin - former Minister of Finance from 1984 to 1991 and again from 1999 to 2001
- Heah Joo Seang - Malayan rubber tycoon and politician
- Hon Sui Sen - Singapore's Minister for Finance (1970-1983)
- James W. Boyle - musician
- K. Gurunathan - mayor of Kāpiti Coast District in New Zealand (2016-)
- Karpal Singh - Malaysian lawyer, top opposition politician and former Member of Parliament for Jelutong (1978-1999)
- Shukor Salleh - former Malaysia national team footballer
- Leong Yew Koh - first Yang di-Pertua Negeri of Malacca from 1957 to 1959, Secretary-General of the Malaysian Chinese Association from 1952 to 1957
- Lawrence Loh - architect and co-owner of the famous Cheong Fatt Tze Mansion
- Leslie C. Hoffman - first Asian editor-in-chief of The Straits Times, a Singaporean daily
- Lim Eu Toh - Penang-based businessman
- Ooi Kee Beng - deputy director of Singapore's ISEAS-Yusof Ishak Institute
- Nor Mohamed Yakcop - former Malaysian minister in the Prime Minister's Department (2009-2013)
- Ramkarpal Singh - Malaysian politician and Member of Parliament for Bukit Gelugor (2014-)
- Saw Teong Hin - Malaysian film director
- Sonni Pillai - former city secretary of the George Town City Council (1956-1970)
- Sydney Quays - Malaysian businessman, Group CEO of Berjaya Food Berhad and managing director of Starbucks Malaysia.
- Tan June Khim - Australian Cyber Security Specialist. Sydney, Australia.
- Wong Chun Wai - deputy group chief editor of The Star, a Malaysian English-language daily
- Wong Pow Nee - first Chief Minister of Penang
