= Toh Allang Chinese Tin Ltd. =

Toh Allang Chinese Tin Ltd., also known as Tanjong Toh Alang Tin Mines Ltd., was registered in the Federated Malay States in 1925, and was the first all-Chinese limited liability company formed in Perak (Malaysia). It took over the mining leases owned by towkays Ho Man, Foo Choong Nyit and Chung Thye Phin, who had been working by lampanning and shafting in the area since about 1917.
