= School of Industrial Technology, Universiti Sains Malaysia =

The School of Industrial Technology (Malay: Pusat Pengajian Teknologi Industri, PPTI) is one of nineteen schools in USM, Malaysia. It has emerged from the School of Applied Sciences which was established during the inception of the university. The name of the school was changed to the School of Engineering Sciences and Industrial Technology in 1984. However, in 1986, the engineering programme was shifted to a new campus at Tronoh (and later moved to the present Engineering Campus at Seberang Prai Selatan, Penang). Since then, the School of Industrial Technology has undergone rapid development to achieve its present position among academic institutions in the country. The last two decades have witnessed various advances, developments and achievements of the School pertaining to academic programmes, research and development, consultancy, community services and many others.

== Programmes offered ==
The School offers four programmes at undergraduate level leading to the Bachelor of Technology, viz.

- Bioresource Technology (previously named as Bioresource, Paper and Coatings Technology)
- Food Technology
- Environmental Technology.
- Bioprocess Technology

Each of the four programmes has its own distinct curriculum spread over three to four years (6-8 semesters) (Four years for Food Technology and Bioprocess). The main objective of the undergraduate programme is to train and produce technologists in their respective specialisation to serve the industry and public sector in the country. The comprehensive three-year programme is designed to cover the fundamental science courses as well as engineering and technological aspects of processing/production, preservation, analysis, quality control, maintenance, etc. The technological component is progressively increased as the student move into higher level of study. Every student is also required to undergo a minimum of eight weeks industrial training at the end of the second year.

== Enrolment Statistics ==
On average, the total number of undergraduate students for each academic session is around 600 to 700.
