= Joanna Prior =

British publishing executive (born 1966)

Joanna Melancy Lyndon Prior (born February 1966) is a senior British publishing executive who has served as the Chief Executive Officer (CEO) of Pan Macmillan since April 2022.

== Early life and education ==
Joanna Melancy Lyndon Prior was born in February 1966. She grew up in London where she attended James Allen's Girls' School before joining the first female undergraduate intake at Pembroke College, Cambridge, in 1984 where she read English.

== Career ==
=== Early career ===
Prior found her way into publishing by chance, after covering a friend's job for a fortnight when she was on holiday. She held her first permanent role at Pan MacMillan. She later worked at 4th Estate, a small independent publisher, and had a brief and unsuccessful stint as a journalist as editor of The Sunday Telegraph Magazine.

=== Penguin Random House UK ===
Prior joined Penguin in 1998 as Publicity Director and Corporate Communications Director, later expanding her responsibilities to include marketing. From 2009 to 2022, she served as Managing Director of Penguin General Books, one of eight publishing houses under Penguin Random House UK. During her 12-year tenure, Penguin General doubled in size, added new imprints, and achieved significant accolades, including Publisher of the Year in 2019, two Women’s Prize for Fiction awards, and the Booker Prize for Bernardine Evaristo's Girl, Woman, Other. The imprint also published bestsellers such as Michelle Obama's Becoming, Barack Obama's A Promised Land, and Richard Osman's The Thursday Murder Club.

=== Pan Macmillan ===
In April 2022, Prior succeeded Anthony Forbes Watson as CEO of Pan Macmillan, a top-five UK publisher founded in 1843, with offices in London, Australia, India, and South Africa, and was at the time the only woman in the top five. Her leadership has driven record-breaking commercial success, with Pan Macmillan achieving an 8% growth in the UK and 12% globally in 2023, alongside a 5.3% increase in UK sales value, outperforming the market. Fiction sales grew by 13.1%, tripling the market rate.

Prior has introduced initiatives such as the "Making a Difference" programme, which included partnerships such as the Black British Book Festival, the Writers on the Rise mentoring scheme, and the Gift a Gruffalo campaign, donating books to disadvantaged children. Additionally, Prior implemented progressive policies, including enhanced family leave, a menopause policy, and professional coaching for employees returning from parental leave.

=== Industry leadership ===
Prior has held prominent roles in the publishing industry, including President of The Publishers Association (2015), Chair of the Consumer Publishing Council, and Chair of World Book Day (2012). She served on the board of the Women’s Prize for Fiction for ten years, chairing it for six until March 2022. She has been a Trustee of the National Literacy Trust since 2015, becoming Vice-Chair in 2019 and Chair in March 2022.

She was elected back onto the Council of The Publishers Association in May 2023.

=== Recognition ===
In 2024, Prior was named one of the most effective female executives in the UK by Management Today's Women in Leadership Power List.

She is an Honorary Fellow of Pembroke College, Cambridge, and has served on the Board of the College's "The Time and the Place" fundraising campaign.

She was appointed Officer of the Order of the British Empire (OBE) for Services to Publishing and Literacy in the 2025 New Year Honours List.

=== Personal life ===
Prior has one daughter.
