= Selina Brown =

British author and founder of Black British Book Festival

- Born: Birmingham, England
- Education: Goldsmiths, University of London (BA); University of East London (MSc)
- Occupations: Author and literary events producer
- Known for: Founder and CEO of the Black British Book Festival
- Website: selinabrown.com

Selina Brown is a British author and literary events producer of Jamaican heritage. She has written three children's picture books, two about a girl named Nena and a third titled My Rice is Best. She is the founder and CEO of the Black British Book Festival, started in 2021, which has become the largest Black literature festival in Europe.

== Early life and education ==
Born in Birmingham, Selina Brown was raised by her British mother and Jamaican grandmother. Brown attended Cumberland Community School in Plaistow and completed her A-Levels at Newham Sixth Form College in 2008. Brown graduated with a Bachelor of Arts (BA) degree in Sociology from Goldsmiths, University of London, and then a Master of Science (MSc) from the University of East London. As a teenager, she became active in public service: at the age of 16, she was elected Youth Mayor (Youth MP) of Nottingham.

== Career ==
Brown's early career included marketing and communications roles at media organisations.

As an author, she self-published two children's picture books during the COVID-19 pandemic. These feature a young girl named Nena who learns to enjoy fruits and vegetables. In 2024, she secured a two-book publishing deal with Penguin Random House Children's UK. Her debut picture book for this contract My Rice is Best explores cultural pride and friendship through the humorous rivalry between two children over their favorite rice dishes.

In 2021, Brown launched the Black British Book Festival (BBBF), which was first held in Birmingham. The festival was conceived to celebrate emerging Black British authors and to address the lack of representation in the literary industry. The festival grew rapidly; by 2023, it partnered with London's Southbank Centre and drew thousands of attendees, and media have described it as the largest Black literature festival in Europe. She was recognized for this work as Leader of the Year at The Bookseller FutureBook Awards in 2024 and the London Book Fair Trailblazer Award in 2025. The BBBF was held at the Barbican Centre in 2025.

Brown also hosts a weekly podcast for writers. "Write and Win Podcast with Selina Brown".

In October 2025, following a decline in the publication of Black literature in the UK since 2022, Brown announced a new publishing collaboration with Pan Macmillan, focusing on writers who have not been traditionally published.

== Publications ==
- Nena: The Green Juice (self-published 2020)
- Nena: Granny’s Magic Fruit Salad (self-published 2020)
- "Never Make Peace with Mediocrity", in Encounters with James Baldwin: Celebrating 100 years (Supernova Books, 2024)
- My Rice is Best (Penguin Random House Children's UK, 2025)
