= James W. Boyle =

Malaysian musician (1922–1971)

Jimmy Boyle
- Born: James W. Boyle; 26 July 1922; Kelawei Road, George Town, Penang, Straits Settlements, British Empire
- Died: 8 May 1971 (aged 48); Georgetown, Penang, Malaysia
- Citizenship: Malaysian
- Occupations: Composer, jazz musician
- Children: Pamela Anne Miller (Boyle) and James P. S. Boyle

James W. Boyle (26 July 1922 – 8 May 1971), better known as Jimmy Boyle, was a Malaysian musician of Eurasian extraction.

== Biography ==
James W. Boyle was born on 26 July 1922 at Kelawei Road, George Town, Penang (in what was then the Straits Settlements), to Jeanne Moissinac and John Walter Patrick Boyle, ethnic Eurasian Bumiputera parents of mixed French (maternal) and Irish (paternal) descent. He attended St. Xavier's Institution, and continued his education at Raffles College, Singapore. In 1946, he was hired by St. Xavier's to teach.

Boyle became a composer for the Classical Saxophone Quartet of the Northwest University Brass Ensemble. His work has received praise from the likes of Charles Lloyd (jazz musician) and Jack Teagarden, and has been played on the BBC and Voice of America.

Boyle composed the first Malaysian Jamboree song, Kemegahan Negaraku (My Country's Majesty), which was chosen to be played at midnight in conjunction with the birth of Malaysia on 16 September 1963.

On 8 May 1971, Boyle died of an intracerebral haemorrhage.
