= How Europe Underdeveloped Africa =

1972 book by Walter Rodney

- Author: Walter Rodney
- Language: English
- Genre: Essay
- Publisher: Bogle-L'Ouverture Publications
- Publication date: 1972
- Publication place: United Kingdom
- Media type: Print (hardcover, paperback); e-book
- Pages: 312
- ISBN: 0-9501546-4-4

How Europe Underdeveloped Africa is a 1972 book written by Walter Rodney that describes how Africa was deliberately exploited and underdeveloped by European colonial regimes. One of his main arguments throughout the book is that Africa developed Europe at the same rate that Europe underdeveloped Africa.

Rodney argues that a combination of power politics and economic exploitation of Africa by Europeans led to the poor state of African political and economic development evident in the late 20th century. Though, he did not intend "to remove the ultimate responsibility for development from the shoulders of Africans... [He believes that] every African has a responsibility to understand the [capitalist] system and work for its overthrow."

This book, along with Frantz Fanon's The Wretched of the Earth, is a popular example of 20th century books concerning African development and post-colonial theory.

== Background ==
Rodney was a Marxist scholar and activist from Guyana, educated at the University of the West Indies and the School of Oriental and African Studies (SOAS), University of London. His work was grounded in both historical research and his political commitment to Pan-Africanism, Black liberation, and anti-imperialism. First published in London by Bogle-L'Ouverture Publications in 1972 (in partnership with Tanzanian Publishing House), the book shaped the study of Africa in many disciplines. Rodney wrote the text while lecturing in Tanzania at the University of Dar es Salaam, during the presidency of Julius Nyerere. Tanzanian scholar Karim F Hirji has described the work as, "no doubt the 20th century's most important and influential book on African history."

== Synopsis ==
Rodney says that to fully appreciate and understand the effect of European exploitation on Africa, four distinct issues need to be addressed: a reconstruction of pre-European Africa's developmental condition, that of pre-expansionist Europe, and their contributions to each other's present condition, developed or otherwise. After an introductory chapter in which he definitionally discusses development, underdevelopment, and associated terminologies in their historical and contemporary contexts, he devotes a chapter to each of these four issues. He concludes the book with a chapter critiquing arguments that promote the "supposed benefit of colonialism". In this chapter, he also explains the means through which colonialism is linked to Africa's present underdevelopment.

== Themes ==
=== Underdevelopment ===
Rodney defines underdevelopment not as the absence of development, but as the active process by which certain societies become impoverished through their interaction with others. He writes: "The question is not whether Africa is underdeveloped but who and what made Africa underdeveloped."

=== Colonial education ===
Rodney critiques colonial education as a tool for mental colonization, designed to create obedient clerks rather than empowered citizens or intellectuals.

=== Imperialism ===
The book situates African colonialism within a larger framework of imperialist expansion. Rodney emphasizes how capitalism in Europe required raw materials, cheap labor, and markets—all provided by Africa.

=== Self-reliance and revolution ===
Rodney concludes that African liberation depends on socialist development, popular mobilization, and Pan-African solidarity.

== Impact and reception ==
How Europe Underdeveloped Africa became a cornerstone text for postcolonial African studies, revolutionary movements, and anti-imperialist scholarship. It has been taught in universities across the Global South and remains central to debates on development, reparations, and global inequality.

The book has influenced generations of African and Caribbean intellectuals, including Ngũgĩ wa Thiong'o and Samir Amin. It remains widely cited in academic and activist circles.

While praised for its rigor and revolutionary spirit, the book has also been criticized by some Western scholars for its ideological stance and reliance on Marxist analysis. Nonetheless, its historical narrative and data have held up under decades of scrutiny.

Some historians have challenged some of Rodney statements like the claim that African slaves were traded with "rubbish" and criticized his portrayal of Africans as powerless or easily-duped victims of the whites.

== Editions ==
- (1972) London: Bogle-L'Ouverture Publications (ISBN 0-9501546-4-4)
- (1974) Washington, DC: Howard University Press (ISBN 0-88258-013-2)
- (1981) Howard University Press (ISBN 0-88258-096-5)
- (1982) Howard University Press (ISBN 0-88258-105-8)
- (2018) Verso Books (ISBN 978-1-78873-118-8)

== See also ==
- Open Veins of Latin America, a 1971 book analysing the impact that European settlement, imperialism, and slavery have had in Latin America
