= Chung Thye Yong =

Malaysian philanthropist, tin miner, rubber planter, rugby player and racehorse owner

- Traditional Chinese: 鄭大養
- Simplified Chinese: 郑大养
Transcriptions
Yue: Cantonese
- Jyutping: Zeng6 Daai6 Joeng5
Southern Min
- Hokkien POJ: Tēⁿ Tāi-ióng
- Tâi-lô: Tēnn Tāi-ióng

Chung Ah Yong
- Traditional Chinese: 鄭亞養
- Simplified Chinese: 郑亚养
Transcriptions
Yue: Cantonese
- Jyutping: Zeng6 Aa3 Joeng5
Southern Min
- Hokkien POJ: Tēⁿ A-ióng
- Tâi-lô: Tēnn A-ióng

Chung Thye Yong (simplified Chinese: 郑大养; traditional Chinese: 鄭大養; pinyin: Zhèng Dà Yǎng; Jyutping: Zeng6 Daai6 Joeng5; Pe̍h-ōe-jī: Tēⁿ Tāi-ióng; 1868 – 20 Oct 1915), also known as Chung Ah Yong (simplified Chinese: 郑亚养; traditional Chinese: 鄭亞養; Jyutping: Zeng6 Aa3 Joeng5; Pe̍h-ōe-jī: Tēⁿ A-ióng), was a Malaysian philanthropist, tin miner, rubber planter, rugby player and racehorse owner of the 19th century.

== Family and pedigree ==
Born in Penang, Chung Thye Yong was the adopted son of Chung Keng Quee and the eldest in the family.

He was the brother of Chung Thye Phin and Chung Thye Siong and the father of Chung Kok Ming.

== Education ==
He was educated at Doveton College in Calcutta, India.

== Career ==
He joined the Government civil service in Perak for a time right after school and then took over the management of his father's Taiping property and became owner of the Yong Phin Mine at Kota near Taiping after his father died in 1901.

His 3,000-acre (12 km^{2}) Hearwood Estate near Sungei Siput, managed by E. Hardouin and with W. D. Wyesuriya as under manager, employed a workforce of 200 Javanese and Tamil workers to cultivate among other crops, rubber, lemongrass and coconuts. The estate was rich with tin and mines there were worked by Chinese who paid taxes for that benefit. He floated his estate into a Limited Liability Company in Singapore in 1906.

== Sports ==
In his day he was described as one of the most enthusiastic sportsmen in the Federated States.

He was the first person of Chinese descent in the country to play rugby.

He was the first racehorse owner in Taiping, then the capital of Perak. His racing stables cost him over 12,000 Straits Dollars a year and he placed his prize-winning horses under the charge of a European trainer.

He was believed to have been the first person of Chinese ancestry in the country to play golf.

He was a generous benefactor to the people of Taiping and in 1909 arranged to have a tennis court attached to the Taiping Recreational Club which immediately became greatly in demand.

He (minus 100) was an avid billiard player and defeated Lauder Watson (minus 15) in the final of the Perak Club Billiard handicap in 1908.

== Social service ==
He was a member of the Taiping Sanitary Board and a Visiting Justice to the Federated Malay States.

== Societies ==
He was a member of the Royal Society of Arts, London.
