= Cecil Rajendra =

Malaysian poet and lawyer (born 1941)

- Born: 1941 (age 84–85); Penang, Malaysia
- Education: University of Singapore; Lincoln's Inn
- Occupations: Lawyer, poet

Cecil Rajendra (born 1941) is a Malaysian poet and lawyer. His poems have been published in more than 50 countries and translated into several languages.

== Early life and education ==
Born in Penang, Rajendra completed his education at St. Xavier's Institution (elementary), the University of Singapore (undergraduate), and Lincoln's Inn (legal, London).

== Career ==
Rajendra, nicknamed 'The Lawyer-Poet', writes controversial poems that address human rights and environmental problems. As an attorney, his work has focused on helping poorer people who are in need of legal aid. He is a co-founder of Penang Legal Aid Centre (PLAC).

Working with photographer Ismail Hasim, Rajendra explored the backstreets of the island of Penang before the pair compiled and published Scent of an Island, a collection of poetry and black-and-white photographs of Penang.

In 1993, he had his passport taken from him by the Malaysian government, to prevent him from traveling. A Malaysian High Commission spokesman stated, "Mr Rajendra's passport was retained for his anti-logging activities, which it was felt could damage the country's image overseas".

== Recognition ==
In 2005, Rajendra was awarded the first Malaysian Lifetime Humanitarian Award "in recognition of his pioneering legal aid work and exemplary poetry". Also in 2005, he was nominated for the Nobel Prize in Literature, which went to Harold Pinter.

== Published works ==
=== Poetry ===
- Embryo (Regency, 1965)
- Bones and Feathers (Heinemann, Writing in Asia Series, 1978, ISBN 978-0686603337)
- Refugees & Other Despairs (Choice Books, 1980)
- Hour of Assassins (1983; Bogle-L'Ouverture Press, 1993, ISBN 978-0904521290)
- Songs for the Unsung... Poems on Unpoetic Issues like War and Want, and Refugees (World Council of Churches, 1983, ISBN 978-2825407851)
- Child of the Sun (Bogle-L'Ouverture Publications, 1986; Bogle-L'Ouverture Press, 1993, ISBN 978-0904521382)
- Dove on Fire: Poems on Peace, Justice and Ecology (World Council of Churches, 1986, ISBN 978-2825408995)
- Lovers, Lunatics & Lallang (Bogle-L'Ouverture Publications, 1989, ISBN 978-0904521474)
- Broken Buds (Friends of Bogle [distributor], 1994, ISBN 978-8185569086)
- Personal & Profane
- Leave-taking

=== Books ===
- No Bed of Roses: The Rose Chan Story (Marshall Cavendish International Asia, 2013, ISBN 978-9814408202)
