= Black British Book Festival =

Book fair in the UK, founded 2021

Black British Book Festival BBBF
- Status: Active
- Genre: Literature
- Frequency: Annually, in October
- Location: England
- Inaugurated: 2021; 5 years ago
- Organizer: Selina Brown
- Website: blackbritishbookfestival.com

The Black British Book Festival (BBBF) was launched in 2021 with a mission "to create a space where Black British authors were celebrated, not sidelined". Held annually, the one-day BBBF has been described as Europe's largest Black literature event. The festival's founder is Selina Brown, a British author of Jamaican heritage. Since its launch the festival has reached more than 100,000 people and expanded into a national movement spanning London, Manchester and Birmingham.

== History ==
Founder and CEO Selina Brown was inspired to start the Black British Book Festival (BBBF) after she successfully self-published her first two books – Before Breath (2015) and Nena: The Green Juice (2020) – following disappointing experiences when she had tried to interest existing publishers. The BBBF was created to celebrate emerging Black British authors across all genres.

Prior to founding the festival, Brown had worked at the BBC, MTV and Freud Communications, with experience spanning New York, Kenya and Gambia. She became Youth MP for Nottingham at the age of 16 and obtained two degrees and a Master's by the age of 21.

First held in October 2021 in Birmingham, where Brown was born, the BBBF drew 800 attendees in its inaugural year, attracting twice that number in the next year. Notable speakers included David Olusoga, Lenny Henry, Jasmine Richards and T. L. Huchu, with headline sponsorship from Pan Macmillan, Penguin Random House and BookTrust.

In 2023, the BBBF moved to London for a two-day event at the Southbank Centre, opening with Leigh-Anne Pinnock launching her memoir Believe. Further speakers included Clive Myrie, Oti Mabuse, Fats Timbo, Gary Younge, Candice Braithwaite, Dawn Butler and Joseph Coelho. Headline sponsors that year included Pan Macmillan, Audible, Hachette, Simon & Schuster and Penguin. Brown also curated a Black literature event with the artist George the Poet at the Glastonbury Festival that year.

In 2024, the festival was held at the Barbican Centre, with speakers including Grammy Award-winning rapper Eve, who discussed her autobiography Who's That Girl?; Diane Abbott, the UK's first Black female Member of Parliament; presenter Charlene White; activists Mikaela Loach and Kwajo Tweneboa; and Paul Brunson. Also appearing was poet Caleb Femi.

In 2025, the festival returned to the Barbican Centre for its fifth edition on 19 October, now attracting more than 5,500 attendees annually. Headline speakers included Sir Lenny Henry and Marcus Ryder MBE in a conversation on reparations titled "The Big Payback"; June Sarpong OBE and Denise Lewis DBE in conversation on legacy and identity; Jordan Stephens on fame, fatherhood and mental health; American author and entrepreneur Tabitha Brown at her first UK appearance; and JB Gill of British band JLS. A new community-led publishing model was also announced between the festival and four-year-long sponsors Pan Macmillan, including the "Writers on the Rise" mentorship programme, which connects emerging writers with Pan Macmillan editors to provide one-to-one guidance and industry support.

In March 2026, founder Selina Brown was awarded the inaugural Queen's Reading Room Medal by Queen Camilla at a ceremony at Clarence House, becoming the first person to receive the honour and the first to be named the United Kingdom's National Reading Hero. The citation recognised her work in founding the Black British Book Festival and for bringing inclusive stories into primary schools in areas with low literacy rates. Brown also spoke at the London Book Fair in March 2026 on a panel addressing equity of expression and the representation of marginalised voices in publishing.

== Collaborations ==
In 2023, the BBBF toured the UK, with some 60 authors going to seven cities, including events held in unconventional community spaces such as chicken shops, hairdressers, sportswear shops and shopping centres, with the aim of reaching communities historically underserved by the publishing industry. The festival has also showcased the work of Black writers in partnership with major cultural and literary initiatives such as the Hay Festival, the Cheltenham Literature Festival and the Glastonbury Festival. The BBBF has organised "takeovers" of Manchester Central Library, with 3,000 attendees at the March 2025 event, featuring authors including Kehinde Andrews, Joseph Coelho, Kit de Waal, Jeffrey Boakye and DJ Paulette.

In 2023, the BBBF opened the Croydon Black Book Community Library, a dedicated space for Black literature in South London, where children and readers can discover books reflecting their experiences and heritage. The festival has also worked with the Arts Council England, which featured Brown in a profile interview in 2024.

In 2024–25, the BBBF was awarded one of five inaugural "Beyond Literature Borders" grants by the British Council and Speaking Volumes, an international literature development fund designed to support cross-cultural literary exchange between the UK and countries across the Global South. The grant funded a Writers Programme delivered in partnership with the Jamaica Book Festival, consisting of a six-week digital fellowship for emerging Black writers of Jamaican heritage aged 18–35 from the UK and Jamaica, led by facilitator DD Armstrong with guest authors Ashley Hickson-Lovence and Earl Moxam. The fellowship brought together 24 writers across two time zones to explore themes of identity, heritage, migration and belonging through creative nonfiction. It culminated in the Fi Wi Time anthology, published in June 2025, featuring work by Claramae Flemming, Muminah Koleoso, Kareen Brooks, Kenloy Smith, Careese Hutchinson, Keenan Falconer, Dr. Maxine Meju, Llyrio Boateng, Hannah Adereti, Kerece "Lilanie" Williams, Shanese Oneida Whyte, and others, with forewords by DD Armstrong and Selina Brown.

== Awards and recognition ==
- 2024: Selina Brown named Leader of the Year at The Bookseller FutureBook Awards
- 2025: Brown named Trailblazer of the Year at the London Book Fair
- 2026: Brown awarded the inaugural Queen's Reading Room Medal (National Reading Hero) by Queen Camilla at Clarence House, in recognition of her work founding the BBBF and bringing inclusive stories into primary schools

== See also ==
- International Book Fair of Radical Black and Third World Books (1982–1995)
