= Bogle-L'Ouverture Publications =

London-based publishing company, founded 1969

- Founded: 1969; 57 years ago
- Founders: Jessica Huntley (1927–2013), Eric Huntley (1929–2026)
- Country of origin: UK
- Headquarters location: London
- Publication types: Non-fiction, fiction, poetry and children's books by Black writers

Bogle-L'Ouverture Publications (BLP) is a radical London-based publishing company founded by Guyanese activists Jessica Huntley (23 February 1927 – 13 October 2013) and Eric Huntley (25 September 1929 – 21 January 2026) in 1969, when its first title, Walter Rodney's The Groundings With My Brothers, was published. Named in honour of two prominent Afro-Caribbeans, Toussaint Louverture and Paul Bogle, the company began operating during a period in the UK when "books by Black authors or written with a sympathetic view of Black people's history and culture were rare in mainstream bookshops in the UK." Alongside New Beacon Books (founded in 1966) and Allison & Busby (founded in 1967), BLP was one of the first black-led independent publishing companies established in the UK. BLP has been described as "a small, unorthodox, self-financing venture that brought a radical perspective to non-fiction, fiction, poetry and children's books."

== History ==
The birth of Bogle-L'Ouverture Publications (BLP) was a direct response to the 1968 banning from Jamaica of historian and scholar Walter Rodney, who was then teaching at the University of the West Indies in Mona and outside the lecture halls had been sharing his knowledge and exchanging ideas with the island's working people, prompting the government's censure. Thousands of Jamaicans took to the streets protesting the ban and in London a group of concerned West Indians – the Huntleys, Richard Small, Ewart Thomas, Andrew Salkey and others – decided to challenge it by publishing and distributing Rodney's speeches and lectures. These were published in 1969 – with the encouragement of the existent black UK publishers John La Rose of New Beacon Books and Margaret Busby of Allison and Busby – as BLP's first title, The Groundings with My Brothers, financed by friends and community funding, and much reprinted. Speaking in 1979 at an event marking BLP's 10th anniversary, Jessica Huntley recalled: "It was a political position we took.... We barely made the money to pay the printer.... We just gave away a lot of copies to people so people must read it." The company went on also to become the original publisher (jointly with Tanzania Publishing House) in 1972 of Rodney's influential work How Europe Underdeveloped Africa.

Among other notable titles on the BLP list are Linton Kwesi Johnson's Dread Beat and Blood (1975), several books by Andrew Salkey (a director and long-time supporter of BLP), Beryl Gilroy's Black Teacher, Journey to an Illusion: The West Indian in Britain by Donald Hinds, and poetry collections by Valerie Bloom, Sam Greenlee, Lemn Sissay, Lucinda Roy, Imruh Bakari and John Lyons.

Bogle-L'Ouverture was also involved in educational interventions on behalf of Black children and parents – crucially highlighted in Bernard Coard's How the West Indian Child Is Made Educationally Subnormal in the British School System: The Scandal of the Black Child in Schools in Britain (New Beacon, 1971); as Gus John has written: "So, when in our work with young children we discovered that black children were typically drawing themselves as white, or expressing a preference for white dolls and seeing white friends as 'nicer' and more desirable, Jessica and Eric published the eye-catching and upbeat little colouring and story book Getting to Know Ourselves [by Bernard and Phyllis Coard, 1972]."

=== Bookshop ===
BLP initially functioned from the living-room of the Huntley home in West London, which additionally served as a bookshop where teachers could come to browse and buy, and became a meeting place that hosted "book launches and readings, political and social debates, with contributors from the Caribbean, Africa, US and Asia." (Early discussions out of which the Caribbean Artists Movement developed had also taken place in the Huntleys' home.) However, after a neighbour complained to the local authorities about the residential property being used for business purposes, the Huntleys were forced to move the office and sales activities.

In 1974, the Bogle-L'Ouverture Bookshop opened in Chignell Place, West Ealing; it "served the valuable function of stocking books about the Caribbean, Africa and the Third World, especially from publishers in the Caribbean", and was a cultural hub for the community: "Bogle-L'Ouverture also became a 'drop in centre' for parents, school students and teachers who came for guidance, for counselling and for direction with respect to issues concerning their studies, essays or theses they had to write, their job applications, employment, career prospects and/or their experience of racist institutional cultures or/and racist managers." Bogle regularly organised meetings, talks and readings at the bookshop with the participation of such eminent writers as Ntozake Shange, Louise Bennett, Farrukh Dhondy, Andrew Salkey, Sam Selvon, Kamau Brathwaite, Merle Hodge, Petronella Breinburg, Cecil Rajendra, and others.

=== Racist attacks and the aftermath ===
In 1977–79, the Bookshop was targeted for attack by racist groups, as were the few other outlets for radical material – including New Beacon Books, Grassroots and Headstart in London, as well as enterprises in Nottingham, Manchester and Birmingham — with abusive graffiti repeated daubed on the windows and doors, National Front literature and excrement pushed through the letterbox. Jessica Huntley recalled: "The National Front used to break windows. Then we got threatening calls. They gave us seven days to move, and if we didn't get out, what's going to happen. We got calls from the Ku Klux Klan. They were everywhere. And, of course, we had a campaign against that and our poster was, 'We Will Not Be Terrorised out of Existence'." The Huntleys with fellow bookshop owners formed a "Bookshop Joint Action" group to raise awareness of the attacks through producing leaflets, holding public meetings and picketing the Home Office, which eventually resulted in national media coverage that forced the police to take action.

Bogle-L'Ouverture met regularly with New Beacon Books and the Race Today collective as part of an ongoing alliance that was determined "to send a strong message to the racists: 'that they were not going to be intimidated and they would continue to publish and sell their books'. The final event would be a gala to celebrate Bogle-L'Ouverture Publications' 10th Anniversary." A "cultural extravaganza" was held at the Commonwealth Institute, compered by Carmen Munroe and featuring a variety of performers, poets, drummers, dancers and musicians including Misty in Roots, Keith Waithe, Cecil Rajendra, Linton Kwesi Johnson and others. Its success demonstrated "the potential for an event on this scale taking place in different parts of London and the UK on a regular basis. They discussed the idea of an annual book fair, which was later developed and eventually implemented as the International Book Fair of Radical Black and Third World Books, held between 1982 and 1995, of which Jessica Huntley was joint director with John La Rose until 1984.

=== Change of name ===
After Walter Rodney was assassinated in Guyana in 1980, the bookshop was renamed to honour him. Following changes in the publishing industry in the 1980s, when small independent publishers and booksellers faced often insurmountable competition from large multinational conglomerates, the Walter Rodney Bookshop was forced to close in 1990. Beset by financial difficulties, caused partly by overseas clients defaulting on payment, Bogle-L'Ouverture Publications could no longer publish using the original company imprint; however, the efforts of "Friends of Bogle", a loyal group of supporters, contributed to the Huntleys' ability to resume publishing as Bogle-L'Ouverture Press, once again operating from their own home.

== Legacy ==
An interactive installation by Michael McMillan recreated the Walter Rodney Bookshop as part of the Heritage Lottery Funded exhibition No Colour Bar: Black British Art in Action 1960–1990 at the Guildhall Art Gallery (July 2015 – January 2016), drawing inspiration from Bogle-L'Ouverture's output and the Huntley Archives held at the London Metropolitan Archives (LMA). Artists featured in the exhibition — which was described by Colin Prescod (chair of the Institute of Race Relations) as an "exposition of startling and radical imaginative works, addressing grand British cultural and historical matters, and touching on themes of existential and social restlessness" — include those on whose talents Bogle-L'Ouverture drew for its book jackets or for the posters, greetings cards and other artwork sold in the bookshop, such as Errol Lloyd and George "Fowokan" Kelly.

A blue plaque unveiled in October 2018 outside the Ealing home of Jessica Huntley and Eric Huntley commemorates their work in the founding of Bogle-L'Ouverture.

== Archives ==
In 2005, papers relating to the business of Bogle-L'Ouverture, together with documents concerning the personal, campaigning and educational initiatives of Eric and Jessica Huntley from 1952 to 2011, were the first major deposit of records from the African-Caribbean community in London presented to LMA, where they are available for research as part of the City of London's Black Community Archives.

=== Annual Huntley Conference ===
Since 2006, the Huntley Archives at LMA have inspired an annual conference on themes reflecting different elements of the content of the collection. The themes and keynote speakers to date have been:

- 2006 (1st) — "The Groundings with Bogle-L’Ouverture: A Story of Black Publishing". Keynote Speaker: Moira Stuart, OBE.
- 2007 (2nd) — "Writing the Wrongs: Fifty Years of Black Radical Publishing in Britain". Keynote Speaker: Margaret Busby, OBE.
- 2008 (3rd) — "Looking to Africa: Garvey, Rasta and Rodney". Keynote Speaker: Kwame Kwei-Armah, OBE.
- 2009 (4th) — "Remembering Walter Rodney, Revolutionary Pan-Africanist". Keynote Speaker: Dr Kimani Nehusi.
- 2010 (5th) — "Young, Black & British: Identity and Community through the generations". Keynote Speaker: Professor Aggrey Burke.
- 2011 (6th) — "Get Up! Stand Up! Campaigning for Rights, Respect and Self-Reliance". Keynote Speaker: Marc Wadsworth.
- 2012 (7th) — "Arts & Activism: Culture & Resistance". Keynote Speaker: Errol Lloyd, artist.
- 2013 (8th) — "Educating Our Children: Liberating Our Futures". Keynote Speaker: Professor Beverley Bryan, lecturer at the University of the West Indies, Mona, Jamaica.
- 2014 (9th) — "When They Were Young: Re-Searching Our Archives".
- 2015 (10th) — "Mountain High: Archive Deep".
- 2016 (11th) — "Animating Black Archives – the Next Ten Years".
- 2017 (12th) — "What's the New Radical? Deep Roots and New Shoots in Black Publishing"
- 2018 (13th) — "Art, Blackness, Identity and Activism | Rebooting the Legacy: No Colour Bar: Black British Art in Action 1960 – 1990". This was billed as being an "unconference" – in which participants were actively invited to contribute throughout the day.
- 2019 (14th) — "More than Words: 50 years of Bogle-L'Ouverture Publishing". Keynote Speaker: Carolyn Cooper, Professor Emerita, University of the West Indies, Mona, Jamaica.

=== Friends of the Huntley Archives at London Metropolitan Archives (FHALMA) ===
Friends of the Huntley Archives at London Metropolitan Archives (FHALMA) is a non-profit charitable foundation, run by volunteers, founded in 2013 with the aim of "bringing to life the narratives, histories and knowledge discovered in the archive materials found in the Huntley Collections" and promoting the heritage of the Caribbean and African Diaspora through education and community projects.

== See also ==
- New Beacon Books
- International Book Fair of Radical Black and Third World Books
- Margaret Busby – UK's first black female book publisher
