= Chung Kok Ming =

Malaysian Chinese Perak State councillor

Chung Kok Ming (Chinese: 鄭國明), also known as Chung Ah Ming, was a Malaysian Chinese Perak State councillor and the only Asian committee member of the Perak Turf Club for many years. He represented Perak State in soccer, hockey, cricket and tennis.

He was a member of the Perak State Council for many years, having first been appointed to fill the vacancy left by the resignation of his uncle, Chung Thye Phin. He was also a member of the Federal Council of the Federated Malay States.

He was the grandson of Chung Keng Quee and the son of Chung Thye Yong who was also known as Chung Ah Yong. His father had been famous for rugby and horse racing. Chung Kok Ming was one of the finest tennis players in the country. His regular doubles partner was Dr. K.T. Khong, another person of Penang origin who, while a student at Cambridge, rowed for his college. Horse racing was something he shared in common with his father. In 1926, the Perak Turf Club officially came into existence. The first Chairman of the Perak Turf Club was J C Osborne, Vice-Chairman was C.B. Redway and other members of the Committee were Chung Ah Ming, P.G. Short, K.R. Coullie, P.J. Roy Waugh and J. Whyte. Chung Ah Ming was the only Asian member of the Committee for many years. First Secretary of the Club was T.I. Brocklebank and the Club boasted a membership of 450.
