= Chung Thye Phin =

Chinese Malayan business magnate, planter, miner, bureaucrat and philanthropist

Kapitan Cina Chung Thye Phin
- 鄭大平 / 鄭太平
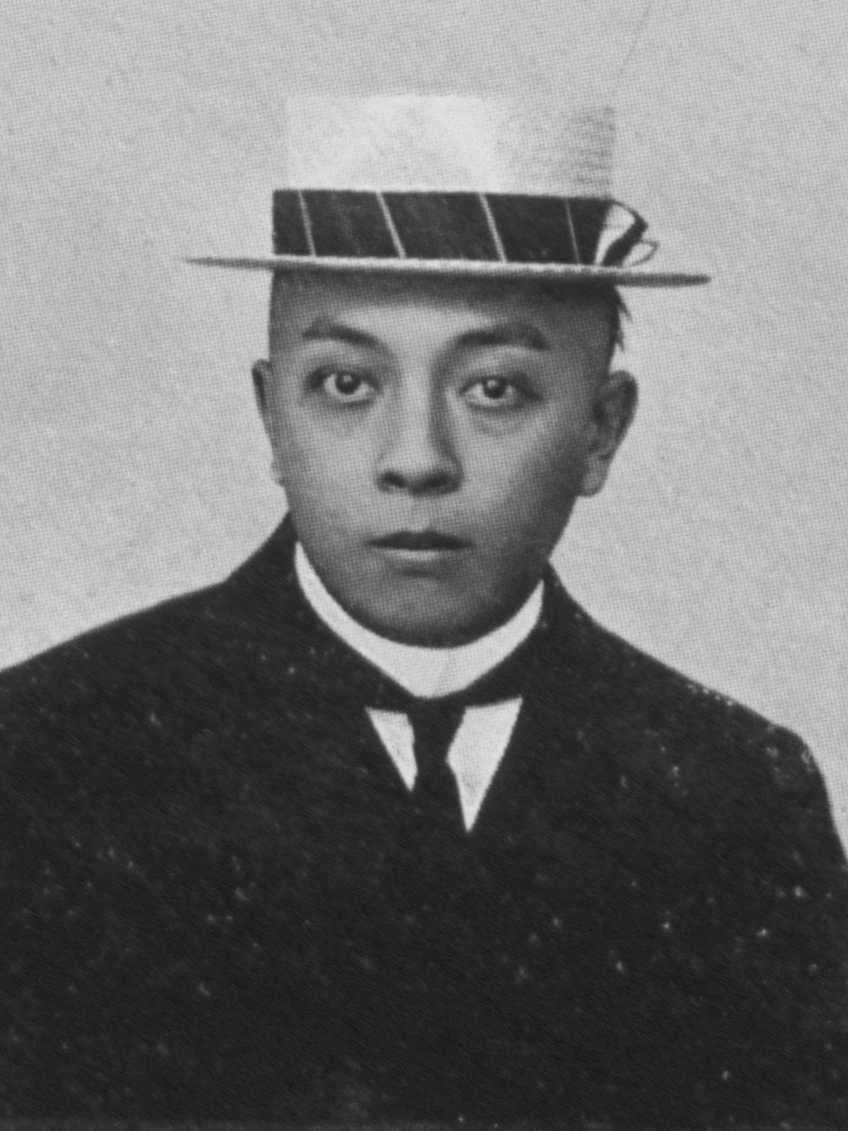

Kapitan Cina of Perak
- In office 1921 – 29 March 1935
- Preceded by: Khaw Boo Aun
- Succeeded by: Position abolished

Member of the State Council of Perak
- In office 22 October 1900 – 6 January 1927
- Preceded by: Chung Keng Quee
- Succeeded by: Chung Kok Ming

Personal details
- Born: 28 September 1879 Taiping, Perak Sultanate
- Died: 29 March 1935 (aged 55) George Town, Prince of Wales Island, Straits Settlements
- Resting place: Estate of Cheang Keng Kwee, Bagan Jermal, George Town
- Spouse: Mrs. Chung Thye Phin (d. 1924)
- Relations: Chung Thye Yong (brother); Chung Kok Ming (nephew)
- Parent(s): Chung Keng Quee (father); Foo Teng Nyong (mother)
- Education: St. Xavier's Institution
- Occupation: Bureaucrat, plantation and tin mining business magnate, landed proprietor and philanthropist

Chung Thye Phin MSC, JP (simplified Chinese: 郑大平 / 郑太平; traditional Chinese: 鄭大平 / 鄭太平; pinyin: Zhèng Dàpíng / Zhèng Tàipíng; 28 September 1879 – 29 March 1935) was a Chinese Malayan business magnate, planter, miner, bureaucrat, and philanthropist who served as the last Kapitan Cina of Perak and Malaya. He was reported to be the richest man in Penang.

The son of tin-mining magnate Chung Keng Quee, he was a pioneer in the tin-mining industry through the introduction of modern equipment and tin-mining techniques in Perak under Western assistance. He was also known for pioneering the cultivation of roselle fibre for the production of ropes and twines, with the creation of the Sweet Kamiri Estate at Sungai Siput.

In his later years, he was a member of the Perak Advisory Board, and eventually became the Kapitan China of Perak. He has been described by his contemporaries as one of the "best known residents of the Chinese community" in British Malaya.

== Early years ==
=== Early life ===
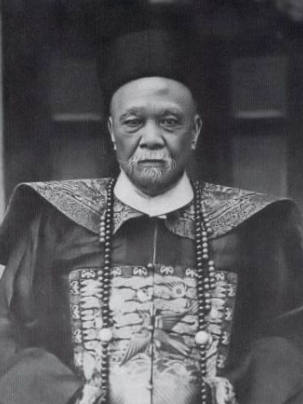
Chung Keng Quee, Kapitan China of Perak (1877–1901).

Chung Thye Phin was born in the village of Kota,Taiping, at the Perak Sultanate on 28 September 1879. He was the fourth son of Chinese tin-mining business magnate and philanthropist Chung Keng Quee (1827–1901) and Foo Teng Nyong (1849–1883), Chung's third wife. His name, Thye Phin (Chinese: 太平), was named after the town of Taiping. Chung had 9 brothers and 6 sisters, including Thye Yong, Thye Ngit, Thye Cheong and Thye Siong, and was an uncle of Chung Kok Ming. His godfather was Chin Seng Yam (d.1898), the leader of the Ghee Hin, a secret society opposed to the Hai San, another secret society led by his father due to tin-mining disputes. The rivalry eventually escalated into the Larut Wars (1865–1874), which ended in a Ghee Hin victory with the Pangkor Treaty of 1874. However, they were conferred the honorific titles of "Kapitan China".

Chung received his education at St. Xavier's College (St. Xavier's Institution) in George Town. In August 1897, he was subjected to international media attention when reports of him being robbed by armed bandits at Canton River surfaced. The robbery was carried out on a boat hired by Chung while in a trip to their "native lands". Armed with revolvers, Chung and several of his relatives were held hostage for 12 hours, and lost "$70,000 worth of jewellery and cash" in the process. In 1902, he was granted a certificate of naturalization by the government of the Straits Settlements, making him a British citizen.

== The tin man ==
An enterprising youth with a flair for progress, he later started a number of tin mines of his own, including a deep-shaft mine at Tronoh or Teronoh, adjoining the famous mine of the same name, and the hydraulic mine at Batu Tugoh. Tronoh was the centre of the mining field containing the mine of Chung Thye Phin's Tronoh Mines Company Ltd.

His open-cast mines were operated on the most modern system in his time. He had the distinction of being the first Chinese miner to have introduced the latest appliances on the mines, under the supervision of a European engineer.

In 1914 he was elected to the council of the F.M.S. Chamber of Mines.

Together with Ho Man and Foo Choong Nyit, Chung Thye Phin co-founded the Toh Allang Chinese Tin Company in Perak, the first Chinese limited liability company, in 1925. He was also a founder and member of the Board of Directors of the Eastern Smelting Company (1908), Ltd along with Eu Tong Sen, Ng Boo Bee, Ong Hung Chong, Khaw Joo Tok and his nephew Khaw Bian Kee. The Eastern Smelting Company, Penang was registered in August 1907, and in November that year, its prospectus was advertised in various newspapers offering shares to the public. Governor Sir John Anderson officiated at its opening in January 1908. The company appeared to be doing well and at its first ordinary general meeting in October that year a 5 per cent dividend was declared based on the good performance of the prior six months work. Problems arose the following year and by the end of it its works manager had resigned, accusing the managing director and other directors of financial mismanagement. By March 1911 it had been decided to sell off the business to a London company. Newspapers in July 1911 carried the prospectus of the new London-based company that was to acquire the business of the Malayan company. The chairmanship of the London-based public company was Chung Thye Phin's old friend, former British Resident, Sir Ernest Birch. By the end of November 1911 the transfer from old to new company had been completed and the first general meeting of the new London-based company took place. Ownership by the London-company of the Penang-company became complete with the liquidation of the Penang public company.

In 1907 he convened a public meeting held at his offices attended by leading miners and other prominent residents to discuss problems that could arise as a result of the construction of the proposed Tronoh Railway and calling for a memorandum to be sent to the government to postpone the letting of contracts until a full public enquiry could be taken.

He was also active in promoting tin mining and the latest tin mining technologies available at the time.

== Revenue farmer ==
He also had vast interests in some of the Government revenue farm monopolies. On 2 July 1903, the public tenders were declared open for the running of the Kedah and Penang Opium Farms. There were eight tenders. The highest tender was made by Chung Thye Phin for the Penang farm at $260,000 a month.

An understanding was reached that: (i) the government cut the Penang opium farm from the $260,000 a month tendered by Chung Thye Phin to $220,000 (later reduced to $217,000), and agreed that the syndicate could have both the Penang and Kedah farms at an overall price of $260,000 per month; (ii) Gan Ngoh Bee could have half the farm, but the other half should go to Chung Thye Phin, whose tender was the highest; and (iii) the government would undertake to secure the Kedah farm on behalf of the Penang syndicate at $40,000 a month with one-to-three months' deposits.

== Public life ==
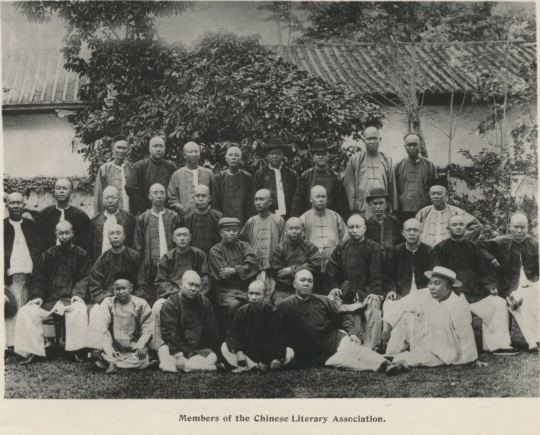
Members of the Penang Chinese Literary Association, Malaya, 1897.

Chung Thye Phin was a committee member of the Penang Chinese Chamber of Commerce (檳城華人商部局) which was founded in June 1903 and before that served as a President of the Penang Chinese Town Hall (平章公館) established in 1881. At one time he even led the Penang Chinese Literary Association.

He was a director of the Straits Echo.

Despite his many business concerns, Chung Thye Phin evinced a lively interest in various philanthropic works, foreign famine funds and local charities.

In 1904 he subscribed (1,000) to the building fund for the founding of the Seven States Medical School. At a Chinese concert at Ipoh in 1908 in aid of the Canton famine fund he paid $100 for a plate of ice cream.

According to a deed dating back to 1906, he was one of the trustees of the Penang Chinese Recreation Club.

During the financial depression in Perak in 1908 he was one of the four members of a deputation (the other three being Eu Tong Sen, Foo Choo Choon and Yau Tet Shin) appointed by the whole of the Chinese community in Perak to plead their plight and bring to the attention of the acting resident of Perak, Mr E L Brockman their requests for government aid.

He donated a fountain to the Penang Turf Club. This still exists today. Together with Eu Tong Sen he donated land in Papan for a jail. This same pair contributed $1,500 to the Perak Chinese Recreation Club in 1913.

This worthy scion of Kapitan Chung, Keng Quee was the recipient of a tasseled "gold medal" from the Government of Indo China (Annam) for his liberal gifts to the Relief Fund. (Vide "The Chung Family Record", op. cit., pp. 9–12)

He appears in the 1904 List of Qualified Jurors. He was just 25 years of age at that time.

He was a member of the board of governors of the Yuk Choy school in Ipoh which began Standard 5 and 6 classes in 1908.

He was made a Justice of the Peace in 1917.

He was appointed in March 1918, by Sir Arthur Henderson Young to be a member of the Federal Council of the Federated Malay States during the temporary absence of the Honourable Mr. Eu Tong Sen.

He also served as a member of the Commission to enquire into and report on the Mining Industry, for which all the members were thanked by Mr. E. L. Brockman, Chief Secretary, F. M. S., for "the thoroughness with which you have gone into the various and important points raised and the clearness with which the conclusion arrived at regarding them have been recorded". (K. L., F. M. S. Correspondence Ref: No. 508-1919 dated 29 January 1920)

In October 1920 he was appointed President of the Chinese Widow's and Orphan's Institution, Perak at its seventeenth annual general meeting in Ipoh.

Earlier that year he was part of a deputation, also comprising the Hon. Mr A N Kenion, the Hon. Mr J H Rich, Messrs. F S Physick, Herbert Cooper, C F Green, Chairman, Sanitary Board, Kinta and Cheang Heng Thoy, J. P., who met with the Hon. Mr W George Maxwell, C.M.G. British Resident of Perak to discuss Ipoh's electricity and lighting needs.

He was elected representative vice president of the Garden Club for Penang, a position he was re-elected to for a number of years.

On 24 March 1921, His Highness Iskandar Shah K. C. M. G., the Sultan of Perak, with the advice of Colonel W. J. P. Hume, British Resident, Perak, conferred on him the title of "Kapitan China", in all probability, the last of the Chinese Kapitans in Malaya. He was installed by the Sultan of Perak in Kuala Kangsar amidst much traditional pomp and pageantry. His appointment was so popular with the community that he was escorted to Kuala Kangsar by the delegates of more than 70 Chinese organisations from Perak.

Later that year he was invited to Kuala Lumpur to give his views to the Trade Depression Commission during its two days' sitting in camera.

He was appointed trustee of the resuscitated Perak Miners' and Planters' association in 1922.

In July 1923 he was elected the first president of the newly inaugurated British Chinese Association. In November 1923, at the annual general meeting of the Perak Chinese Dramatic Club, he was elected Patron.

He presided over the Association of States and Straits Representatives (representing Chinese born in the Federated Malay States and the Straits Settlements) in 1923.

In 1926, together with Leong Sin Nam he was elected an honorary member of the Ipoh Club, whose members till then were restricted to the European community. The Times of Malaya said this was a compliment which should further cement the good feeling existing between the European and Chinese communities in Kinta.

In the name of His Majesty the King, His Excellency the High Commissioner awarded him a Certificate of Honour in recognition of his loyal and valuable services to the government of the F. M. S. in June 2007. He was presented the Malayan Certificate of Honour and its accompanying insignia by the Chief Secretary, F. M. S., Sir William Peel, in the throne room at Istana Nagara, Kuala Kangsar in August 1928, having received the same award on the occasion of H. M. the King-Emperor's birthday the year before.

According to berita.perak.gov.my, Foo Yet Kai, another Perak philanthropist, bought Chung Thye Phin's villa in Ipoh from the family of the late Kapitan and later gave permission for it to be converted into a private hospital, then known as Our Lady's Hospital and run by the Franciscan Sisters from Salzkotten, Germany. The hospital subsequently was renamed Kinta Medical Centre in the 1980s when the Foo Yet Kai Foundation took over the administration.

In 1905 together with a few others, he maintained 'Seng Kee' a Mess patronized by wealthy miners and merchants including Foo Choo Choon with whom he had familial and business relations.

== The sportsman ==
It is known that he owned expensive cars, prize-winning horses, and even issued his own currency for use in his mines.

Motoring was one of his passions.

Chung Thye Phin was an avid sportsman. He found particular success in horse racing, winning the prestigious Blue Ribbon of the Straits Turf on multiple occasions, along with numerous other events. His racing trophies include a 1905 Singapore Derby win with his horse, Devilment. He was also a skilled billiards player.

He was also said to be a first class billiard player and played an exhibition match with world billiard champion John Roberts at the E&O Hotel in the early 1900s.

== Minting his own money ==
At one time, during the latter part of the first World War, he was among the few who were permitted by the Government to print and issue 10-cent notes for circulation. Chung Thye Phin first issued private banknotes in 10 cent denominations on 11 February 1918. These notes were only circulated within his mining concessions and the Kapitan's trading outlets at Phin Kee Chan in Ipoh and were used by large numbers of labourers in the mining areas in exchange for goods (Source: Museum Numismatik Maybank). No other denominations have been discovered. Circa 1918 the notes bear the legends Ten Cents "Phin Kee Chan Ten Cents" at top and bottom border and "Phin Kee Chan" at left and right border. The legend Chung Thye Phin was printed in a black panel diagonally. On the top left corner is a value of "10cents" and written in Chinese on the right is "bearer of this bill may exchange 10c from Phin Kee Chan". Embossed on it was an oval seal bearing the legend of Chung Thye Phin.

== Held up by pirates on the Canton River ==
In 1897, during a trip to China, he found himself and his entourage held up by pirates. What's perhaps even more surprising is that more than a few United States newspapers carried the following story about this son of Malaya:

"Tacoma, Wash., August 30. – The steamer Columbia, from Yokohama, brings Oriental advices up to July 27. News has just reached Hong Kong of the prevalence of pirates on the Canton River and one of the most daring outrages perpetrated. One of the sons of Capt. Chung Kewi, a Straits millionaire, Chung Ah Phin, was the victim. With a few of his relatives he hired a boat and they were proceeding to their native place. On the second day the boat stuck in the mud and could not proceed. During the night a gang of men with painted faces and fully armed boarded the boat. With revolvers leveled at the passengers they commanded silence, while four men began at once to look for plunder. Ah Phin brought from the Straits jewelry amounting in value to $50,000 and $20,000 in cash. These the pirates took, besides clothing, etc. They left, after threatening the victims with instant death if they made a noise till twelve hours afterwards. In the morning information was sent down to Canton, but before the authorities had time to get a gunboat up the river the pirates had made their escape."

== Architectural memorials ==
Chung Thye Phin Building, 14 Station Road in Ipoh, Perak is a three-storey corner building from 1907. It originally housed the Medical Hall established by Dr. R.M. Connolly, the Oilfileds Dispensaries Ltd. and more recently the George Town Dispensary. Mr W. Cecil Payne, managing director of the Times of Malaya and a member of the Institute of Incorporated Accountants, had offices in Chung Thye Phin's buildings.

Apart from Phin Kee Chan (referred to by many other names, among them the Chung Thye Phin Building), he is also associated with his father's townhouse cum office in Penang, Hye Kee Chan, and with some other structures, like his country house on Dummond Hill in Taiping, Perak.

His villa in the heart of Ipoh, was bought by Foo Yet Kai who later allowed its conversion, free of rent, to a private hospital, then known as Our Lady’s Hospital. It was administered by the Sisters of the Franciscan Missionaries of the Divine Motherhood from April 1964 to Jan 1983 but has now been taken over by The Kinta Medical Centre.

The Chung Thye Phin Mansion at Gurney Drive on Penang island (the address at the time was No 2 Kelawai Road) with its subterranean passageways and chambers was, after his death, sold and turned into a hotel (The Shanghai Hotel) in the late 1930s but was later demolished in 1964 and on its footprint now stands an imposing condominium (1 Gurney Drive). Author Queeny Chang gives an extensive description of the place and her experience of it in her autobiography. At one time it served to house a club for German U-boatmen.

He designed Relau Villa (also on Penang island), his holiday resort with a swimming pool ringed by private and other types of rooms. Its derelict structure can still be seen and explored at Taman Metropolitan, Relau in Penang, today. According to family history Kapitan Chung Thye Phin was inspired by the artistic canals of Venice and the enchanting ponds and lakes of China when he designed the swimming-pool, which was constructed by Mr. B. H. Ung (Ung Ban Hoe was attached to the architectural firm of Stark & McNeil), the first Chinese architect who introduced reinforced concrete buildings to the community, notably the Ban Hin Lee Bank.

A commentary by his grand daughter, Oola goes, "Chung Thye Phin had many residences, some of them mansions, in Penang, Ipoh and Taiping. His residence in what is now Persiaran Gurney was the most famous, with its grand entertaining rooms and undersea wing. It was built before there was a Persiaran Gurney or a Gurney Drive, and was therefore right on the shore. His largest residence in Ipoh was in a street that carried his name (and still does). This mansion now serves as a hospital. He built a summer house on a large estate near Relau and surrounded it with gardens, orchards and fish ponds. However its most striking feature was the fact that it was built around a swimming pool (the first in Penang) in the Roman tradition. This house still exists in its ruined state, now surrounded by high rise 21st century flats. There are indeed many stories to be told about Chung Thye Phin."

He also had property on Penang Hill, as was the way with the rich in those days. His was a bungalow named, simply, "Highlands".

Several articles have been published, mentioning these properties and erroneously attributing them to Thye Phin's father, Chung Keng Quee who died in 1901, well before any of these were built.

== The traveller ==
Chung Thye Phin traveled internationally for business and leisure. During one trip, he traveled the gorges of the Yangtze River at Chongqing, China. He was the first Chinese person born outside of China to make this journey.

== A road in his honour ==
In Perak he was honoured with roads named after him. Jalan Chung Thye Phin in Ipoh borders the Kinta Medical Centre. This location is appropriate – the Centre, a private hospital under the administration of the Foo Yet Kai foundation, was formerly the family mansion of Chung Thye Phin. There is another road of the same name also named in his honour in his birthplace of Taiping.

== Well connected ==
Chung Thye Phin rubbed shoulders with the rich and powerful including Sultan Iskandar Shah of Perak, a polo lover. A photograph in the National Archives shows him sitting next to the Sultan.

He was among the group of Chinese towkays who presented the address to King George V when he visited Singapore in 1901 as Duke of Cornwall.

In February 1907 When the Duke and the Duchess of Connaught and Princess Patricia paid an official visit to Penang in Feb. 1907, they were driven by Kapitan Chung Thye Phin in his own private car.

In 1921 he feted Sir Ernest Woodford Birch at his Ipoh residence having invited all the old residents of Perak, European and Chinese.

== Chung, Thye Phin and Eu, Tong Sen ==
Eu Tong Sen and Chung Thye Phin were "blood" brothers. They went through Chinese ceremony to become "Keet Bye Heng Tai". When Chung Thye Phin travelled to Hong Kong, he stayed in Eu Tong Sen's villa there and they kept an account of his expenses in the company's account books. Eu Tong Sen's villa in HK was called "Eucliff". It has been torn down. It was built at Repulse Bay, HK, overlooking the sea. The property was huge. It was built with stone like a castle. It included within its walled area a tennis court and also a swimming pool.

Eu Tong Sen and Chung Thye Phin had common interests – motorcars, racehorses, country houses, etc. 1903 when the Ipoh Gymkhana Club was founded, both of them decided to enter their thoroughbreds regularly in the Ipoh races. They jointly built a weekend retreat, "Forest Lodge", at Gopeng Road with a large stable. In April 1912 Eu Tong Sen was appointed the permanent Chinese Member of the Federal Council, the seat having fallen vacant on the demise of Leong Fee. Chung Thye Phin sold his half-share to Eu Tong Sen who desired grander accommodations following the latter's elevation in status. Chung Thye Phin in turn bought Drummond’s Hill in Taiping, a 50-acre (200,000 m^{2}) estate and the former Residency of Sir Hugh Low. In 1908, together with Chung Thye Phin he built a large Chinese theatre in the important mining town of Kampar near Ipoh.

Chung, Thye Phin's Penang firms served as the agent for Eu, Tong Sen in Penang before he (Eu) opened a branch on the island. Eu Tong Sen's Penang branch, at least according to business directories, was the latest in his branch office network. It seemed to have opened only in 1920.

== Education and official appointments ==
He studied at St. Xavier's Institution on Penang Island. He was a patron of the Khek Community Guild (Singapore). He was appointed trustee of the Penang Tseng-Lung Hui-kuan in 1916 and tasked with overhauling the association, removing irresponsible elements from the association and repairing its premises. He also played an important role in the administration of the country, and was both a State Councillor and a Federal Councillor. He was a member of the Perak State Advisory Board and the last Kapitan China of Perak and Malaya. In 1900 he replaced his father as member of the Perak State Council, a position held by Chung Keng Quee since the council was first formed in 1877 and remained on the council till his resignation in 1927. On 24 March 1921, His Highness Iskandar Shah K. C. M. G., the Sultan of Perak, conferred on him the title of "Kapitan China". His installation ceremony was held on 28 March in the royal town of Kuala Kangsar and included a procession that went around the town, accompanied by firecrackers.

== Personal life ==
He was the son of Kapitan Chung Keng Quee (also spelt as Chung Ah Kwee) an immigrant from China. He had 7 wives but was survived by 6 of them who gave him 10 sons and 7 daughters. Chung Thye Phin was born in 1879 in Taiping, lived most of his life in Penang and died in 1935.

Sons:
Chung, Kok Soon (KS, deceased 2006)
Chung, Kok Ching (KC, deceased 1994)
Chung, Kok Choon (Peter, deceased 1996)
Chung, Kok Heng (Frankie deceased)
Chung, Kok Khen (Khen, deceased 2006)
Chung, Kok En (Dennis, deceased 2014)
Chung, Kok Tong (Henry, deceased 2001)
Chung, Kok Leong (Leon, deceased 2014)
Chung, Kok Choy (Kenny, deceased 2005)
Chung, Kok Chuan (George, deceased 2009)

Daughters:
Chung, Yuet See (Mary, deceased 1995)
Chung, Yuet Kuen (Louise, deceased)
Chung, Guat Hooi
Chung, Guat Hong
Chung, Guat Kheng
Chung, Yuet Wah
Chung, Yuet Fong

== Quotations ==
Mr. Chung Thye Phin, M.C. (owner of mines in Gopeng, Taiping, and Tronoh districts): "I do not look for any general expansion of the industry. We are now greatly troubled with our coolies, who are independent and desert freely. In view of these labour troubles, I have installed tramming services where possible, and lengthened the working day."

== Sources ==
=== Notes ===
1. Re-examination of the "Chinese nationalism" and Categorization of the Chinese in Malaya: The Case of the Chinese in Penang, 1890s–1910s by SHINOZAKI Kaori, Ph.D. student, Graduate School of Arts and Sciences University of Tokyo
2. The Singapore and Straits Directory and the F.M.S. Directory under Eu Tong Sen.
3. Mr Koh, Keng We co author of Chinese Enterprise in Colonial Malaya: the Case of Eu Tong Sen
4. THE KAPITAN SYSTEM – XI Sunday Gazette, 19 June 1960, By Wu Liu (pen name of Mr. C. S. Wong/Wong, Choon Sang)
5. A gallery of Chinese kapitans. by Mr. C. S. Wong/Wong, Choon Sang; Published in Singapore: Ministry of Culture, 1963. 114p. [DS596 Won]
6. Twentieth Century impressions of British Malaya: its history, people, commerce, industries, and resources, by Arnold Wright, Published 1908 – Page 130, 203, 252, 262, 508, 509, 568
7. The Record of Meritorious Deeds of the Chung Family, op. cit., pp. 9–12
8. K. L. F. M. S. Correspondence Ref: No 3663-1917 dated 20 March 1918
9. K. L., F. M. S. Correspondence Ref: No. 508-1919 dated 29 January 1920
10. "Miscellaneous Chronicles of Penang", Kuang, Kuo-hsiang op. cit., pp. 112–113
11. The Case of the Chinese in Penang, 1890s–1910s | SHINOZAKI Kaori, Ph.D. student
12. 200 years of the Hakkas in Penang (檳城客家兩百年) By the Federation of Hakka Associations of Malaysia
13. Reveal the True Face of Secret Societies (揭開私會黨真面目) Written by Guo Rende (郭仁德) Published by the Malaysian Chinese Cultural Center
14. "The Luxuriant Tree" and "Chung Keng Kwee, the Hakka Kapitan" by CHUNG Yoon-Ngan (鄭永元)
15. The installation of Chung Thye Phin as Capitan in 1921. G.1784 (N.22/84) National Archives of Malaysia.
16. List of Qualified Jurors, Penang, 1904 transcribed from the Straits Settlements Government Gazette, 23 December 1904.
17. Heritage Road named in honour of Chung Thye Phin by Sita Ram, Stories Of Yesteryear, The Ipoh Echo 16–31 March 2006
18. Timothy Tye who has been researching Chung Keng Quee for AsiaExplorers and historian Khoo Salma Nasution
19. The Tin Resources of the British Empire by Norman Mosley Penzer, published by W. Rider in 1921, page 90 of 716 pages.
20. Chinese Architecture in the Straits Settlements and Western Malaya: Temples, Kongsis, and Houses By David Kohl – Originally published as the author's thesis (M.A.--University of Hong Kong, 1978) – Published by Heinemann Asia, 1984. ISBN 967-925-066-0, ISBN 978-967-925-066-4
21. Chinese Business in Southeast Asia: Contesting Cultural Explanations, Researching Entrepreneurship By H. Hsiao, Edmund Terence Gomez, Xinhuang Xiao, Hsin-Huang Michael Hsiao, Published by Routledge, 2001, ISBN 0-7007-1415-4, ISBN 978-0-7007-1415-5
22. Journal of the Malayan Branch of the Royal Asiatic Society (Vol. 3, pt. 2 comprises a monograph entitled: British Malaya, 1864–1867, by L.A. Mills, with appendix by C. O. Blagden, 1925. Issued also separately) By Royal Asiatic Society of Great Britain and Ireland Malayan Branch Published by The Branch, 1923
