= Valerie Sinason =

British psychoanalyst

- Occupations: Poet, writer, psychotherapist
- Known for: Treatment of the developmentally disabled; advocacy for the existence of satanic ritual abuse

Valerie Sinason is a British poet, writer, psychoanalyst and psychotherapist who is known for promoting the idea that people with a developmental disability can benefit from psychoanalysis and also that satanic ritual abuse is widely practiced in the UK. She ran the workshop dealing with intellectual disability at the Tavistock Clinic for twenty years and also worked for 16 years as a consultant research psychotherapist at St George's Hospital Medical School. She is a Trustee of the Institute for Psychotherapy and Disability.

== Psychoanalysis and the developmentally disabled ==
Since 1979, Sinason has claimed that severely developmentally-disabled people benefit by psychoanalysis. She saw her patients as having a secondary handicap resulting from their attempts to adapt to society's attitudes toward them.

== Satanic ritual abuse ==
In 1994, Sinason edited a collection of essays entitled Treating Survivors of Satanist Abuse that claimed satanic ritual abuse existed in the United Kingdom and that she had treated victims. Satanic ritual abuse is now considered to be a moral panic. Despite this and a three-year Department of Health inquiry by the anthropologist Jean La Fontaine into 84 alleged cases of ritual abuse that found no evidence to support such claims, Sinason claimed in 2001 and 2002 she had clinical evidence for the widespread practice of satanic ritual abuse in the United Kingdom. Her own report on the topic, prepared with colleague Robert Hale, was funded as a pilot study by the Department of Health. It was released to the public under the Freedom of Information Act, and the Department of Health stated in response to an inquiry by a reporter that they do not believe the Sinason-Hale report rendered LaFontaine's report invalid. LaFontaine commented on the story saying "It is not surprising to me that patients who are having treatment by Valerie Sinason would produce stories that echo such topical issues as the recent trial for receiving internet pornography and the publicity for the film Hannibal. There is good research that shows the "memories" of abuse are produced in and by the therapy."

However, others disagree (Herman 1993) stating it is unlikely that reputable therapists would plant unexpected criminal accounts in the clients’ minds or that they would even be able to, either by suggestive techniques (McFarlane & Lockerbie, 1994) or leading questions (Sakheim & Devine, 1992). Attachment theory shows that it is normal to automatically defend those one is close to from attack, and in this case the attack is dangerous stories of parental Satanic Ritual Abuse, incest or paedophilia (Bloom, 1994). They would therefore be most likely to be rejected. To see how easy it would be to plant such ideas in clients’ minds, the Gudjonsson Suggestibility Scale was administered to Satanic Ritual Abuse survivors. The results showed they were low in suggestibility (Leavitt, 1997) so unlikely to succumb to suggestive techniques. Common sense also dictated that the idea of thousands of registered therapists, mental health professionals and law enforcement personnel throughout the US, England, Canada, Europe, Australia, and New Zealand all at the same time implanting similarly untrue accounts of SRA in their clients, with matching codes, torture and results, stretches the bounds of credibility (Barstow, 1993).

== Bibliography ==
- Sinason, Valerie (2011). Attachment, Trauma and Multiplicity: Working with Dissociative Identity Disorder. New York: Routledge. ISBN 978-0-415-49179-2.
- Sinason, V (2010). Mental Handicap and the Human Condition: An Analytic Approach to Intellectual Disability (2nd ed.). Free Association Books. ISBN 978-1-85343-202-6.
- Memory in dispute, 2018.
- The Truth about Trauma and Dissociation: Everything You Didn't Want to Know and Were Afraid to Ask, Karnac Books, 2020.
- Mental handicap and the human condition: an analytic approach to intellectual disability, Free association books, 2010.
- Mental handicap and the human condition: new approach by the Tavistock, Free association books, 1992.
- Understanding your handicapped child, firefly books, 1997.
- Night shift: New poems by Valerie Sinason, 1995.
- The Psychotherapist and the Professional Complaint: The Shadow Side of Therapy, Karnac Books, 2023.
