= Walter Rodney =

Guyanese politician, activist and historian (1942–1980)

- Born: Walter Anthony Rodney; 23 March 1942; Georgetown, British Guiana
- Died: 13 June 1980 (aged 38); Georgetown, Guyana
- Cause of death: Car bomb

Academic background
- Education: University College of the West Indies; SOAS, University of London

Academic work
- Main interests: African studies
- Notable works: How Europe Underdeveloped Africa (1972)
- Website: www.walterrodneyfoundation.org

Walter Anthony Rodney (23 March 1942 – 13 June 1980) was a Guyanese historian, political activist and academic. His notable works include How Europe Underdeveloped Africa, first published in 1972. He was assassinated in Georgetown, Guyana, in 1980.

== Early life and career ==
Walter Anthony Rodney was born in 1942 into a working-class family in Georgetown, Guyana. He attended the University College of the West Indies in 1960 and was awarded a first-class honours degree in history in 1963. He earned a PhD in African History in 1966 at the School of Oriental and African Studies in London, England, at the age of 24. His dissertation, which focused on the slave trade on the Upper Guinea Coast, was published by Oxford University Press in 1970 under the title A History of the Upper Guinea Coast 1545–1800 and was widely acclaimed for its originality in challenging the conventional wisdom on the topic.

Rodney travelled widely and became known internationally as an activist, scholar and formidable orator. He taught at the University of Dar es Salaam in Tanzania during the periods 1966–67 and 1969–1974 and in 1968 at his alma mater University of the West Indies at Mona, Jamaica. He was sharply critical of the middle class for its role in the post-independence Caribbean. He was also a strong critic of capitalism and argued that only under "the banner of Socialism and through the leadership of the working classes" could Africa break from imperialism.

On 15 October 1968, the government of Jamaica, led by Prime Minister Hugh Shearer, declared Rodney persona non grata. The decision to ban him from ever returning to Jamaica and his subsequent dismissal by the University of the West Indies, Mona, caused protests by students and the poor of West Kingston that escalated into a riot, known as the Rodney riots, resulting in six deaths and causing millions of dollars in damages. The riots, which began on 16 October 1968, triggered an increase in political awareness across the Caribbean, especially among the Afrocentric Rastafarian sector of Jamaica, documented in Rodney's book The Groundings with my Brothers, published by Bogle-L'Ouverture Publications in 1969.

In 1969, Rodney returned to the University of Dar es Salaam. He was promoted to senior lecturer there in 1971 and promoted to associate professor in 1973. He worked at the university until 1974 when he returned to Guyana. He was promised a professorship at the University of Guyana in Georgetown but the Forbes Burnham government rescinded the offer when Rodney arrived in Guyana.

Rodney was close to C.L.R. James, among others, and supported the socialist government of Julius Nyerere. While his academic work contributed "to the emergence of decolonised African social sciences", Rodney worked to disseminate knowledge in Tanzanian villages, where he spoke in Kiswahili, the language of the people. He continued his pan-African activism and, analysing the causes of the continent's underdevelopment, published How Europe Underdeveloped Africa in 1972. With a view to the Pan-African Congress of 1974, he prepared a text on the "international class struggle in Africa, the Caribbean and America". In the landmark work, Rodney denounced leaders who, like Félix Houphouët-Boigny, Jean-Claude Duvalier, Idi Amin Dada and Joseph Mobutu, were turning to tribalism under the guise of "negritude".

Rodney became a prominent Pan-Africanist and Marxist and was important in the Black Power movement in the Caribbean and North America. While living in Dar es Salaam, he was influential in developing a new centre of African learning and discussion.

=== Later life ===
In 1974, Rodney returned to Guyana from Tanzania. He was due to take up a position as a professor at the University of Guyana, but the Guyanese government prevented his appointment. Increasingly active in politics, he joined the Working People's Alliance (WPA), a party that provided the most effective and credible opposition to the People's National Congress government and aimed to "create political consciousness, replacing ethnic politics with revolutionary organisations based on class solidarity". In 1979, he was arrested and charged with arson after two government offices were burned. The trial was deferred three times and the charges later dropped for lack of evidence.

== Death ==
On 13 June 1980, Rodney was killed in Georgetown, at the age of 38, by an explosive communication device in his car, a month after he had returned from celebrations of independence in Zimbabwe during a time of intense political activism. He was survived by his wife, Patricia, and three children. His brother, Donald Rodney, who was injured in the explosion, said that a sergeant in the Guyana Defence Force and a member of the House of Israel, named Gregory Smith, had given Walter the explosive that killed him. After the killing, Smith fled to French Guiana, where he died in 2002. The British politician Samuel Silkin stated in 1979 that he found Rodney "to be a deeply intelligent and compassionate man, with a hatred of bloodshed but a deep and growing fear that violence and civil war might be the inevitable consequence of Burnham's determination to hold on to power by all available means".

It is widely believed but not proven that the assassination was set up by the Guyanese President. The Guyanese Government, led by Linden Forbes Burnham, was found liable for Rodney’s death in the 2017 Commission of Inquiry. Rodney believed that the various ethnic groups that were historically disenfranchised by the ruling colonial class should work together, a position that challenged Forbes Burnham's hold on power.

In 2014, a Commission of Inquiry (COI) was held during which a new witness, Holland Gregory Yearwood, came forward claiming to be a long-standing friend of Rodney and a former member of the WPA. Yearwood testified that Rodney had presented detonators to him weeks prior to the explosion asking for assistance in assembling a bomb. However, the same Commission of Inquiry concluded in its report that Rodney's death had been a state-ordered killing and that then Prime Minister Forbes Burnham must have had knowledge of the plot.

Donald Rodney, Walter's brother, was in the car with him during the time of the assassination and was convicted in 1982 of possessing explosives in connection with the incident that had killed his brother. On 14 April 2021, the Guyana Court of Appeals overturned the judgment and Donald's sentence and exonerated him after forty years in which he contested his conviction.

On 9 August 2021, the National Assembly of Guyana voted to adopt "Resolution No. 23" to implement the 2016 findings of "The Commission of Inquiry Appointed to Enquire and Report on the Circumstances Surrounding the Death in An Explosion of the Late Dr. Walter Rodney on Thirteenth Day of June, One Thousand, Nine Hundred and Eighty at Georgetown".

== Academic influence ==
Rodney's most influential book is How Europe Underdeveloped Africa, published in 1972 by Bogle-L'Ouverture Publications, London, England and the Tanzanian Publishing House (TPH) Dar es Salaam Tanzania. In it, Rodney described how Africa had been exploited by European imperialists, which he argued led directly to the modern underdevelopment of most of the continent. The book became influential and controversial. It was groundbreaking in that it was among the first to bring a new perspective to the question of underdevelopment in Africa. Rodney's analysis went far beyond the previously accepted approach in the study of Third World underdevelopment.

Rodney's community-grounded approach to mass education during the 1960s and his detailed descriptions of his pedagogical approach in Groundings (1969) document his role as an important critical pedagogue and contemporary of Paulo Freire.

== Honours, awards and legacy ==
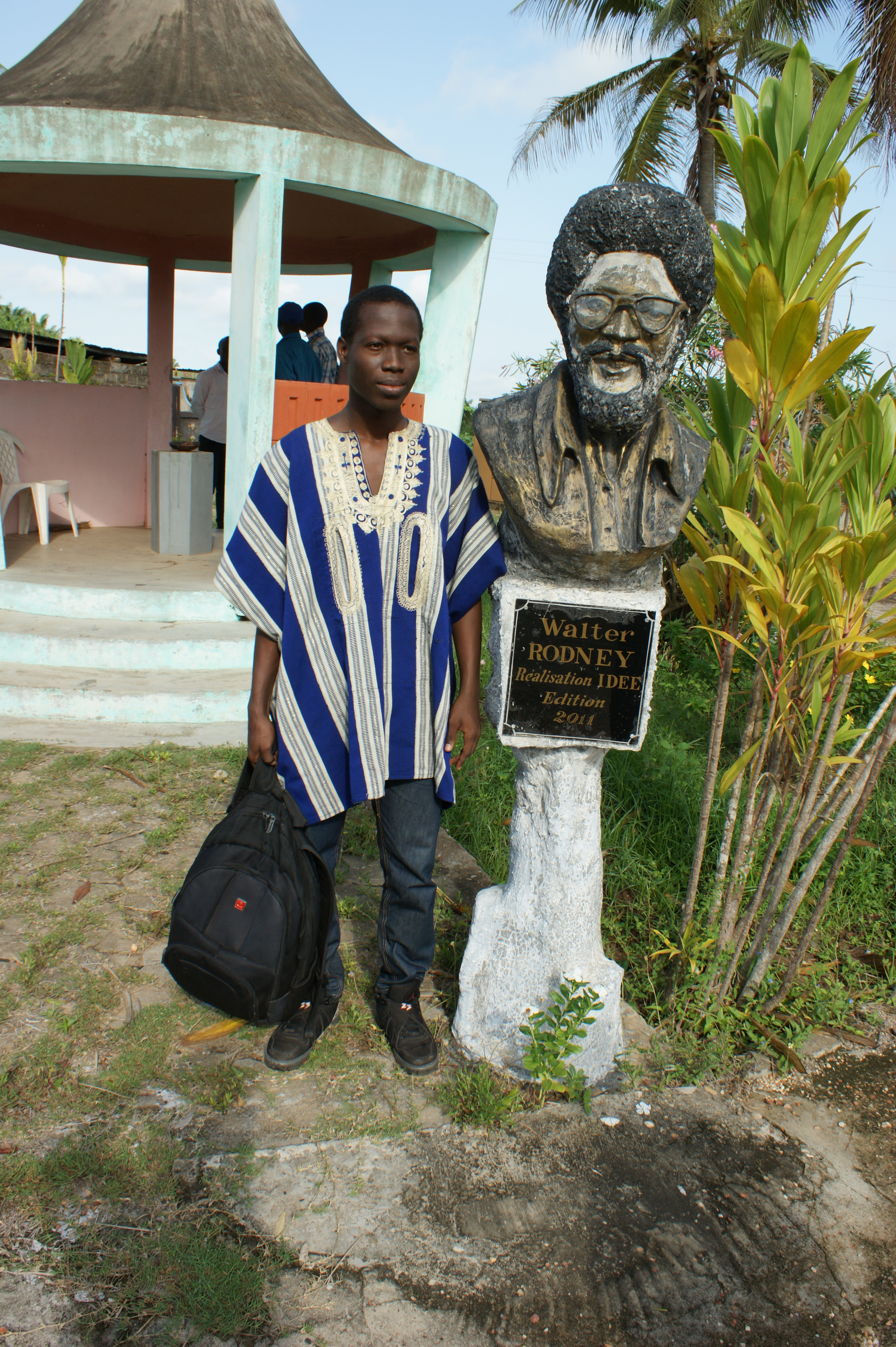
A sculpture of Rodney in Benin

Rodney's death was commemorated in a poem by Martin Carter entitled "For Walter Rodney", by the dub poet Linton Kwesi Johnson in "Reggae fi Radni", and by Kamau Brathwaite in his poem "Poem for Walter Rodney" (Elegguas, 2010). David Dabydeen also wrote a poem on Rodney in his 1988 collection Coolie Odyssey.

In 1977, the African Studies Centre at Boston University inaugurated the Walter Rodney Lecture Series.

Following Rodney's assassination, the bookshop established in West Ealing by Bogle-L'Ouverture Publications (whose first title in 1969 had been The Groundings with my Brothers) was renamed as the Walter Rodney Bookshop.

In 1982, the American Historical Association posthumously awarded Walter Rodney the Albert J. Beveridge Award for A History of the Guyanese Working People, 1881–1905.

In 1984, the Centre for Caribbean Studies at the University of Warwick established the Walter Rodney Memorial Lecture in recognition of the life and work of one of the most outstanding scholar-activists of the Black Diaspora in the post-World War II era.

In 1993, the Guyanese government posthumously awarded Walter Rodney Guyana's highest honour, the Order of Excellence of Guyana. The Guyanese government also established the Walter Rodney Chair in History at the University of Guyana.

In 1998, the Institute of Caribbean Studies at the University of the West Indies inaugurated the Walter Rodney Lecture Series.

In 2004, Rodney's widow Patricia and his children donated his papers to the Robert L. Woodruff Library of the Atlanta University Center. Since 2004, an annual Walter Rodney Symposium has been held each 23 March (Rodney's birthday) at the Center under the sponsorship of the Library and the Political Science Department of Clark Atlanta University, and under the patronage of the Rodney family.

In 2005, the London Borough of Southwark erected a plaque in the Peckham Library Square in commemoration of Dr. Walter Rodney, the political activist, historian and global freedom fighter.

In 2006, an International Conference on Walter Rodney was held at the Institute of Development Studies at the University of Dar es Salaam.

In 2006, the Walter Rodney Essay Competition was established in the Department of Afro-American and African Studies at the University of Michigan.

In 2006, the Walter Rodney Foundation was established by the Rodney family. It is headquartered in Atlanta and aims to share the works and legacy of Rodney with the world.

In 2010, the Walter Rodney Commemorative Symposium was held at York College.

The Department of African American Studies at Syracuse University has established the Angela Davis/Walter Rodney Award of Academic Achievement.

The Department of Afro-American and African Studies (DAAS) at the University of Michigan established the DuBois-Mandela-Rodney Postdoctoral Fellowship Program.

In 2012, the Walter Rodney Conference celebrating the 40th anniversary of the publication of How Europe Underdeveloped Africa was held at Binghamton University.

In 2022, at the 36th Elsa Goveia Memorial Lecture, 50th Anniversary of Dr. Walter Rodney's Book: "How Europe Underdeveloped Africa" was presented by Horace G. Campbell at the University of the West Indies.

Rodney is the subject of the 2010 documentary film by Clairmont Chung, W.A.R. Stories: Walter Anthony Rodney.

The Walter Rodney Close in the London Borough of Newham has been named in honour of Rodney.

Walter Rodney is listed on the Black Achievers Wall in the International Slavery Museum, Liverpool, UK.

In 2022 and 2023, SAVVY Contemporary, an independent art space in Berlin (Germany), dedicated a research, performance and exhibition project, titled to Walter Rodney, fifty years after the publication of How Europe Underdeveloped Africa.

Father-and-son filmmaking duo Arlen Harris and Daniyal Harris-Vadja directed a 2023 documentary exploring Rodney's life, Walter Rodney: What They Don’t Want You to Know.

== Works ==
- The Groundings with my Brothers (London: Bogle L'Ouverture Publications, 1969)
- West Africa and the Atlantic Slave-Trade (1970)
- A History of the Upper Guinea Coast 1545–1800 (Oxford: Clarendon Press, 1970)
- How Europe Underdeveloped Africa (1972)
- World War II and the Tanzanian Economy (1976)
- Guyanese Sugar Plantations in the Late Nineteenth Century: a Contemporary Description from the "Argosy" (Georgetown, Guyana: Release Publications, 1979)
- Marx in the Liberation of Africa (1981)
- A History of the Guyanese Working People, 1881–1905 (Baltimore, MD: The Johns Hopkins University Press, 1981)
- Walter Rodney Speaks: the Making of an African Intellectual (Trenton, NJ: Africa World Press, 1990)
- Kofi Baadu Out of Africa (Georgetown, Guyana), children's book
- Lakshmi Out of India (Georgetown, Guyana: The Guyana Book Foundation, 2000), children's book
- The Russian Revolution: A View from the Third World (New York: Verso Books, 2018)
- Decolonial Marxism: Essays from the Pan-African Revolution (New York: Verso Books, 2022)
- "African History in the Service of the Black Liberation", lecture presented at the Congress of Black Writers, Montreal, Canada, 12 October 1968.
- "George Jackson: Black Revolutionary", in Maji Maji, (5): 4–6 (1971).
- Street speech given in Guyana
- "African slavery and other forms of social oppression on the Upper Guinea Coast, 1580–1650, Journal of African History, 7(3):431–43.
- Portuguese attempts at monopoly on the Upper Guinea Coast", Journal of African History. 6(3):307–22.
- "The impact of the Atlantic Slave Trade in West Africa", in Roland Oliver (editor), The Middle Age of African History, Oxford: Oxford University Press, 1967.
- "Education and Tanzanian socialism". in Resnick (editor), Tanzania: Revolution by Education, Longmans of Tanzania, Arusha, 1968.
- "European activity and African reaction in Angola", in Terence Ranger (editor), Aspects of Central African History, Northwestern University Press, Evanston, 1968.
- "The role of the university in developing Africa", Public Lecture, Makerere Students Guild, Makerere University, Kampala, October 1970.
- "African labour under capitalism and imperialism", Cheche, University of Dar es Salaam, November 1969, 1:4–12.
- "Ideology of the African revolution: Paper presented at the 2nd seminar of East and Central African Youth," The Nationalist (Dar es Salaam), 11 October 1969.
- "The Colonial Economy", in A. Boahen (editor), African under colonial domination 1880–1935, Heinemann and UNESCO, California, 1985.
- "The political economy of colonial Tanganyika 1890–1930", in M. H. Kaniki, Tanzania Under Colonial Rule, Longman, London,1980.
- "Africa in Europe and the Americas", in Richard Gray (editor), The Cambridge History of Africa, Volume 4:c.1600–c.1790, Cambridge University Press, Cambridge, 1975.
- "The Guinea Coast", in Richard Gray (editor), The Cambridge History of Africa, Volume 4:c.1600–c.1790, Cambridge University Press, Cambridge, 1975.
- "Some implications of the question of disengagement from imperialism", Maji Maji, University of Dar es Salaam, January 1971, 1:3–8.
- "State formation and class formation in Tanzania", Maji Maji, 1973, 11:25–32.
- "Slavery and underdevelopment", in M. Craton (editor), Roots and Branches: Current directions in Slave Studies, New York: Pergamon Press, 1979.
- "Class contradictions in Tanzania", in H. Othman (editor), The State in Tanzania: Who controls it and whose interests does it serve, Dar es Salaam: Dar es Salaam University Press, 1980.
- "A Reconsideration of the Mane Invasions of Sierra Leone", in: Journal of African History, 1967a, 8/2, 219–246.
- "Resistance and accommodation in Ovimbundu/Portuguese relations", History departmental seminar, University of Dar es Salaam (1972b).
- "The year 1895 in southern Mozambique: African resistance to the imposition of European colonial rule", Journal of the Historical Society of Nigeria, 1971, 5 (4): 509–35.
