= Valerie Bloom =

Jamaican poet and novelist

Valerie Bloom MBE
- Born: c. 1956 (age 69–70); Clarendon Parish, Jamaica
- Education: University of Kent at Canterbury
- Occupations: Poet, novelist

Valerie Bloom MBE (born 1956) is a Jamaican-born poet and novelist based in the UK.

== Early life ==
Born in Clarendon Parish, Jamaica, Bloom moved to England in 1979. She attended the University of Kent at Canterbury and earned an honours degree and was later awarded an honorary master's degree. She currently lives in Kent.

== Works ==
Bloom has published several collections, the most recent of which is The River's A Singer. Her first collection was Touch Mi, Tell Mi, published by Bogle-L'Ouverture in 1983, and this was followed by Duppy Jamboree (Cambridge University Press, 1992), Let Me Touch the Sky, The World Is Sweet and Hot like Fire. She has also edited a number of collections, including One River Many Creeks and A Twist in the Tale.

Bloom has written lyrics for world jazz ensemble Grand Union Orchestra, including "Can't Chain Up Me Mind" on their 1989 live show and album, Freedom Calls. The show featuring Bloom's lyrics was broadcast on BBC Radio 3 in January 1990.

Her first novel was Surprising Joy (2003). Her next novel, The Tribe, was published by Macmillan Children's Books in 2007.

She writes poetry both in English and Jamaican Patois (and has been referred to as "a successor to Louise Bennett"). Many of her performances include a "crash course" in patois for audience members unfamiliar with the language. She has performed widely throughout the UK and abroad and has appeared on many radio and TV programmes. In 2005, she made a series of three programmes focusing on Jamaican poetry for BBC Radio 4 entitled Island Voices.

== Awards and honours ==
She was appointed Member of the Order of the British Empire (MBE) in the 2008 New Year Honours.

== Selected bibliography ==
=== Poetry ===
- Touch Mi! Tell Mi! (Bogle-L'Ouverture Publications, 1983; revised edition 1990, ISBN 978-0904521528)

=== For children — poetry and picture books ===
- Duppy Jamboree (Cambridge University Press, 1992, ISBN 978-0521409094)
- Ackee, Breadfruit, Callaloo: An Edible Alphabet, illustrated by Kim Harley (Bogle-L’Ouverture and Macmillan Caribbean, 1999, ISBN 978-0333780671)
- Fruits, illustrated by David Axtell (Macmillan Children's Books, 1997, ISBN 978-0333653128; 2000)
- Let Me Touch the Sky: Selected Poems for Children (Macmillan Children's Books, 2000, ISBN 978-0333780671)
- When Granny (Macmillan Children's Books, 2000)
- The World Is Sweet: Poems (Bloomsbury Children's Books, 2000, ISBN 978-0747547501; paperback ISBN 978-0747551157)
- New Baby, illustrated by David Axtell (Macmillan Children's Books, 2001, ISBN 978-0333766323)
- Hot Like Fire and Other Poems (Bloomsbury Children's Books, 2002, ISBN 978-0747556473; paperback ISBN 978-0747599739)
- Whoop an' Shout: Poems (Macmillan Children's Books, 2003, ISBN 978-0333998113; paperback ISBN 978-0330415804)
- Jaws and Claws and Things With Wings: Poems, illustrated by Matt Robertson (HarperCollins, 2013, ISBN 978-0007465392)
- Mighty Mountains, Swirling Seas, illustrated by Alessandra Cimatoribus (HarperCollins, 2015, ISBN 978-0007591268)

=== Novels ===
- Surprising Joy (Macmillan Children's Books, 2003; paperback ISBN 978-0955971129)
- The Tribe (Macmillan Children's Books, 2007, ISBN 978-1405047821; paperback ISBN 978-0330456425)

=== Anthologies (edited) ===
- On a Camel to the Moon, and Other Poems About Journeys (Belitha Press [now Chrysalis Books], 2001, ISBN 9781841382579)
- One River, Many Creeks: Poems from All Around the World (Macmillan Children's Books, 2003, ISBN 978-0333961148; paperback ISBN 978-0330397681)
- A Twist in the Tale: Surprising Poems Chosen by Valerie Bloom (Macmillan Children's Books, 2005, ISBN 978-0330398992)

=== Guides ===
- On Good Form – Poetry Made Simple (Apples and Snakes, 2005)
