= Bass Culture =

Studio album by Linton Kwesi Johnson
- Released: 9 May 1980 (UK)
- Studio: Gooseberry, London
- Genre: Dub poetry
- Length: 31:28
- Label: Island
- Producer: Linton Kwesi Johnson, Dennis "Blackbeard" Bovell

Linton Kwesi Johnson chronology
Forces of Victory (1979)	Bass Culture (1980)	LKJ in Dub (1980)

"Reggae fi Peach"
"Reggae fi Peach" audio sample

Professional ratings
Review scores
Source	Rating
AllMusic	5/5 stars
Christgau's Record Guide	B+
The Rolling Stone Album Guide	4/5 stars
Spin Alternative Record Guide	7/10

Bass Culture is an album by the Jamaica-born, British-based dub poet Linton Kwesi Johnson, released in 1980 on the Island Records label. It was produced by Linton Kwesi Johnson and Dennis Bovell (credited as Blackbeard). Bovell, Lloyd "Jah Bunny" Donaldson and Webster Johnson were members of Matumbi.

The track "Reggae fi Peach" laments the death of Blair Peach, an activist who was killed in London during a clash with police officers while protesting with the Anti-Nazi League against a British National Front meeting in 1979.

== Track listing ==
All tracks written by Linton Kwesi Johnson

1. "Bass Culture" – 6:04
2. "Street 66" – 3:43
3. "Reggae fi Peach" – 3:09
4. "Di Black Petty Booshwah" – 3:36
5. "Inglan Is a Bitch" – 5:26
6. "Loraine" – 4:08
7. "Reggae Sounds" – 3:09
8. "Two Sides of Silence" – 2:13

== Personnel ==
- Linton Kwesi Johnson – vocals
- Floyd Lawson (tracks: 1, 6), Vivian Weathers (tracks: 2–5, 7–8) – bass
- Lloyd "Jah Bunny" Donaldson (tracks: 1, 3–8), Winston Curniffe (track: 2) – drums, percussion
- John Kpiaye – guitar
- Dennis Bovell, Webster Johnson – keyboards
- Dick Cuthell, Henry "Buttons" Tenyue – flugelhorn, trumpet
- Julio Finn – harmonica
- Clinton Bailey, Everald "Fari" Forrest – percussion
- James Danton – alto saxophone
- Henry "Buttons" Tenyue – tenor saxophone
- Rico – trombone

Technical

- Dennis Bovell – engineer, mixing
- John Caffrey, Mark Angelo Lusardi – engineer
- Dennis Morris – sleeve concept and design
