= Tings an' Times =

Studio album by Linton Kwesi Johnson
- Released: 1991
- Studios: Sparkside, Dulwich Road, London
- Genres: Reggae, dub, spoken word
- Label: Shanachie
- Producers: Linton Kwesi Johnson, Dennis Bovell

Linton Kwesi Johnson chronology
In Concert with the Dub Band (1985)	Tings an' Times (1991)	LKJ in Dub: Volume 2 (1992)

Tings an' Times is an album by the Jamaican dub poet Linton Kwesi Johnson, released in 1991. It was Johnson's first album in six years. Tings an' Times also served as the title of a book of Johnson's poetry.

== Production ==
The album was produced by Johnson and Dennis Bovell. Johnson was again backed by the Dub Band, with the sound fleshed out by the addition of accordion and violin. Steve Gregory contributed on flute and saxophone.

== Critical reception ==
Professional ratings
Review scores
Source	Rating
AllMusic	3/5 stars
Robert Christgau	A
The Encyclopedia of Popular Music	4/5 stars
Los Angeles Times	2.5/4 stars
Orlando Sentinel	5/5 stars
The Rolling Stone Album Guide	4/5 stars
Spin Alternative Record Guide	8/10

Robert Christgau wrote that "the riddims skip by on Dennis Bovell's ska-speedy tempos, graced with tricky guitar hooks and colored with fiddle and accordion that sing Hungary and Algeria and Colombia and the Rio Grande." The Los Angeles Times lamented that "Johnson’s delivery is both tentative and buried a bit in the mix, lessening the impact." The Orlando Sentinel opined that "Johnson's thoughtful lyrics float over gorgeous elongated reggae tracks flavored with jazz-influenced horns, accordion, piano, violin and flute." The Commercial Appeal noted that Johnson's "spry quips and brusque cadences [ride] over tough rhythms."

AllMusic thought that Johnson's "outlook is intensely African, and his socio-political lyrics (some in English, some in an African language) are a passionate call for democracy in Africa." The Spin Alternative Record Guide praised the "increased doses of joy and irony in LKJ's meditations." Trouser Press deemed Tings an' Times "an upbeat but stringently critical album that is at once traditional and modern."

== Track listing ==
All tracks are written by Linton Kwesi Johnson.

No.	Title	Length
1.	"Story"	5:20
2.	"Sense Outta Nansense"	4:59
3.	"Tings an' Times"	6:32
4.	"Mi Revalueshanary Fren"	5:19
5.	"Di Good Life"	5:30
6.	"Di Anfinished Revalueshan"	5:33
7.	"Dubbing for Life"	4:03

== Personnel ==
- Linton Kwesi Johnson – vocals, percussion, production

The Dub Band

- John Kpiaye – guitar
- Dennis Bovell – bass, percussion, production, engineer, mixing
- Nick Straker – keyboards
- Paget King – organ, piano, synthesizer
- Henry Holder – piano
- Paul Blake – drums
- Everald Forrest, Jeff Scantlebury – percussion
- Steve Gregory – tenor saxophone, flute
- Paul Spong – trumpet
- Fayyaz Virji, Henry Tenyue – trombone
- Ian Hill – accordion
- Johnny "T" Taylor – violin

Technical

- Antonio Vignocchi – cover painting
