= Brain Damage (album) =

Studio album by Dennis Bovell
- Released: 1981
- Studio: Studio 80, London
- Genre: Reggae; dub
- Length: 51:39
- Label: Fontana
- Producer: Dennis Bovell

Dennis Bovell chronology
I Wah Dub (1980)	Brain Damage (1981)	Audio Active (1986)

Brain Damage is the third studio album by Barbadian-British reggae musician Dennis Bovell, released in 1981 by Fontana Records. His first solo album under his own name, following two dub albums released as Blackbeard, it was Bovell's first recording at his South London-based Studio 80. Having begun to feel that reggae had not progressed as much as he would have liked, he conceived Brain Damage as an attempt to fuse the genre with numerous rhythmic styles from Europe, America, Africa and the Caribbean to highlight the genre's flexibility. The musician intended not to explore the international rhythms in a standard way but to take them to what he perceived as musical extremes. The direction was also inspired by the wide array of people in his audience.

The album fuses reggae with styles such as rock, R&B, calypso, soca, disco, boogie-woogie and jazz, with Bovell providing mixing, production and most of the instrumentation. A second disc of instrumental dub tracks also features as a freebie, reducing the album's original price to that of a single album. Bovell formed the Dub Band to promote the album in concert, having envisioned its material in a live context. Music critics praised the album's eclecticism and musical abilities. In 2006, the album was remastered and issued as a single CD by Front Line.

== Background and recording ==
By the late 1970s, guitarist Dennis Bovell had become one of the major figures on the London reggae scene, most prominently with the band Matumbi, who he had co-founded in the middle of the decade. However, he found himself hampered by straightforward reggae, and undertook a varied set of projects like the solo dub albums Strictly Dub Wize (1978) and I Wah Dub (1980), both released under the name Blackbeard, production for experimental post-punk bands the Slits and the Pop Group, and helping bring about lovers rock via his work with singers like Janet Kay. According to biographer Lloyd Bradley, Bovell had started to feel through his live work with reggae artists that the genre had not been taken far enough and wished to push it "as far as possible", feeling that reggae was "strong enough to hold its own when applied to just about anything. To use it like jazz and take over tunes done in different styles and create a set of hybrids."

"It was because we used to get all sorts of people at our shows, that I knew there was scope to try things out. We'd get punks or students, so I did a rock'n'roll version of 'After Tonight', then there was the Nigerian crowd, who went for the Afro soul beat of tunes like 'Aqua Dub', or there were a lot of calypso fans so I put 'Bertie' on there for them – I played drums on that track."

—Dennis Bovell on his audience's influence

Feeling that his playing had become too self-styled, Bovell wanted "to be flexible, so that we can jump into a reggae number and then a jazz tune and then pop and then blues", and conceived Brain Damage in this fashion, intending the album to bring audiences of the disparate genres together. He explained, "there's people of different mentalities listening to the different musics. And that should not be! I wanna mash that barrier and have everyone listening to everything. Because then everyone's going to start appreciating everyone else for being in the world!" The musician wished to prove reggae's versatility by fusing the genre with rhythms from the Caribbean, Africa and Europe. His inspiration for wanting to explore world rhythms beyond the Caribbean came from listening to funk and afrobeat artists of the era like the Funkees, Prince Nico and Savannah 75. Further influencing the album was "all sorts of people" appearing at his shows ensuring him that "there was scope to try things out", which he reflected by re-recording Matumbi's "After Tonight" in a rock style for his punk and student fans, appeasing his Nigerian followers with the Afro-soul-styled "Aqua Dub" and wanting to give his original reggae fans "something extra by putting a bit of a twist on them" with more straightforward reggae tracks "Ehying" and "Bettah".

Brain Damage was the first recording by Bovell at Studio 80, his South London studio which he had equipped with a 24-track recorder, and wished to show his technical musical abilities as much as he wanted to show reggae's flexibility. In addition to writing the material and singing, he played the majority of the album's instruments, including guitar, bass, drums, viola and keyboards, and produced and mixed the record. Further contributors throughout the album include guitarist John Kpiaye, trumpeter Eddie Thornton, trombonist Rico Rodriguez and saxophonists Laura Logic and Steve Gregory. The musician chose not to explore international rhythms in a standard away, instead wishing to "take the various styles as far as I could, as far as they could go, and, as I suppose I figured it in my own way, free them." He credited this mentality as having originated when experimenting with dub and reggae in a myriad of areas with John Kpiaye and Aswad's Tony Gad and Drummie Zeb when working on projects like the soundtrack to the film Babylon (1980).

== Composition ==
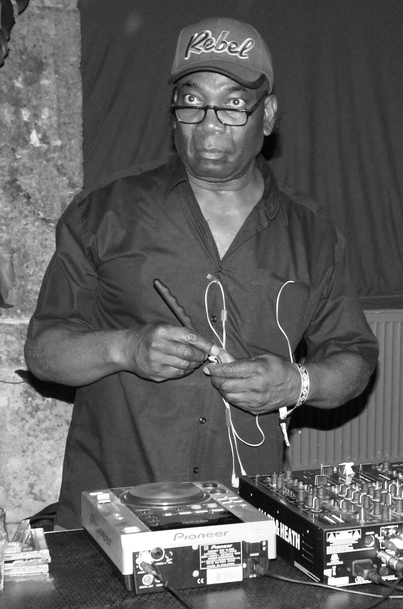
Dennis Bovell (pictured 2005) conceived Brain Damage as a way of fusing reggae with a myriad of other genres.

Brain Damage contains eight songs and eight dubs which explore a wide array of popular music forms and influences, while keeping reggae at its core. The album fuses reggae subgenres such as roots reggae, lovers rock, and dub with other genres including pop, rock and roll, rhythm and blues, disco, funk, calypso, soca, Latin music, boogie-woogie, jazz and afrobeat, with each song being stylistically unique. Bovell hoped that, via its genre excursions, the album would "fry a few crania", and the record highlights his "cut 'n' mix" mentality above any interest in adhering to 'roots', according to author Dick Hebdige, who considers Brain Damage to exemplify "mutant reggae", a style he describes as "reggae which has been knocked into a different shape by banging up against calypso, R&B, rock 'n' roll', disco etc.". The album also features what writer Mark Ellen called "a sprinkling of obscure musical jokes", such as "corny theme tunes".

Originally issued as a double album, the first disc contains the songs and features the most instrumental input from Bovell, while the second disc is dedicated to dub instrumentals and was advertised as a "free album". The ominous "Bettah" is more typical of Bovell's work, with its strident reggae rhythm and "inner-city" protest lyrics. A re-recording of a Matumbi song, the rock and roll-styled "After Tonight" features New Orleans R&B-style saxophone work. Bovell explained that he placed the song "right in the middle of the reggae music on the first side" as an attempt to "shake it up. 'Cos people are too set in their ways; a lot of black people will stick their nose up at hearing a rock'n'roll tune, and equally on the other side. So that's got to go." The lovers rock-styled "Our Tune" is a "lyrical pop ballad." "Run Away" has drawn comparisons to 1950 black American vocal groups and the rhythm and blues ska of the Skatalites. "Heaven" is shimmering disco-funk song which Bovell wrote to fuse different black music, explaining: "it one minute has an African rhythm, and then it moves to an American tune, and it keeps going in between the two." According to Bradley, "Smouche" and "El Passoah" are "straight up soul", while "Chief Inspector" explores jazz.

== Release and promotion ==
Bovell named the album Brain Damage in reference to how he had created music he hoped would "do people's heads in when they heard what could be done and still be called reggae." Issued at a two-for-the-price-of-one scheme due to the bonus dub disc, the album was released in 1981 by Fontana Records, at the time a Phonogram company. It was Bovell's first album to be released under his own name, and the sleeve – photographed by Simon Fowler – depicts him as a bearded, dreadlocked teacher. It did not chart in the United Kingdom, as with the musician's other albums. In the United States, the album was available in shops dedicated to new wave imports, such as Bonaparte in New York City.

To play the album's material live, Bovell formed the Dub Band. Regardless of the album's stylistic endeavours, Bovell had intended the album to be a set of tunes which would work best in a live context. In an interview with Chris Salewicz of the NME, Bovell explained he wished to move away from the "demeaning routine of headline act and support act" and wished two have a "two equal bands set up" where "each band would play one tune each after another, the same as in sound system competitions." According to Bradley, since the material "was far more about the tunes and the instrumentation than the studio effects or the technology," the album's accompanying tour was able to take advantage of making audiences wonder which styles Bovell and his band would tackle with each track. For a long period following the tour, Bovell took a break from performances and did not reappear live until March 1983.

== Critical reception and legacy ==
Professional ratings
Review scores
Source	Rating
AllMusic	3/5 stars
The New Rolling Stone Album Guide	3/5 stars
Smash Hits	9/10
Sounds	4/5 stars

In a contemporary review, Mark Ellen of Smash Hits felt that the "brilliant" Brain Damage built on the promise of I Wah Dub by revealing "yet more echoing corridors" down which Bovell explores a wide array of genres which are each presented "in the way you'd least expect", with the free dub disc increasing the entertainment factor. Peter Trollope of the Liverpool Echo praised the first disc as an assortment of songs which "define reggae today–a contemporary culture that is breaking new boundaries, developing new scope–thanks to people like Bovell", while describing the dub disc as a pleasurable addition. Reviewing the record for Harrow Midweek, Mike Hrano wrote that Bovell "copes triumphantly with any music he chooses to dabble in", highlighting how the genre explorations cover "the whole gambit", and commented how the album still revealed new "treasures and secrets" on repeated listens. Less favourable was Brian Altken of the Aberdeen Evening Express, who said that while Bovell is a good session musician for other artists, the album "suggests that this is where he should stay", with the dub disc making "the tedium last longer".

In an article for The New York Times, Robert Palmer commented how Brain Damage "suggests that Britain's emerging black pop can encompass as many idioms as the most eclectic white rock, but from an explicitly black musical perspective," further naming it as "one of the year's most savory and unexpected recorded pleasures" and positioning it with Linx's Intuition (1981) as black pop albums with a distinct British character. A 1982 article in Race Today praised the album's genre fusions, musical knowledge and Bovell's diverse skills, calling it "the most daring and eclectic album ever produced by a reggae artist." In a mixed retrospective assessment for The New Rolling Stone Album Guide, Randall Grass wrote that the album "moves easily from one musical style to another to produce many inspiring moments limited by uneven material." Jim Green of Trouser Press noted how the "consistently enjoyable" album unusually features little dub and was "[g]ood lightweight groove music, ideal for summer," finding the bonus dub disc to be "similar to I Wah Dub, though not as engrossing." Authors Phil Hardy and Dave Laing consider the album to be the "masterpiece" among Bovell's solo albums. In 2006, Brain Damage was remastered and released as a single CD by Front Line, while "Heaven" and "Smouche" were released as a twelve-inch single on 23 September 2014 by Optimo Records as part of their "Optimo Disc Plate Series", label co-founder JD Twitch having described Brain Damage as a "forgotten masterpiece."

== Track listing ==
All tracks composed and arranged by Dennis Bovell

=== Side one ===
1. "Brain Damage" – 2:14
2. "Bettah" – 3:14
3. "After Tonight" – 3:00
4. "Our Tune" – 3:22
5. "Run Away" – 2:07

=== Side two ===
6. "Heaven" – 5:48
7. "Bah Le Bon" – 3:06
8. "Bertie" – 3:25

=== Side three ===
1. "Aqua Dub" – 2:08
2. "Frea Stoil" – 3:13
3. "Smouche" – 3:04
4. "El Passoah" – 3:47

=== Side four ===
5. "Chief Inspector" – 2:35
6. "Ehying" – 4:24
7. "Dutty" – 2:48
8. "Cabbage" – 3:23

== Personnel ==
Adapted from the liner notes of Brain Damage

Musicians

- Dennis Bovell - vocals, guitar, bass, piano, drums, synthesiser, organ, writing, production, arrangement, mixing
- Angus Gaye – drums (tracks 1, 5, 7, 9–16)
- John Kpiaye – guitar (tracks 6, 9–16)
- Henry Tenyue – trumpet, saxophone
- Patrick Tenyue – flugelhorn
- Tony Robinson – piano (tracks 1, 7, 9–16)
- Laura Logic – saxophone (track 2)
- Mac Poole – drums (track 3)
- Frank Marshall – piano (track 3)
- Steve Gregory – saxophone (track 3)
- Phil Towner – congas (track 6)
- Seyoum Netfa – congas (track 6)
- Errol Melbourne – drums (track 6, 11)
- Webster Johnson – talking drum (track 6)
- Eddie Thornton – trumpet (track 6)
- Marie Pierre – backing vocals (track 8)
- Brinsley "Dan" Forde – guitar (track 10)
- Rico Rodriguez – trombone (track 10)
- Julio Finn – harmonica (track 15)

"…35HZ bass line ah bubble …2.5 mid frequency 16K ah treble, rockin in ah reggae frenzy …brain damage!"

Additional

- Bill Farley – engineer
- Dave Hunt – engineer
- Seyoum Netfa – engineer
- Simon Fowler – photography
- Terry Jones – design concept
