= Making History (album) =

- Cover photography by Peter Ashworth

Studio album by Linton Kwesi Johnson
- Released: 1984
- Studios: Studio 80, 6-8 Emerson Street, Waterloo, London
- Genre: Reggae
- Length: 33:31
- Label: Island
- Producer: Dennis Bovell

Linton Kwesi Johnson chronology
LKJ in Dub (1980)	Making History (1984)	LKJ Live in Concert with the Dub Band (1985)

Making History is an album by the Jamaica-born, British-based dub poet Linton Kwesi Johnson. It was released in 1984 on Island Records. It was produced by Dennis Bovell.

== Critical reception ==
Professional ratings
Review scores
Source	Rating
AllMusic	4.5/5 stars
The Encyclopedia of Popular Music	4/5 stars
The Rolling Stone Album Guide	4/5 stars
Sounds	5/5 stars
Spin Alternative Record Guide	8/10
The Village Voice	A

Trouser Press called the album "as vital as any [Johnson and Bovell] had made together." The New York Times wrote: "Dennis Bovell ... has fashioned settings for the poems on Making History that draw their melodies directly from the inflections and intonation of the lines. Most selections sport catchy instrumental melodies that weave in and out of the poetry, making it sound much like song."

NME ranked it number 16 among the "Albums of the Year" for 1984.

== Track listing ==
All tracks written by Linton Kwesi Johnson

1. "Di Eagle an' di Bear" – 4:14
2. "Wat About di Working Claas?" – 5:12
3. "Di Great Insohreckshan" – 4:02
4. "Making History" – 4:19
5. "Reggae fi Radni" – 4:24
6. "Reggae fi Dada" – 4:50
7. "New Craas Massahkah" – 6:30

== Personnel ==
- Linton Kwesi Johnson - voice

The Dub Band

- Dennis Bovell – bass, mixing
- Richie Stevens – drums
- John Kpiaye – guitar
- Paget King – keyboards
- Nick Straker – synthesizer
- Patrick Tenyue – trumpet
- Henry "Buttons" Tenyue – trombone
- Geoffrey Scantlebury – percussion
- Tony Utah – other percussion
- Everald Forrest – other percussion

Technical

- Dennis Bovell, Godwin Logie, Martin Rex, Stephen Street – engineers
- Bruno Tilley – artwork
- Peter Ashworth – photography

== Charts ==
Album

Year	Country	Chart	Peak position	Citation
1984	UK	UK Official Album Chart	73	
