= LKJ in Dub =

Studio album by Linton Kwesi Johnson
- Released: 1980 (UK)
- Genre: Dub reggae
- Length: 30:01
- Label: Island
- Producer: Dennis Bovell

Linton Kwesi Johnson chronology
Bass Culture (1980)	LKJ in Dub (1980)	Making History (1983)

"Iron Bar Dub.ogg"
Iron Bar Dub audio sample

LKJ in Dub is an album by the Jamaica-born, British-based dub poet Linton Kwesi Johnson, released in 1980 on Island Records. It was produced by Dennis Bovell (credited as Blackbeard). It contains dub versions of tracks from the two previous LKJ albums, Forces of Victory and Bass Culture.

== Critical reception ==
Professional ratings
Review scores
Source	Rating
AllMusic	3.5/5 stars
The Encyclopedia of Popular Music	3/5 stars
The Rolling Stone Album Guide	3.5/5 stars
Spin Alternative Record Guide	5/10

Trouser Press called the album "an interesting and successful example of dub technique." The New York Times compared the album to Bovell's recent I Wah Dub, calling LKJ in Dub "a less gimmicky, more emotionally satisfying piece of work." The Boston Globe wrote that "there are some nice grooves here, but with no voice to sing, no soloing instruments, not even a stray Frippertronic to hang onto, it's hard to recommend this album."

== Track listing ==
All tracks written by Linton Kwesi Johnson

1. "Victorious Dub" – 3:32
2. "Reality [dub]" – 2:45
3. "Peach Dub" – 3:48
4. "Shocking [dub]" – 4:45
5. "Iron Bar Dub" – 3:42
6. "Bitch Dub" – 4:35
7. "Cultural Dub" – 3:27
8. "Brain Smashing Dub" – 3:27

== Personnel ==
- Floyd Lawson, Vivian Weathers - bass guitar
- Winston Curniffe - drums
- Lloyd "Jah Bunny" Donaldson - drums, percussion
- John Kpiaye - guitar
- Julio Finn - harmonica
- Dennis Bovell, Webster Johnson - keyboards
- Clinton Bailey, Everard Forrest - percussion
- James Danton - alto saxophone
- Rico - trombone
- Dick Cuthell, Henry "Buttons" Tenyue - trumpet, flugelhorn

Technical

- Dennis Bovell - mixing
- Dennis Morris - cover design
