= Gooseberry Sound Studios =

Former recording studio in London

Coordinates: 51°30′42″N 0°07′54″W

Gooseberry Sound Studios, also known as just Gooseberry Studios, were recording studios at 19 Gerrard Street, Chinatown, London, located in a cellar underneath a dental practice.

The studio was owned by Peter Houghton and was known in its early days for its particularly cheap rates. This affordability made it popular with reggae artists and punk bands wanting to make cheap demos.

== History ==
It originally opened in around 1968 as 'Studio 19' as a 4-track demo recording studio, before becoming an 8-track demo recording studio in mid-1972. By 1976, the studio had moved to 16-track and then moved to 24-track in 1980.

One of the first successful recordings at Gooseberry was in 1974 by 15-year old Louisa Mark with a cover version of "Caught You in a Lie" by Robert Parker. The song, seen as the first lovers rock single, was a hit with reggae audiences and sold 10,000 copies in the first week of its release in June 1975.

Between 17 and 28 January 1977, punk band Sex Pistols recorded some demos at the studio which were the last recordings together by the original members of the band. These demos include "Pretty Vacant", "God Save the Queen" and "E.M.I." One of the most well-known albums recorded at Gooseberry was Replicas by Tubeway Army, with their hit single "Are "Friends" Electric?". The album was recorded between December 1978 and January 1979. Robert Plant in the 2025 documentary "Becoming Led Zeppelin", revealed that Gooseberry was the location of the band's first ever rehearsal where they played "Train Kept A-Rollin" among other songs over a 2-hour session, however, they did not record there.

The studios closed in around the mid-1990s.

== Notable recordings ==
Note: dates indicate when the recordings were released.

=== Albums ===
==== 1970s ====
- Spunk – Sex Pistols (tracks 7–12) (1977)
- Tradition in Dub – Tradition (1977)
- Clash – Dillinger verses Trinity (mixing only) (1977)
- Harvest Uptown, Famine Downtown – Soul Syndicate (not all tracks recorded at Gooseberry) (1977)
- Dread Beat an' Blood – Poet and the Roots (1978)
- Strictly Dub Wize – Blackbeard (1978)
- Moving On – Tradition (1978)
- Win Some Lose Some – Junior English (1978)
- Truth – The Blues Busters (1978)
- On the Other Hand There's a Fist – Jona Lewie (1978)
- Country Boy – Harry Mosco (1978)
- Public Image: First Issue – Public Image Ltd (tracks 6–8) (1978)
- Replicas – Tubeway Army (1979)
- In Person – Samantha Rose (1979)
- Peace & Harmony – Harry Mosco (1979)
- Metal Box – Public Image Ltd (only "The Suit") (1979)

==== 1980s ====
- Black Slate – Black Slate (1980)
- Bass Culture – Linton Kwesi Johnson (1980)
- Amigo – Black Slate (1980)
- 1980 Art. 1 Die Würde Des Menschen Ist Unantastbar – Big Balls and the Great White Idiot (1980)
- I Wah Dub – Blackbeard (1980)
- Whap'n Bap'n – I-Roy (as Roy Reid) (1980)
- Rasta Festival – Black Slate (1980)
- Tribute to Sam Cooke – The Blues Busters (1980)
- Ogima – Black Slate (1981)
- Six Plus One – Black Slate (1982)
- Full Circle – Holger Czukay, Jah Wobble and Jaki Liebezeit (only "How Much Are They?") (1982)
- 35 Years From Alpha – Deadly Headley (1982)
- Satisfaction Feeling – Dennis Brown (only remixing) (1983)
- 42°F – Rubella Ballet (1984)
- Songs of Praise – Poison Girls (1985)
- The King and I – Eek-A-Mouse (not all tracks recorded at Gooseberry) (1985)
- Going, Gone – Richard Strange and the Engine Room (only "Banco Celestial") (1986)
- Dawnrazor – Fields Of The Nephilim (only "Blue Water" mixed at Gooseberry) (1987)
- Young and Crazy – Tigertailz (1987)
- Tarka – Anthony Phillips & Harry Williamson (not all tracks) (1988)
- Ghana Mba – C.K. Mann (mixing only) (1988)
- Through the Veil – Claytown Troupe (some mixing only) (1989)

==== 1990s ====
- The $hit Factory – Peter and the Test Tube Babies (mixing only) (1990)
- Freedom and Rain – June Tabor and Oyster band (mixing only) (1990)
- Hanging Gardens – Nico (1990)
- The First of Too Many – Senseless Things (1991)
- Lazer Guided Melodies – Spiritualized (some mixing only) (1992)
- Whirlpool – Chapterhouse (only "Pearl") (1991)
- Nurse – Therapy? (mixing only) (1992)
- Deserters – Oysterband (mixing only) (1992)
- Angel Tiger – June Tabor (mixing only) (1992)
- The Return of Honk! – Joe Houston and Otis Grand (mixing only) (1994)

=== Non-album singles and EPs ===
==== 1970s ====
- "Caught You in a Lie" – Louisa Mark (1975)
- "I Am a Levi" – Ijahman Levi (1976)
- "Zimbabwe" – Dambala (1978)
- "Rebel" – Dambala (1978)
- FBI, Wish You Could See Me Now - Shakedown (1978)
- Steel Leg V The Electric Dread – Don Letts, Keith Levene, Steel Leg and Jah Wobble (EP) (1978)
- "Ambition" – Subway Sect (1978)
- Turn to Red – Killing Joke (EP; re-released as Almost Red) (1979)

==== 1980s ====
- V.I.E.P. Featuring Blueberry Hill – Jah Wobble (EP) (1980)
- "Wardance" – Killing Joke (1980)
- Long Live the Past E.P. – The Pack (1982)
- "The Title Track From 'The Whip'" – Carcrash International (1983)
- "Terry" – Cindy & The Saffrons (1983)
- 1978–79 Volume 2 – Gary Numan and Tubeway Army (EP) (1985)
- "Hot Doggie" – Colourbox (features on 1987 compilation album Lonely Is an Eyesore)
- Dirt Demo '86 – Satan (demo) (1986)
- Into the Future – Satan (EP) (1986)
- "There She Goes Again" – The Quireboys (1988)

==== 1990s ====
- "Mesmerise" – Chapterhouse (1991)
