= Forces of Victory =

Studio album by Linton Kwesi Johnson
- Released: 1979 (UK)
- Recorded: 1978
- Genres: Dub reggae; dub poetry
- Length: 32:47
- Label: Island
- Producers: Linton Kwesi Johnson; Dennis Bovell

Linton Kwesi Johnson chronology
Dread Beat an' Blood (1978)	Forces of Victory (1979)	Bass Culture (1980)

Forces of Victory is the debut solo album by the Jamaican dub poet Linton Kwesi Johnson. It was released in 1979 on Island Records.

The album peaked at No. 66 on the UK Albums Chart.

== Production ==
The album was produced by Linton Kwesi Johnson and Dennis "Blackbeard" Bovell. Bovell, Lloyd "Jah Bunny" Donaldson and Webster Johnson were members of Matumbi.

== Critical reception ==
Professional ratings
Review scores
Source	Rating
AllMusic	4.5/5 stars
Christgau's Record Guide	A−
The Encyclopedia of Popular Music	4/5 stars
Record Mirror	5/5 stars
The Rolling Stone Album Guide	5/5 stars
Spin Alternative Record Guide	9/10

AllMusic wrote: "Dramatic and intense to the point of claustrophobia, Forces of Victory is not simply one of the most important reggae records of its time, it's one of the most important reggae records ever recorded." Trouser Press wrote that "Johnson’s voice gains greater range and expressiveness while his poetry speaks of dire truths, and sounds increasingly complex, compact and expert."

== Track listing ==
All tracks by Linton Kwesi Johnson

1. "Want fi Goh Rave" – 4:20
2. "It Noh Funny" – 3:42
3. "Sonny's Lettah (Anti-Sus Poem)" – 3:50
4. "Independent Intavenshan" – 4:20
5. "Fite Dem Back" – 4:27
6. "Reality Poem" – 4:44
7. "Forces of Viktry" – 4:56
8. "Time Come" – 3:28

== Personnel ==
- Linton Kwesi Johnson - vocals
- Floyd Lawson (tracks: 1, 5), Vivian Weathers (tracks: 2–4, 6–7) - bass
- Lloyd "Jah Bunny" Donaldson (tracks: 1–4, 7), Winston "Crab" Curniffe (tracks: 5–6, 8) - drums, percussion
- John Kpiaye - lead and rhythm guitar
- Julio Finn - harmonica
- Rico - trombone
- Dick Cuthell - flugelhorn
- Dennis Bovell (as "The Invisible One"), Webster Johnson - keyboards, piano
- Everald "Fari" Forrest - percussion
- Dennis Bovell, Vivian Weathers, Winston Bennett - additional voices

Technical

- Dennis "Blackbeard" Bovell, John Caffrey - engineer
- Dennis Morris - photography
- Zebulon Design - design
