= Sufferer Sounds =

Compilation album by Dennis Bovell
- Released: 15 November 2024
- Genres: Reggae, dub reggae
- Length: 66:30
- Label: Disciples

Dennis Bovell chronology
The Dubmaster (2022)	Sufferer Sounds (2024)

Sufferer Sounds is a compilation album by Barbadian-British reggae musician and producer Dennis Bovell, compiling tracks that he released between 1976 and 1980 with different groups and under various pseudonyms. It was released on 15 November 2024 on Disciples, an imprint of Warp Records.

== Background and release ==
Dennis Bovell was born in Saint Peter, Barbados, in 1953, and moved to London in 1965. In the 1970s Bovell ran the Jah Sufferer sound system, fronted his band Matumbi, released solo work under various names, and produced albums for Linton Kwesi Johnson.

In 2018 Bovell played a DJ set at the General Echo Reggae Disco, a regular event at the Walthamstow Trades Hall run by Matthew Jones, the head of a Warp Records imprint called Disciples. Jones and Bovell agreed to release a compilation of Bovell's obscure singles and dubs, but their plans were delayed by the COVID-19 pandemic. According to The Wire, "once finally under way, finding useable versions entailed a lot of clean up work."

== Critical reception ==
Professional ratings
Review scores
Source	Rating
AllMusic	4/5 stars
Mojo	4/5 stars
Uncut	9/10

Simon McEwen of Mojo wrote that "there have been other decent [Dennis Bovell] retrospectives... but none that so comprehensively capture the essence of Bovell's heavy-but-melodious signature sound." In a review for Uncut, Louis Pattinson wrote that "the quality of music collected on Sufferer Sounds makes it hard to deny: in the field of UK reggae, Dennis Bovell was one of the greatest to ever do it."

The Quietus described "Game of Dubs", a dub version of "Silly Games", as "a standout amongst standouts." Uncut called the track "very much an alternate take, but one that shows Bovell at the peak of his powers."

== Track listing ==
All tracks are written by Dennis Bovell, except where noted.

No.	Title	Writer(s)	Artist (Original release year, label)	Length
1.	"Dub Land"		The Dub Band (1978, More Cut)	6:55
2.	"Blood Dem"		Dennis Matumbi (1977, Rama)	3:53
3.	"Suffrah Dub (Sufferer Sound Disco 45)"		Dennis Bovell Dub Band (1978, Tempus)	6:04
4.	"Positive Vibrations"		Pebbles (1977, Arawak)	3:45
5.	"Compelled"		Cosmic Idren (1977, Arawak)	3:37
6.	"Come With Me"	Bovell/Straker	Dennis Curtis (1976, K&B)	3:28
7.	"Dub Planet"		Matumbi (1980, Extinguish Records)	4:14
8.	"Run Rasta Run"		African Stone (1976, More Cut)	2:54
9.	"Fire Dub"		Matumbi (1977, Micron)	5:39
10.	"Jah Man"	Bovell/Campbell	Errol Campbell (1977, Tempus)	3:54
11.	"Take Dub"	Paul Desmond	Young Lions (1978, Discovery)	5:00
12.	"Game of Dubs"		Dennis Bovell & Janet Kay (1995, Arawak)	4:54
13.	"Dub Choice"		African Stone (1978, Tempus)	3:40
14.	"Cry"		Angelique (1977, Tempus)	4:07
15.	"Crying"		DB at the Controls (1977, Tempus)	4:26
Total length:				66:30

== Personnel ==
- Syd Shelton – photography
- Kassian Troyer – mastering
- Sean P. – audio transfers
