= Louisa Mark =

- Album cover artwork for Breakout

Background information
- Born: Louisa Lynthia Mark; 11 January 1960; Kensal Green, London, England
- Died: 17 October 2009 (aged 49) Gambia
- Genre: Lovers rock
- Instrument: Vocals
- Years active: 1975–2009
- Label: Bushays

Louisa Lynthia Mark, also known as "Markswoman" (11 January 1960 – 17 October 2009), was a British lovers rock singer, best known for her work between the mid-1970s and early 1980s. Her 1975 single "Caught You in a Lie" is regarded as the first lovers rock single.

== Biography ==
Mark was born in Kensal Rise, London to Grenadian immigrant parents, and grew up in Shepherd's Bush. She had her introduction to the music business in 1973, initially by working as guest vocalist on Dennis Bovell's Sufferer sound system during its residency at the Metro club in Westbourne Park.

In 1974 Mark entered the "Star Search" talent contests held at the Four Aces club in Dalston, where she won for ten consecutive weeks. Sound-system operator and record producer Lloyd Coxsone supplied dubplates for the contestants to sing over at the contests and, in late 1974, provided the fifteen-year-old Mark with her first recording session, at Gooseberry Studios, where she recorded a cover version of Robert Parker's "Caught You in a Lie", on which she was backed by Matumbi. The song was pressed as a single on Coxsone's Safari label in the UK and was also released in Jamaica by Gussie Clarke.

"Caught You in a Lie" sold 10,000 copies in the first week it was released and reached number on in the UK reggae charts in August 1975. It is considered the first lovers rock single. The follow up single was a cover version of The Beatles' "All My Loving". Marks' musical career was then interrupted after a dispute with Coxsone and she concentrated on finishing her studies.

After leaving school, Mark resumed work as a vocalist, this time with Trojan Records house producer and A&R manager Clement Bushay, and songwriter/arranger Joseph "Tunga" Charles (of Zabandis), releasing "Keep it Like It Is" in 1977. She stayed with Bushay for further releases on his own Bushays label including her rendition of Michael Jackson's "Even Though You're Gone" and "Six Sixth Street", which also reached number one in the reggae charts.

Her only album Breakout was released in 1981. She was unhappy with the album, feeling that it had been released before it had been properly finished, and did not record again for over a year. Mark returned to the studio in 1982, recording "Mum and Dad" (arranged by Sly & Robbie).

Mark was voted Artist of The Year in the 1978 Reggae Awards (UK).

== Death ==
On the 18 October 2009 edition of his BBC London radio show, Dotun Adebayo reported that Mark had died of poisoning in Gambia, where she had been residing.

On 20 October 2009, Trojan Records confirmed the story, stating cause of death was a stomach ulcer.

== Legacy and influence ==
Memorial plaque for Louisa Mark installed in Dalston Square, 2025.

Breakout was reissued as a double album on the Soul Jazz Records label in 2012 and as a Record Store Day release in 2023.

In 2020, Mark's song "Keep It Like It Is" was included in the soundtrack to Steve McQueen's BBC film Lovers Rock.

In 2023, artist Sonia Boyce included "Caught You In A Lie" as part of her Desert Island Discs.

On 13 September 2025 an engraved stone honouring Louisa was unveiled at Dalston Square in Hackney, in memory of her performances at The Four Aces Club which was located in the area.

== Discography ==
=== Albums ===
- Breakout (1981), Bushays

=== Singles ===
- "Caught You in a Lie" (1975), Safari - 7"
- "All My Loving" (1975), Safari - 7"
- "Even Though You're Gone" (1978), Bushays - 12"
- "Six Sixth Street" (1978), Bushays - 12"
- "Caught You in a Lie" (1979), Voyage International - 12", B-side by Clinton Grant
- "People in Love" (1980), Radic - 12"
- "Mum and Dad" (1982), Bushays, 12"
- "All My Loving (1984), Voyage International - 7"
- "Caught You in a Lie" (1984), Code - 12"
- "Hello There" (1984), Oak Sound - 12", Louisa Mark & Zabandis
- "Keep It Like It Is" (1986), Trojan - 7"/12"
- "Reunited" b/w "Reunited Stepping Out" with Kevin & The Bushrangers, Bushays, BFM 113, 12"
- "Foolish Fool", Sky Note, 12"
