= More Time (Linton Kwesi Johnson album) =

Studio album by Linton Kwesi Johnson
- Released: 1998
- Genre: Dub poetry
- Label: LKJ
- Producer: Dennis Bovell

Linton Kwesi Johnson chronology
A Cappella Live (1996)	More Time (1998)	Independent Intavenshan (1998)

More Time is an album by the Jamaican-British musician Linton Kwesi Johnson. It was released in 1998 through Johnson's LKJ Records. "Liesense fi Kill", about police brutality, was released as a single. Johnson supported the album with an international tour. The lyrics to many songs were reproduced in Johnson's book of poetry Mi Revalueshanary Fren.

== Production ==
Recorded in Switzerland, the album was produced by Dennis Bovell. Johnson was backed by Bovell's Dub Band. The album was delayed so that Johnson could attend to his literary career. The title track rails against the culture of British workaholism. "Reggae fi Bernard" is about the death of Johnson's nephew. "Reggae fi May Ayim" is dedicated to the poet May Ayim. "If I Waz a Top Natch Poet" references Johnson's roles of poet and popular musician, contrasting high and low art.

== Critical reception ==
Professional ratings
Review scores
Source	Rating
AllMusic	4/5 stars
Robert Christgau	(1-star Honorable Mention)
The Encyclopedia of Popular Music	3/5 stars
(The New) Rolling Stone Album Guide	3/5 stars

Robert Christgau, in Rolling Stone, opined that "L.K.J. may well be the subtlest political thinker in pop history, and bandleader Dennis Bovell's urbane skank proved to be Nineties reggae's most imaginative alternative to dance-hall boom-bah." Christgau also praised "If I Waz a Tap Natch Poet" and "Reggae fi Bernard". Billboard wrote that the album "is powered by [Johnson's] indefatigable rebel spirit and honed for maximum impact by 20 years of serious rhyme rocking."

AllMusic concluded that "despite his tweedy, bespectacled image, his politics are anything but objective or disengaged—he writes about social injustice in general and racism in particular with a quietly seething sense of outrage and an incisive wit."

== Track listing ==
No.	Title	Length
1.	"More Time"
2.	"Reggae fi Bernard"
3.	"Hurricane Blues"
4.	"Liesense fi Kill"
5.	"If I Waz a Top Natch Poet"
6.	"Reggae fi May Ayim"
7.	"Poems of Shape and Motion"
8.	"Seasons of the Heart"
9.	"New Word Hawdah"
