= Lloyd Coxsone =

Jamaican record producer (born c. 1945)

- Born: Lloyd Blackford c.1945
- Origin: Morant Bay, Jamaica
- Genres: Reggae dub
- Occupations: Record producer, Sound system operator
- Years active: 1960s-Present day
- Labels: Safari, Tribesman, Outernational

Lloyd Coxsone (born Lloyd Blackford, c. 1945) is a Jamaican-born sound system operator and record producer, who has been resident in the United Kingdom since 1962.

== Biography ==
Blackford was born in Morant Bay, Jamaica, c.1945, and moved to Wandsworth, London in 1962. With his surname borrowed from one of Jamaica's leading sound system operators and producers, Clement "Coxsone" Dodd, Blackford operated his own Coxsone Sound system in London from 1965 through to the 1980s, gaining a residency in the 1970s at the Roaring Twenties club in Carnaby Street.

In the early 1970s he began working as a producer, having success with one of the early lovers rock hits, Louisa Mark's "Caught You in a Lie"; Coxsone is credited with paving the way for lovers rock by incorporating soul records into his sound system sets. In the mid- and late-1970s he launched his own Safari, Tribesman and Outernational labels. Among his best-known works as a producer are two dub albums released in 1975 and 1982 - King of the Dub Rock and King of the Dub Rock part 2. These mixed his own productions featuring musicians such as Matumbi with rhythms produced in Jamaica by Gussie Clarke, with the second album also featuring mixes by Scientist. His other productions included the debut single by Levi Roots. In the mid-1980s, Coxsone took a back seat with his sound system, allowing younger men such as Blacker Dread to take a leading role.

Coxsone went into semi-retirement in the late 1980s, but later returned to the sound system circuit with his Sir Coxsone the Outernational system. He was paid tribute by I-Roy on the single "Lloyd Coxsone Time".

== Productions ==
- King of the Dub Rock (1975), Safari
- King of the Dub Rock Part 2 (1982), Tribesman
- 12 the Hard Way (1989), Tribesman
