= Poetry reading =

Public oral recitation of poetry

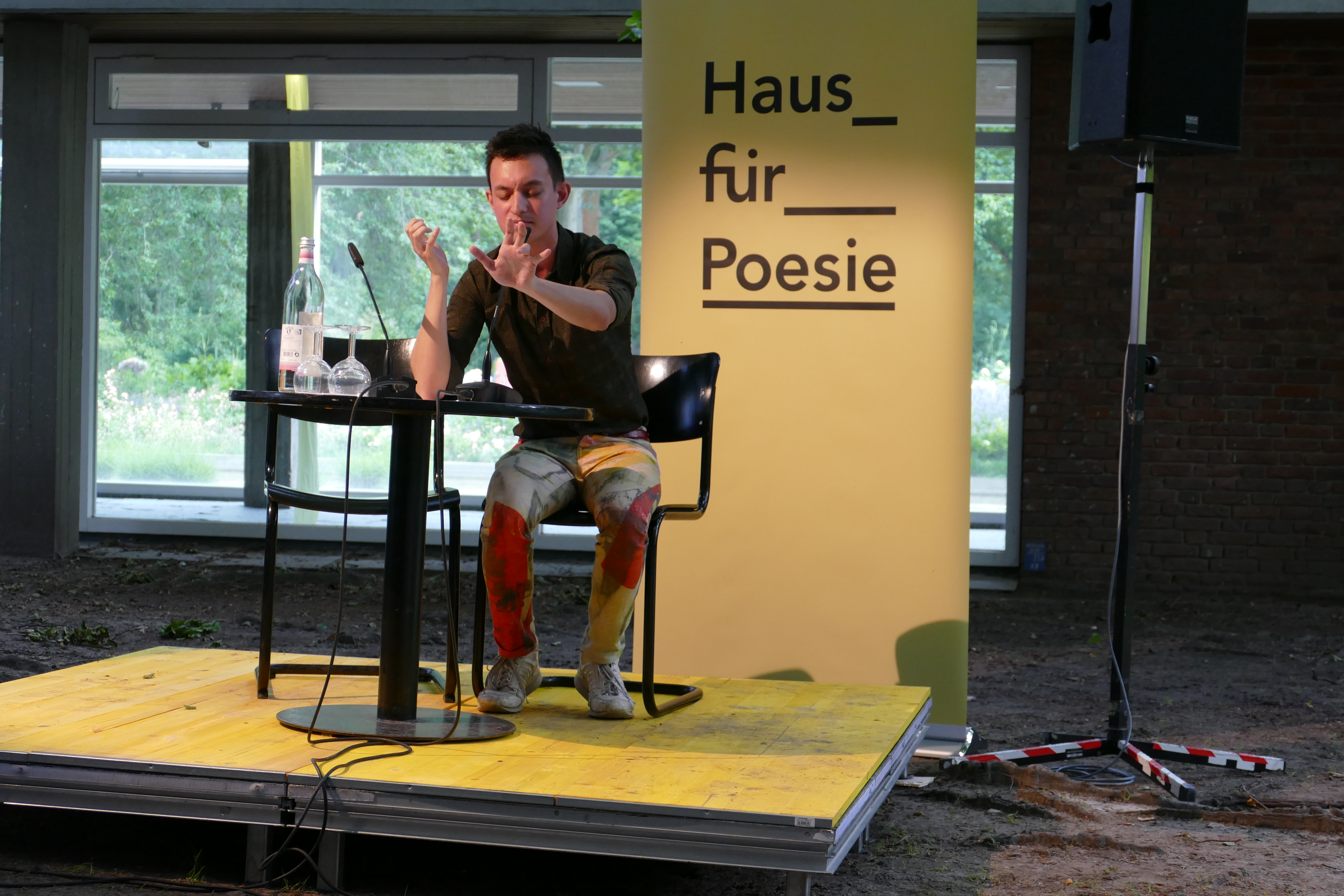
Kyle Dacuyan reading at a poetry festival in Berlin

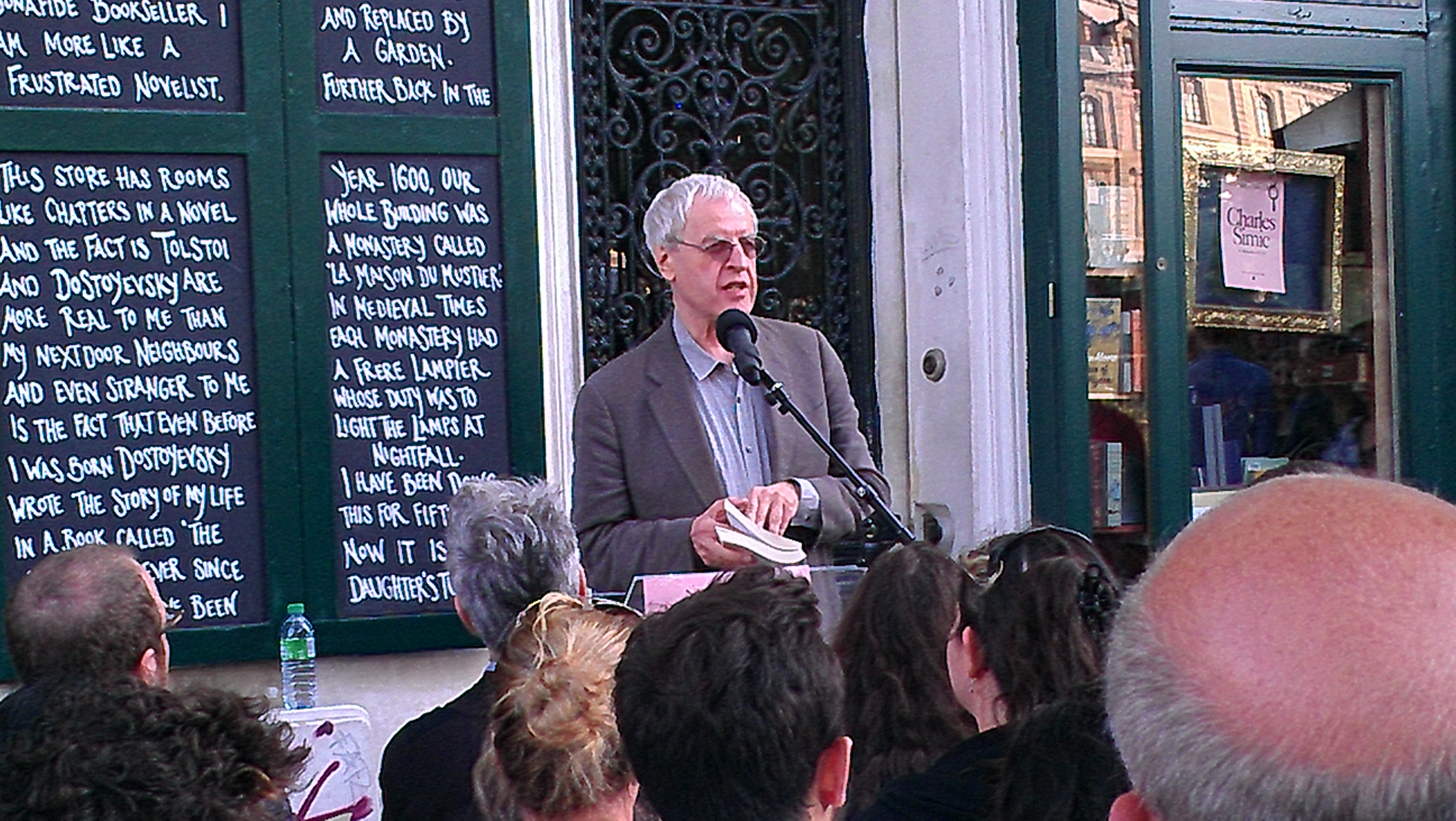
Charles Simic reading at Shakespeare & Co. (Paris, France) on July 11, 2013.

A poetry reading is a public oral recitation or performance of poetry. Reading poetry aloud allows the reader to express their own experience through poetry, changing the poem according to their sensibilities. The reader uses pitch and stress, and pauses become apparent. A poetry reading typically takes place on a small stage in a café or bookstore where multiple poets recite their own work. A more prominent poet may be chosen as the "headliner" of such an event and famous poets may also take the stage at a bigger venue such as an amphitheater or college auditorium.

How early poems like the Illiad were transmitted to audiences is not clear. Modern poetry readings only became popular in the last half of the twentieth century, at least in the United States, with stars like Dylan Thomas and Robert Frost. Live poetry reading competitions, called poetry slams and beginning in the 1980s, also remain popular.

== Background ==
Voice is an active, physical thing in oral poetry. It needs a speaker and a listener, a performer and an audience. It is a bodily creation that thrives in live connection. The voice is the mechanism by which a "poet's voice" comes alive. Reciting a poem aloud the reciter comes to understand and then to be the 'voice' of the poem. As poetry is a vocal art, the speaker brings their own experience to it, changing it according to their own sensibilities, intonation, the matter of sound making sense; controlled through pitch and stress, poems are full of invisible italicized contrasts. Reading poetry aloud also makes clear the "pause" as an element of poetry.

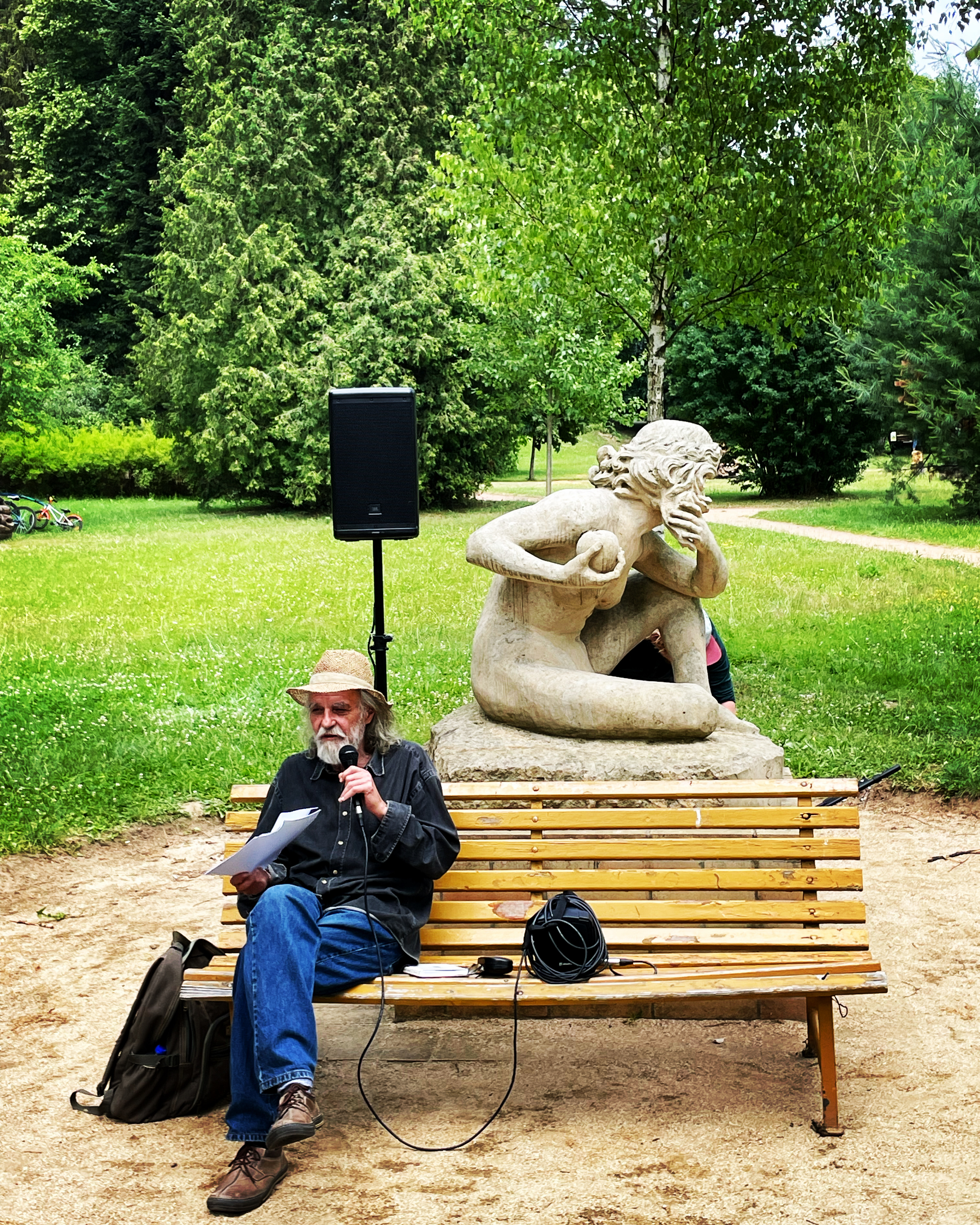
Marian Palla reading his poetry at a festival in Luhačovice, Czechia

"The hearing knowledge we bring to a line if poetry is a knowledge of patterns of speech we have known since we were infants." Every speaker intuitively course through manipulations of sounds, almost as if we sing to each other all day. Even after three millennia of writing, poetry retains its appeal to the ear, the silent reading eye thereof, thereafter, hears what it is seeing. Sound that was imagined through the eye gradually gave body to poems in performance.

A public reading is typically given on a small stage in a café or bookstore, although reading by prominent poets frequently are booked into larger venues such as amphitheaters and college auditoriums, 'to take poetry public'.

Poetry readings almost always involve poets reading their own work or reciting it from memory but readings often involve several readers (often called "featured poets" or "featureds"), although one poet can be chosen as a "headliner".

== History ==
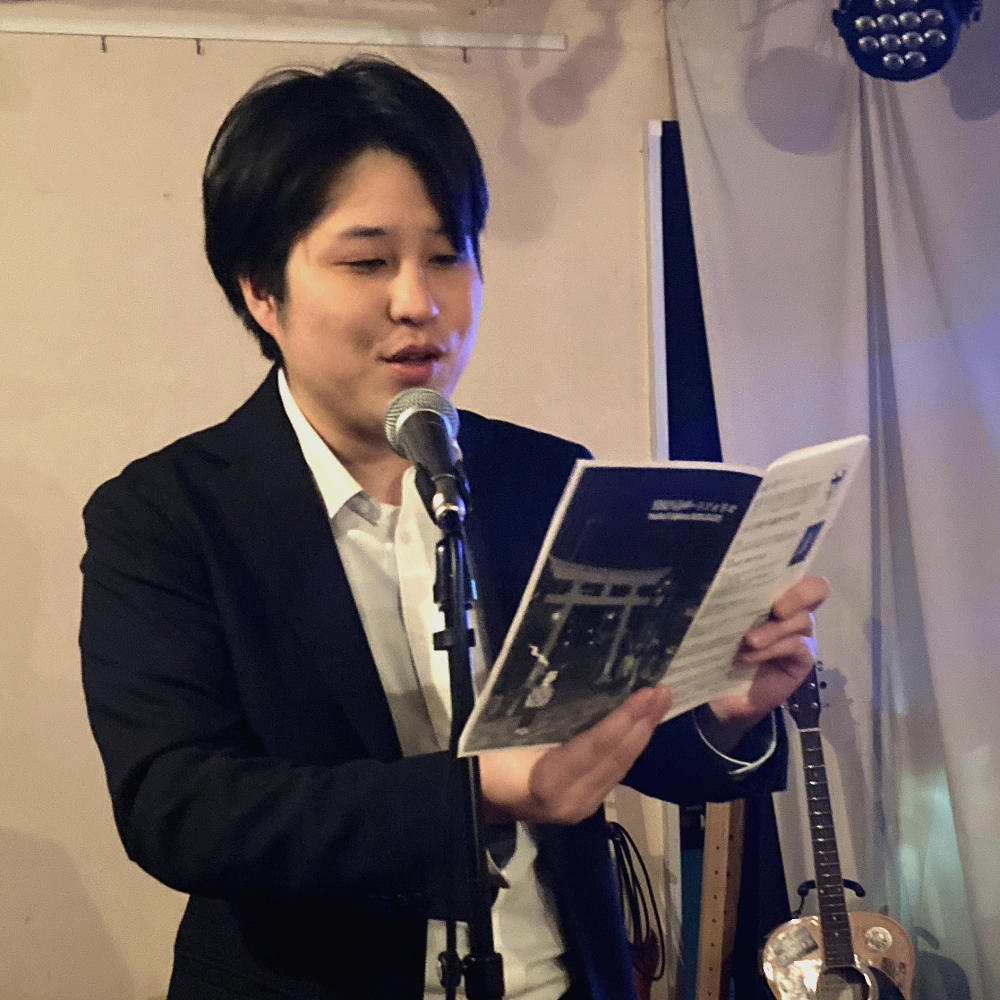
Hachijo Watanabe reading Kobo Musica

How early poems like the Illiad were first experienced by audiences remains unclear. (But see rhapsode)

American poet Donald Hall described the increase in emphasis on public readings of poetry in the United States in a 2012 New Yorker magazine blog post where he recounted it a phenomenon that grew in the last half of the twentieth century.

Hall, who speculates that the change may have been due to the star power of Dylan Thomas (1914-1953), wrote, "It used to be that one poet in each generation performed poems in public. In the twenties, it was Vachel Lindsay, who sometimes dropped to his knees in the middle of a poem. Then Robert Frost took over, and made his living largely on the road." Hall suggests that poetry readings have shifted the focus of poetry more towards sound, adding that "In concentrating on sound, as in anything else, there are things to beware of. Revising a poem one morning, I found myself knowing that a new phrase was repellent, but realized it would pass if I intoned it out loud. Watch out. A poem must work from the platform but it must also work on the page." Afroamerican poet Maya Angelou was a friend of Malcolm X, and she performed poetry readings. Radical poet group The Last Poets performed poetry reading with African conga, and Gil Scott-Heron plays poetry reading with jazz music. Dub poet Linton Kwesi Johnson recorded poetry reggae album "Bass Culture" in 1980.

== Poetry slam ==
A poetry slam is a competitive format that has become increasingly popular, especially in the United States, since its inception in the 1980s. A "slam" is the art of poetry presented in public as is the "open mic" event variant.

== See also ==
- Dub poetry
- Spoken word
- Gil Scott-Heron
- The Last Poets
- Hip hop
- Performance poetry
- Poet laureate
- Sound poetry
- Puerto Rican Poetry
- Liverpool poets
