= Michael Okoro =

Michael Okoro may refer to:

- Michael Okoro, drummer with The Cats (reggae band), which produced a few singles in 1968
- Michael Nnachi Okoro (born 1940), Bishop of the Roman Catholic Diocese of Abakaliki
