= Race Today =

British political magazine

- Founder: Institute of Race Relations
- Founded: 1969
- Final issue: 1988
- Country: United Kingdom
- Language: English

Race Today was a monthly (later bimonthly) British political magazine. Launched in 1969 by the Institute of Race Relations, it was from 1973 published by the Race Today Collective, which included figures such as Darcus Howe, Farrukh Dhondy, Linton Kwesi Johnson, Leila Hassan and Jean Ambrose. The magazine was a leading organ of Black politics in 1970s Britain; publication ended in 1988.

== History ==
Race Today was established in 1969 by the Institute of Race Relations. From 1973 onward, the monthly magazine was under the direction of a breakaway organisation, the Brixton-based Race Today Collective. This body aimed for a political rather than scholarly approach, based on a combination of libertarian Marxism and radical anti-racism.

The magazine's first editor under the new leadership was journalist and broadcaster Darcus Howe, who was much influenced by Trinidadian Marxist C. L. R. James, and under Howe's tenure Race Today became a leading voice of Black political journalism in Britain. (James would later live his final years in the building that housed the office of Race Today, at 165 Railton Road in Brixton, where a blue plaque was installed by English Heritage in 2004.) A compilation of Howe's arguments in Race Today appeared in a 1978 pamphlet entitled The Road Make to Walk on Carnival Day.

Farrukh Dhondy, later the author of a biography of C. L. R. James, began his writing career with Race Today in 1970. Another notable member of the Race Today Collective was Linton Kwesi Johnson, who joined the group in 1974. His first book of poems appeared the same year under the Race Today imprint, and he later served as the magazine's arts editor. The publication and its editor feature prominently in the song "Man Free (For Darcus Howe)" on Linton Kwesi Johnson's 1978 debut album Dread Beat an' Blood with his then band Poet and the Roots.

In the mid-1970, the Race Today Collective allied with the Black Panther Movement formed by John La Rose, who had been the chairman of the Institute of Race Relations in 1972 and 1973. In 1978, the magazine's publication frequency changed from monthly to bimonthly.

In 1985, Leila Hassan became the journal's editor; both the magazine and the Race Today Collective were discontinued in 1988. Described as "the most articulate organ of British Black politics in the 1970s", Race Today maintained close ties to the Notting Hill Carnival.

Race Today Publications was one of the organisers of the International Book Fair of Radical Black and Third World Books, together with New Beacon Books and Bogle-L'Ouverture Publications.

In September 2019, the book Here to Stay, Here to Fight: A Race Today Anthology, edited by Paul Field, Robin Bunce, Leila Hassan and Margaret Peacock, was published by Pluto Press. Race Today (2020), a film documenting the Race Today collective and its influence, was directed by Wayne G. Saunders, with Jean Ambrose as screenwriter and Linton Kwesi Johnson in the cast.

In March 2023, to commemorate what would have been the 80th birthday of Darcus Howe, the Race Today Legacy Collective launched the magazine's online digital archive. The launch at Goldsmiths University of London coincided with the publication of a commemorative Special Issue, the first publication of Race Today since 1988, edited by Leila Hassan, Deirdre Osborne and Margaret Peacock. Gary Younge gave the keynote lecture at the event.
