= A Cappella Live =

Live album by Linton Kwesi Johnson
- Released: 1996
- Recorded: 1993–1994
- Genre: Dub poetry, a cappella
- Length: 42:38
- Label: LKJ Records

Linton Kwesi Johnson chronology
LKJ Presents (1996)	A Cappella Live (1996)	More Time (1999)

Professional ratings
Review scores
Source	Rating
Allmusic	4/5 stars

A Cappella Live is an album by Jamaican dub poet Linton Kwesi Johnson released in 1996 on the LKJ Records label. LKJ performs all the tracks, recorded at various venues in 1993 and 1994, without any accompaniment.

== Track listing ==
All tracks are written by Linton Kwesi Johnson

No.	Title	Length
1.	"Five Nights of Bleeding"	4:05
2.	"Reggae Sounds"	1:24
3.	"Bass Culture"	2:16
4.	"Sonny's Lettah"	2:46
5.	"It Noh Funny"	1:53
6.	"New Craas Massahkah"	5:28
7.	"Di Great Insohreckshan"	2:06
8.	"Reggae Fi Dada"	3:49
9.	"Story"	1:33
10.	"Mi Revahlueshanary Fren"	3:35
11.	"Tings an Times"	5:14
12.	"Di Anfinish Revahlueshan"	2:36
13.	"If I Woz a Tap Natch Poet"	2:57
14.	"Hurricane Blues"	2:56

== Recording ==
- 1, 2, 5-7 recorded Beurschouwburg, Brussels, 1993
- 3, 4 recorded Dal Segno, Nijmegen, 1993
- 8, 13, 14 recorded Ronnie Scott's Jazz Club, Soho, London, 1994
- 9, 10, 12, 14 recorded St. Mark's Church, Piccadilly, London, 1993.

== Personnel ==
- Linton Kwesi Johnson – vocals
