= Richard Archer (disambiguation) =

Richard Archer (born 1977) is a musician in Hard-Fi.

Richard Archer (or variants) may also refer to:

- Richard Archer, bassist for The Cats (reggae band)
- Richard Archer (politician) (1927–2009), Australian politician

== See also ==
- Richard Archer Prince (1858–1937), murderer
