= Jean Ambrose (activist) =

British anti-racism activist

Jean Ambrose is a British anti-racist activist. In the 1970s and 1980s she was active in Race Today, the Brixton-based collective and political journal.

Like Leila Hassan, Ambrose was a member of the Black Unity and Freedom Party, and she joined the Race Today collective soon after its establishment in 1974. After the 1981 New Cross house fire she was active in the New Cross Massacre Action Committee (NCMAC).

Ambrose wrote the script for Race Today, a 2020 documentary directed by Wayne G. Saunders. She also appeared as herself in George Amponsah's 2021 documentary Black Power: A British Story of Resistance.
