= Dread Beat an' Blood =

Studio album by Poet and the Roots
- Released: 1978 (UK)
- Recorded: 1978
- Studio: Gooseberry, London
- Genre: Dub reggae, dub poetry
- Length: 37:52
- Label: Front Line
- Producer: Linton Kwesi Johnson; Vivian Weathers on "Song of Blood"

Poet and the Roots chronology
Dread Beat an' Blood (1978)	Forces of Victory (1979)

Professional ratings
Review scores
Source	Rating
AllMusic	5/5 stars

Dread Beat an' Blood is the debut album by British reggae band Poet and the Roots released in 1978 on the Front Line label. It was produced by Vivian Weathers and Linton Kwesi Johnson. The "Poet" is dub poet Johnson and "the Roots" are Dennis Bovell, Lloyd "Jah Bunny" Donaldson, Desmond Craig, Winston Curniffe, Everald Forrest, Floyd Lawson, John Varnom, Lila Weathers and Vivian Weathers. Vivian Weathers and Winston Curniffe were school friends of Johnson's. They all attended Tulse Hill Secondary School. Most of the tracks are based on poems that first appeared in Johnson's 1975 book of poetry Dread Beat an' Blood.

This album was the result of collaboration between Johnson, who had been active as a journalist and reggae critic as well as a poet, and musician and producer Bovell. The combination of Bovell's heavy dub rhythms and Johnson's monotone intonation of his poetry created a whole new genre of reggae: dub poetry.

In subsequent re-releases of the album, the artist is sometimes given as Linton Kwesi Johnson. The album was listed in the 1999 book The Rough Guide: Reggae: 100 Essential CDs.

== Background and recording ==
Johnson first got involved in recording after an acquaintance at the Natty Dread ABC project in Brixton asked him to write copy and advertisements for the Virgin Records Front Line releases. While at a recording studio, Johnson suggested recording a poetry reading, which Richard Branson agreed to finance.

After recording three demos, Virgin agreed £2,000 to record the album, which was recorded with Bovell, whom Johnson had previously interviewed for a BBC programme. Bovell and Lloyd "Jah Bunny" Donaldson were both in Matumbi.

== Lyrical content ==
Johnson was the first person to accurately describe the situation of the black British youth in the inner cities in the late 1970s and early 1980s. This theme runs through most of the songs on this and his other albums, but is particularly evident in the last vocal song on the album, "All Wi Doin' Is Defendin'", which is remarkably prescient as it foresees the 1981 Brixton riot in some detail and justifies it before it had even happened.

== Track listing ==
All tracks by Linton Kwesi Johnson

1. "Dread Beat an' Blood" – 2:51
2. "Five Nights of Bleeding (for Leroy Harris)" – 4:32
3. "Doun Di Road" – 2:25
4. "Song of Blood" – 6:26
5. "It Dread Inna Inglan (for George Lindo)" – 4:04
6. "Come Wi Goh Dung Deh" – 3:44
7. "Man Free (for Darcus Howe)" – 5:53
8. "All Wi Doin' Is Defendin'" – 2:57

On some later re-releases on CD the following tracks also appear

9. "Command Counsel"
10. "Defense" (dub)

== Personnel ==
- Linton Kwesi Johnson - vocals, percussion
- Floyd Lawson - bass, rhythm guitar
- Lloyd "Jah Bunny" Donaldson, Winston "Crab" Curniffe - drums, percussion
- Everald Forrest - percussion
- Dennis Bovell - guitar, keyboards on "Doun di Road"
- Vivian Weathers - bass, rhythm guitar, vocals on "Song of Blood"
- Lila Weathers - vocals on "Man Free (for Darcus Howe)"
- John Varnom - guitar on "All Wi Doin' is Defendin'"
- Desmond Craig - keyboards on "All Wi Doin' is Defendin'"

Technical

- Dennis "Blackbeard" Bovell - engineer, remixing
- Una Howe - sleeve drawing
- Julian Stapleton - sleeve design
