= The Funkees =

Nigerian afro-rock group

- Origin: Nigeria
- Genres: Afro rock; Afrobeat; funk; jazz fusion; psychedelic rock
- Years active: Late 1960s–1977
- Members: Harry Mosco; Chyke Madu; Sonny Akpabio; Jake N. Sollo; Danny Heibs; Tony Mallett; Mohammed Ahidjo; Roli Paterson

The Funkees were a Nigerian afro-rock group formed in the late 1960s. They moved to London in 1973 and quickly gained prominence in the expatriate West African and West Indian music scene, but fragmented four years later. They specialised in funky, upbeat, highly danceable afro-rock that often featured lyrics sung in Igbo, as well as English. Originating as an army band after the Nigerian Civil War, they contributed to the outpouring of upbeat music produced by young people in Nigeria in response to the darkness of the recently concluded civil conflict. An article in The Guardian (2018) relates percussionist Sonny Akpan’s reminiscences that the Funkees’ music 'contributed to healing Nigeria’s divisions' after the Civil War, quoting his observation that “(w)hen you started playing good music everybody forgot. Things started getting normal.”

In 2012, Soundway Records reissued a compilation of their recordings from the mid-1970s, leading to a resurgence of interest in the band. Percussionist Sonny Akpan (aka Jah Wisdom) later went on to play with experimental dub musicians' collective, African Head Charge, featuring on the well-received album, Songs of Praise (1990), their live album Pride And Joy ( 1991 ) and In Pursuit of Shashamane Land (1995).

== Members ==
- Mohammed Ahidjo — lead vocals, percussion
- Jake N. Sollo — lead guitar, backing vocals, organ, piano
- Harry Mosco — rhythm guitar, backing vocals, gong
- Danny Heibs — bass, backing vocals, percussion
- Chyke Madu — drums, backing vocals
- Sonny Akpabio — congas, backing vocals
- Roli Paterson — bongos, percussion
- Sunny Akpan - bongos, congas, percussion
- Tony Mallett

== Discography ==
- 1974 — Point of No Return
- 1976 — Now I'm A Man
- 2012 — Dancing Time: The Best of Eastern Nigeria's Afro Rock Exponents 1973-77 (reissue compilation)
