= Poet and the Roots =

- Origin: London, England
- Genres: Dub
- Years active: 1977–1978
- Label: Virgin Records
- Members: Linton Kwesi Johnson; Dennis Bovell; Lloyd "Jah Bunny" Donaldson; Desmond Craig; Winston Curniffe; Everald Forrest; Floyd Lawson; John Varnom; Lila Weathers; Vivian Weathers

Poet and the Roots are a reggae band formed to record dub poet Linton Kwesi Johnson's poems with dub backing tracks.

The recordings were on the Virgin Records label. Johnson released his later material under his own name, although some of the musicians from this group appeared on his subsequent albums.

== Discography ==
=== Album ===
- Dread Beat an' Blood, Virgin Records, 1978

=== Singles ===
- "All Wi Doin' Is Defendin'", Virgin Records, 1977
- "It Dread Inna Inglan (For George Lindo)", Virgin Records, 1978
