= Point of View (Matumbi song) =

"Point of View (Squeeze a Little Lovin')"

Single by Matumbi
- A-side: "Point of View (Squeeze a Little Lovin')"
- B-side: "Pretender"
- Released: 1979
- Recorded: 1979
- Genre: Reggae, lovers rock
- Length: 3:12
- Label: Matumbi
- Songwriter(s): Bevin Fagan, Valerie Davis ("Point of View"); Dennis Bovell, Jah Bunny ("Pretender")
- Producer(s): Errol Thompson

"Point of View (Squeeze a Little Lovin')" is a 1979 song by Matumbi. It made No. 35 on the UK Singles Chart.
