= Swan Lake (The Cats song) =

Single by The Cats
- A-side: "Swan Lake"
- B-side: Swing Low
- Released: 1968
- Genre: West Indian style ska
- Length: 2:40
- Label: BAF Records

"Swan Lake" is a song by the Cats. It is a cover of Swan Lake by Pyotr Ilyich Tchaikovsky and reached No. 48 on the UK Singles Chart in early 1969, making them the first British reggae band to have a top fifty hit in the UK.

== In popular culture ==
- British ska band Madness did a cover version of "Swan Lake" on their 1979 debut album One Step Beyond....
- In spite of a remark he made earlier on in his career saying "reggae is vile", the song appears on Morrissey's compilation album Under the Influence.
