= Leila Hassan =

British editor and activist (born 1948)

- Born: Leila Ramadhan Hassan; 13 June 1948 (age 78); British protectorate of Zanzibar (now in Tanzania)
- Other names: Leila Howe, Leila Hassan Howe
- Citizenship: British
- Occupations: Editor and activist
- Known for: Editor of Race Today
- Spouse: Darcus Howe

Leila Hassan Howe (born 13 June 1948) is a British editor and activist, who was a founding member of the Race Today Collective in 1973, having previously worked for the Institute of Race Relations. She became editor of the Race Today journal in 1986. Hassan was also a member of the Black Unity and Freedom Party. She is co-editor of a collection of writings from Race Today published in 2019.

== Career ==
Hassan was a member of the Race Today Collective from its inception in 1973, and eventually became editor of its journal, Race Today, in 1986. She was deputy editor of the journal from 1973, with Darcus Howe as editor. She was a frequent writer for the journal, examining topics ranging from the Black Power movement in the USA to the lives of black women in the UK.

In the 1970s, with the Race Today Collective she campaigned on behalf of the Asian factory workers' struggles in the Midlands, when a strike at Leicester's Imperial Typewriters factory in 1974 – characterised by Hassan Howe as "one of the most powerful strikes of the time" – received no union support.

During the 1980s, she worked alongside Olive Morris running Race Today's "Basement Sessions" at Railton Road, where art, culture and politics were discussed. The Race Today Collective was led and organised by a number of women, including Hassan, whose influence on its direction needs further recognition (according to Robin Bunce and Paul Field, biographers of her husband). Women involved in the organisation included Altheia Jones-LeCointe, Barbara Beese and Mala Dhondy. In 1984, Hassan organised for the wives of striking coal miners to come to London to tell their stories to the journal. Hassan also campaigned for Arts Council England to recognise the Notting Hill Carnival as an art form. Following the New Cross Fire in January 1981, in which 13 young Black people died, Hassan was co-organiser of the 20,000-person Black People's Day of Action march through London that took place on 2 March and is now described as "a turning point in black British identity".

Hassan became involved in the Black Power movement in the late 1960s. She worked for the Institute of Race Relations (IRR) from 1970, as Information Officer. During her time there she helped to overthrow the IRR's paternalistic organisation, moving it from a conservative to a more radical political stance. This change in the IRR came about through a membership vote, in which Hassan had been instrumental in recruiting more members who sympathised with the proposed new direction of the organisation. She was a member of the Black Unity and Freedom Party before she became involved in the collective.

A 2013 exhibition about the British Black Panthers at the Photofusion Gallery in Brixton featured an interview with Hassan Howe. Alongside other former Panthers, she acted as a script advisor for John Ridley's 2017 television series Guerrilla, which examines the movement.

In 2019, Hassan Howe co-edited Here to Stay, Here to Fight, a collection of writings from Race Today, published by Pluto Press, which aimed to introduce new audiences to Britain's black radical politics.

In January 2024, she was awarded an honorary fellowship by Goldsmiths, University of London.

== Personal life ==
Leila Ramadhan Hassan was born on 13 June 1948 in Zanzibar; and she grew in a practising Muslim family.

Hassan was married to the civil rights activist Darcus Howe, who was her predecessor as editor of Race Today.

== Selected works ==
- Field, Paul; Robin Bunce; Leila Hassan; Margaret Peacock, eds. (20 September 2019). Here to Stay, Here to Fight: A Race Today Anthology. Pluto Press. doi:10.2307/j.ctvpbnn5q. ISBN 978-1-78680-483-9. JSTOR j.ctvpbnn5q. S2CID 241093719.
- Dhondy, Farrukh; Barbara Beese; Leila Hassan (1982). The black explosion in British schools. London: Race Today. ISBN 0-9503498-6-0. OCLC 12696281.
