= John Kpiaye =

English reggae musician (born 1948)

- Born: John Ogetti Kpiaye; 1948 (age 77–78)
- Origin: East End of London
- Genres: Reggae
- Years active: 1966–present

John Ogetti Kpiaye (born 1948) is a reggae session and live guitarist. He was a member of The Cats who had a No. 48 UK hit with "Swan Lake", and Matumbi, who had a No. 35 hit with "Point of View (Squeeze a Little Lovin')".

== Career ==
Born in the East End of London to an English mother and a Nigerian father, Kpiaye began a career as a welder on leaving school at the age of fifteen. In 1966, he took up guitar after being given one by his mother and formed The Hustlin' Kind in 1967, who later changed their name to The Cats. The band's 1968 single "Swan Lake" reached No. 48 in the UK Singles Chart and led to the band touring Europe.

After The Cats split up in 1971, Kpiaye joined the In Brackets, a backing band that worked with artists such as Dandy Livingstone, Owen Gray and Winston Groovy, and from 1973 worked as a producer in the emerging London lovers rock scene.In 1976 he began writing and producing for dennis Harris's new Lovers Rock label. Using the pseudonym "Brownie T", he wrote and produced songs for Brown Sugar (In Love With a Dreadlocks, Black Pride), Casandra and others. As an in-demand session guitarist Kpiaye played on countless tracks for UK artists.

During the late 1970s and early 1980s, he recorded with Ijahman Levi, Aswad, Dennis Brown, Steve Gregory and Linton Kwesi Johnson among others, often working with Dennis Bovell. In 1982, he joined The Dennis Bovell Dub Band, touring as backing band for Linton Kwesi Johnson for over 30 years.

In 1997, he released the solo instrumental album Red, Gold and Blues.
