= The Cats (reggae band) =

English ska ensemble (1967–1971)

- Origin: Mile End, London, England
- Genres: Ska, reggae
- Years active: 1967-1971
- Label: BAF
- Past members: Tyrone Patterson; Richard Archer; John Ogetti Kpiaye; Michael Okoro

The Cats, previously known as the Hustlin' Kind, were a ska ensemble from Mile End, London. The group's lineup comprised Tyrone Patterson (keyboards), Richard Archer (bass), John Kpiaye (guitar), and Michael Okoro (drums).

== History ==
They were initially an instrumental band, playing ska and soul covers in London clubs, changing the band name to the Cats in summer 1968. The group recorded ten tracks at Maximum Sound studios in Old Kent Road in September 1968.

Their 1968 single, "Swan Lake", backed by "Swing Low", hit No. 48 on the UK Singles Chart in early 1969, making them the first British reggae band to have a top fifty hit in the UK. According to Kpiaye, "Swan Lake" was recorded during the Maximum Sound session; the single was released on the group's own Baf label. "Swan Lake" was later covered by Madness on their debut album One Step Beyond.... Subsequent releases by the Cats failed to chart, rendering them as one-hit wonders.

== Discography ==
=== Singles ===
Record label	Record number	Year	Title
BAF	BAF1	1968	"Swan Lake" / "Swing Low"
BAF	BAF2	1968	"My Girl" / "The Hog"
BAF	BAF3	1968	"The Hog" / "Blues for Justice"
BAF	BAF4	1968	"William Tell" / "Love Walk Right In"
BAF	BAF5	1968	"Falling in Love" / "Don't Mess with Cupid"
Crystal	CR 7009	1970	"Sherman" / "What Can I Do"
Groove	GVE 1001	1976	"Swan Lake" (re-recording) / "Swan Lake" (disco version)
