= Nick Straker =

British musician

Nick Straker (born Nicholas Charles Bailey) is a London-born musician, who had hits in Europe and the US in the late 1970s and early 1980s.

== Career ==
Straker joined his first band, called Stonehenge, in 1969. The band changed its name in 1971 to Matumbi, Dennis Bovell's reggae band who had signed to Trojan Records, but Straker left in 1974. Along with his friend, guitarist Dave McShera, Straker joined Pete Hammond (bass) and Phil Towner (drums) in a dance band playing working men's clubs and weddings. They then met American soul singer Limmie Snell, and the band became Limmie Funk Limited with Andy Gierus on guitar. They played discotheques around the country and toured the Netherlands and Sweden in early 1978.

Tony Mansfield, later the lead singer and songwriter with New Musik, joined, originally as roadie, but eventually he and Straker formed a collaboration that led to the recording of a successful UK single, "A Walk in the Park", in 1979. A year later, the track was re-recorded and released and made number 20 in the UK Singles Chart.

The Nick Straker Band released a few more singles, but none had the success of "A Walk in the Park" in the UK, although "A Little Bit of Jazz" reached number 1 on the U.S. Hot Dance Club Play chart in 1981. Straker re-recorded "A Walk in the Park" in 1987; the new version was produced by Stock Aitken Waterman and charted at only number 82 in the UK.
