= Harry Mosco =

- Also known as: Harry Mosco
- Born: Moses Azuka Agada; 26 December 1949; Egede, Udi Local Government Area, Enugu State, Nigeria
- Origin: Nigeria
- Died: 19 March 2012 (aged 62) Cairo, Egypt
- Genres: Afro-rock, highlife, Afro-pop, funk, disco
- Occupations: Singer, songwriter, guitarist, record producer
- Years active: 1966–2012
- Labels: Tabansi Records, others

Harry Mosco (born Moses Azuka Agada; 26 December 1949 – 19 March 2012) was a Nigerian singer, guitarist, and record producer. He was the founder and bandleader of the Afro-rock group The Funkees he was also lead vocalist and guitarist. He later released successful solo albums, including Country Boy and Sugar Cane Baby. His career spanned from the highlife movement of the 1960s to the Afro-funk and disco era of the 1980s, making him one of the early architects of modern Nigerian pop music.

== Early life ==
Moses Azuka Agada was born on 26 December 1949 in Egede, Udi Local Government Area of Enugu State, Nigeria, to Jeremiah and Margaret Ugoha Agada of the Agada family in Umunonogbangu, Ameke kindred. After losing his father at the age of two, he was raised by his uncle Wilfred Agada, an engine driver with the Nigerian Railways. Frequent relocations due to his uncle’s work made formal schooling difficult, but he completed his primary education in 1959. He developed a strong interest in music from an early age and became an accomplished guitarist during his teenage years.

== Musical career ==
=== Early years (1966 – 1969) ===
Between 1966 and 1969, Agada performed with Celestine Ukwu and the Philosophers, one of Nigeria’s leading highlife bands. His guitar contributions featured on several notable tracks, including “Ije Enu”, “Usondu”, and “Oyi Igede”. The mentorship of Celestine Ukwu refined his musical technique and exposed him to the professional Nigerian music circuit.

=== The Funkees (1970 – 1977) ===
After the Nigerian Civil War, Harry Mosco formed the afro‑rock band The Funkees, serving as the group’s leader, guitarist, and lead vocalist on many songs. He worked with musicians such as Chyke Madu, who was a key member of the band from its early days. The Funkees blended afro-rock, funk, and highlife, creating a distinctive sound that combined elements of West African and Western musical styles. The band became one of the most energetic acts of the 1970s and achieved national success with singles like “Akula / Onye Mmanya” and “Akpakoro”. Their songs often featured lyrics in both Igbo and English, reflecting Nigeria’s cultural diversity. In 1972, The Funkees relocated to the United Kingdom to expand their reach and gained international recognition performing across Europe.

In 1977, The Funkees were invited to perform at the Second World Black and African Festival of Arts and Culture (FESTAC ’77) in Lagos. Following the event, they toured Nigeria extensively. However, upon returning to their base in London, factional disagreements among members led to the group’s breakup. As lead vocalist, Mosco subsequently embarked on a solo career.

=== Solo career (1978 – 1980s) ===
After the split, Mosco secured label support from Nigerian businessman **G.A.D. Tabansi** and released his debut album For You Specially (1978). Although the record met modest commercial response, he continued to perform and record, including collaborations with Ghanaian-born artist Nana Love.

His follow-up albums, Country Boy (1978) and Sugar Cane Baby (1982), achieved significant commercial and critical success. They blended Afro-pop, disco, and highlife with danceable rhythms, earning Mosco a major place in Nigeria’s post-highlife sound. Other works such as Peace & Harmony (1979) and Heartbreak (1983) further cemented his reputation as one of Nigeria’s most versatile musicians.

In 1997, he founded **H.M. Studios** in Lagos, a state-of-the-art recording facility that supported emerging Nigerian musicians. He was also among the early members of the **Performing Musicians Association of Nigeria (PMAN)**, contributing to artist advocacy and industry growth.

== Personal life ==
Harry Mosco was married and later divorced, with two children from the marriage. He was the father of several children, including Paul, Nadia, Dwayne, Adanna & Chike. Known for his humility and generosity, he served as a mentor and father figure to many younger artists and contributed to cultural projects in Lagos and his hometown of Egede.

== Death ==
In early 2012, Mosco’s health deteriorated, and he was flown to the **Nasser Institute Hospital** in Cairo, Egypt, where he died on **19 March 2012** after a long illness.

== Legacy ==
Harry Mosco is regarded as one of the pioneers who bridged Nigeria’s highlife, funk, and Afro-pop sounds. His influence can be heard in modern Nigerian pop and Afrobeat music. His records have been reissued internationally, and his compositions sampled by contemporary producers. In 2019, *The Vinyl Factory* reissued his 1979 LP Peace & Harmony, praising its blend of “boogie, funk and Afro-disco rhythms that shaped a generation of Lagos nightlife.”

== Discography ==
=== With The Funkees ===
- Point of No Return (1974)
- Now I’m a Man (1976)
- Singles: “Akula / Onye Mmanya”, “Akpakoro”

=== Solo albums ===
- For You Specially (1978)
- Country Boy (1978)
- Peace & Harmony (1979)
- Sugar Cane Baby (1982)
- Heartbreak (1983)
