= Linton Kwesi Johnson =

Jamaican poet and activist (born 1952)

Linton Kwesi Johnson CD
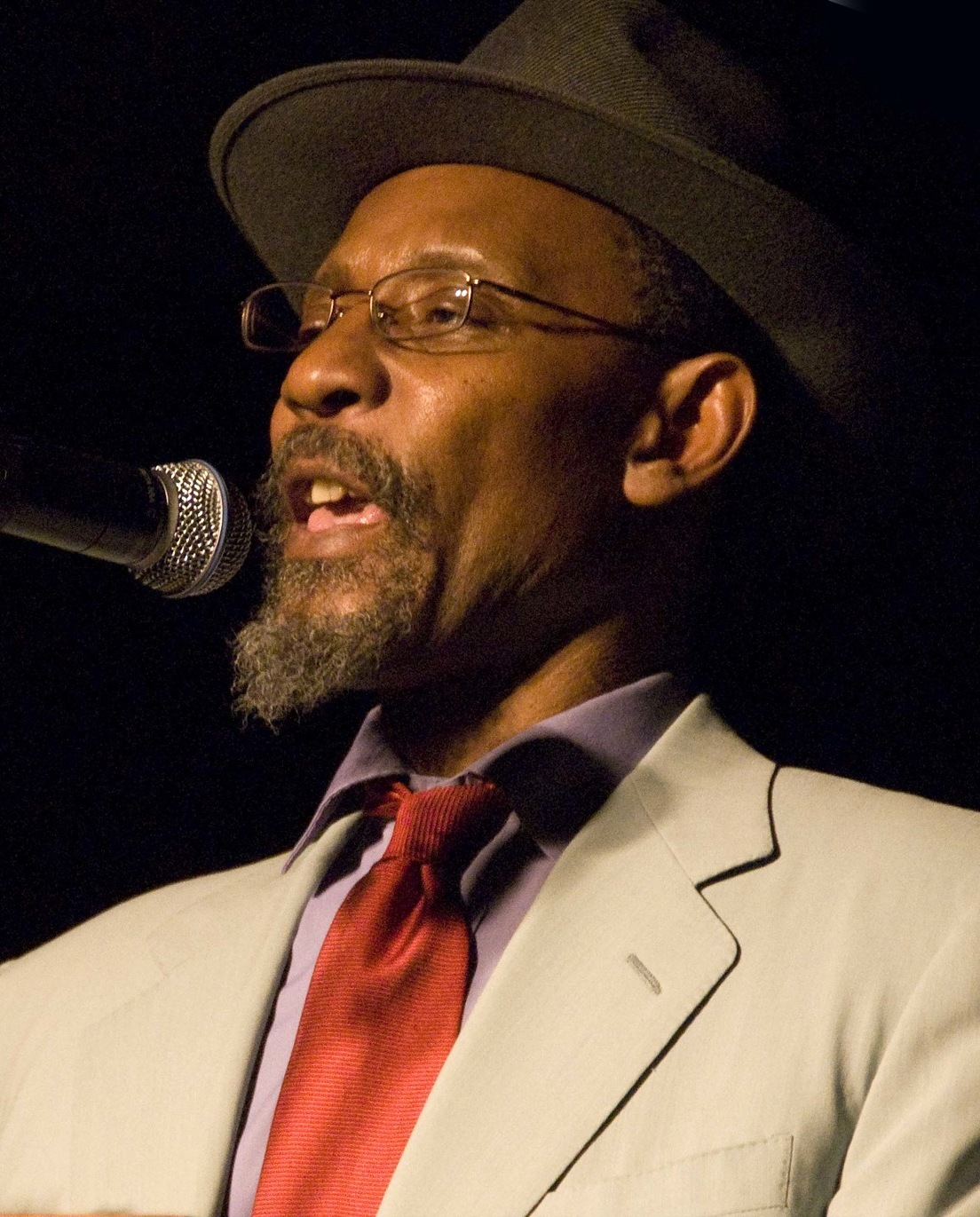
- Johnson in 2007
- Born: 24 August 1952 (age 73); Chapelton, Clarendon, Colony of Jamaica, British Empire
- Other name: LKJ
- Education: Goldsmiths College
- Occupations: Dub poet and activist
- Years active: 1978–present
- Awards: Order of Distinction; PEN Pinter Prize
- Website: lintonkwesijohnson.co.uk

Linton Kwesi Johnson CD (born 24 August 1952), also known as LKJ, is a Jamaican-born, British-based dub poet and activist. In 2002, he became the second living poet, and the only black one, to be published in the Penguin Modern Classics series. His performance poetry involves the recitation of his own verse in Jamaican patois over dub-reggae, usually written in collaboration with reggae producer/artist Dennis Bovell.

== Early life ==
Johnson was born in Chapelton, a small town in the rural parish of Clarendon, Jamaica. His middle name, "Kwesi", is a Ghanaian name given to boys who, like Johnson, are born on a Sunday. In 1963, he and his father went to live in Brixton, London, joining his mother, who had immigrated to Britain as part of the Windrush generation shortly before Jamaican independence in 1962. Johnson attended Tulse Hill School in Lambeth. While still at school, he joined the British Black Panther Movement, helped to organise a poetry workshop within the movement, and developed his work with Rasta Love, a group of poets and drummers.

Johnson studied sociology at Goldsmiths College in New Cross, London, graduating in 1973. Speaking in a 2018 interview about his start as a poet, he said: "I began to write verse, not only because I liked it, but because it was a way of expressing the anger, the passion of the youth of my generation in terms of our struggle against racial oppression. Poetry was a cultural weapon in the black liberation struggle, so that's how it began." During the early to mid-1970s, he was employed as the first paid library resources and education officer at the Keskidee Centre, where his poem Voices of the living and the dead was staged, produced by Jamaican novelist Lindsay Barrett, with music by the reggae group Rasta Love. Johnson has recalled: "it was fantastic, you know, having written something and having it staged with actors and musicians. That was back in 1973 before I had a poem published anywhere. That was before anyone had ever heard of Linton Kwesi Johnson."

Johnson wrote for New Musical Express, Melody Maker, and Black Music in the 1970s. As a freelancer for Virgin Records, he wrote biographies for their reggae artists, sleeve notes and copy for advertisements.

== Career ==
=== Poetry ===
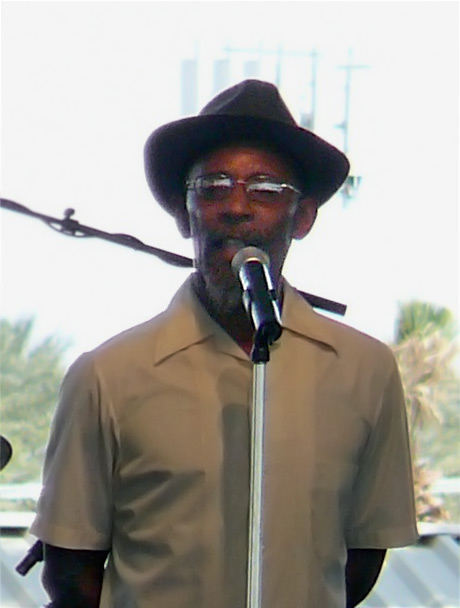
Johnson at Coachella, 2008

Most of Johnson's poetry is political, dealing mainly with the experiences of being an African-Caribbean in Britain: "Writing was a political act and poetry was a cultural weapon...", he told an interviewer in 2008. However, he has also written about other issues, such as British foreign policy and the death of anti-racist marcher Blair Peach. Johnson wrote "Reggae fi Dada" on the death of his father in 1982, blaming social conditions. His most celebrated poems were written during the government of Prime Minister Margaret Thatcher. The poems contain graphic accounts of the racist police brutality occurring at the time (for instance, "Sonny's Lettah"). Johnson's poetry makes clever use of the unstandardised transcription of Jamaican patois.

Johnson's poems first appeared in the journal Race Today, which published his debut collection of poetry, Voices of the Living and the Dead, in 1974. Dread Beat An' Blood, his second collection, was published in 1975 by Bogle-L'Ouverture.

A collection of Johnson's poetry was published in 2002 as Mi Revalueshanary Fren by Penguin Modern Classics, making Johnson one of only three living poets to be published in the series, where his editor was Ellah Allfrey.

=== Essays ===
Johnson's essays, spanning 50 years (1976–2021), are collected in the volume Time Come (Picador, 2023). As described by Colin Grant, "The writing is often flinty and flecked with passion; taut and reasoned, but on the edge of fury. ...the grace and power of LKJ's writing are as necessary as ever." Tomiwa Owolade's review of Time Come in the Sunday Times concludes: "this volume emphasises the fact that Johnson is a dedicated cultural critic rather than simply an activist who happens to write dub poetry."

=== Music ===
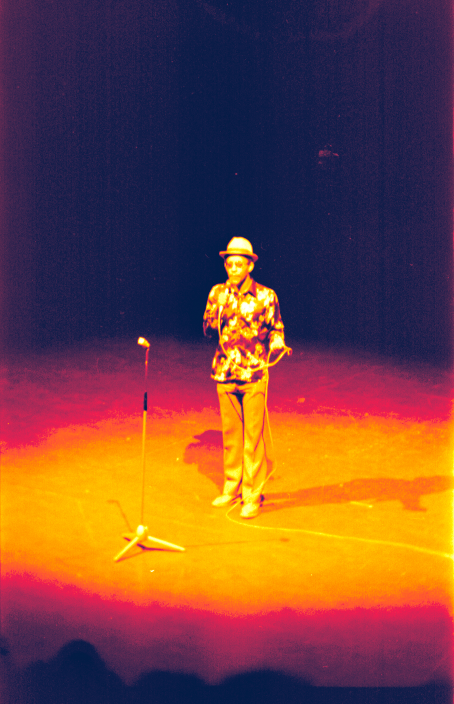
Johnson on stage in Cardiff, 1980

Johnson's best-known albums include his debut Dread Beat an' Blood (1978), Forces of Victory (1979), Bass Culture (1980), LKJ in Dub (1980), and Making History (1983). Across them are spread classics of the dub poetry school of performance – and of reggae itself – such as "Dread Beat An' Blood", "Sonny's Lettah", "Inglan Is A Bitch", "Independent Intavenshan" and "All Wi Doin Is Defendin". His poem "Di Great Insohreckshan" is his response to the 1981 Brixton riots. The work was the subject of a BBC Radio 4 programme in 2007.

Johnson's work, allied to the Jamaican "toasting" tradition, is regarded as an essential precursor of rap.

Johnson's record label LKJ Records, launched in 1981, is home to other reggae artists, some of whom made up the Dub Band, with whom Johnson mostly recorded, and other dub poets, such as Jean "Binta" Breeze. Past releases on the label include recordings by Mikey Smith.

== Awards and honours ==
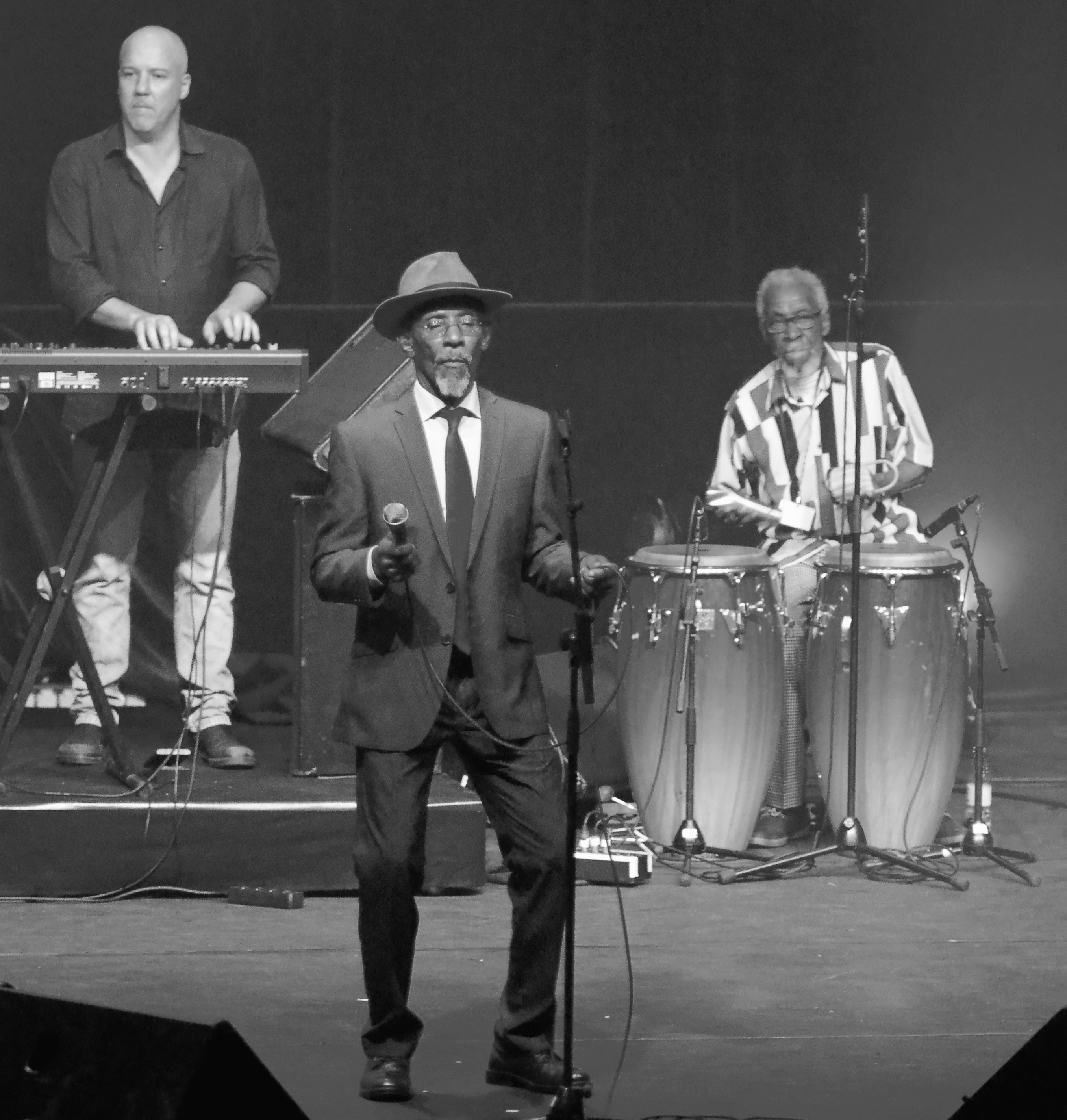
Johnson in concert in Brussels, 2017

Johnson was awarded a C. Day-Lewis Fellowship in 1977, and that year became writer-in-residence for the London Borough of Lambeth. He was appointed an Associate Fellow of Warwick University in 1985 and an Honorary Fellow of Wolverhampton Polytechnic in 1987, and in 1990 received an award at the XIII Premio Internazionale Ultimo Novecento from the city of Pisa for his contribution to poetry and popular music. In 1998, he was awarded the Premio Piero Ciampi Citta di Livorno Concorso Musicale Nazionale in Italy.

In 2003, Johnson was given an honorary fellowship at his alma mater, Goldsmiths College, University of London. In 2004, he became an Honorary Visiting professor of Middlesex University in London. In 2005 he was awarded a silver Musgrave Medal from the Institute of Jamaica for distinguished eminence in the field of poetry. In 2012, he was awarded the Golden PEN Award by English PEN for "a Lifetime's Distinguished Service to Literature". He was elected a Fellow of the Royal Society of Literature in 2013.

He is a Trustee of the George Padmore Institute (GPI), and is a contributor to the GPI's collection of dialogues Changing Britannia: Life Experience With Britain, edited by Roxy Harris and Sarah White (New Beacon Books, 1999).

In August 2014, it was announced that he would receive the Jamaican national honour of the Order of Distinction, Commander Class, in October that year.

On 20 April 2017, he was awarded an Honorary Doctorate of Literature (D.Litt.) by Rhodes University in South Africa.

In July 2020, Johnson was awarded the PEN Pinter Prize – established in Harold Pinter's name to defend freedom of expression and celebrate literature – for his commitment to political expression in his work. Announcing the award, the judges described Johnson as "a living legend", "a poet, reggae icon, academic and campaigner, whose impact on the cultural landscape over the last half century has been colossal and multi-generational.... His political ferocity and his tireless scrutiny of history are truly Pinteresque, as is the humour with which he pursues them." On receiving the award at a live online event hosted by the British Library in October 2020, Johnson named Eritrean poet, poet, songwriter and journalist Amanuel Asrat as the "International Writer of Courage" with whom he would share the prize.

Johnson is chair of 198 Contemporary Arts and Learning, an art gallery and learning institution in Brixton.

== Bibliography ==
- Voices of the Living and the Dead – Creation for Liberation, 1974, ISBN 978-0950349879
- Dread Beat An' Blood – Bogle-L'Ouverture Publications, 1975, ISBN 978-0904521061
- Inglan is a Bitch – Race Today, 1980, ISBN 978-0950349824
- Tings An' Times – Bloodaxe Books, 1991, ISBN 978-1852241681
- Mi Revalueshanary Fren: Selected Poems – Penguin Modern Classics, 2002; 2006, ISBN 978-0141186986
- Time Come: Selected Prose – Picador, 2023, ISBN 9781035006328

== Discography ==
- Dread Beat an' Blood – Virgin, 1978 (as Poet and the Roots)
- Forces of Victory – Island, 1979
- Bass Culture – Island, 1980
- The Best of Linton Kwesi Johnson – Epic, 1980 (compilation)
- LKJ in Dub – Island, 1980
- Making History – Island, 1983
- Reggae Greats – Mango, 1984 (compilation)
- In Concert with the Dub Band – LKJ Records, 1985
- Dub Poetry – Mango, 1985 (compilation)
- Tings an' Times – LKJ Records, 1991
- LKJ in Dub: Volume 2 – LKJ Records, 1992
- LKJ Presents – LKJ Records, 1996
- A Cappella Live – LKJ Records, 1996
- More Time – LKJ Records, 1998
- Independant Intavenshan – Island, 1998 (compilation of the complete Island albums)
- LKJ in Dub: Volume 3 – LKJ Records, 2002
- Straight to Inglan's Head – Universal, 2003 (compilation)
- Live in Paris – Wrasse, 2004
