= Matumbi (band) =

British reggae band

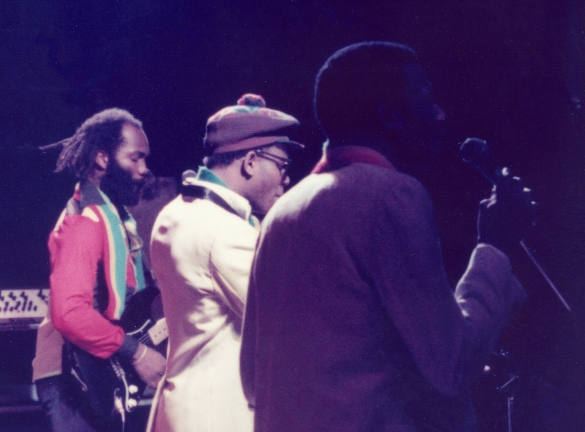
- Matumbi performing in Cardiff, 1978

Background information
- Origin: London, England
- Genres: Reggae rock, Dub music
- Years active: 1971–1982
- Labels: Trojan; Harvest; EMI
- Past members: Tex Dixon; Euton Jones; Dennis Bovell; Errol Pottinger; Eaton "Jah" Blake; Bevin Fagan; Nicholas Bailey; Webster "Webby J" Johnson; Glaister Fagan; Lloyd "Jah Bunny" Donaldson

Matumbi were a British reggae bands active from 1971 to 1982, and are best known as the first successful band of guitarist and record producer Dennis Bovell. The group wrote and performed the opening theme song to Empire Road, a British television series made by the BBC in 1978 and running until 1979. The popularity of the song led to it being released as a single in 1978.

== History ==
Matumbi formed in 1971 in South London, with a line-up of Tex Dixon (vocals), Euton Jones (drums), Dennis Bovell (guitar), Errol Pottinger (guitar), Eaton "Jah" Blake (bass guitar), Bevin Fagan (vocals), and Nicholas Bailey (vocals, later better known as Nick Straker). In the early 1970s, they acted as a backing band to touring Jamaican musicians. In 1973, they opened for The Wailers at the Ethiopian famine relief concert in Edmonton, where much to their embarrassment they went down better than the headliners, Bovell later saying: "The press thought we were much better, and we felt terrible because they were our heroes." Matumbi signed to Trojan Records, and had a major breakthrough in 1976, when their version of Bob Dylan's "Man in Me" became the biggest-selling UK reggae single that year.

Success brought problems for the band, with their record label unhappy about some band members' other musical activities, and Bailey and Dixon left, to be replaced by Webster Johnson (keyboards). Pottinger and Jones also left the band, with Glaister Fagan and Lloyd "Jah Bunny" Donaldson joining. The new line-up signed a deal with Harvest Records, and toured with Ian Dury and the Blockheads. Matumbi recorded two sessions for John Peel's BBC Radio 1 show in 1978. In the same year, they also recorded the theme song for the television series, Empire Road.

The group's debut album, Seven Seals, was issued in 1978, but their second album, Point of View, was a greater success, with the title track giving the band a top 40 hit in 1979. Further albums followed between 1980 and 1982, but these did not match their earlier success. Their last album, Testify, was recorded in Jamaica co-produced by Bevin Fagan and drummer Euton Jones. The band split up, with members moving on to various other projects; Bovell released solo material and became renowned as a producer, Donaldson joined The Cimarons, and Fagan and Blake recorded as The Squad. Fagan died of a heart attack in 2008, aged 54.

== Discography ==
=== Albums ===
- Seven Seals (1978), Harvest SHSP 4090
- Point of View (1979), EMI
- Dub Planet Orbit 1 (1980), Extinguish
- Matumbi (1981), EMI
- Testify (1982), Solid Groove

Compilations

- The Best of Matumbi (1977), Trojan
- Empire Road - the best of Matumbi (2001), EMI
- Music in the Air (2005), Trojan

=== Singles ===
- "Brother Louie" (1973), Trojan
- "Wipe Them Out" (1973), Trojan
- "After Tonight" (1976), Trojan
- "Man In Me" (1977), Trojan
- "Rock" (June 1978), Harvest HAR 5162
- "Empire Road" (September 1978), Harvest HAR 5169
- "Bluebeat & Ska" (March 1979), Harvest HAR 5174
- "Point of View (Squeeze a Little Lovin')" (August 1979), Harvest - UK No. 35
- "Alive & Kicking" (1983)
