= Dub poetry =

Form of performance poetry

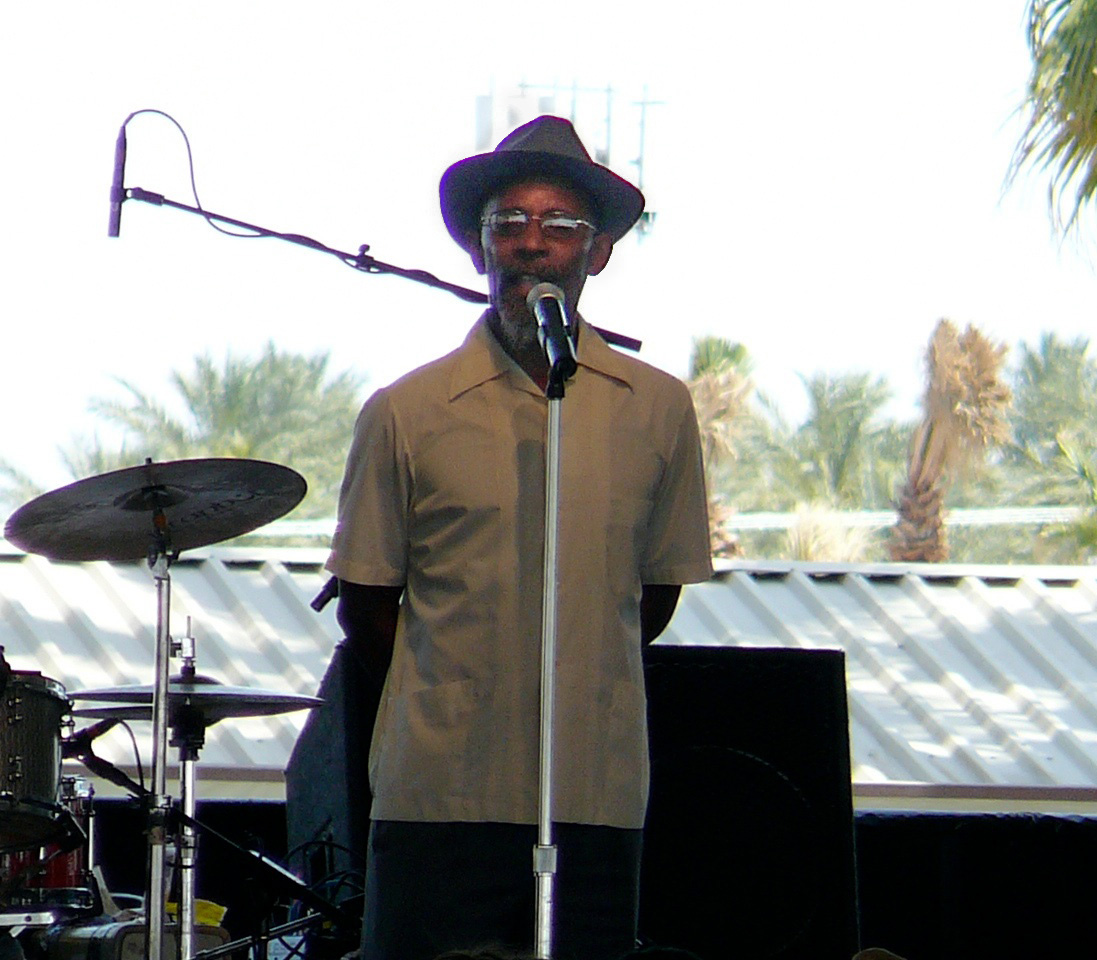
- Linton Kwesi Johnson performing in 2008
- Stylistic origins: Dub - spoken word
- Cultural origins: 1970s, Jamaica

Dub poetry is a form of performance poetry of Jamaican origin, which evolved out of dub music in Kingston, Jamaica, in the 1970s, as well as in London, England, and Toronto, Canada, cities which have large populations of Caribbean immigrants. The term "Dub Poetry" was coined by Dub artist Linton Kwesi Johnson in 1976, and further popularized by artist Oku Onoura, which consists of spoken word over reggae rhythms, originally found on the backing or "version" side of a twelve- or seven-inch vinyl record.

Unlike deejaying (also known as toasting), which also features the use of the spoken word, the dub poet's performance is normally prepared, rather than the extemporized chat of the dancehall dee jay. In musical setting, the dub poet usually appears on stage with a band performing music specifically written to accompany each poem, rather than simply performing over the top of dub plates, or riddims, in the dancehall fashion. Musicality is built into dub poems, yet dub poets generally perform without backing music, delivering chanted speech with pronounced rhythmic accentuation and dramatic stylization of gesture. Sometimes dub music effects such as echo and reverb are dubbed spontaneously by a poet into live versions of a poem. Many dub poets also employ call-and-response devices to engage audiences.

== Political nature ==
Dub poetry has been a vehicle for political and social commentary, with none of the braggadocio often associated with the dancehall. The odd love-song or elegy appears, but dub poetry is predominantly concerned with politics and social justice, commonly voiced through a commentary on current events (thus sharing these elements with dancehall and "conscious" or "roots" reggae music).

== Notable albums ==
Dub poetry has established itself as a major form of black popular art and its breakthrough was made through Linton Kwesi Johnson's (LKJ)'s seminal album Dread Beat an' Blood, which was released in the UK in 1978. Oku Onuora's Reflection In Red in 1979 was the first Jamaican recording of a dub poem, followed by Lillian Allen's Revolutionary Tea Party and Benjamin Zephaniah's Rasta, both produced in 1983, and many others from the early 1980s onwards such as Anti Social Workers 'Positive Style' produced by leading dub producer The Mad Professor on Ariwa Records.

== Toronto ==
Toronto, Ontario, Canada, has the second-highest concentration of dub poets, preceded by Jamaica and followed by England. Lillian Allen, Afua Cooper, and Ahdri Zhina Mandiela are among the founding mothers of the Canadian dub-poetry legacy. The Dub Poets Collective, established in Toronto in 2003, organized a total of five dub-poetry festivals, three national and two international, between the years of 2004 and 2010.

== United Kingdom ==
LKJ still runs LKJ Records in the UK, a label that publishes both his own books and music, and that of other musicians and poets.

Benjamin Zephaniah continued to publish in the UK. He wrote novels as well as poetry. He was put forward for the post of Oxford Professor of Poetry in 1989 and British Poet Laureate in 1999, and in 2003 was also offered an OBE, which he declined.

Many dub poets have published their work as volumes of written poetry as well as albums of poetry with music.

== See also ==
- Performance poetry
- Caribbean poetry
- Postcolonial literature
- Poetry slam
- Poetry reading
