= Dennis Bovell =

Barbadian-British reggae musician (born 1953)

Dennis Bovell MBE
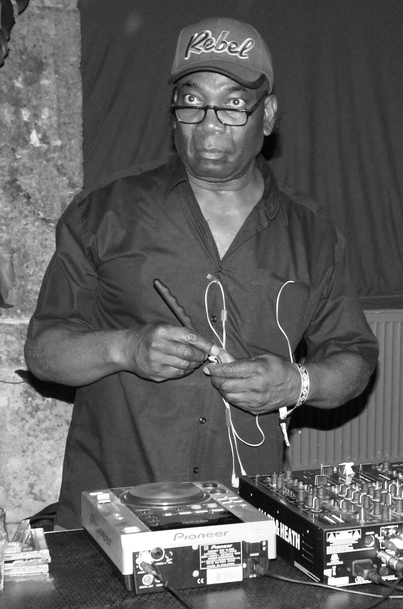
- Bovell performing live in 2015

Background information
- Also known as: Blackbeard
- Born: 22 May 1953 (age 73); Saint Peter, Barbados, West Indies
- Genres: Dub, lovers rock, reggae, post-punk
- Occupations: Musician, record producer
- Instruments: Bass, guitar
- Years active: 1968–present
- Label: LKJ Records

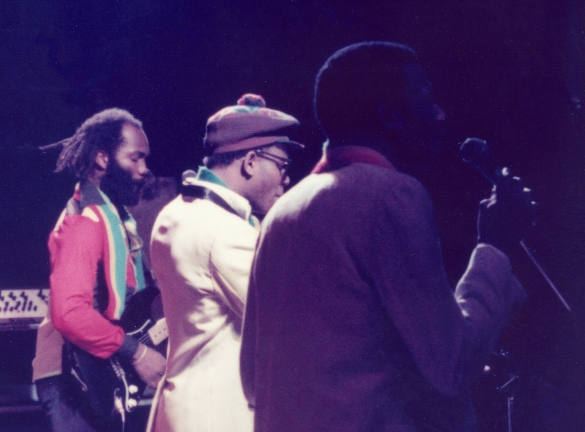
Bovell (left) playing with Matumbi, Cardiff, 1978

Dennis Bovell MBE (born 22 May 1953) is a Barbados-born reggae guitarist, bass player and record producer, based in the United Kingdom. He was a member of a progressive rock group called Stonehenge, who later changed name and became the British reggae band Matumbi, and released dub-reggae records under his own name as well as the pseudonym Blackbeard. He is most widely known for his decades-spanning collaborations with Linton Kwesi Johnson.

== Biography ==
Born in Saint Peter, Barbados, in 1953, Bovell moved to South London in 1965 and became immersed in Jamaican culture, particularly dub music, setting up his own Jah Sufferer sound system. Running the sound system brought trouble from the police and Bovell was imprisoned for six months on remand, but was later released on appeal. Bovell was friends at school with future rock musicians including keyboardist Nick Straker and record producer Tony Mansfield, both of whom later worked with Bovell. He was a member of a progressive rock group called Stonehenge, who later changed name and became the British reggae band Matumbi. He formed Matumbi in the mid-1970s.

Bovell also worked as an engineer at Dip Records, the precursor to the Lovers Rock label, and he was a key figure in the early days of the lovers rock genre. He experimented with combining disco rhythms and reggae, most notably on Janet Kay's hit single "Silly Games". According to Bovell, he wrote the song with the intention of producing a hit. Bovell later recalled that the song's commercial success discouraged him from reusing its distinctive drum pattern, believing that another recording using it would have limited commercial appeal and would be poorly received by reggae audiences.

He has produced albums by a wide variety of artists including Creation Rebel, I-Roy, the Thompson Twins, Sharon Shannon, Alpha Blondy, Bananarama, the Pop Group, Fela Kuti, the Slits, Orange Juice and Madness. He has collaborated with poet, Linton Kwesi Johnson for much of his working life.

Bovell also co-wrote and co-produced the majority of material by British reggae singer Bobby Kray.

In 1980, he wrote the score for Franco Rosso's film Babylon. Bovell has also written music for the 1983 television drama The Boy Who Won the Pools and Global Revolution (2006).

In the BBC's Reggae Britannia, Bovell related a tale of strange goings on in the leafy London suburb of Barnes, where the John Hassell Recordings studio was based in a residential house, in a quiet street at 21 Nassau Road. John Hassell, aided by his wife Felicity, cut reggae dubplates with such finesse and understanding that the studio's output was to feed sound systems throughout the UK.

In 2012, Bovell produced the album Mek It Run.

In 2013 he collaborated with dub producer / musician Gaudi, playing bass on his track "I Start To Pray" featuring Lee "Scratch" Perry and The Orb, included on Gaudi album In Between Times Six Degrees Records.

In Steve McQueen's 2020 film Lovers Rock, the second in his five-part anthology series Small Axe, Bovell has a cameo role and his song "Silly Games" is prominently featured.

Bovell was appointed Member of the Order of the British Empire (MBE) in the 2021 Birthday Honours for services to music.

== Discography ==
- Strictly Dub Wize (1978), Tempus – as Blackbeard
- I Wah Dub (1980), More Cut/EMI – as Blackbeard
- Dub Conference (Winston Edwards & Blackbeard at 10 Downing Street) (1980), Studio 16 – with Winston Edwards
- Brain Damage (1981), Fontana
- Audio Active (1986), Moving Target – as Dennis Bovell and the Dub Band
- Dub Dem Silly (1993), Arawak
- Tactics (1994), LKJ
- Dub of Ages (2003), LKJ
- All Over the World (2006)
- Dub Dem Silly Volume 2 (2006), Arawak – Dennis Bovell featuring Janet Kay
- Corean Jamaican Connection, Powerslave – Yoonkee meets Dennis Bovell
- Dub Outside (2011), Double Six – Steve Mason & Dennis Bovell
- Mek It Run (2012), Pressure Sounds
- Dub 4 Daze (2015), Glitterbeat Records

=== Compilations ===
- Dub Master (1993), Jamaican Gold
- Decibel: More Cuts and Dubs 1976–1983 (2003), Pressure Sounds
- The Dubmaster (2022), Trojan Records
- Sufferer Sounds (2024), Disciples
