= Queen Mary Wasafiri New Writing Prize =

Annual literary award

The Queen Mary Wasafiri New Writing Prize
- Awarded for: For writers who have not yet published a complete book
- Country: United Kingdom
- Presented by: Wasafiri magazine
- First award: 2009; 17 years ago
- Website: www.wasafiri.org/new-writing-prize/

The Queen Mary Wasafiri New Writing Prize (originally known as the Wasafiri New Writing Prize) is an annual award open to anyone worldwide who has not yet published a complete book. It was inaugurated in 2009 to celebrate the 25th anniversary of Wasafiri magazine, to support new writers, with no limits on age, gender, nationality or background. The prize is judged in three categories: Fiction, Poetry, and Life Writing; The winners are published in the print and online magazine.

== Award history ==
=== 2009 ===
The 2009 judges were: Susheila Nasta (Chair), Margaret Busby, Mimi Khalvati and Blake Morrison. The winners were announced by Mimi Khalvati on 31 October at the Purcell Room, Southbank Centre, London, with the winning entries subsequently published in Wasafiri 61, Spring 2010.

Winners

- Fiction: Ola Awonubi for "The Go Slow Journey"
- Poetry: Rowyda Amin for "Monkey Daughter"
- Life Writing: Bart Moore-Gilbert for "Prologue"

=== 2010 ===
The 2010 judges were Susheila Nasta (Chair), Moniza Alvi, Romesh Gunesekera and Marina Warner. The winners were announced on October 14 at Somerset House, London, and the winning entries were published in Wasafiri 65, Spring 2011.

Winners

- Fiction: Jackie McCarrick for "The Visit"
- Fiction: Jane Ryan for "Minding Romiya"
- Poetry: Noel Williams for "The Anthropology of Loss"
- Life Writing: Barbara Jenkins for "It's Cherry Pink and Apple Blossom White"

=== 2011 ===
The 2011 judges were: Susheila Nasta (Chair), Brian Chikwava, Jackie Kay and Daljit Nagra. The winners were announced by Brian Chikwava at Bush House, London, and the winning entries were published in Wasafiri 69, Spring 2012.

Winners

- Fiction: Michael Marett-Crosby for "Room 618"
- Poetry: Richard Scott for "Adin"
- Life Writing: Abeer Hoque for "On Growing"

=== 2012 ===
The 2012 judges were: Susheila Nasta MBE (Chair), John Haynes, Maya Jaggi, Colin Grant. The winners were announced at Asia House on Wednesday 3 October.

Winners

- Fiction: C. S. Mee for "The Walk"
- Poetry: Sally St Clair for "In the Beginning and the End"
- Life Writing: David Houston for "Wish You Were Here"

=== 2013 ===
The 2013 judges were Susheila Nasta MBE (Chair), Anthony Joseph, Tabish Khair and Beverley Naidoo. The winning entries were published in Issue 77 of Wasafiri in February 2014.

Winners

- Fiction: Gita Ralleigh for "Back at the Museum"
- Life Writing: Cliff Chen for "Life Exchanges"
- Poetry: Anita Pati for "A Concise Chinese-English Dictionary for Stealing Love"

=== 2014 ===
The 2014 judges were Susheila Nasta (Chair), Bidisha, Inua Ellams, Monique Roffey. The winning entries were published in the Spring 2015 issue of Wasafiri.

Winners

- Fiction: Simon van der Velde (UK) for "The Bearer"
- Poetry: Pnina Shinebourne (UK) for "Dot by dot of hurt"; Aria Aber (UK) for "First Generation Immigrant Child"
- Life Writing: Aurvi Sharma (USA) for "Seeing Double"

=== 2015 ===
The 2015 judges were Susheila Nasta (Chair), Toby Litt, Yasmin Alibhai Brown and Roger Robinson.

Winners

- Fiction: Uschi Gatward for "My Brother is Back"
- Poetry: Amaal Said for "The Girl Grew"
- Life Writing: Louise Kennedy for "A Suitable Family"

Special commendations: Akwaeke Emezi for "Welcome"; Richard Georges for "Bush Tea"; Sarala Estruch for "Saturdays"

=== 2016 ===
The 2016 judges were Susheila Nasta (Chair), Diran Adebayo, Imtiaz Dharker and Vesna Goldsworthy. The winners were published in Wasafiri 89 (Spring 2017).

Winners

- Fiction: Niamh MacCabe for "Nobody Knows the Shivering Stars"
- Poetry: Danielle Boodoo-Fortuné for "Portrait of my father as a grouper"
- Life Writing: Shiva Rahbaran for "Massoumeh: An Iranian Family in Times of Revolution"

Special commendations: H. M. Aziz for "The Cheekovit" (Fiction); Zillah Bowes for "Dogs who like fish" (Poetry); Cheryl Anderson for "Round Yard" (Life Writing)

=== 2017 ===
The 2017 judges were Susheila Nasta (Chair), Sabrina Mahfouz, Andrea Stuart and Boyd Tonkin. The winners were announced on 19 October at The People's Palace, Queen Mary University of London.

Winners

- Fiction: Ndinda Kioko for "Some Freedom Dreams"
- Poetry: Mehran Waheed for "Petit Navire"
- Life Writing: Julie Abrams-Humphries for "Crinoline Lady"

Special commendations: "Seven Hells" by Zaid Hassan (Fiction); "What Yung Thug's Colour Theory Best Describes As An Open Wound Or Open Letter" by Momtaza Mehri (Poetry); "Bentong! Go Back to Bentong!" by Aliyah Kim Keshani (Life Writing)

=== 2018 ===
The 2018 judges were Susheila Nasta (Chair), Elleke Boehmer, Malika Booker and Kerry Young. The winners were announced on 25 October at The Blenheim Saloon, Marlborough House.

Winners

- Fiction: Deidre Shanahan for "Plunder"
- Poetry: Daniella Shokoohi for "In the Garden Where the Gorgons Live"
- Life Writing: Len Lukowski for "Diary of a Teenage Boy"

Special commendations: "The Other Things in the Blood" by IfeOluwa Nihinlola (Fiction); "Babes in the Wood" by Maeve Henry (Poetry); "Feeding Grief to Animals" by Rebecca Parfitt (Life Writing)

=== 2019 ===
The 2019 judges were Susheila Nasta (Chair), Louise Doughty (Fiction), Warsan Shire (Poetry) and Nikesh Shukla (Life Writing).

Winners

- Fiction: Alicia Mietus for "Third Person Female"
- Poetry: Desirée Seebaran for "Picong"
- Life Writing: Ruby D. Jones for "Natural Causes"

Special commendations: Erica Sugi Anayadike, "How to Marry an African President" (Fiction); Joanna Johnson, "Pantoum of Soldiers" (Poetry); E. S. Batchelor, "Human Resources" (Life Writing)

=== 2020 ===
The 2020 judges were Simon Prosser (Fiction), Raymond Antrobus (Poetry) and Aida Edemariam (Life Writing), chaired by Kadija Sesay.

Winners

- Fiction: Sharma Taylor (Barbados) for "How You Make Jamaican Coconut Oil"
- Poetry: Yasmine Seale (Turkey) for "Conventional Wisdom"
- Life Writing: Sharanya Deepak (India) for "Seamless"

Special commendations: Adam Zmith for "Holding on" (Fiction); Emily Pritchard for "Cutting water" (Poetry); Minifreda Grovetszki for "When you think I'm hurrying you but you're taking an eternity over every damn thing" (Life Writing)

=== 2021 ===
The 2021 judges were Hirsh Sawhney (Fiction), Christie Watson (Life Writing), Tishani Doshi (Poetry), and Andrew Cowan (Chair).

Winners

- Fiction: Kate Carne (UK) for "First to Go"
- Poetry: Dipanjali Roy (India) for "सफ़रनामा / Safarnama"
- Life Writing: Anne O'Brien (Ireland) for "Swallow"

=== 2022 ===
The 2022 judges were Marina Salandy-Brown (Chair), Preti Taneja (Fiction), Mary Jean Chan (Poetry), and Francesca Wade (Life Writing).

Winners

- Fiction: Sylee Gore (Germany) for "Cloud Archive"
- Poetry: Hasti (UK) for "I have fallen from my dream of progress"
- Life Writing: Nadine Monem (UK) for "Salt Prints"

=== 2023 ===
The 2023 judges were Diana Evans (Chair), Leila Aboulela (Fiction), Caleb Femi (Poetry), and Aanchal Malhotra (Life Writing), who praised the "urgent topical weight, maturity, and technical skill" of the winners and shortlistees, announced in October 2023.

Winners

- Fiction: Sharika Nair for "That Which We Call A Rose"
- Poetry: Swati Rana for "Mother, Earth—A Colloquy"
- Life Writing: Nasia Sarwar-Skuse for "Absent Presence"

=== 2024 ===
The 2024 judges of the prize were Margaret Busby (Chair), Isabel Waidner (Fiction), Cristina Rivera Garza (Life Writing), and Meena Kandasamy (Poetry). The winners were announced on 23 October as:

Winners

- Fiction: Thảo Tô for "Love in the Time of Migration"
- Life Writing: Joey Garcia for "A Public Space"
- Poetry: Nasim Łuczaj for "the village"
