= Wasafiri =

British literary magazine (founded 1984

- Issue 93: Spring 2018
- Discipline: International contemporary writing
- Language: English
- Edited by: Susheila Nasta (founder); Sana Goyal

Publication details
- History: 1984–present
- Publisher: Routledge of behalf of Wasafiri (United Kingdom)
- Frequency: Quarterly

Standard abbreviations
- ISO 4: Wasafiri

Indexing
- ISSN: 0269-0055 (print); 1747-1508 (web)
- LCCN: sn86023450
- OCLC no.: 67618880

Links
- Journal homepage; Online archive

Wasafiri is a quarterly British literary magazine covering international contemporary writing. Founded in 1984, the magazine derives its name from a Swahili word meaning "travellers" that is etymologically linked with the Arabic word "safari". The magazine holds that many of those who created the literatures in which it is particularly interested "...have all in some sense been cultural travellers either through migration, transportation or else, in the more metaphorical sense of seeking an imagined cultural 'home'." Funded by the Arts Council England, Wasafiri is "a journal of post-colonial literature that pays attention to the wealth of Black and diasporic writers worldwide. It is Britain's only international magazine for Black British, African, Asian and Caribbean literatures."

== History ==
Wasafiri magazine was established in 1984 by Susheila Nasta, who served as its editor-in-chief for 35 years. The magazine was originally developed to extend the activities of the Association for the Teaching of Caribbean, African, Asian and Associated Literatures (ATCAL), which was inaugurated in 1979. ATCAL campaigned for greater diversification of the "English literature" traditionally taught in UK schools at that time, and sought to get writers such as Derek Walcott, Jean Rhys and V. S. Naipaul included on the A-level syllabus. Once that process was under way, Wasafiri was created, becoming "a literary space for people to talk to each other" and opening up literary studies to a wider body of literature in English beyond the established canon.

The magazine contributed towards writers such as Abdulrazak Gurnah, Buchi Emecheta and Vikram Seth becoming established. As noted by a reviewer of the 20th-anniversary issue, "Writing Across Worlds": "Since its foundation...the literary magazine Wasafiri has focused on the idea of the writer as someone who transports the imagination beyond the maps of narrowly defined borders, and has promoted a range of new and established voices as well as signposting new waves in contemporary literature worldwide." On its 25th anniversary, Wasafiri was described by BBC Radio 4's Woman's Hour as having "provided a platform for hundreds of writers struggling to be heard at the outset of their writing careers, many of whom have since gone on to become world-renowned, award winners."

The magazine frequently produces themed editions — for example, the Summer 2008 Indian edition, about which Neha Kirpal, an Indian social entrepreneur, wrote: "The magazine critiques the work of various authors in a very in-depth manner, complete with detailed notes and useful references. It contains certainly not light-hearted writing; on the contrary, intense – almost equivalent to writing a research paper or academic essay. Wasafiri can safely serve as constructive material for any literature enthusiast or even as a ready reckoner for the budding writer. A collection that can be savoured by every book lover, Wasafiri is vital for all literature students, teachers, writers, critics, authors and poets and simply anyone who enjoys fiction." Over the years, special editions have had a range of notable guest editors, such as Bernardine Evaristo for the 2009 issue "Black Britain: Beyond Definition", and Billy Kahora and Zoe Norridge for the 2020 issue on "Human Rights Cultures".

Many of the short stories published in the magazine have gone on to win literary prizes, including the Caine Prize for African Writing.

Founding editor Susheila Nasta was followed after 35 years in the role by Malachi McIntosh and then Emily Mercer, and the current editor and publishing director of Wasafiri, as of 2024, is Sana Goyal.

== New Writing Prize ==
An annual Wasafiri New Writing Prize (now known as the Queen Mary Wasafiri New Writing Prize), open to anyone worldwide who has not yet published a complete book, was inaugurated in 2009 to celebrate the magazine's 25th anniversary. The prize is judged in three categories: Fiction, Poetry, and Life Writing. Judges of the prize have included over the years: Aanchal Malhotra, Aida Edemariam, Andrea Stuart, Andrew Cowan, Anthony Joseph, Beverley Naidoo, Bidisha, Blake Morrison, Boyd Tonkin, Brian Chikwava, Caleb Femi, Christie Watson, Colin Grant, Daljit Nagra, Diana Evans, Diran Adebayo, Elleke Boehmer, Hirsh Sawhney, Imtiaz Dharker, Inua Ellams, Jackie Kay, John Haynes, Kerry Young, Leila Aboulela, Louise Doughty, Malika Booker, Margaret Busby, Marina Warner, Maya Jaggi, Mimi Khalvati, Monique Roffey, Moniza Alvi, Nikesh Shukla, Raymond Antrobus, Roger Robinson, Romesh Gunesekera, Sabrina Mahfouz, Simon Prosser, Tabish Khair, Tishani Doshi, Toby Litt, Vesna Goldsworthy, Warsan Shire, Yasmin Alibhai Brown, as well as Susheila Nasta.

== 35th-anniversary anthology ==
Wasafiri's 35th anniversary was marked by the publication of the anthology Brave New Words: The Power of Writing Now (Myriad Editions, 2019), edited by Susheila Nasta. A collection of specially commissioned essays "exploring the place of the writer, past and present, the value of critical thinking and the power of the written word", it includes contributions by Bernardine Evaristo, Githa Hariharan, Eva Hoffman, Romesh Gunesekera, James Kelman, Tabish Khair, Kei Miller, Blake Morrison, Mukoma wa Ngugi, Hsiao-Hung Pai, Olumide Popoola, Shivanee Ramlochan, Bina Shah, Raja Shehadeh and Marina Warner.
