= Maya Jaggi =

British writer and journalist

Maya Jaggi FRSL
- Born: London, England
- Education: University of Oxford; London School of Economics
- Occupations: Writer, broadcaster, literary critic and editor
- Relatives: Madhur Jaffrey (aunt)
- Awards: National Newspaper Writer of the Year, RIMA (1996; 1998); Feature writer of the year, EMMA Awards (1998; 1999); Honorary doctorate, Open University (2012)

Maya Jaggi FRSL is a British writer, literary critic, editor and cultural journalist. In the words of the Open University, from which Jaggi received an honorary doctorate in 2012, she "has had a transformative influence in the last 25 years in extending the map of international writing today". In 2023, Jaggi was elected Fellow of the Royal Society of Literature.

Jaggi has been a contributor to a wide range of publications including The Guardian, Financial Times, The Independent, The Literary Review, The Times Literary Supplement, The New York Review of Books, The Wall Street Journal, The Economist, New Statesman, Wasafiri, Index on Censorship, and Newsweek, and is particularly known for her profiles of writers, artists, film-makers, musicians and others. She is also a broadcaster and presenter on radio and television. Jaggi is the niece of actor and food writer Madhur Jaffrey.

== Life and career ==
Born in London, UK, where her parents settled in 1960 after migrating from India, Maya Jaggi was educated at Oxford University and the London School of Economics.

Her first job, in the 1980s, was as Literary Editor of the journal Third World Quarterly, where she "created a literature section that embraced Latin America as part of the global South", commissioning and publishing work by and about major writers. In the late 1990s, she joined the staff of The Guardian, working on the foreign news desk while also writing for the paper's cultural pages.

Since 2000, Jaggi has built a freelance career reporting on arts and culture from five continents and has earned acclaim for her long-form arts profiles, written particularly for the Guardian Review up until 2015. In addition, she has contributed articles and reviews to a wide range of publications, among them The Financial Times, The Independent, The Economist, The Times Literary Supplement, The Observer, The Sunday Times, the Daily Telegraph, Index on Censorship, the Literary Review, the Evening Standard, Newsweek, the Wall Street Journal, New York Review of Books, New Statesman, Bookforum, Wasafiri magazine and Words Without Borders.

In September 2004, she was one of 50 Black and Asian writers celebrated for their contribution to the canon of contemporary British literature in a photograph at the British Library entitled "A Great Day".

She has received various awards over the years and in 2012 her work was recognised with an honorary doctorate from the Open University, the citation noting that Jaggi "occupies a unique place in British journalism, and has had a transformative influence in the last 25 years in extending the map of international writing today."

In 2014, she was a DAAD Arts and Media fellow in Berlin. She has also been an EU Senior Expert in Cultural Journalism in post-Soviet Europe.

In 2022, Jaggi was Writer in Residence at the Writer's House of Georgia in Tbilisi, and in 2023 she was elected a Fellow of the Royal Society of Literature.

=== Literary profiles ===
She has interviewed a dozen Nobel Prize-winners for literature, including Gunter Grass, Mario Vargas Llosa, Jose Saramago, Toni Morrison, Derek Walcott, V. S. Naipaul, Kenzaburō Ōe, and Orhan Pamuk (before he won the prize), as well as other celebrated authors and scholars including Chinua Achebe, Umberto Eco, Tom Stoppard, W. G. Sebald, James Kelman, Alice Walker, Nuruddin Farah, Mahmoud Darwish, Hanan al-Shaykh, Elias Khoury, Alaa al-Aswany, Tahar Ben Jelloun, Amin Maalouf, Isabel Allende, Henry Louis Gates Jr, Eric Hobsbawm, George Steiner, Jeanette Winterson, Caryl Phillips, Kazuo Ishiguro, Arundhati Roy, Walter Mosley, Terry McMillan, Amy Tan, Linton Kwesi Johnson, Aminatta Forna, Nadeem Aslam, Romesh Gunesekera, Junot Díaz and Edward Said (the latter praising her profile of him as "in a class of its own"), and practitioners of diverse art forms, such as filmmaker Costa Gavras, musician Abdullah Ibrahim, painter Frank Bowling, dancer Carlos Acosta, and Oprah Winfrey.

Several of Jaggi's literary profiles have appeared in such collections as Lives and Works (2002), Writing Across Worlds: Contemporary Writers Talk (ed. Susheila Nasta, 2004) and Women of the Revolution: Forty Years of Feminism (ed. Kira Cochrane, 2010). The 2001 Penguin Modern Classics edition of Chinua Achebe's Anthills of the Savannah has an introduction by Jaggi.

=== Broadcasting ===
Her work as a broadcaster encompasses contributions to such BBC radio programmes as The Strand, Front Row, Night Waves, Off the Page, Any Questions? and The World Tonight, and she was writer-presenter of the television documentary Isabel Allende: The Art of Reinvention (BBC Four, 2003). In 2009, Jaggi's interview with cultural theorist Stuart Hall was the subject of a 258-minute film by Mike Dibb entitled Personally Speaking: A Long Conversation with Stuart Hall.

=== Other cultural activity ===
Jaggi has served as an adviser to the London Arts Board and the British Council, an executive member of English PEN and as a judge for numerous literary awards: the Orange Prize, the David Cohen Prize, the Commonwealth Writers' Prize, the Guardian Fiction Prize, the Saif Ghobash–Banipal Prize for Arabic Literary Translation, the Amnesty International UK Media Awards, the Harvill Secker Young Translators' Prize, the Warwick Prize for Writing, the Wasafiri New Writing Prize, the Man Asian Literary Prize, the Caine Prize for African Writing, the International Dublin Literary Award, the OCM Bocas Prize for Caribbean Literature, and others.

She participates regularly in literary festivals, presents seminars and live events, and is a board member of Wasafiri magazine and a patron of the SI Leeds Literary Prize. She is also a member of the Folio Prize Academy.

In April 2016, she was Artistic Director of the project "Where Europe Meets Asia: Georgia 25", a cultural week marking the 25 years since Georgia gained independence from the Soviet Union. Talks, films and other events took place in London at Asia House and elsewhere, with participants including Boris Akunin, Boyd Tonkin, Donald Rayfield, Aka Morchiladze, Dato Turashvili, Zurab Karumidze, Claire Armitstead, Maureen Freely, and others.

Jaggi has chaired the judging panel of the EBRD Literature Prize (2024 and 2025), and she serves as critic-at-large for Words Without Borders.

== Awards and recognition ==
- 1996: National Newspaper Writer of the Year, Race in the Media Awards (RIMA).
- 1998: National Newspaper Writer of the Year, Race in the Media Awards.
- 1998: Feature writer of the year, EMMA awards, Ethnic Multicultural Media Academy.
- 1999: Feature writer of the year, EMMA awards, Ethnic Multicultural Media Academy.
- 2001: National News – body of work, RIMA, shortlisted
- 2003: Orwell Prize shortlist
- 2012: Honorary degree of Doctor of the University, Open University, for her "outstanding contribution to education and culture".
- 2023: Elected Fellow of the Royal Society of Literature
