= Merle Collins =

Grenadian writer (born 1950)

- Born: 29 September 1950; Aruba
- Education: London School of Economics, Georgetown University
- Occupations: Poet, performing artist, novelist, writer, prosaist, artist, university teacher
- Employer: University of North London
- Awards: Guggenheim Fellowship (2003)

Merle Collins (born 29 September 1950 in Aruba) is a Grenadian poet, novelist and short-story writer.

== Life ==
Collins' parents are from Grenada, where they returned from Aruba shortly after her birth. Her primary education was in St George's, Grenada. She later studied at the University of the West Indies in Mona, Jamaica, earning degrees in English and Spanish in 1972. She then taught history and Spanish in Grenada for two years and subsequently in St Lucia. In 1980, she graduated from Georgetown University, Washington, DC, with a master's degree in Latin American Studies. She graduated from the London School of Economics with a Ph.D. in Government.

Collins was deeply involved in the Grenadian Revolution and served as a government coordinator for research on Latin America and the Caribbean. She left Grenada for England in 1983.

== Academic work ==
From 1984 to 1995, Collins taught at the University of North London. She is currently a Professor of Comparative Literature and English at the University of Maryland, where she was selected as 2018–2019 Distinguished Scholar Teacher.

Her critical works include "Themes and Trends in Caribbean Writing Today" in From My Guy to Sci-Fi: Genre and Women's Writing in the Postmodern World (ed. Helen Carr, Pandora Press, 1989), and "To be Free is Very Sweet" in Slavery and Abolition (Vol. 15, issue 3, 1994, pp. 96–103).

== Creative writing ==
Collins' first collection of poetry, Because the Dawn Breaks, was published by Karia Press in London in 1985, at which time Collins was a member of African Dawn, a performance group combining poetry, mime, and African music. In England, she began her first novel, Angel, which was published in 1987. Angel follows the lives of Grenadians as they struggled for independence, and is specifically about a young woman going through the political turbulence in Grenada at the time. Her collection of short stories, Rain Darling, was produced in 1990, and a second collection of poetry, Rotten Pomerack, in 1992. The poems in this collection explore experiences of Caribbean immigrants in England.

Collins' second novel, The Colour of Forgetting, was published in 1995. A review of her 2003 poetry collection, Lady in a Boat, states: "Ranging from poems reveling in the nation language of her island to poems that capture the beauty of its flora, Collins presents her island and people going about the business of living. They attempt to come to terms with the past and construct a future emerging out of the crucible of violence. Lady in a Boat is a poignant retelling of a period in history when, for a brief moment, Caribbean ascendancy seemed possible. Merle Collins shows how the death of this moment continues to haunt the Caribbean imagination." Her most recent collection of stories, The Ladies Are Upstairs, was published in 2011.

Her 2023 novel, Ocean Stirrings (subtitled "A Work of Fiction in Tribute to Louise Langdon Norton Little, Working Mother and Activist, Mother of Malcolm X and Seven Siblings"), was shortlisted for the 2024 Orwell Prize for Political Fiction. Alexandra Harris, chair of the judges, stated: "Collins fuses history and invention with utmost care and creativity. ... With a deep sense of purpose and not a hint of literary showiness, Collins brings together many voices, from eighteenth-century English letter-writers to Black rights orators, and she honours the rich Grenadian creole, now largely lost, with a new life here on the page." The review by Shivanee Ramlochan in Caribbean Beat concluded: "Above all, this is a richly empathetic rendering in fiction of a real-life person whose story remained almost entirely unsung. Ocean Stirrings anchors her history before us, asking whose voices are allowed to resound."

== Bibliography ==
=== Poetry ===
- —— (1985). Because the Dawn Breaks. Karia Press. ISBN 9780946918096.
- —— (1992). Rotten Pomerack. Virago Press. ISBN 9781853815560.
- —— (2003). Lady in a Boat. Peepal Tree Press. ISBN 9781900715850.

=== Novels ===
- —— (1987). Angel. Women's Press. ISBN 9780704340824.
- —— (1998). Angel. Seal Press. ISBN 9781580050142.
- —— (1995). The Colour of Forgetting. Virago Press. ISBN 9781853818929.
- —— (2023). Ocean Stirrings: A Work of Fiction in Tribute to Louise Langdon Norton Little, Working Mother and Activist, Mother of Malcolm X and Seven Siblings. Peepal Tree Press. ISBN 9781845235529.

=== Short stories ===
- —— (1990). Rain Darling. Women's Press. ISBN 9780704342583.
- —— (2011). The Ladies are Upstairs. Peepal Tree Press. ISBN 9781845231798.

=== Biographies ===
- —— (2013). The Governor's Story: The Authorised Biography of Dame Hilda Bynoe. Peepal Tree Press. ISBN 9781845232245.
