= Beverley East =

American novelist (born 1953)

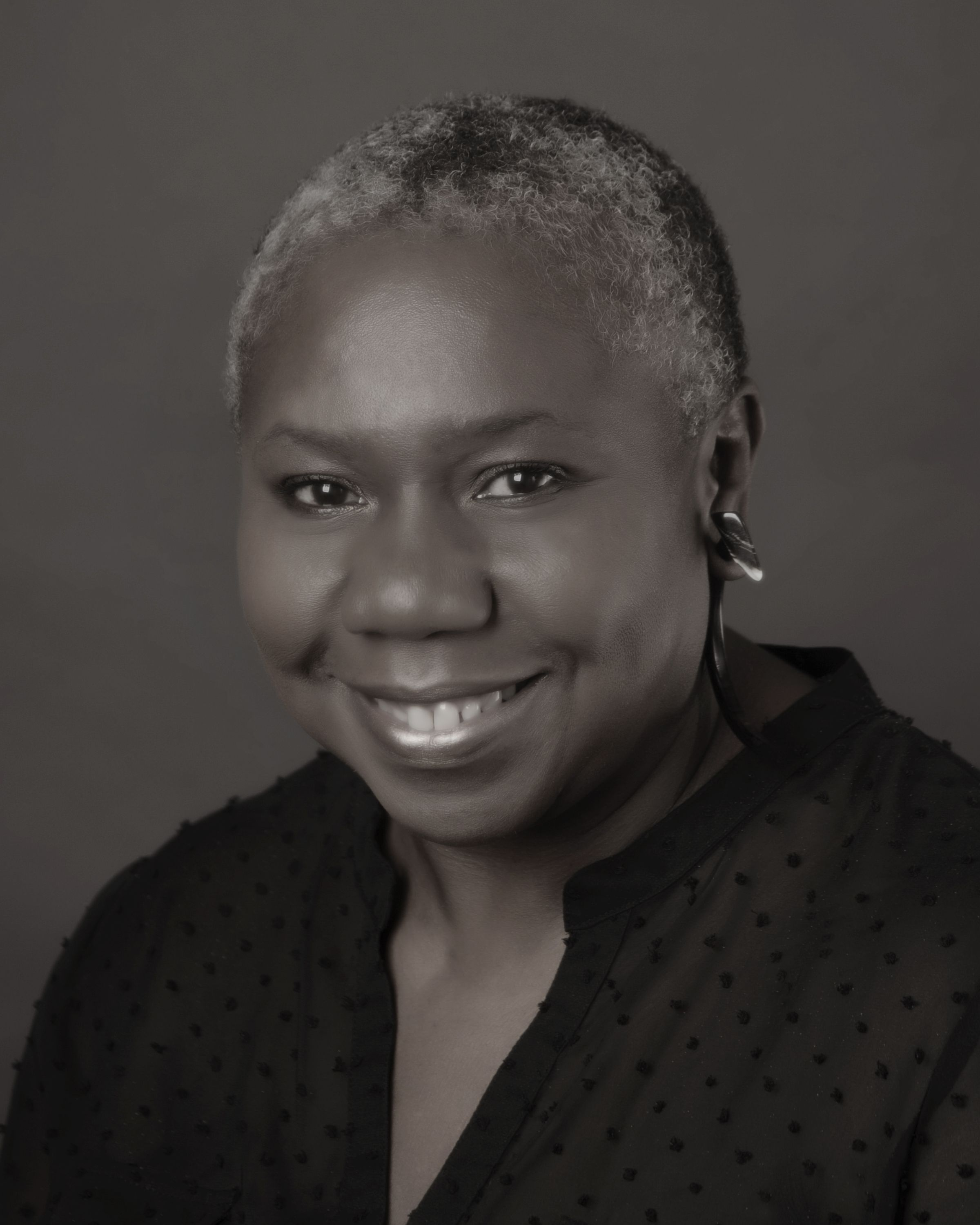
- Born: 31 May 1953 (age 72); Kingston, Jamaica
- Education: Westminster Kingsway College; College of Distributive Trades
- Occupations: QDE, author
- Website: http://www.suspectsignatures.com/

Beverley East (born 31 May 1953) is a leading expert in the field of handwriting analysis, a court-qualified forensic document examiner and author. She works in her home city of Washington, DC, and in Jamaica.

== Education ==
Though born in Kingston, Jamaica, East attended Westminster Kingsway College in London, graduating with A-levels in English Language, Literature and German and O-levels in British Economic and Social History, German, Italian, English Literature and Language, Sociology

East attended the College of Distributive Trades in London and earned a degree in CAM Dip (Marketing, PR and Advertising).

She began studying graphology at the International Graphoanalysis Society and was certified in 1989. She earned her Master's in Graphoanalysis from the International Graphoanalysis Society. In 1993, she became a Certified Questioned Document Examiner (QDE) for the National Bureau of Questioned Document Examiners in New York, NY.

== Career ==
East trained and apprenticed in Forensic Document Examination by Felix Klein (1911–1994), the founder of the National Society for Graphology and the founder of the National Bureau of Document Examiners.

She authenticated handwriting on the labels of 1,700-item butterfly collection assembled by naturalist Alfred Russel Wallace for the then-owner of the collection, attorney Robert Haggestad, who purchased the collection for $600. Haggestad asked East to authenticate the handwriting, which she did. The collection was later purchased by the Smithsonian for a substantial sum ($4.5 million).

East was the handwriting expert in the 2012 court case of the Jamaican Stone Crusher Gang, where police fabricated witness statements against members. Accused gang members were later released because of the evidence being false.

East has also been asked by the media to comment on the handwriting of news worthy events. In 1998, "The Reliable Source", a respected column in The Washington Post, asked her to review Monica Lewinsky’s handwriting. East was also asked to comment on handwriting samples from the anthrax mailings case for a National Geographic Channel documentary.

In addition to being a leading authority in handwriting analysis, East is an author. In June 2014, she was named by Ebony magazine as one of "six Caribbean writers you should take some time to discover" (alongside Mervyn Morris, Andrea Stuart, Ann-Margaret Lim, Roland Watson-Grant, and Tiphanie Yanique, who were attending the Calabash International Literary Festival in Jamaica). her first book, Finding Mr. Write: A New Slant on Selecting the Perfect Mate (2000), became a bestseller after it received major media coverage, including East being interviewed by Diane Sawyer on Good Morning America.

== Books ==
- Finding Mr. Write: A New Slant on Selecting the Perfect Mate, Villard, 2000.
- Reaper of Souls: A Novel of the Kendal Crash, 2007, Great House OmniMedia Ltd.
- Bat Mitzvah Girl – Memories of a Jamaican Child, 2013.

== Awards ==
East was awarded the Flori Roberts – Ladies First Trailblazer award in 2002, for being the first woman of colour to be qualified to and practice graphology and QDE.

East was awarded the Forerunner Award from the Institute of Caribbean Studies in November 2015 in Washington D.C.

== Sources ==
- Petre Williams-Raynor, "Your Handwriting: All This Pro Needs to Gauge Who You Are ", Jamaica Observer, 19 February 2012
- "She Can See Write Through You," Black Enterprise Magazine, June 2000, p. 92.
- Jean Lowrie-Chin, "Beverley East's Big Idea", Jamaica Observer, 21 December 2009.
