= Susheila Nasta =

British critic, editor, academic and literary activist (born 1953)

Susheila Nasta MBE, Hon. FRSL
- Born: 1953 (age 72–73); London, UK
- Education: University of Kent; University of London
- Occupations: Critic, editor, academic and literary activist
- Known for: Founding editor of Wasafiri magazine

Susheila Nasta (born 1953) is a British critic, editor, academic and literary activist. She is Professor of Modern and Contemporary Literatures at Queen Mary University of London, and founding editor of Wasafiri, the UK's leading magazine for international contemporary writing. She is a recipient of the Benson Medal from the Royal Society of Literature.

== Biography ==
Susheila Nasta was born in London, England. She grew up in India, Germany and The Netherlands, before returning to Britain to complete her education. She undertook undergraduate and graduate studies at the University of Kent, and the University of London.

Her commitment to diversifying the literature curriculum and expanding the remit of English studies has been demonstrated throughout the decades since her involvement with the Association for the Teaching of African and Caribbean Literature (ATCAL), which led to the founding in 1984 of the journal Wasafiri, with Nasta as editor-in-chief. Recollecting the magazine's early days, she has written: "In those days, before computers and the now almost immediate communication channels of digital culture, editing was a much slower and more physical process. Comments on stories or poems were made on hard copy, snail mail carried the responses back and, when we finally reached the point of typesetting, the proofs were often delivered to my door by the East End Asian typesetting and printing company we used. I would mark them up in my Greenwich flat (then the makeshift office) and they would be dispatched onwards for printing."

Nasta started her career in school teaching, before moving into Higher Education in the 1980s. She has held posts in different departments at several universities, including at the University of Cambridge, the University of North London, the University of Portsmouth, the Open University, where she held a chair in Modern Literature and is now Professor Emeritus, and at Queen Mary University of London, where she taught between 1992 and 2000, before rejoining in 2017 as Professor of Modern and Contemporary Literatures.

Nasta has initiated and led numerous research projects, and since 2007 has led a major public-engagement project on Asian Britain. She co-edited (with Mark U. Stein) The Cambridge History of Black and Asian British Writing, published in 2020, acknowledged as the first such academic collection to cover some 300 years of Black and Asian British literature.

Nasta is a regular speaker at international conferences, festivals other literary events – notable recent appearances include "An Island Full of Voices: Writing Britain Now" at the British Library, participation in the NGC Bocas Lit Fest in Trinidad, symposia and panel discussions at Goldsmiths, University of London (where she was interviewed by Blake Morrison in October 2014 on Wasafiri's 30th anniversary) and presentations at the Mathrubhumi International Festival of Letters in Trivandrum, Kerala – and she has served as a judge for literary prizes including the OCM Bocas Prize for Caribbean Literature, the SI Leeds Literary Prize, and the Queen Mary Wasafiri New Writing Prize. She has also curated and advised on such exhibitions as At the Heart of the Nation: Indians in Britain, and 2018's Windrush: Songs in a Strange Land for the British Library.

She has published widely on post-colonial and contemporary writing, particularly on literature from the Caribbean, the South Asian diaspora and black Britain. She has special expertise in the work of Samuel Selvon (for whom she is literary executor), Jean Rhys, Jamaica Kincaid, as well as on women's writing from Africa, the Caribbean and South Asia.

Nasta's 2019 publication, the anthology Brave New Words: The Power of Writing Now (Myriad Editions), celebrating 35 years of Wasafiri under her editorship, contains contributions by writers who include Bernardine Evaristo, Romesh Gunesekera, James Kelman, Kei Miller, Blake Morrison, Caryl Phillips, Olumide Popoola, Bina Shah, and Mukoma Wa Ngugi, among others. The reviewer for Dawn newspaper noted: "...a common thread in several essays is the discomfort of not fully embracing any one 'home' or place of belonging. By studying immigrants’ experiences, the disillusionment that lies behind many such aspirations is probed.... Brave New Words explores the theme of exclusion at various levels — it articulates not only the consequences of being expelled from countries and territorial affiliations, but from language itself....Personal memoirs ... where writers venture into terra incognita as they delve into the abyss of memory make these essays so rewarding."

== Awards and honours ==
In 2011, Nasta was appointed an MBE in the New Year Honours for her services to Black and Asian Literature. In 2019, she was made an Honorary Fellow of the Royal Society of Literature (RSL) and was awarded the RSL's Benson Medal for exceptional contribution to literature, presented by Marina Warner. In 2020, she became an Honorary Fellow of The English Association.

== Selected bibliography ==
- Motherlands: Black Women's Writing from Africa, the Caribbean, and South Asia, Rutgers University Press, 1992, ISBN 978-0813517810
- African, Caribbean and South Asian Fiction in English – A select bibliography, The British Council, 1992, ISBN 978-0863551369
- Home Truths: Fictions of the South Asian Diaspora in Britain, Palgrave, 2001, ISBN 978-0333670057
- India in Britain: South Asian Networks and Connections, 1858–1950, Palgrave, 2012, ISBN 978-0230392717
- Asian Britain: A Photographic History (Introduction by Razia Iqbal), The Westbourne Press, 2013, ISBN 978-1908906113

As editor

- Writing Across Worlds: Contemporary Writers Talk, Routledge, 2004, ISBN 978-0415345675
- Critical Perspectives on Sam Selvon, Washington, D.C.: Three Continents Press, 1988, ISBN 0894102389
- Reading the 'New' Literatures in a Post-Colonial Era, D.S. Brewer, 2000, ISBN 978-0859916011
- Brave New Words: The Power of Writing Now, Myriad Editions, 2019, ISBN 978-1912408207
- With Mark U. Stein, The Cambridge History of Black and Asian British, Cambridge University Press, 2020, ISBN 978-1107195448
