= Louise Little =

Grenadan-American activist (1890s–1989)

- Louise and Earl Little in an undated photo
- Born: Louise Helen Norton Langdon; 4 November 1894 or 17 November 1897; La Digue, Saint Andrew Parish, Grenada
- Died: December 18, 1989 (aged 92–95); Lilley Township, Michigan, U.S.
- Occupation: Activist
- Spouse: Earl Little (m. 1919; died 1931)
- Children: 8, including Malcolm X

Louise Helen Norton Little (née Langdon; 1894 or 1897 – December 18, 1989) was a Grenadian-born American activist. She was the mother of Malcolm X.

== Early years and family ==
Louise Helen Norton Langdon was born in La Digue, Saint Andrew Parish, Grenada, to Ella Langdon in either 1894 or 1897. Ella was the daughter of Jupiter and Mary Jane Langdon, both of whom were kidnapped from Africa, and sold into slavery. The pair were freed by the British Royal Navy and eventually transported to the Grenadian village of La Digue. It has been claimed that Louise's mother, Ella, one of six children of the Langdons, was raped by a "significantly older" Scotsman named Norton, resulting in Louise's birth.

In later years, Louise's maternal uncle, Egerton Langdon, stated that her father was a bank teller from England. A local historian has suggested that Louise had an older brother, Ruford, who died at only a few years of age.

Little was raised by her grandparents, Jupiter and Mary Jane, until Jupiter's death in 1901 and Mary Jane's death in 1916. She was educated in a local Anglican school, and was fluent in English, French and Grenadian Creole French. After her grandmother's death, she emigrated from Grenada in 1917 to Montreal, where her uncle Egerton Langdon introduced her to Garveyism and the Universal Negro Improvement Association (UNIA).

== Career ==
Through the UNIA in Montreal, she met Earl Little, a craftsman and a lay minister from Reynolds, Georgia. The couple married on May 10, 1919. The following year, they moved to Philadelphia because they believed that their lives in that city would be better than their lives in Canada, and then, they moved to Omaha, Nebraska in 1921. While she was in Omaha, she became the secretary and the "branch reporter" of the UNIA's local chapter, sending news about local UNIA activities, led by Earl, to Negro World; they inculcated self-reliance and black pride in their children. Their son Malcolm, who became famous as Malcolm X, later said that white violence killed four of his father's brothers. Another son, Wilfred, later remembered that Louise "received letters from the leaders of the movement thanking her for the work she had done and praising her for her devotion to the cause". Earl and Louise had seven children together: Wilfred (1920–1998), Hilda (1921–2015), Philbert (1923–1993), Malcolm (1925–1965), Reginald (1927–2001), Wesley (1928–2009), and Yvonne (1929–2003). Her eighth child, Robert (1938–1999), had a different father.

Because of threats from the Ku Klux Klan – Earl's UNIA activities were said to be "spreading trouble" – the family relocated to Milwaukee, Wisconsin in 1926, and shortly thereafter, the family relocated to Lansing, Michigan. There the family was frequently harassed by the Black Legion, a white racist group. When the family home burned in 1929, Earl accused the Black Legion.

In 1931, Earl died in what was officially ruled a streetcar accident, though Louise believed Earl had been murdered by the Black Legion. Rumors that white racists were responsible for Earl's death were widely circulated, and were very disturbing to Louise and their children. After a dispute with creditors, Louise received a nominal life insurance benefit of $1,000 ($21,000 in 2025 dollars (Note: 1634–1699: McCusker, J. J. (1997). How Much Is That in Real Money? A Historical Price Index for Use as a Deflator of Money Values in the Economy of the United States: Addenda et Corrigenda (PDF). American Antiquarian Society. 1700–1799: McCusker, J. J. (1992). How Much Is That in Real Money? A Historical Price Index for Use as a Deflator of Money Values in the Economy of the United States (PDF). American Antiquarian Society. 1800–present: Federal Reserve Bank of Minneapolis. "Consumer Price Index (estimate) 1800–".)) in payments of $18 per month; the issuer of another, larger policy refused to pay, claiming her husband Earl had committed suicide. To make ends meet Louise rented out part of her garden, and her sons hunted game.

During the 1930s, white Seventh-day Adventists witnessed to the Little family; later on Louise Little and her son Wilfred were baptized into the Seventh-day Adventist Church. In 1937, a man Louise had been dating‍—‌marriage had seemed a possibility‍—‌vanished from her life when she became pregnant with his child, Robert (1938–1999). In late 1938 she had a nervous breakdown and was committed to Kalamazoo State Hospital. The children were separated and sent to foster homes.

Little was institutionalized at the Kalamazoo Mental Hospital from 1939 through 1963. Malcolm‍—‌who rose to fame as Malcolm X, a leading minister of the Nation of Islam‍—‌joined his siblings in securing her release from the hospital. She lived with her surviving family and descendants for the rest of her life in Grand Rapids, Michigan. In 2024, a billboard was erected in La Digue, Grenada to mark Little's birthplace.

== In popular culture ==
- Louise Little is the primary protagonist of Merle Collins' historical novel, Ocean Stirrings (Peepal Tree Press, 2023).

== See also ==
- Bibliography of Malcolm X
- Bibliography of Martin Luther King Jr.
