= Reef (novel) =

1994 novel by Romesh Gunesekera

- 20th anniversary edition cover
- Author: Romesh Gunesekera
- Language: English
- Genre: Literary fiction Historical fiction Asian literature
- Publisher: Granta Books (UK)
- Publication date: June 30, 1994 (UK); April 1, 1995 (US)
- Publication place: Sri Lanka, UK
- Media type: Print (hardback) and (paperback)
- Pages: 192pp (UK paperback edition); 180pp (2011 UK edition)
- ISBN: 978-1-8620-7094-3

Reef is a historical fiction novel written by Sri Lankan-born British author Romesh Gunesekera, first published by Granta Books in 1994. Written in English and set in Sri Lanka, it tells the story of a talented young chef named Triton who is so committed to pleasing his master, Mr. Salgado, a marine biologist obsessed with swamps and seafood, that he is oblivious to the political unrest threatening his country. It is Gunesekera's debut novel and second book, following his 1992 collection of short stories, Monkfish Moon.

It was shortlisted for the Booker Prize in 1994, but lost to How Late It Was, How Late by James Kelman amid much controversy; and the Guardian Fiction Prize the same year.

== Plot ==
Triton is a young chef who was forced to leave his father's house to work for Mr. Ranjan Salgado, a marine biologist obsessed by swamps, sea movements, and a Sri Lankan island's disappearing reef. Almost immediately, thanks to his master's obsessions, Triton works hard to please him with his carefully prepared delicacies. But neither of them know that the political unrest threatening Sri Lanka will have a devastating influence on them, most significantly on Triton. A kind of radical uprise of violent Marxist furor is introduced through the character of Wijetunga.

== Awards and nominations ==
=== Awards ===
- 1997 Premio Mondello Five Continents Asia Prize - Winner
- 1994 Yorkshire Post First Work Prize - Winner
- 1994 New Voice Award - Winner
- 1994 The Economist Book of the Month

=== Nominations ===
- 1996 International Dublin Literary Award - Longlisted
- 1994 Booker Prize - Shortlisted
- 1994 Guardian Fiction Prize - Shortlisted
