= Bernie Grant Arts Centre =

Purpose-built arts centre in Tottenham, London

Coordinates: 51°35′15″N 0°4′21″W

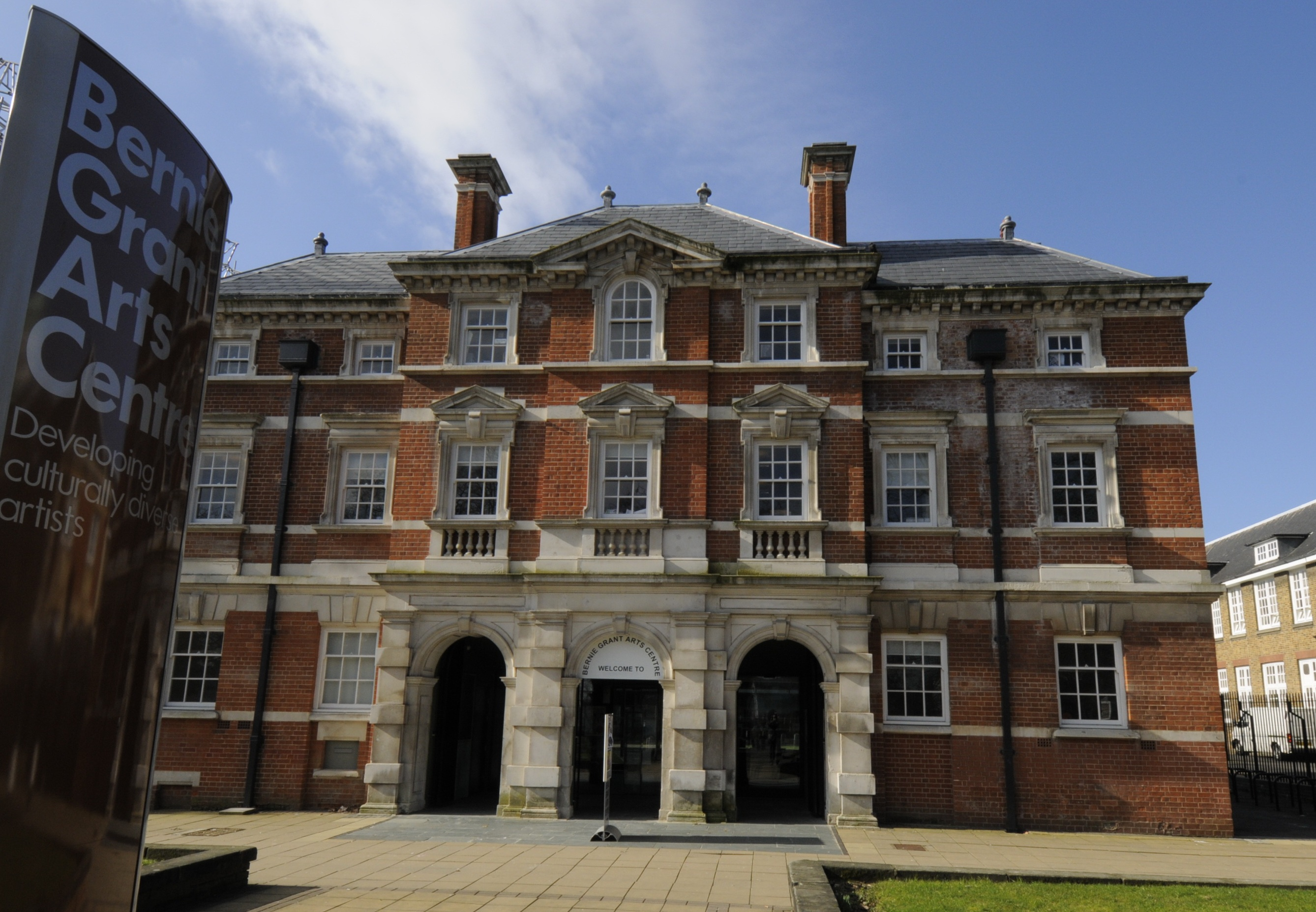
- Interactive map of Bernie Grant Arts Centre

Construction
- Opened: September 2007; 19 years ago
- Architect: David Adjaye

Website
- www.berniegrantcentre.co.uk

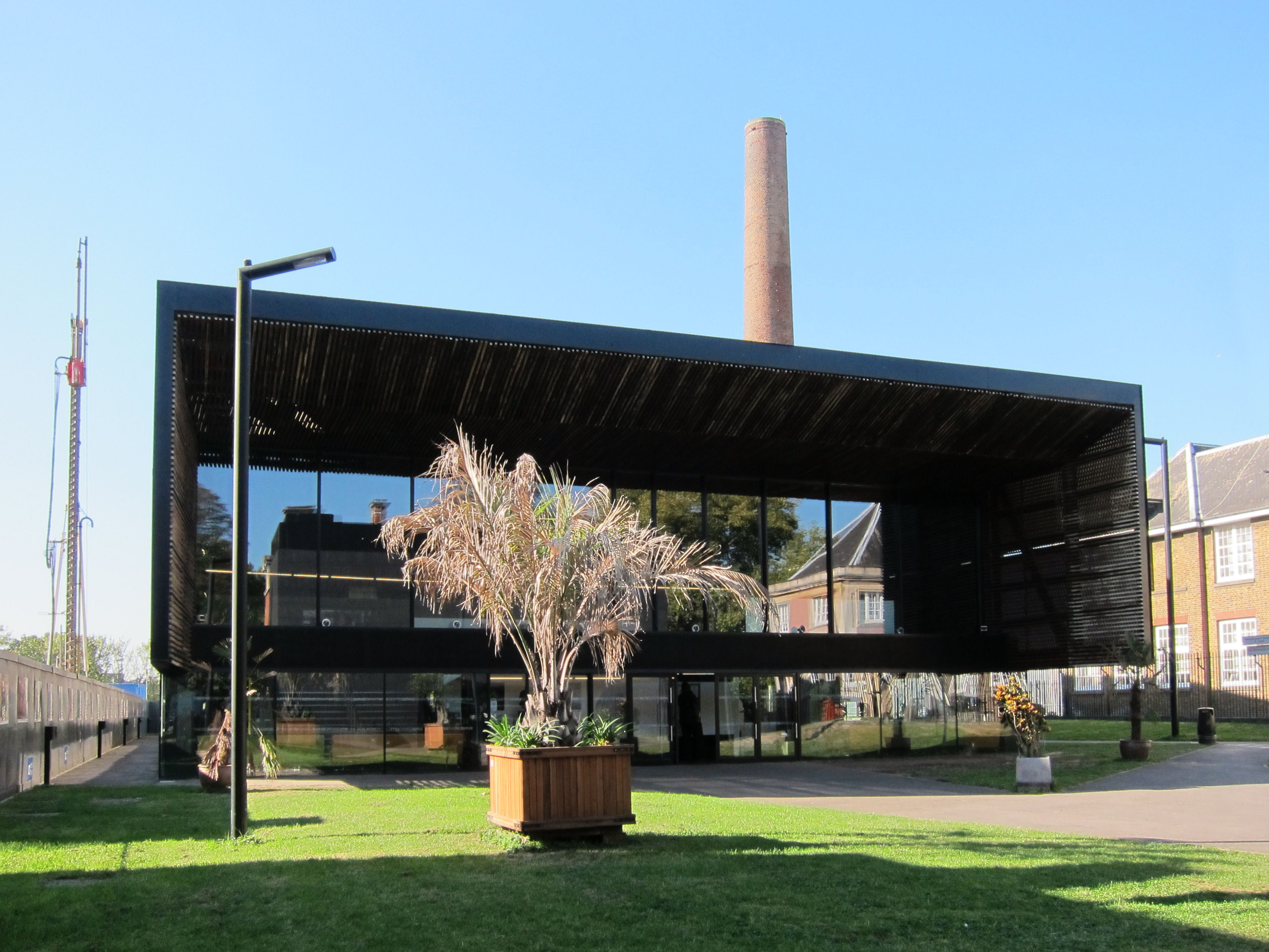
The rear entrance

The Bernie Grant Arts Centre (BGAC) is a £15 million purpose-built multi-arts centre, which includes a 274-seat auditorium, studio/rehearsal space, café/bar, enterprise centre and open spaces. It is located next to the Town Hall in Tottenham, North London. The centre was designed by Ghanaian-British architect David Adjaye and opened in September 2007.

It is named in honour of Bernie Grant, MP, who represented the area. It was an initiative started before his death in 2000, through which he aspired to create "a unique showcase for international multicultural talent".

From from 2019 until June 2025, the Artistic Director/CEO of the Bernie Grant Arts Centre was Hannah Azieb Pool, with Geoffrey Williams as chair of the organization's board. In 2026, Paul Reid became the new CEO.
