= Minoli Salgado =

Sri Lankan author

- Born: Kuala Lumpur, Malaysia
- Education: University of Sussex (BA); University of Manchester (PGCE); University of Warwick (MA, PhD)
- Occupations: Writer and academic
- Writing career
- Notable work: A Little Dust on the Eyes
- Notable awards: SI Leeds Literary Prize
- Website: minolisalgado.com

Minoli Salgado is a Sri Lankan writer and academic based in the United Kingdom who was born in Malaysia and educated mainly in England. She has written extensively on migrant studies and diasporic literature and is the author of the critically acclaimed work Writing Sri Lanka. She also writes fiction and poetry, and her debut novel A Little Dust on the Eyes won the inaugural SI Leeds Literary Prize in 2012.

== Biography ==
Born in Kuala Lumpur, Malaysia, Minoli Salgado was brought up in Sri Lanka, South East Asia and England, attending schools in Penang Hill, Colombo and North Devon, before going on to university studies in English Literature. She earned a BA degree from the University of Sussex, PGCE from University of Manchester, and after gaining a PhD in Indo Anglian fiction from the University of Warwick she returned to the University of Sussex, where for many years she taught postcolonial literature, holding the positions of Tutorial Fellow, Lecturer, Senior Lecturer, Reader and Professor of English. In 2020, she joined Manchester Metropolitan University as Professor of International Writing, and she is founding Director of the Centre for Migration and Postcolonial Studies (MAPS).

Her 2006 book, Writing Sri Lanka: Literature, Resistance and the Politics of Place, is considered an influential study of Sri Lankan literature in English. The first major study of Sri Lankan literature in English, it was researched by Salgado supported by a Leverhulme Fellowship and AHRC Research Grant.

In 2012, her debut novel A Little Dust on the Eyes won the inaugural SI Leeds Literary Prize, and in 2014 was published by Peepal Tree Press, being launched that year at the Southbank Centre as part of the London Literature Festival. The novel was also longlisted for the DSC Prize for South Asian Literature.

Her collection of short stories, Broken Jaw, was shortlisted for the Republic of Consciousness Prize and longlisted for the Orwell Prize for Political Fiction in 2020.

== Selected bibliography ==
- Writing Sri Lanka: Literature, Resistance and the Politics of Place (Routledge, 2007, ISBN 9780415364188)
- A Little Dust on the Eyes – novel (Peepal Tree Press, 2014, ISBN 9781845232405)
- Broken Jaw – short stories (London: The 87 Press, 2019, ISBN 9781916477445)
- Twelve Cries from Home: In Search of Sri Lanka's Disappeared - non-fiction (Repeater Books, 2022, ISBN 9781914420054)
