= Dagny, or a Love Feast =

2011 novel by Zurab Karumidze

First edition (publ. Siesta)

Dagny, or a Love Feast is a novel written in English by the Georgian author Zurab Karumidze. It was first published in Tbilisi in 2011 and was longlisted for the International Dublin Literary Award in 2013. It was published again in 2014 in the United States.

The novel revolves around the real-life story of Dagny Juel, a Norwegian writer best known for her romantic liaisons with a number of artistic figures of fin-de-siècle Europe such as Edvard Munch. Murdered during a journey to Tbilisi in 1901, Juel's tragically short bohemian life is magnified by Karumidze's narrative explorations of fin-de-siècle mysticism and eroticism through such figures as Gurdjieff.
