= Hannah Pool =

British–Eritrean writer and journalist (born 1974)

- Born: Hannah Azieb Pool; 1974 (age 51–52) near Keren, Ethiopia
- Education: Liverpool University
- Occupations: Writer and journalist
- Notable credit: The Guardian

Hannah Azieb Pool (born 1974) is a British–Eritrean writer and journalist. She was born near the town of Keren during the war for independence from Ethiopia. She is a former staff writer for The Guardian newspaper, and writes for national and international media. She is a patron of the SI Leeds Literary Prize for unpublished fiction by Black and Asian women in the UK. Pool was artistic director/CEO at the Bernie Grant Arts Centre in Tottenham, north London, from 2019 until June 2025.

== Early life and education ==
At the age of six months, Pool was adopted by a British scholar working in Sudan. At first, she was raised in Khartoum and then Norway, before finally settling in Manchester, England. She grew up believing that her genetic parents had died shortly after her birth. She was educated at Liverpool University, where she studied Sociology.

== Career ==
After leaving university, Pool became a journalist on the Manchester Evening News. She has written extensively for The Guardian newspaper, where for several years she wrote the weekly column "The New Black", the first fashion and beauty column for women of colour in a national UK newspaper.

At the age of 19, she received a letter telling her that her genetic father and siblings were alive in Eritrea. Her memoir, My Fathers' Daughter: A story of family and belonging, was published in 2005 and is an account of the journey she made back to Eritrea, aged 29, and her encounters with her family.

Pool was a senior programmer of contemporary culture at the Southbank Centre, London. In February 2019, she became the artistic director/CEO at the Bernie Grant Arts Centre in Tottenham, stepping down at the end of June 2025. She is founder of the Tottenham Literature Festival, is a trustee of the London International Festival of Theatre (LIFT), serves on the Artist's Advisory Board of the Manchester International Festival and is also a patron of the SI Leeds Literary Prize for unpublished fiction by Black and Asian women in the UK.

Pool is a contributor to the 2019 anthology New Daughters of Africa, edited by Margaret Busby.

== Bibliography ==
- My Fathers' Daughter, London: Hamish Hamilton Ltd, 2005. ISBN 0241142601. ISBN 978-0241142608
- Fashion Cities Africa (editor), University of Chicago Press, 2016. ISBN 978-1783206117
