= Christian Campbell (poet) =

Trinidadian-Bahamian writer and critic (born 1979)

- Born: 1979 (age 46–47); Bahamas
- Education: Queens College; Macalester College; Balliol College, Oxford University; Duke University
- Occupations: Poet, essayist, critic
- Years active: 2010–present
- Notable work: Running the Dusk (2010)
- Awards: Aldeburgh First Collection Prize

Christian Campbell (born 1979) is a Trinidadian-Bahamian poet, essayist, and cultural critic who has resided in the Caribbean, the United States, the United Kingdom, and Canada. As an academic, he served as an assistant professor in the Department of English at the University of Toronto.

== Education and career ==
Christian Campbell was born in the Bahamas of Bahamian and Trinidadian heritage. He went to Queen's College high school, graduating at the age of 15, and attended Macalester College on scholarship, graduating at the age of 19. He went on to earn an M.Phil. in Modern British Literature from Balliol College, Oxford University, where he studied as a Rhodes Scholar, and then an M.A. and a Ph.D. from Duke University.

He was an assistant professor of English at the English department of University of Toronto, where in 2010 he invited Nobel Prize Laureate Derek Walcott. Campbell's teaching and research interests comprised Caribbean Literature; Black Diaspora Literatures and Cultures; Cultural Studies/Popular Culture; Poetry/Poetics; Postcolonial Theory; Creative Writing.

Campbell represented The Bahamas at the Cultural Olympiad's Poetry Parnassus in 2012 at the Southbank Centre in London.

== Writing ==
In 2010, Campbell won the best first collection prize at the Aldeburgh Festival in Suffolk for his Running the Dusk (Peepal Tree Press, 2010). Furthermore, the work was shortlisted for the Forward Prize for Best First Collection, the Cave Canem Prize and the Guyana Prize for Literature. Publications in which his work has been published, featured or reviewed include The New York Times, The Guardian, Small Axe, Callaloo, The Financial Times, The Routledge Companion to Anglophone Caribbean Literature, and New Caribbean Poetry: An Anthology (2007, edited by Kei Miller).

== Personal life ==
Of Bahamian and Trinidadian heritage, Campbell has lived in the Caribbean, the US, the UK and in Canada. He describes himself as "a nomad that comes from nomads".

== Works ==
- Running the Dusk (2010), Peepal Tree Press. Translated into Spanish as Correr el Crepúsculo (Cuba: Ediciones Santiago).
