= SI Leeds Literary Prize =

British literary award

The SI Leeds Literary Prize
- Awarded for: For unpublished fiction written by Black and Asian women resident in the UK
- Country: United Kingdom
- Presented by: Soroptimist International of Leeds (SI Leeds)
- First award: 2012; 14 years ago
- Website: www.sileedsliteraryprize.com

The SI Leeds Literary Prize is a biennial award founded in 2012 by Soroptimist International of Leeds (SI Leeds) – a branch of the worldwide women's organization Soroptimist International – for unpublished fiction written by Black and Asian women resident in the UK. Submissions must be of more than 30,000 words of fiction and entrants must be aged 18 years and over. The prize offers support for writers to develop their work and to help build new audiences.

Described as "groundbreaking", the prize has been developed and managed by SI Leeds in partnership with Ilkley Literature Festival and Leeds-based publishers Peepal Tree Press. Among other partners are The Literary Consultancy (TLC), Writing on the Wall (WOW), the Arvon Foundation, New Writing North, and Leeds Library and Information Service. According to TLC Director Aki Schilz: "The SI Leeds Prize offers a vital opportunity to women writers from black and Asian communities whose voices as we all know are often marginalised from the publishing landscape. It is encouraging to feel that that landscape is finally making shifts in the direction of genuinely more representative and inclusive publishing, with a springing-up of initiatives and a rallying cry from those demanding to be heard and for the right to tell their stories as well as be given the critical artistic freedom to write creatively."

As of 2014, patrons of the prize include Bernardine Evaristo, Bidisha, Bonnie Greer, Carolyn Choa, Diana Evans, Diana Howse, Dreda Say Mitchell, Hannah Pool, Margaret Oldroyd (president of Soroptimist International Great Britain and Ireland), Maya Jaggi, Pippa Small, Sue Woodford-Hollick and Yasmin Alibhai-Brown, with Margaret Busby as prize ambassador and Irenosen Okojie as prize advocate.

== Background ==
The SI Leeds Literary Prize "aims to act as a loudspeaker for Black and Asian women's voices, enabling fresh and original literary voices from a group disproportionately under-represented in mainstream literary culture to reach new audiences." Irenosen Okojie, speaking of the necessity for the prize, states:

"There's a big disparity between what we see reflected on the shelves and the wonderful diverse voices that are out there. The prize aims to address that imbalance somewhat and to provide a platform for marginalized voices that are largely ignored.... There are also very few black and Asian professionals working within the industry which has an impact in terms of who the gatekeepers are. Who gets to decide what voices should be heard and which stories are worth publishing?...If we have more diversity within the infrastructure, that might filter through to work that gets commissioned. A national prize like the SI Leeds Literary Prize is about celebrating the voices of black and Asian women."

Kerry Young, chair of the 2014 panel of judges, said in an interview for Sable magazine: "It's the only prize for unpublished fiction by Black and Asian women writers. That's the first thing. Secondly, it's the opportunities it offers not just in the cash awards but, for the winning author, to have a free place on an Arvon creative writing course of their choice; and for Peepal Tree Press to consider their manuscript for publication. That is huge. And for the runner-up and the other shortlisted authors there is a combination of writer development support and manuscript assessment from The Literary Consultancy; and one-to-one professional development support from Peepal Tree Press. So the prize is an all round package to help writers develop not just reward them for their existing achievements."

In the words of patron Carolyn Choa, "The prize endeavours to encourage those not born into the mainstream of British culture, and offers a possible course towards the rich, all-embracing intellectual landscape of which Britain so rightly boasts."

== 2012 prize ==
The 2012 prize (judged by Margaret Busby, Hannah Bannister and Gail Bolland) was won by Minoli Salgado for A Little Dust on the Eyes (published in 2014 by Peepal Tree Press). In second place was Borrowed Light by Karen Onojaife, who also won the SI Readers' Choice award; and tied third were A Tiny Speck of Black and then Nothing by Emily Midorikawa, and Storybank: The Milkfarm Years by Jane Steele. Also shortlisted were Katy Massey for The Book of Ghosts and Anita Sivakumaran for The Weekend for Sex.

== 2014 prize ==
The 2014 judges – Kerry Young, Gail Bolland, Elise Dillsworth and Kadija George – chose as first prizewinner Mahsuda Snaith for The Constellation of Ravine Roy. Season Butler won second prize for Hanging from the Hammer of the Bell, and Anita Sivakumaran won third prize for The Queen. The SI Readers' Choice award, chosen from the shortlist by some 20 SI members, went to Kit de Waal for Blue in Green.

== 2016 prize ==
The 2016 winner — judged by Kadija George, Margaret Oldroyd, Karen Onojaife and Susan Yearwood — was Amita Murray for Marmite and Mango Chutney, with second prize going to Winnie M. Li for Dark Chapter and third prize, and the SI Readers' Choice award, to Jamilah Ahmed for Recognising Strangers.

== 2018 prize ==
The 2018 Aspire-igen first prize winner – chosen by a judging panel chaired by Susheila Nasta – was Shereen Tadros for Say Goodbye to Her, second prize going to Yvonne Singh for One Man's Revolution, and third prize to Kavita Bhanot for Baba ji on Boulton Road, with the SI Readers' Choice award, based on 22 votes from SI members across the UK and Nepal, going to Omega Douglas for Hibiscus, Rose, Jacaranda.

== 2020 prize ==
The Aspire-igen first prize went to Wenyan Lu for The Funeral Cryer, LM Dillsworth took the runner-up award for The Sun Sets in the East, and Sumana Khan won third prize and the SI Readers' Choice award for The Good Twin.

== 2022 prize ==
In 2022, the first prize and The Opportunity Centre award was won by Suad Kamardeen for Never Enough, the runner up being Sometimes the Sky is Blue by Latoyah Innerarity, while third place and the SI Readers' Choice award went to Lying Perfectly Still by Laura Fish.

== See also ==
- List of literary awards honoring women
