= Bina Shah =

Pakistan Literature

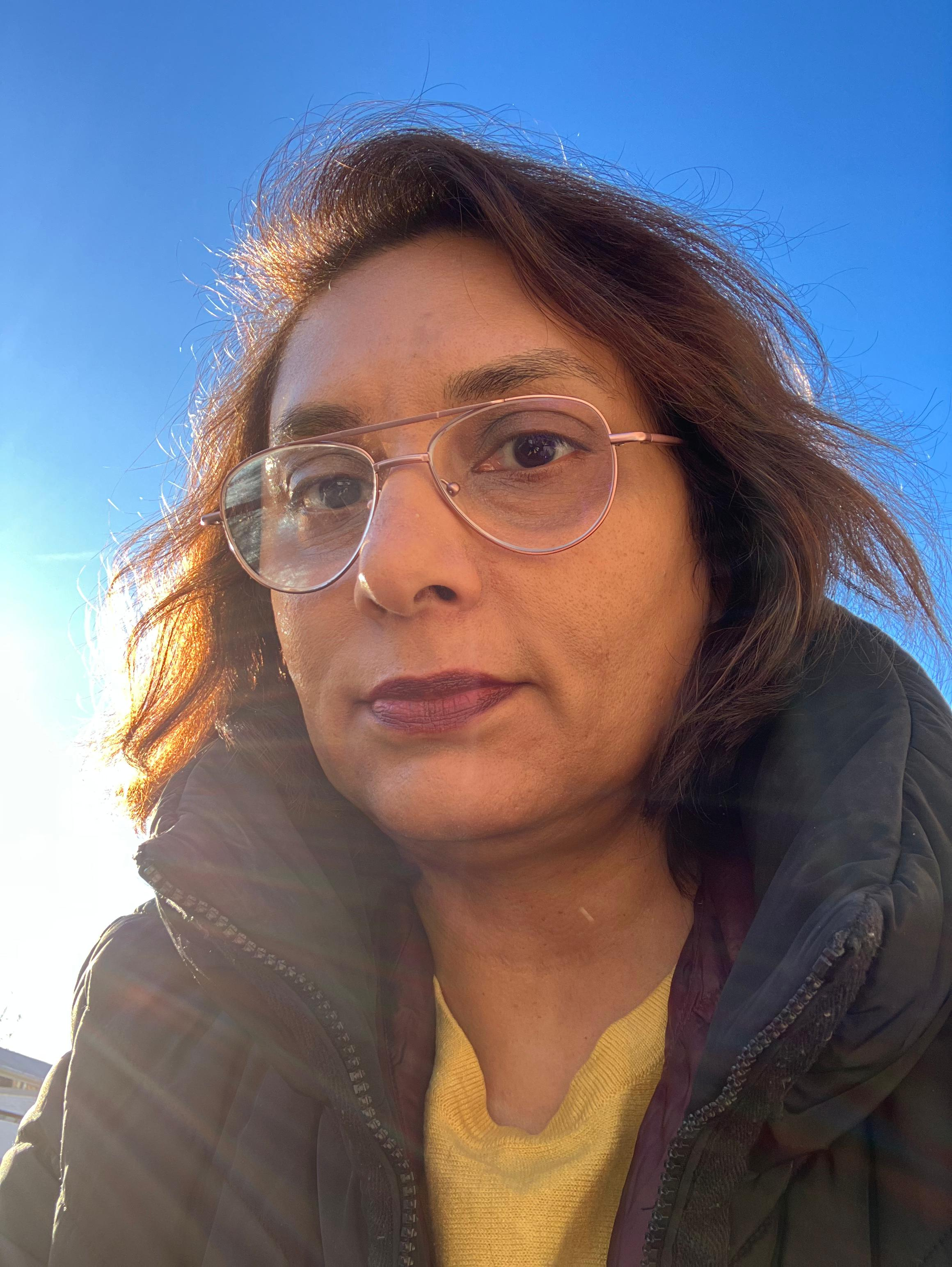
- Born: 1972 (age 53–54); Karachi, Pakistan
- Education: B.A. in Psychology from Wellesley College, MEd in Educational Technology from the Harvard Graduate School of Education
- Occupations: Novelist, essayist, journalist, academic
- Writing career
- Language: English
- Notable works: Before She Sleeps; The Monsoon War; A Season For Martyrs; Slum Child
- Notable awards: Chevalier of the Ordre des Arts et des Lettres by the French government in 2022

Bina Shah (born in 1972) is a Pakistani novelist, essayist, journalist and academic living in Karachi.

== Early years ==
Bina Shah was born in Karachi to a Sindhi family, the eldest of three children. She was raised in Virginia (United States) and in Karachi, Pakistan, where she attended the Karachi American School from kindergarten to 12th grade. She graduated from KAS in 1989.

In 2019 Shah published a non-fiction essay in Granta titled "When We Returned to Pakistan" The piece detailed her return to Pakistan from the United States in 1977, touching on issues of cultural alienation, loneliness, and adaptation to a new environment during a time of political turmoil.

== Education ==
She obtained a B.A. in Psychology from Wellesley College and an MEd in Educational Technology from the Harvard Graduate School of Education, USA.

Shah is a fellow of the University of Iowa, as an alum of the International Writing Program (2011). She is also a Fellow of the Hong Kong Baptist University as an alum of its International Writers Workshop.

== Media ==
Shah is the author of five novels and three collections of short stories. She has been published in English, Italian, French, Spanish, Danish, Chinese, German, Turkish and Vietnamese. Her novel Slum Child was published in 2008, while a historical fiction novel about Sindh, A Season For Martyrs was published in 2014 by Delphinium Books. Her fiction and non-fiction has appeared in Granta, The Independent, Wasafiri, Critical Muslim, InterlitQ, the Istanbul Review, Asian Cha, and the collection And the World Changed.

Shah was a contributing opinion writer from 2013-2015 for the International New York Times and an op-ed columnist for Dawn, a newspaper in Pakistan published in Karachi. She wrote a longstanding column for the Books and Authors section of the Dawn. She has written for Al Jazeera, The Huffington Post, The Guardian, and The Independent.

Shah writes extensively about Pakistani culture and society, women's rights, girls' education, and issues pertaining to technology, education, and freedom of expression. Her columns and her blog The Feministani has established Shah as one of Pakistan's foremost feminists and cultural commentators. She has been a frequent guest on the BBC, PRI's The World and NPR.

Shah is a two-time winner of Pakistan's Agahi Awards for excellence in journalism. Her short story "The Living Museum", won the Dr. Neila C. Sesachari prize from Weber University's literary journal, Weber - The Contemporary West. Shah donated the award money to the Karam Foundation in aid of Syrian refugees.

In 2022, Shah was presented by the Ambassador of France to Pakistan, Nicolas Galey, with the insignia of a Chevalier of the Ordre des Arts et des Lettres, an honorary award given by the French government.

In 2024, Shah was appointed the inaugural Writer-in-Residence at the Aga Khan University Faculty of Arts and Sciences (AKUFAS). She began teaching Expository Writing at AKUFAS in 2025.

== Books ==
Shah's first book, a volume of short stories called Animal Medicine, was published in 2000. Her first novel, Where They Dream in Blue, was published by Alhamra in 2001. A second novel, The 786 Cybercafé, was published by Alhamra in 2004. In 2005, her short story "The Optimist" was published in the anthology And the World Changed (Women Unlimited/OUP); an essay called "A Love Affair with Lahore" was published in an anthology edited by Bapsi Sidhwa called City of Sin and Splendour - Writings on Lahore (Penguin India - Pakistani title Beloved City -— OUP). In 2007 Alhamra published her second collection of short stories, Blessings.

Shah's third novel Slum Child was published in India by Tranquebar, an imprint of Westland-Tata, in 2010. An Italian-language version was published in 2009 under the title La Bambina Che Non Poteva Sognare by Newton Compton Editori in Italy, where it reached number 3 on the paperback bestseller list, and sold more than 20,000 copies. It was published in Spanish by Grijalbo, an imprint of Random House Mondadori, in June 2011.

Shah's fourth novel, A Season for Martyrs, was published by Delphinium Books (November 2014) to critical acclaim. It was also published in Italy by Newton Compton as Il Bambino Che Credeva Nella Liberta in 2010. For this novel, Shah was awarded the Premio Internazionale in the Un Mondi di Bambini category of the Almalfi Coast Literary Festival in 2010 for translated fiction.

Shah's fifth novel Before She Sleeps, a feminist dystopian novel, was published by Delphinium Books in 2018. An extract from the novel was featured in the Dawn's special 70th anniversary Pakistan edition "Seventy+Seventy". The novel was praised by Margaret Atwood on Twitter as "a fascinating new angle on 'emotional work'." American newspaper Los Angeles Times it "charged and thrilling." Before She Sleeps was recognized as part of a new canon of feminist dystopia pioneered by Booker Prize winning author Atwood and relevant to the global fight for women's rights and empowerment worldwide, as well as an important part of the #MeToo movement. Shah's novel was also considered noteworthy because it stood out from most Western-centric feminist dystopias, describing a futuristic society in the Middle East where women are forced into polygamous marriages by an authoritarian government in a society ravaged by war and disease.

Shah's sixth novel The Monsoon War, the sequel to Before She Sleeps and the second book in a dystopian trilogy, was published by Delphinium Books in 2023. The novel is set in a fragmented South Asia and follows women soldiers in a resistance movement. Shah is currently completing the third novel in the trilogy.

In 2019 Shah contributed an essay, "The Life and Death of Pakistan's Sabeen Mahmud", about the assassination of Pakistan's beloved human rights activist Sabeen Mahmud, to the anthology Brave New Words: The Power of Writing Now published by Myriad and edited by Susheila Nasta. The anthology of fifteen specially commissioned essays examining the value of critical thinking and the power of the written word was published to commemorate 35 years of Wasafiri, a UK magazine of international literature. Other contributors to the anthology included Booker Prize winner Bernardine Evaristo, Githa Hariharan, Eva Hoffman, Romesh Gunesekera, James Kelman, Tabish Khair, Kei Miller, Blake Morrison, Mukoma wa Ngugi, Hsiao-Hung Pai, and Marina Warner.

Shah contributed the short story "A Bird With One Wing" to the anthology The American Way: Stories of Invasion, published by Comma Press in 2021. The story was later reprinted in Dædalus, the journal of the American Academy of Arts and Sciences, in Spring 2023.

== Awards and honors ==
Shah has been the recipient of several awards and honors.

* Premio Internazionale, Un Mondi di Bambini category, Almalfi Coast Literary Festival, 2010 for the Italian translation Il Bambino Che Credeva Nella Liberta of her novel, A Season For Martyrs.
- Agahi Award for excellence in journalism, 2013, 2014/15.
- Dr. Neila C. Sesachari prize from Weber University's literary journal, Weber - The Contemporary West for her short story "The Living Museum"
- Salam Award for Imaginative Fiction, 2022, Finalist.
- Chevalier of the Ordre des Arts et des Lettres, 2022.
- Infaq-AdabFest English Fiction Writers' Award, 2024.
- KLF Getz Pharma English Fiction Prize for The Monsoon War, 2025.

== See also ==
- List of Pakistani writers
