= Association for the Teaching of Caribbean, African, Asian and Associated Literatures =

Non-profit organisation

The Association for the Teaching of Caribbean, African, Asian and Associated Literatures, or ATCAL, was founded with the aim of familiarizing British teachers with the range of "Black" writing that was available for school use. In the 1980s, ATCAL was a pressure group that played a key part in "the gradual process of expanding syllabuses in British schools, to include subjects such as contemporary black writing into the National Curriculum." ATCAL held annual conferences, compiled booklists for schools, and held meetings and workshops in order "to increase awareness of the importance of cultural diversity in British society in education at all levels".

== History ==
ATCAL (the acronym originally stood for the Association for the Teaching of African and Caribbean Literature, but was soon extended to include Asian material) was founded by past members of the Caribbean Artists Movement at a conference at the University of Kent in 1978, and was inaugurated in 1979, its first meeting — entitled "How to Teach Caribbean and African Literature in Schools" — being held at the Africa Centre, London. The organization campaigned for greater diversification of the English literature traditionally taught in UK schools at that time, and sought to get writers such as Derek Walcott, Jean Rhys and V. S. Naipaul included on the A-level syllabus. ATCAL published booklets on Third World literatures for schoolteachers, lobbied for such texts to be accepted by British Schools Examination Boards, and published the literary journal Wasafiri, which still continues, with Susheila Nasta as editor-in-chief.
