= Wenyan Lu =

Wenyan Lu, 陆文艳, is a Chinese novelist based in Cambridge, England. She won the 2020 SI Leeds Literary Prize and the 2024 Society of Authors McKitterick Prize for her debut novel The Funeral Cryer.

== Early and personal life ==
Lu is from Shanghai. She graduated with a Master of Studies in Creative Writing from the University of Cambridge. Lu moved to England in 2006 with her husband Mark. Previously based in Oxford, the couple now live in Cambridge with their two children. Lu has taught English as a foreign language in China, Mandarin as a foreign language in England, as well as creative writing.

== Works ==
- Lu, Wenyan (2023). The Funeral Cryer. ISBN 978-1-83895-756-8.
