= A Season for Martyrs =

2014 political novel by Bina Shah

- Author: Bina Shah
- Language: English
- Subject: Benazir Bhutto; Politics of Pakistan; Sindh
- Genre: Political novel
- Publisher: Delphinium Books
- Publication date: 4 November 2014
- Publication place: United States
- Media type: Print
- Pages: 288
- ISBN: 978-1-883285-61-6

A Season for Martyrs is a 2014 political novel by Pakistani writer Bina Shah. Published by Delphinium Books, it is set during the last three months of Benazir Bhutto's life, from her return to Pakistan in October 2007 to her assassination in December that year. The novel is told largely through the perspective of Ali Sikandar, a young television journalist from a feudal Sindhi family who becomes drawn into political activism amid Bhutto's return and the unrest of the Pervez Musharraf period.

== Synopsis ==
The novel follows Ali Sikandar, a 25-year-old television journalist in Karachi, whose personal life is shaped by his family's feudal background and his troubled relationship with his father. When Bhutto returns from exile in October 2007, Ali is assigned to cover her arrival and the political turmoil surrounding her campaign. As the state cracks down on the media and civil society during Musharraf's emergency rule, Ali becomes increasingly involved in protest politics and in a pro-democracy activist movement.

Alongside the present-day plot, Shah inserts historical passages dealing with Sindhi saints, colonial history, and Ali's ancestral ties to older structures of land, class, and power.

== Reception ==
In Publishers Weekly, the novel was described as a "spirited" work steeped in Sindhi heritage and culture, and the review called it "fascinating and eye-opening".

Reviewing the book in Dawn, Madeline Amelia Clements wrote that it was a more expansive and compositionally ambitious work than Shah's earlier fiction. She argued that the novel sought to understand both the historical power structures of Sindh and the magnetism of modern politician-poets such as Bhutto, although she also suggested that its historical range sometimes sat unevenly with the contemporary narrative.

In the Toronto Review of Books, the novel was described as an ambitious and captivating work, as much a love letter to Sindh as a political novel. The review praised Shah's handling of class, history, and Karachi's social detail, while noting that some minor plot elements in the present-day narrative seemed underdeveloped.

The book was also reviewed by the Library Journal.
