= Shiva Rahbaran =

Iranian writer

Shiva Rahbaran (born November 28, 1970) is an Iranian writer and researcher.

== Life ==
Shiva Rahbaran was born in Tehran, and was eight years old when the Shah was exiled in 1979. She and her family left Iran for Germany in 1984. She studied literature and political science at the Heinrich Heine University Düsseldorf, before completing a PhD supervised by Christopher Butler at Oxford University, on the writer Nicholas Mosley. The study was later published by Dalkey Archive Press.

After living in Munich and Zürich for twelve years, Rahbaran moved to London in 2013.

Shiva Rahbaran is a contributor to BBC Persian, BBC World and Iran International.

Her short story 'Massoumeh' won the 2016 Wasafiri New Writing Prize.

== Works ==
- The paradox of freedom: a study of Nicholas Mosley's intellectual development in his novels and other writings. Rochester : Dalkey Archive Press, 2006. ISBN 978-1-564-78488-9
- Nicholas Mosley's Life and Art: A Biography in Six Interviews (Dalkey Archive Scholarly), 2009 ISBN 978-1-564-78564-0
- Iranian writers uncensored: freedom, democracy, and the Word in contemporary Iran. Champaign: Dalkey Archive Press, 2012. ISBN 978-1-564-78688-3
- Rahbaran, Shiva (2015). Iranian Cinema Uncensored: Contemporary Film-makers since the Islamic Revolution. I.B. Tauris. p. 289. ISBN 978-1-784-53418-9.
- 'Massoumeh: An Iranian Family in Times of Revolution'. Wasafiri, Vol. 32, Issue 1 (2017), pp. 74–76.
