= Olúmìdé Pópóọlá =

Nigerian-German writer

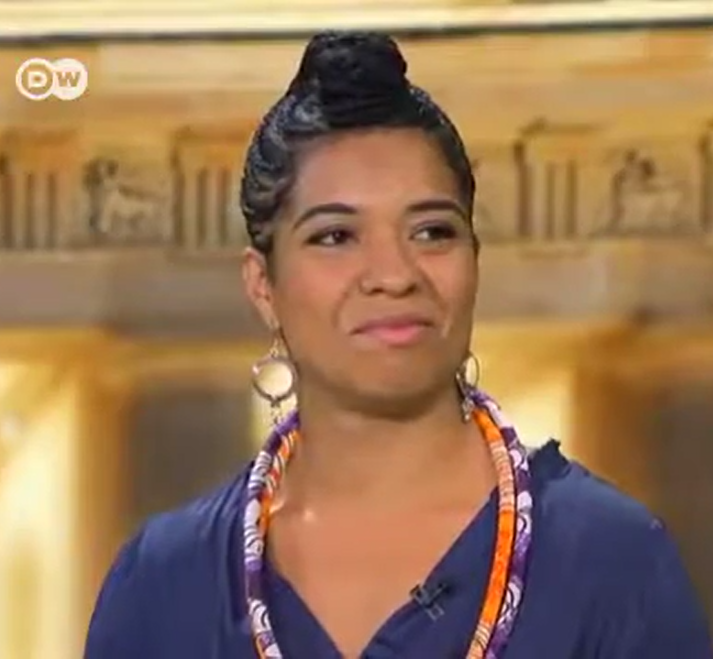
- Pópóọlá during an interview at Deutsche Welle TV in 2017.
- Born: Olúmìdé Pópóọlá; Germany
- Occupations: Novelist, poet
- Website: https://olumidepopoola.com/

Olúmìdé Pópóọlá is a London-based Nigerian-German writer, speaker and performer. Her latest novel When We Speak of Nothing was published in July 2017, by Cassava Republic Press.

== Biography and work ==
Pópóọlá was born in Germany to a German mother and a Nigerian father. She moved to Nigeria as a toddler and spent five years there before returning to Germany. She holds a PhD in Creative Writing, a MA in Creative Writing and a BSc in Ayurvedic Medicine.

=== Writing ===
Her publications include essays, poetry, and prose. While writing, she gets her inspiration from the people that surround her. She exclaims that she is "...interested in the small, hidden away stories" and uses those stories to bring underrepresented groups to the foreground.

Her novella This is Not About Sadness was published by Unrast in 2010. She has also written a play, Also by Mail, which was published by Edition Assemblage in 2013. In 2016, she co-authored with Annie Holmes a short collection entitled Breach (Peirene Press).

In a 2017 interview with the Nigerian Guardian, Pópóọlá reflects on her decision to become a writer. She confesses that she "...was a child with a wild and rich imagination... when [she] realized that you could construct stories, put them together yourself, [she] knew that that is what [she] wanted to do also."

She is a contributor to the 2019 anthology New Daughters of Africa, edited by Margaret Busby.

=== Other creative work ===
In 2013 Pópóọlá was featured in German bassist Edward Maclean's song "Still", in his album Edward Maclean's Adoqué.

In 2018 Pópóọlá curated the African Book Festival Berlin, which focused on the themes of transnationalism and migration.

Pópóọlá is the project leader of Futures in the Making, an organization that provides writing workshop lessons for LGBTQ+ youth.

== Also by Mail ==
Pópóọlá's play Also by Mail revolves around a divided family in Nigeria, specifically Nigerian German siblings Wale and Funke, coming together to mourn their father's death. While the adults in the family become fixated on the father's will, the youths struggle to find their voice. This story deals with themes such as racism, cultural and generational differences, loss, and greed. Marion Kraft, the author of The African Continuum and African American Women Writers, describes how, in writing this play, Pópóọlá is "poignantly and authentically representing the lives, the diversity, the struggles and aspirations of people in the Black diaspora, their quest for identity and justice."

Brian Chikwava, author of Harare North, refers to Also by Mail as "… a slick and captivatingly contemporary Afro-European tale that, like jazz, is also rooted in the folkloric things that animate people."

== When We Speak of Nothing ==
Pópóọlá's novel When We Speak of Nothing (Cassava Republic Press, 2017) tells a story of two young black boys in London whose friendship gets tested over several challenges that include sexual and queer identity, racism, bullying, and an unstable political climate. Brittle Paper describes it as a story "built on multiple threads of suspense. The brisk, airy, and youthful language of the novel gives the reader the feeling of having encountered something truly new. But what glues the reader to the page is the lives of two teenagers set adrift against currents of history that threaten to overpower and silence them." BellaNaija calls it a novel that "explores the depths of friendship, racial tensions in a first world country, the complexities of the family unit, and the struggles of growing up as disillusioned adolescents" and "a beautiful story that reflects the volatile nature of the times."

British novelist Diana Evans in a review in The Financial Times describes When We Speak of Nothing as a "satisfying and perceptive examination of the emergence of the whole person against the odds posed by a constricting society."

== Bibliography ==
- this is not about sadness, Unrast Verlag, 2010, ISBN 978-3897716025
- Also By Mail, Edition Assemblage, 2013, ISBN 978-3942885386
- With Annie Holmes, Breach, Peirene Press, 2016, ISBN 978-1908670328
- When We Speak of Nothing, Cassava Republic Press, 2017, ISBN 978-1911115458

== Awards ==
In 2004 Pópóọlá won the May Ayim Award for Poetry.
