= Peepal Tree Press =

British publisher of Caribbean and Black British writing

- Type: Privately held company
- Industry: Book Publishing
- Founded: 1985; 41 years ago
- Founder: Jeremy Poynting
- Headquarters: Leeds, Yorkshire, England
- Key people: Jeremy Poynting, Hannah Bannister, Kwame Dawes, Jacob Ross, Dorothea Smartt, Kadija Sesay, Adam Lowe
- Number of employees: 2 full-time, 10 part-time or freelance
- Website: www.peepaltreepress.com

Peepal Tree Press is a publisher based in Leeds, England, which publishes Caribbean, Black British, and South Asian fiction, non-fiction, poetry, drama and academic books. Poet Kwame Dawes has said: "Peepal Tree Press's position as the leading publisher of Caribbean literature, and especially of Caribbean poetry, is unassailable."

Peepal Tree publishes around 20 books a year, mainly from the Caribbean and its diasporas. Caribbean Beat magazine has called it a "publishing lifeline" for Caribbean writers. In the UK, the press is noted for its success with literary prizes, its international readership, and its role in supporting and publishing Black British and British Asian writers.

== Overview ==
Peepal Tree Press was first conceived in 1984, after a paper shortage in Guyana halted production of new books in the region. It was officially founded in 1985, and was named after the sacred peepal trees transplanted to the Caribbean with Indian indentured labourers, after founder Jeremy Poynting heard a story of workers gathering under the tree to tell stories. The Guyana Chronicle has said, "Peepal Tree Press is responsible, in a major way, for the burgeoning of Guyanese literature".

The press is based in Yorkshire, part of the growing independent publishing sector outside London, at 17 King's Avenue, in a residential part of Burley, "a rundown, multicultural part of Leeds". Its work is part-funded by Arts Council England and was included in their 2011, 2014, 2018 and 2023 National Portfolios (prior to this, the company was a Regularly Funded Organisation from 2006). Peepal Tree was initially one of only two publishers of primarily Black-interest titles funded by the Arts Council.

Peepal Tree Press has published more than 450 titles, and maintains a commitment to keeping them in print. The focus of Peepal Tree Press is "on what George Lamming calls the Caribbean nation, wherever it is in the world", though the company is also concerned with Black British writing and South Asian writers of British or Caribbean descent. The list features new writers and established voices, as well as posthumous work from Caribbean writers such as Mahadai Das, Neville Dawes, Anthony McNeill, and Gordon Rohlehr. The press' stated approach is to publish (and republish) "Not best sellers, but long sellers". This remit includes translations of French, Spanish and Dutch Caribbean writers, as well as English-language writers.

Peepal Tree Press has published, in various forms, such writers as Roger Robinson, Bernardine Evaristo, Anthony Kellman, Kwame Dawes, Christian Campbell, Jacob Ross, Kei Miller, Christine Craig, Opal Palmer Adisa, Angela Barry, Ishion Hutchinson, Dorothea Smartt, Alecia McKenzie, Una Marson, Shivanee Ramlochan, Jack Mapanje, Patience Agbabi, Linton Kwesi Johnson, Daljit Nagra, Grace Nichols, Lemn Sissay, John Agard, Vahni Anthony Ezekiel Capildeo, Raymond Antrobus, Keith Jarrett, Rishi Dastidar, Gemma Weekes, Pete Kalu, Maggie Harris, Courttia Newland, Jackie Kay, Jan Lowe Shinebourne, and Kamau Brathwaite. It is a core member of the Northern Fiction Alliance—alongside Comma Press in Manchester, Dead Ink in Liverpool and And Other Stories in Sheffield—which aims to raise the profile of UK publishing outside of London and in the North of England.

== History ==
After World War II, UK publishers such as Heinemann, Longman and Faber developed various English-language African, Caribbean and Asian writers series. In 1970, James Currey and Heinemann Educational Books (HEB) launched the Caribbean Writers Series to republish notable Caribbean writers, modelled on its earlier African Writers Series (1957) and Writing in Asia Series (1966). The UK was often considered better placed to sell to places such as the Caribbean because of its "ex-colonial" profile. These were academic lists, and so the books were often expected to be representative of a nation or culture.

=== 1960s–1980s ===
In the mid-1960s, Leeds had a literary scene that attracted writers from around the world. During this period, Peepal Tree Press's founder Jeremy Poynting befriended Kenyan writer Ngũgĩ wa Thiong'o at the University of Leeds, who inspired his interest in Caribbean literature. At that point a lecturer in further education and a trade unionist, this friendship led Poynting to pursue a PhD in Caribbean literature at the University of Leeds. He first visited the Caribbean in 1976 as part of his research.

In the 1970s, Poynting was a frequent visitor at New Beacon Books, run by John La Rose and Sarah White. La Rose and White were also involved in the Caribbean Artists Movement (CAM) and organised the International Book Fair of Radical Black and Third World Books with Jessica Huntley of Bogle-L'Ouverture Publications. According to Gail Low, these organisations blurred the boundaries between book shop, publisher and community activism, which was common among the grassroots publishing collectives of the 1970s and '80s. During this time, Poynting would also become a regular contributor to Wasafiri. These relationships would, Poynting says, lay the foundation and inspiration for what would become Peepal Tree Press.

By the 1980s, the Caribbean titles published in the UK were already at risk, as marketing to overseas audiences was considered unprofitable. Heinemann, for instance, was acquired by British Tyre & Rubber, which sold its Social Sciences list to Gower Press in Aldershot. Gower Press subsequently cancelled the Caribbean World Series in 1984.

That same year, while visiting Guyana, Poynting saw local writer Rooplall Monar acting out some of his stories in the ruins of the Lusignan sugar estate. Forbes Burnham's authoritarian regime had led to a paper shortage in the country, so publishing opportunities in Guyana were slim. When Monar despaired that they would never see print, Poynting decided to publish the stories back in the UK.

In 1985, Poynting printed Monar's Backdam People at Thomas Danby College, where he worked. Though publishers such as Heinemann and Longman had moved away from Caribbean books, this first title nevertheless sold out its modest print run of 400 copies at the International Book Fair of Radical Black and Third World Books.

The name chosen for the new press was intended both as a pun (as a homophone for "people") and as a symbol of the diaspora. It is named for the holy bodhi tree, brought as seeds by indentured Hindu workers to the Caribbean, where it became nativised. The tree thus represents something dispersed that sets down roots in a new location. At the time, Indians in some parts of the Caribbean were also politically and socially marginalised, so the name was also a political reminder of the Caribbean's diversity.

=== 1990s ===
With the help of his son, Poynting moved production to his home garage, using a second-hand Rotaprint offset printer held together with an elastic band and a folding machine paid for with an Arts Council grant (in their 1991/2 funding cycle). Sales were largely via mail order, book fairs and independent bookshops (such as New Beacon) in the UK and Caribbean, but prices were low and the quality of books remained high. Despite one local Caribbean bookseller leaving the region with her unpaid debts, the press was able to continue. Eventually Poynting moved operations to a property at 17 King's Avenue in Burley.

After the Arts Council offered him a subsequent development grant in their 1992/3 funding cycle, Poynting went part-time in his job at Thomas Danby, producing books with the remainder of his week. Peepal Tree also received a grant from the Centre for Research in Asian Migration at the University of Warwick (CRAM). To subsidise the literary publishing, Poynting took on commercial print jobs.

In 1994, Hannah Bannister joined the company, initially as an intern, helping to expand the business and becoming its Operations Manager. The press published two notable debut poetry collections that year: Bernardine Evaristo's Island of Abraham and Kwame Dawes' Progeny of Air.

Kwame Dawes had submitted to the press without seeing any of its books, based on the recommendation of Edward Baugh. Although Dawes' Resisting the Anomie was written and contracted first, Peepal Tree's small list, team of two, and on-site printer meant they could produce Progeny of Air faster than Fredericton could publish Dawes' first book. Dawes was pleased with how thorough Poynting's editing was and his commitment to publishing Caribbean writers, not just Caribbean books. He decided to work with Peepal Tree for his future books.

In 1995, a small group of business-minded friends and supporters, including Caribbean poets Ian McDonald and Ralph Thompson, helped turn the press into a limited company.

In 1996, Peepal Tree published writer and school teacher Beryl Gilroy's In Praise of Love and Children, which she had written in the 1960s but had struggled to get published. The press would go on to publish all her subsequent work. It was only around this time that Poynting quit his lecturer position and became Managing Editor full-time.

=== 2000s ===
In 2004, Peepal Tree Press launched its Inscribe programme to widen the press' "adaptive development services" for writers of African and Asian heritage in the UK. Dr Kadija George and Dorothea Smartt were hired to lead the programme.

In 2006, Peepal Tree became one of the Arts Council's Regularly Funded Organisations. With an increased budget, Kwame Dawes came on board as a guest editor.

In 2009, the press launched the Caribbean Modern Classics Series, which restores to print important books from the 1950s onwards, such as Edgar Mittelholzer's My Bones and My Flute, George Lamming's Water with Berries, Una Marson's Selected Poems and Seepersad Naipaul's Gurudeva and Other Indian Tales.

=== 2010s ===
By 2010, due to advances in digital printing, the press was able to completely cease its print activities and focus more on its editorial and publishing work. To support this expanded work, Kwame Dawes took a permanent role as associate poetry editor, while novelist Jacob Ross joined the press as associate fiction editor. Poet Adam Lowe also joined the press, on an Arts Council placement, handling social media and publicity. Echoing Dawes' relationship with the press, though in reverse, both Ross and Lowe would also go on to be published by Peepal Tree.

Since expanding, Peepal Tree has been involved in a number of partnerships. These include partnering with the Geraldine Connor Foundation on Windrush learning resources; the Leeds Soroptimists and Ilkley Literature Festival for the SI Leeds Literary Prize; and Akashic Books, the Bocas LitFest, the Commonwealth Foundation and the British Council on CaribLit; and Comma Press, And Other Stories and Dead Ink on the Northern Fiction Alliance (NFA).

In 2015, the University of the West Indies (Mona) awarded Jeremy Poynting an honorary D. Litt. for services to Caribbean letters. In 2016, Bocas LitFest in Trinidad presented him with the Henry Swanzy Award. In 2018, he was elected as a fellow to the Royal Society of Literature.

=== 2020s ===
In 2020, Peepal Tree published academic Corinne Fowler's Green Unpleasant Land, which was selected by Bernardine Evaristo as an Observer Best Books 2021. The book was the target of a negative campaign by the Conservative Party's Common Sense Group and Restore Trust for exploring connections between the British countryside and the empire. This was part of a wider campaign against the National Trust's Colonial Countryside project. Dominic Davies of City, University of London, described the campaign as an "hysterical reaction" that nevertheless validated the book's central argument.

In 2020 and 2021, Peepal Tree authors won several notable awards, including the T. S. Eliot Prize and Ondaatje Prize (both for Roger Robinson's A Portable Paradise) and the Costa Prize (for Monique Roffey's The Mermaid of Black Conch).

== Impact ==
Today, Peepal Tree continues to produce books in the UK for the Caribbean market, because of the challenges involved in producing and distributing the books within the region. Jeremy Poynting has said that Caribbean writers are less likely to be published, so they remain his priority. Peepal Tree has also republished many out-of-print Caribbean books from the 1950s onwards as part of its Caribbean Modern Classics series. Most of these books were only available second-hand at collectors' prices, if at all.

Peepal Tree has also been credited with supporting writers in the Caribbean at a time when other presses and institutions did not, including helping to establish a regional press in Trinidad for Caribbean writers, along with Akashic Books, called Peekash Press. Peekash is administered locally by Bocas LitFest.

According to Aliyah Ryhaan Khan, Peepal Tree is especially important in platforming Indo-Caribbean literature:

The press is dedicated to the re-issuing, preservation, and growth of Caribbean and Black British literature, with a specific and unique interest in Indo-Caribbean literature. It would not be remiss to say that most—not all, Shani Mootoo and other Canadian-Caribbean authors have other avenues open to them—Indo-Caribbean fiction and poetry that gains an international audience outside of the Caribbean does so through the efforts of this press.

Al Creighton, in Stabroek News, also points out the Peepal Tree has republished one of very few modern works depicting the Indigenous heritage of Guyana in Couvade: A Dream Play of Guyana by Michael Gilkes. In Indigenous Guyanese culture, couvade is a traditional ritual in which a man experiences sympathetic pregnancy alongside his partner. Beryl Gilroy's Inkle and Yarico, which also portrays Indigenous Caribbeans, was shortlisted for the 1996 Guyana Prize for Fiction.

Peepal Tree also aims to support Black British writing in the broader sense, including British Asian writers. The Free Verse Report (London: Spread the Word, 2005) noted that Peepal Tree was one of only a few presses who consistently published Black and Asian poets in Britain. More recently, Leeds City Council's The Literary North report noted Peepal Tree's contribution of "40 years of innovative publishing" in the city. Peepal Tree describes itself as curating and preserving these literatures, saying, "We provide a welcoming home for Caribbean and Black British writing [...] our writers regard Peepal Tree as a family open to multiple ideas about what being Black means."

In The Guardian, Danuta Kean notes that a willingness to publish authors dropped by bigger publishers, and focus on developing authors rather than books, has likely benefited small presses such as Peepal Tree Press, and allowed them to increase their readership. Being able to produce smaller print runs while having lower overheads also allows them to take more risks. Bethan Evans notes that Peepal Tree Press often takes more risks when it comes to form and subject matter than do bigger publishers.

Peepal Tree has published the debuts of authors such as Kwame Dawes, Kevin Jared Hosain and Bernardine Evaristo. Kevin Jared Hosain, Kwame Dawes and others have spoken about the value of working with Peepal Tree, who can dedicate more time to an individual writer and will support a writer throughout their career. Reflecting on the editing she received at indie presses, author Desiree Reynolds said that they "still do the heavy lifting big publishers fail to". She said she particularly appreciated the mentoring and editing process at Peepal Tree:

I believe my experience with Peepal Tree Press was unique because I got access to care and to support and to a real concern about the writing. I don't know if new authors always get that kind of time. It made me feel worthy, at least in that small moment sat in the office [...] The experience of being edited I took as a masterclass of how to edit. I carry those lessons with me every day.

Jamaican poet Ishion Hutchinson said of the press:

I have been fortunate to have my first effort handled by an entity committed to only quality writing from the Caribbean. That agenda alone is cherishable and exists only at Peepal Tree Press, and that is one main reason any ambitious young poet from the region should, after breaking head and heart over his manuscript, pray Peepal Tree picks it up. You will realize immediately, however, that though Caribbean identity and Caribbeanness command a great deal of what Peepal Tree is about, you have entered into a broad-reaching, serious international organ.

=== Awards ===
In 1994, Kwame Dawes' Progeny of Air won the Forward First Book Prize. He was the first poet of colour to win the prize.

In 2010, Christian Campbell's Running the Dusk won the 2010 Aldeburgh First Collection Prize. It was also a finalist for both the Cave Canem Prize and the Forward Poetry Prize for the Best First Collection.

In 2011, 2/3 poetry and 3/6 fiction finalists for the 2010 Guyana Prize for Literature were published by Peepal Tree; the press won the poetry category. The same year, 4/6 poetry finalists and 3/5 fiction finalists in the Guyana Prize's wider Caribbean Award were published by the press — Peepal Tree titles won in both categories. As a result, the Guyana Chronicle named Peepal Tree as the "unannounced winner" of the awards, noting also that 35 Peepal Tree titles had made the shortlist since the Guyana Prize's inauguration in 1987, with 14 winners published by the press.

In 2017, Jacob Ross won the inaugural Jhalak Prize for his novel, The Bone Readers. In 2022, it was also selected as part of the Big Jubilee Read programme, celebrating the Platinum Jubilee of Elizabeth II with books by 70 writers from across the Commonwealth. In 2018, The Bookseller noted that independent presses, including Peepal Tree, "dominated" on that year's Jhalak Prize list.

In 2020, Roger Robinson's A Portable Paradise won the 2019 T.S. Eliot Prize and Ondaatje Prize.

In 2021, Monique Roffey's The Mermaid of Black Conch won the 2020 Costa Novel and Book of the Year Awards. It was shortlisted for the Goldsmiths Prize, the Rathbones Folio Award and The Republic of Consciousness Prize for Small Presses; and longlisted for the Orwell Prize for Political Fiction. The book is inspired by Taíno mythology and the African water spirit Mami Wata.

In 2023, Mslexia noted that indie presses, including Northern indies such as Peepal Tree and Carcanet, dominated the prize lists once again.

Peepal Tree and its titles have also won the Casa de la Américas Literary Award, the Clarissa Luard Award for innovation in publishing, the OCM Bocas Prize for Caribbean Literature, and the Felix Dennis Best First Collection Prize.

=== CaribLit and Peekash Press ===
As part of the CaribLit project, Peepal Tree Press and Akashic Books established a joint imprint, Peekash Press, in 2014. This saw the publication of Pepperpot: Best New Stories from the Caribbean, an anthology of the Caribbean entries to the 2013 Commonwealth Short Story Prize, published simultaneously by Akashic in North America and Peepal Tree in the UK and Caribbean. This was followed by two more joint publications: Coming Up Hot: Eight New Poets from the Caribbean in 2015; and New Worlds, Old Ways: Speculative Tales from the Caribbean, edited by Karen Lord, in 2016.

Recognising the continued dearth of publishers in the Caribbean, Peekash was created to embed a local publishing house within the region, drawing upon the resources and expertise of Akashic in Brooklyn, NY, and Peepal Tree in Leeds, UK. To fulfil this mission, editorial control and the daily operation of Peekash was transferred to the originators of the CaribLit project, Bocas LitFest, in 2017.

=== HopeRoad Publishing ===
On 1 February 2024, Peepal Tree announced that it was partnering with HopeRoad Publishing, widening the press's focus from the Caribbean and Britain to cover Asia and Africa as well. HopeRoad was set up in 2010 by Rosemarie Hudson, who was joined by Pete Ayrton (founder of Serpent's Tail) in 2019. Ayrton handles the Small Axes imprint, reissuing "post-colonial classics" that were previously out of print. HopeRoad will select and edit its own books, while Peepal Tree handles production and distribution.

Peepal Tree's slogan changed from "Home of the Best in Caribbean and Black British Writing" to "Decolonising bookshelves since 1985".

=== Inscribe ===
Peepal Tree Press is also recognised for Inscribe (and Young Inscribe), an imprint and writer development project that supports emerging writers of African and Asian descent in the UK. Founded in 2004, it is run by co-directors Kadija George and Dorothea Smartt, and has supported such writers such as Khadijah Ibrahiim, Desiree Reynolds, Seni Seneviratne, and Rommi Smith. Young Inscribe supports emerging writers in Yorkshire aged 18–30, and has previously mentored writers such as Samatar Elmi, Adam Lowe, and Zodwa Nyoni, among others.

Though it started as a Yorkshire-based project, Inscribe expanded to become national in 2015. Iy continues to operate a readers and writers group for local writers in Leeds, however, coordinated by Khadijah Ibrahiim. In 2021, the Inscribe Readers & Writers Group published an anthology, Weighted Words, edited by Jacob Ross. Inscribe's work in Leeds has resulted in many Peepal Tree writers being recognised for their work.

The Inscribe imprint, under Series Editor Kadija Sesay (pen name of Kadija George), publishes anthologies of contemporary Black British and British Asian writing, such as Red: Contemporary Black British Poetry (edited by Kwame Dawes), Closure: Contemporary Black British Short Stories (edited by Jacob Ross), Filigree: Contemporary Black British Poetry (edited by Nii Ayikwei Parkes) and Glimpse: An Anthology of Black British Speculative Fiction (edited by Leone Ross). It also publishes chapbooks and pamphlets of Black British writers, including Sai Murray, Degna Stone, and Maya Chowdhry.

=== New Caribbean Voices ===
In November 2017, Peepal Tree Press was awarded the Clarissa Luard Award for Independent Publishers, with plans announced to use the £10,000 prize money for a podcast project, New Caribbean Voices (inspired by the BBC World Service's Caribbean Voices radio show).

The podcast launched in 2019, hosted by the British Guyanese-Grenadian poet Malika Booker and produced by Melody Triumph. The first episode featured Barbara Jenkins reading from her debut novel De Rightest Place, Shivanee Ramlochan reviewing Caribbean books, and music by Chris Campbell.

=== SI Leeds Literary Prize ===
Peepal Tree Press is a founding core partner in the SI Leeds Literary Prize for unpublished fiction written by Black and Asian women resident in the UK, along with the Leeds chapter of Soroptimist International (SI) and the Ilkley Literature Festival. The prize launched in 2012 and is biennial.

The press also published the prize's inaugural winner, Minoli Salgado and her novel A Little Dust on the Eyes, in 2014. The book was later shortlisted for the DSC Prize for South Asian Literature. Kit de Waal was shortlisted for the second biannual SI Leeds Literary Prize, in 2014.

In November 2023, Peepal Tree published The Unheard Stories, edited by Saima Mir. It is an anthology of essays by SI writers, judges, and patrons, announced to celebrate 10 years of the prize.
