= International Graphoanalysis Society =

American organization for handwriting analysis

International Graphanalysis Society, Inc.
- Company type: Private
- Industry: Hobbies
- Founded: Kansas City, Missouri 1949
- Headquarters: New Kensington, PA
- Key people: Milton M Bunker, Founder; Greg Greco, CEO
- Products: Graphology courses and material
- Number of employees: less than 5
- Website: http://www.igas.com/

The International Graphoanalysis Society is an American based association specializing in handwriting analysis. The organization is far more commonly referred to by its initials, IGAS, than the full name.

IGAS traces its beginnings back to 1929, when Milton N. Bunker formed The American Grapho Analysis Society. The company has seen an ownership change many times since it was founded. Around 1957, that organization was replaced by The International Graphoanalysis Society, which was run by V. Peter Ferrara. Upon V. Peter Ferrara's death, ownership of the company fell to his daughter, Kathleen Kusta because her brother, Peter Ferrara, had recently argued with his father and thus was written out of the will. This left control of the company to Kusta. Peter Ferrara was assigned to oversee their publishing company, Nelson-Hall Publishers Both companies shared office space in Chicago. In June 2003, Kathleen Kusta sold most of the assets of IGAS by private auction to Greg Greco.

From the early seventies through the early eighties, the organization put energy into graphological research, the most important being Crumbaugh & Stockholm (1977) and Stockholm (1980), (1983).

== Members ==
IGAS is a privately held corporation. As such, information about its finances, membership numbers, actual number of graduates, and related items can not be independently verified. The masthead of its publicationThe Journal of Graphoanalysis lists the organization's current claimed statistical data.

IGAS has roughly 30 chapters, covering the United States, parts of Canada, the UK, and South Africa.

The highest reported membership number, which was issued to a student of Graphoanalysis was just over 50,000. There are no reliable figures on the number of students at any specific time. Both the number of dues paying members, and the number of students are believed to have peaked during the late seventies. This was just before IGASHQ started the wholesale purging of members and chapters.

== The Courses ==
Eight Basic Steps in Graphoanalysis is the beginning course that many members teach people interested in handwriting analysis.

The General Course of Graphoanalysis is the course taught by IGAS. Graduates of that course are awarded the designation Certified Graphoanalysts, more commonly referred to as CGA.

Graduates of The Advanced Course of Graphoanalysis are awarded the designation of Master Graphoanalyst or MGA.

Attendees of the annual Congress are awarded Three Year Study Certificates, or Six Year Study Certificates, upon attending the Congress the appropriate number of times.

The monthly study packet is a four-page lesson that challenges members to improve their ability to analyze handwriting. Beginning in the early-90s, the monthly study packet was incorporated into the IGAS's monthly journal publication.

== The Dissenters ==
Because of the tight control that IGAS had on its members, the field of handwriting analysis is functionally divided into two groups—Graphoanalysts, and Graphologists.

A clause that was responsible for the expulsion of hundreds of members of IGAS between 1970 and 1990 was: Further, I will not affiliate with any group of handwriting analysts not sanctioned by the International Graphoanalysis Society, Inc., the last clause of the 1980 Code of Ethics of IGAS.'

In 1957, Charlie Cole set up a series of graphology lectures, which evolved into The American Handwriting Analysis Foundation. The lectures were intended for graduates of the MGA program only. Klara G. Roman gave the first series of lectures. Later lectures were given by other Holistic Graphologers. As a result of that study, Charlie Cole, and most of the people that attended that lecture series, were expelled from IGAS.

Handwriting Analysts of Minnesota was another group that was started as a direct result of the entire chapter being expelled for the unethical conduct of having a Holistic Graphologer lecture at their quarterly meeting.

The list of people who were thus expelled goes on and on. The net result of this is that the majority of currently active organizations of handwriting analysts in the United States were formed due to this wall of separation that IGAS required its members to keep.

== See also ==
- Graphoanalysis
- Graphology
- Handwriting Analysis

== Reference Texts ==
Crumbaugh, James C & Stockholm, Emilie (1977)
Validation of Graphoanalysis by 'Global' or 'Holistic' Method.
Perceptual And Motor Skills
April 1977, 44(2), 403–410.

Stockholm, Emilie (1980)
Statistical Data For Basic Traits of Graphoanalysis: IGAS Trait Norm Project.
Perceptual and Motor Skills, 1980, 51, 220-222

Stockholm, Emilie (1983)
Research Department releases findings of new reliability study
Journal of Graphoanalysis , December 1983, 3-4

== Graphology journals ==
The Canadian Analyst published by Alex Sjoberg documented most of the history of both The American Grapho Analysis Society, and IGAS. Prior its demise, it was the longest running graphological periodical in North America.

"The Grapho Analyst" was published by IGAS from 1940 to 1962. The Journal of Graphoanalysis was published by IGAS, from 1962 to 2003. Publication of the IGAS Journal has been published from 2004 to present.

== For Further Research ==
"https://openlibrary.org/publishers/Nelson-Hall_Publishers"

Handwriting Analysis Research Library Greenfield, MA. Appointments are required to visit the library.
