= Kerry Young (author) =

British writer (born 1955)

- Born: 1955 (age 70–71); Kingston, Jamaica
- Occupation: Novelist
- Notable work: Pao (2011); Gloria (2013); Show Me a Mountain (2016)
- Website: www.kerryyoung.co.uk

Kerry Young (born 1955) is a British writer, born in Jamaica. She is the author of three well received and interlinked novels: Pao (2011), Gloria (2013) and Show Me a Mountain (2016).

== Biography ==
Young was born in Kingston, Jamaica, to a Chinese father and a mother of mixed Chinese-African heritage, and migrated to England in 1965, when she was 10 years old.

Young holds master's degrees in organization development and creative writing, in addition to a PhD in youth work. She worked in the youth service in the UK and wrote extensively in this field, undertaking research, training and consultancy for central government departments, local authorities, voluntary organisations, charities, universities and public bodies.

=== Writing and reception ===
Young took up fiction while still a full-time youth work consultant, beginning her first novel, Pao, in 2003. Eventually published in 2011 by Bloomsbury, Pao was shortlisted for the Costa First Novel Award, the East Midlands Book Award and the Commonwealth Book Prize. The story is told in the voice of the book's Chinese-Jamaican main protagonist, Pao, and as described by Stevie Davies in The Guardian, "Kerry Young's heartfelt, sparky and affecting debut novel is a chronicle of multicultural Jamaica, both in its cultural richness and in its strife and tensions. The first-person narrator, writing in a version of local patois, is of Chinese descent, belonging to a community of Chinese immigrants that began in the mid 19th century and came to be resented by black inhabitants in proportion to its business success. ...Young's is a narrative of confusion and conflict, both in the political world and within the self. ...The complexity of Jamaican society in Pao is fascinating and bewildering." For James Urquhart in The Independent, "Kerry Young's energetic debut novel is a pacy but absorbing saga of domestic struggle and gangland manoeuvring set against the violent backdrop of postwar Jamaican politics." Writing in The Observer Ian Thomson stated that Pao "confirms Young as a gifted new writer. Her novel is a blindingly good read in parts, both for its mesmeric story-telling and the quality of its prose."

Young's next two novels were also, like Pao, set in mid-20th-century Jamaica "against a backdrop of social change and political upheaval, telling three people's interlinked stories of struggle and redemption, love and ambition, race, class, gender and colour in a country at a crossroads." Kirkus Reviews characterized Young's second novel, Gloria (2013), as "Not quite a love story and not quite a feminist bouquet, but a well-seasoned hybrid" and the Northern Echo review concluded: "Gloria is a brilliant, observant, sometimes complex read, but with clear and simple messages, it speaks to the feminist and equal rights campaigner in all of us." Gloria was nominated for the International IMPAC Dublin Literary Award, shortlisted for the East Midlands Book Award, longlisted for the OCM Bocas Prize for Caribbean Literature. Show Me a Mountain (2016) was summed up by the Historical Novel Society as "Highly recommended, shocking, complex and riveting historical fiction!"

As stated on the British Council website: "Her fiction has been praised for combining family history, deep research and the expressive power of patois. By doing so, it brings the global realities of Chinese identity to life. And she celebrates the underappreciated impact of Chinese culture on the modern Caribbean, making a powerful case for a new understanding of Jamaican urban life." She has said that she sees herself as an inheritor of the works of "other hyphenated Chinese writers such as Maxine Hong Kingston and Han Suyin", and she counts among her other influences William Faulkner, Toni Morrison and Hermann Hesse, also naming: "My most important philosophical influence, Aristotle. My most important spiritual influence, Thich Nhat Hanh. My most important personal influence, my mother." Young was quoted in a 2013 interview as saying: "My PhD, which focused on values and ethics in youth work, and my commitment as a practising Buddhist are reflections of my preoccupation with virtue and what it means to be wholesome and have a wholesome life. So when you put all those interests together you get a perspective that is historical, political, social and personal."

=== Other literary work ===
Young has been a judge for several literary awards, including the Jhalak Prize, the SI Leeds Literary Prize, and the Bridport Prize, as well as a manuscript assessment reader for The Literary Consultancy and a tutor for the Arvon Foundation.

== Honours, appointments and recognition ==
Appointed a Fellow on the Royal Literary Fund Fellowship Programme, Young was writer-in-residence at the University of Sheffield (2014–16). She also teaches creative writing as an Honorary Assistant Professor in the School of English at the University of Nottingham, and is an Honorary Creative Writing Fellow at the University of Leicester.

Young has been listed as one of "11 Notable Jamaican Writers You Should Know", alongside Claude McKay, Roger Mais, Andrew Salkey, Sylvia Wynter, Lorna Goodison, Lindsay Barrett, Margaret Cezair-Thompson, Colin Channer, Kei Miller, and Marlon James.

== Selected bibliography ==
- The Art of Youth Work, 2nd edition Russell House Publishing, 2006
- Pao, Bloomsbury, 2011
- Gloria, Bloomsbury, 2013
- Show Me a Mountain, Bloomsbury, 2016
- "Home Is Where the Heart Is", in Hometown Tales: Midlands, W&N, 2018
- "Tomorrow Is Another Day", in Wasafiri, Issue 100 (Winter 2019)
