= College for Distributive Trades =

Technical training college in London, England

The College for the Distributive Trades was a technical training college in London. It was founded as the Westminster Day Continuation School in 1921. In 1986 it was one of the seven London art colleges which became part of the new London Institute, the others being Camberwell School of Arts and Crafts, the Central School of Art and Design, Chelsea School of Art, the London College of Fashion, the London College of Printing and Saint Martin's School of Art. In 1990 the college was merged with the London College of Printing to form the London College of Printing and Distributive Trades, which in 1996 changed its name to London College of Printing and in 2003 was renamed the London College of Communication.
