= Harare North =

2009 novel by Brian Chikwava

Harare North is a novel by the Zimbabwean author Brian Chikwava, 2004 winner of the Caine Prize for African Writing. The novel was published in London by Jonathan Cape in 2009. A French translation was published by Editions Zoe in 2011.

== Title ==
After a decade of emigration, Zimbabweans now refer to London as Harare North. The novel being political, the title alludes to the relocation of power from Zimbabwe's capital, Harare, along with the exodus of Zimbabweans, and the "colonisation" of London by Zimbabweans.

== Plot summary ==
The story is set in London, England. The nameless narrator is a former militia member who became caught up in the in-fighting between the Zimbabwean police and the Green Bombers, the notorious militia, and had to flee Zimbabwe when he is charged with murder. He seeks political asylum in the UK but is planning to make the equivalent of US$5,000 in London and fly back to Zimbabwe, because he is sure that with that kind of money he can buy his way out of the criminal justice process. His struggle to raise the money sees him resorting to low-paid jobs in the underbelly of London, but he also takes advantage of Shingi, his friend and squat-mate, and blackmails his cousin's wife when he discovers that she is having an affair.

The struggle intensifies as the narrator realises that he has to return to Zimbabwe as soon as possible for a ceremonial ritual for his deceased mother. His mother's grave, in a rural village, may soon be destroyed by the Zimbabwean government, which is evicting the villagers to roll in mining operations since valuable minerals have been discovered there. With events becoming increasingly fractious, the story reaches its dénouement when the narrator's mind begins to unravel and, simultaneously, he and Shingi become a single entity.

== Awards and nominations ==
Harare North was longlisted for the 2010 Orwell Prize for political writing.
