= Zurab Karumidze =

Georgian writer and culturologist (1957–2023)

Zurab Karumidze ზურაბ ქარუმიძე
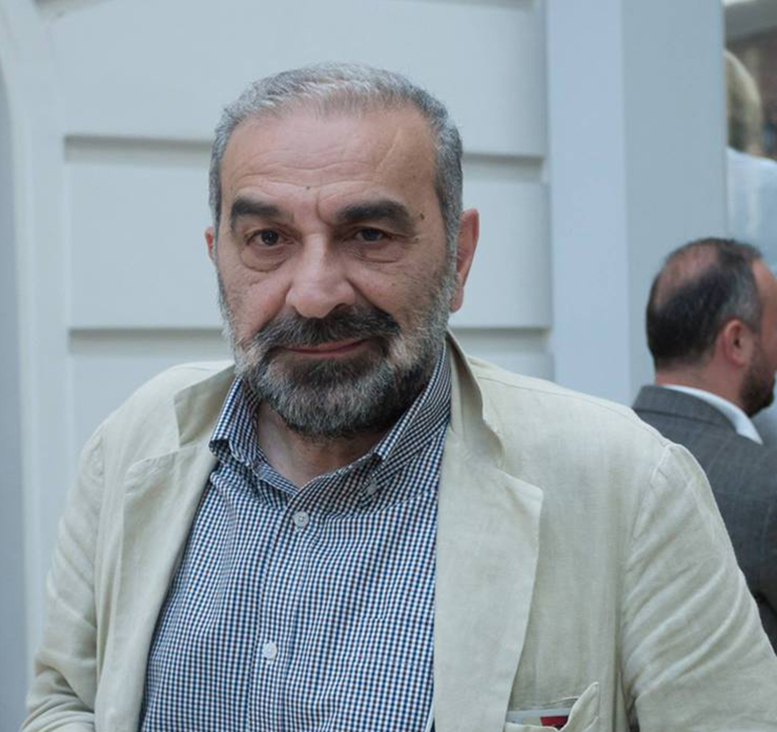
- Karumidze in 2016
- Born: 22 August 1957; Tbilisi, Georgian SSR, USSR
- Died: 12 December 2023 (aged 66)
- Occupations: Writer, Culturologist
- Writing career
- Notable work: Dagny, or a Love Feast (2011)
- Literary movement: Postmodernism, Metamodernism

Zurab Karumidze (22 August 1957 – December 2023) was a Georgian writer and culturologist. He graduated from Ivane Javakhishvili Tbilisi State University, the faculty of Western European languages and literature with a major in English literature.

== Information ==
Zurab Karumidze, born in 1957, studied English language and literature at Tbilisi State University, where he wrote a dissertation on John Donne. For several years he was a research associate at the Centre for Twentieth Century Literary Studies at Tbilisi State University.

From 1994 to 1995, he was a Fulbright Scholar at the University of Wisconsin-Milwaukee, working on postmodern American metafiction. Two of his short stories were published in English in Clockwatch Review (Bloomington IL 1996).

Karumidze was appointed editor of the Tbilisi-based English-language literary magazines Georgia/Caucasus Profile (1995–2000) and Caucasus Context (2002–2005).

Karumidze was the author of a collection of short stories entitled 'Opera' (1998) and of several novels, including 'The Wine-dark Sea' (2000) and 'Gigo and the Goat' (2003). He co-edited 'Enough! Rose Revolution in the Republic of Georgia' (Nova Science Publishers, New York 2005) and had written numerous essays on philosophy, cultural history, collective memory and folk tales, as well as an award-winning book on the history of jazz (2010). His literary works are highly intellectual and experimental as well as being full of references and allusions to Western literature.

Karumidze died in December 2023, at the age of 66. His son, Levan Karumidze, is a member of parliament as of 2020.

== Books ==
- Opera, a collection of short stories (1988)
- Wine Dark Sea, a novel (2000)
- Goat and Gigo, a novel (2003)
- Dagny, or a Love Feast, a novel in English language (2011)
- Life of Jazz, documentary prose (2009)
- Caucasian Foxtrot (2011)
- Bashi-Achuki or Moby Dick (2013)
- Jazzmine (2014)
- Untergang: Travel to Europe (2018)
- Belacqua (2022)

=== Translations ===
- Dagny, or a Love Feast, in English language, Dalkey Archive Press (2013)
- Dagny oder Ein Fest der Liebe, in German, Weidle Verlag, 2017, ISBN 978-3-938803-85-1

=== Awards ===
- Literary Award "Saba" in the nomination "The Best Criticism, Essayistic and Documentary Prose of the Year" for the book "Life of Jazz" (2010)
