= Andrea Stuart =

Barbadian-British historian and writer (born 1962)

- Born: 1962 (age 63–64); Jamaica
- Education: University of East Anglia; Sorbonne
- Occupations: Historian and writer
- Notable work: The Rose of Martinique: A Biography of Napoleon's Josephine (2003); Sugar in the Blood: A Family’s Story of Slavery and Empire (2011)
- Awards: Enid McLeod Literary Prize (2004)

Andrea Stuart (born 1962) is a Barbadian-British historian and writer, who was raised in the Caribbean and the UK and now lives in the UK. Her biography of Josephine Bonaparte, entitled The Rose of Martinique, won the Enid McLeod Literary Prize in 2004. Although her three published books so far have been non-fiction, she has spoken of working on a novel set in the 18th century.

== Early years ==
Born in Jamaica, of Barbadian parents, Andrea Stuart spent many of her early years there, where her father was Dean of the medical school at the University College of the West Indies. She moved to England with her family when she was 14, in 1976. She studied English at the University of East Anglia and French at the Sorbonne. She began working as a journalist, then branched into publishing and television documentary production.

== Writing ==
Stuart's first book was Showgirls (London: Jonathan Cape, 1996), a collective biography of showgirls through history to the present day, from Colette, to Marlene Dietrich, to Josephine Baker, to Madonna. It was adapted into a two-part documentary for the Discovery Channel in 1998, and since then has inspired a stage show, a dance piece and a number of burlesque performances.

In 2003, Stuart's second book, The Rose of Martinique: A Biography of Napoleon's Josephine, was published. Described by Kirkus Reviews as "unfailingly interesting", and by The Washington Post as "a comprehensive and truly empathetic biography", it won the Enid McLeod Literary Prize in 2004 and has been translated into several languages.

Stuart's most recent book, Sugar in the Blood: A Family’s Story of Slavery and Empire, was published by Portobello Books in 2012, to much acclaim. It tells the story of slavery and colonialism in the Caribbean from the perspective of what Stuart learned about her own family's experience through seven generations from the 17th century. Amy Wilentz wrote in The New York Times: "In this multigenerational, minutely researched history, Stuart teases out these connections. She sets out to understand her family’s genealogy, hoping to explain the mysteries that often surround Caribbean family histories and to elucidate more important cultural and historic themes and events: the psychological aftereffects of slavery and the long relationship between sugar — 'white gold' — and forced labor.... Much of the fiery magic of this book arises from Stuart’s ability to knit together her imaginative speculations with family research, secondary sources and the work of historians of the region, including C. L. R. James and Adam Hochschild....There is not a single boring page in this book." Publishers Weekly referred to Stuart "Brilliantly weaving together threads of family history, political history, social history, and agricultural history into a vivid quilt covering the evolution of sugar—"white gold"—and slavery and sugar's impact on the development of Barbados as well as on her own family." Valerie Grove in The Times said: "A riveting story of family, slavery and the sugar trade…[Stuart belongs] in the canon of fine post-colonial writers." The Guardian′s reviewer described the book as "a diligently researched hybrid of family memoir and history ... absorbing". Margaret Busby in The Independent referred to it as "a magisterial work of history".

Stuart's work has appeared in numerous newspapers, magazines, and anthologies (including 2019's New Daughters of Africa, edited by Margaret Busby), and Stuart has been co-editor of Black Film Bulletin and fiction editor of Critical Quarterly.

=== Awards and recognition ===
In 2004, Stuart won the Enid McLeod Literary Prize from the Franco-British Society for The Rose of Martinique: A Biography of Napoleon's Josephine.

Sugar in the Blood was shortlisted for the 2013 OCM Bocas Prize in the non-fiction category and for the Spear's Book Award, and was The Boston Globe′s non-fiction book of 2013.

In June 2014, Stuart was named by Ebony magazine as one of "six Caribbean writers you should take some time to discover" (alongside Mervyn Morris, Beverley East, Ann-Margaret Lim, Roland Watson-Grant, and Tiphanie Yanique, who were attending the Calabash Literary Festival in Jamaica). She was elected a Fellow of the Royal Society of Literature in 2014.

== Teaching and lecturing ==
Stuart has taught at Kingston University, as a Writer-in-Residence since 2011, and on the Biography course at the Arvon Foundation. She was also a writing tutor with the Faber Academy, directing the "Writing Family History" course, and has been associate lecturer in cultural studies at the University of the Arts London, visiting lecturer in creative writing at City University London, and in cultural studies at Central Saint Martins.

== Publications ==
=== Books ===
- Showgirls. London: Jonathan Cape, 1996 (ISBN 978-0224036153)
- The Rose of Martinique: A Biography of Napoleon's Josephine. Macmillan (1st edition), 2003 (ISBN 978-0333739334). Reprint Grove Press / Atlantic Monthly Press, 2005 (ISBN 978-0802142023)
- Sugar in the Blood: A Family’s Story of Slavery and Empire. London: Portobello Books, 2012. USA: Knopf Publishing Group, 2013.

=== Selected articles ===
- "The Pirate's Daughter, by Margaret Cezair-Thompson", The Independent, 23 November 2007.
- "Strange Music, by Laura Fish – The poet, the plantation and history's lost lines", The Independent, 8 August 2008.
- "A Mercy, By Toni Morrison", The Independent, 7 November 2008.
- "The Dead Yard, By Ian Thomson; From Harvey River, By Lorna Goodison", The Independent, 22 May 2009.
- "Sugar: a bittersweet history, by Elizabeth Abbott", The Independent, 1 January 2010.
- "The Long Song, By Andrea Levy", The Independent, 5 February 2010.
- "The Sugar Barons: Family, Corruption, Empire and War, By Matthew Parker", The Independent, 6 May 2011.
- "Book of a Lifetime: Collected Poems, by Derek Walcott", The Independent, 30 June 2012.
- "Britain Needs to Confront its Past", The Big Issue, 18 July 2012.
- "A bitter-sweet heritage", The Guardian, 1 September 2012.
- "Book review: Flappers: Six Women of a Dangerous Generation, By Judith Mackrell", The Independent, 26 July 2013.
- "Black History Month can only be declared a success once it's redundant", The Guardian, 31 October 2013.
- "Belle shows that at last, cinema is catching up with black history", Comment is free, The Guardian, 12 June 2014.
- "Britain's wealth was built on black backs. Windrush is a scandal of forgetting", The Guardian, 22 May 2018.

== See also ==
- Caribbean poetry
- Caribbean literature
- Postcolonial literature
