= Shivanee Ramlochan =

Trinidadian writer (born 1986)

- Ramlochan in 2022
- Born: 1986 (age 39–40); St. Joseph, Trinidad
- Occupations: Poet, arts reporter and blogger
- Notable work: Everyone Knows I Am a Haunting (2017)
- Website: shivaneeramlochan.com

Shivanee Ramlochan (born 1986) is a Trinidadian poet, arts reporter and blogger. Her first collection of poems Everyone Knows I Am a Haunting was shortlisted for the 2018 Felix Dennis Prize for best first collection.

== Life ==
Shivanee Ramlochan was born in 1986 in St. Joseph, Trinidad. She took part in the Cropper Foundation Residential Workshop for Caribbean Writers in 2010. She has received residencies and grants from Catapult Caribbean Arts, Bread Loaf, and Millay Arts. She is deputy editor of the Caribbean Review of Books and book review editor for Caribbean Beat magazine. She is part of the team that runs the NGC Bocas Lit Fest. She writes for the festival and for Paper Based Bookshop, Trinidad and Tobago's oldest bookshop.

Since 2010, she has also written about books for her personal blog Novel Niche, providing "Queer & Transgressive Close Readings from the Ungovernable & Dangerous Margins".

== Writings ==
Her work has been published in the Caribbean Review of Books, tongues of the ocean, and Draconian Switch.

Several of her poems featured in the anthology Coming Up Hot: 8 new poets from the Caribbean (Peekash Press, 2015, ISBN 978-1-84523-309-9).

In 2017, she published her first collection of poems Everyone Knows I Am a Haunting with Peepal Tree Press. Reviewing this collection in The Guardian, Sarala Estruch noted: "This astonishing debut gives voice to sufferings and struggles of women, the queer and non-binary, reminiscent of Audre Lorde's call for 'the transformation of silence into language and action'. But what makes this collection truly revelatory is its bold envisioning of a Trinidad – and, beyond that, a world – in which identities and hierarchies of power are fluid rather than fixed. It is a fierce world, ripe with possibility: 'I am the queen / the comeuppance / the hard heretic nature intended.'"

In 2019, Ramlochan collaborated with Bahamian book artist Sonia Farmer on "The Red Thread Cycle", an artist book project using Ramlochan's words and Farmer’s visual design that was on display at the National Art Gallery of the Bahamas.

Ramlochan has cited Jean Rhys, Vahni Capildeo, and Gaiutra Bahadur as influences. Ramlochan has also noted her "creative community with Douen Islands, an artistic performance collective founded by Trinidadians, poet Andre Bagoo and graphic designer Kriston Chen".

Ramlochan's second book Unkillable is forthcoming in 2023 from Noemi Press as part of the Infidel Poetics series.

== Awards and recognition ==
In 2012, Ramlochan was shortlisted for the Small Axe Literary Competition for Poetry, and in 2014 she won second prize in the same competition for "The Red Thread Cycle", from her debut collection. In 2013, she was selected as one of three New Talent Showcase writers at the NGC Bocas Lit Fest. She was shortlisted for the 2015 Hollick Arvon Caribbean Writers Prize. In 2018, her first collection of poems, Everyone Knows I Am a Haunting, was shortlisted for the Felix Dennis Prize for best first collection. In the same year, she was shortlisted for the Bridport Poetry Prize, was a finalist for the People's Choice T&T Book of the Year, and was shortlisted for Forward Arts Foundation's best first collection prize.

== Bibliography ==
Collections

- Everyone Knows I Am a Haunting (Peepal Tree Press, 2017, ISBN 978-1-84523-363-1)

Poems

- "Good Names for Three Children" (tongues of the ocean, July 2011)
- "Kalah" (tongues of the ocean, August 2011)
- "I See That Lilith Hath Been With Thee Again" (Caribbean Review of Books, Issue 30, November 2013)
- "The Abortionist's Daughter Declares Her Love" (Caribbean Review of Books, Issue 30, November 2013)
- "the night I fucked the border patrol agent" (Poetry, July/August 2019)
