= Brian Chikwava =

Zimbabwean writer and musician

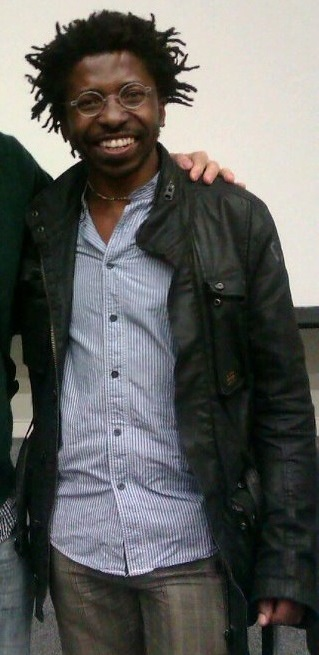
- Brian Chikwava after a reading in NUI Maynooth.
- Born: Victoria Falls, Zimbabwe
- Education: Bristol University
- Occupations: Writer and musician
- Writing career
- Notable awards: (2004) Caine Prize

Brian Chikwava is a Zimbabwean writer and musician. His short story "Seventh Street Alchemy" was awarded the 2004 Caine Prize for African writing in English; Chikwava became the first Zimbabwean to do so. He has been a Charles Pick fellow at the University of East Anglia, and lives in London. He continues to write in England and put out an album titled Jacaranda Skits.

== Background ==
Brian Chikwava was born in Victoria Falls, Zimbabwe, in 1971. He went to boarding-school in Bulawayo, going on to study civil engineering at Bristol University. He settled in London in 2004.

== Writing ==
Chikwava won the fifth Caine Prize for African Writing in 2004 with his short story "Seventh Street Alchemy" (which was published in Writing Still, Weaver Press, Harare, 2003), the first Zimbabwean to win the prize. Making the award, the chair of the judges, Alvaro Ribeiro, described the story as: "A very strong narrative in which Brian Chikwava of Zimbabwe claims the English language as his own, and English with African characteristics.... A triumph for the long tradition of Zimbabwe writing in the face of Zimbabwe’s uncertain future!"

His first novel Harare North was published in 2009 through Jonathan Cape. Reviews were generally positive, with Mary Fitzgerald of the New Statesman writing that "in bringing to life the plight of those often marginalised by mainstream society, [Chikwava] has opened up a bleak, yet urgently important, social landscape". She also praises his "wit and suggestiveness", something that Tod Wodicka, author of All Shall Be Well, agrees with, writing that "page by page, line by line, [Chikwava] has created a perfectly original and true narrative voice...full of surprises, delicious little tics, and real fire-in-the-belly creativity...but importantly, the voice comes off as effortless, and therefore true… it’s a major accomplishment".

Trevor Lewis of The Sunday Times wrote that "Chikwava has created a compelling protagonist, whose back-to-front English and spiky argot throw up sly, acidly comic observations", while Margaret Busby wrote in The Independent: "Chikwava has the talent to find lightness and comedy in the darkest desperation, drawing humour even out of wretchedness...occasionally among novelists one comes across a voice so distinctive...that it grips in an unforgettable way. For me, Chikwava looks set to be in that category. From first page to last, the vernacular narrative of Harare North is arresting, haunting, exciting, funny."

Speaking about Zimbabwe and the reception he believed his book would receive, Chikwava said: "the Zimbabwe I knew no longer exists. The book will be published there but no one will buy it. No one buys books now. They are no longer a priority".

He also took part in the Bush Theatre's 2011 project Sixty Six Books for which he wrote a piece based upon a book of the King James Bible.

Chikwava's second novel, Shamiso, will be published in 2026.
