= Romesh Gunesekera =

Sri Lankan-born British author

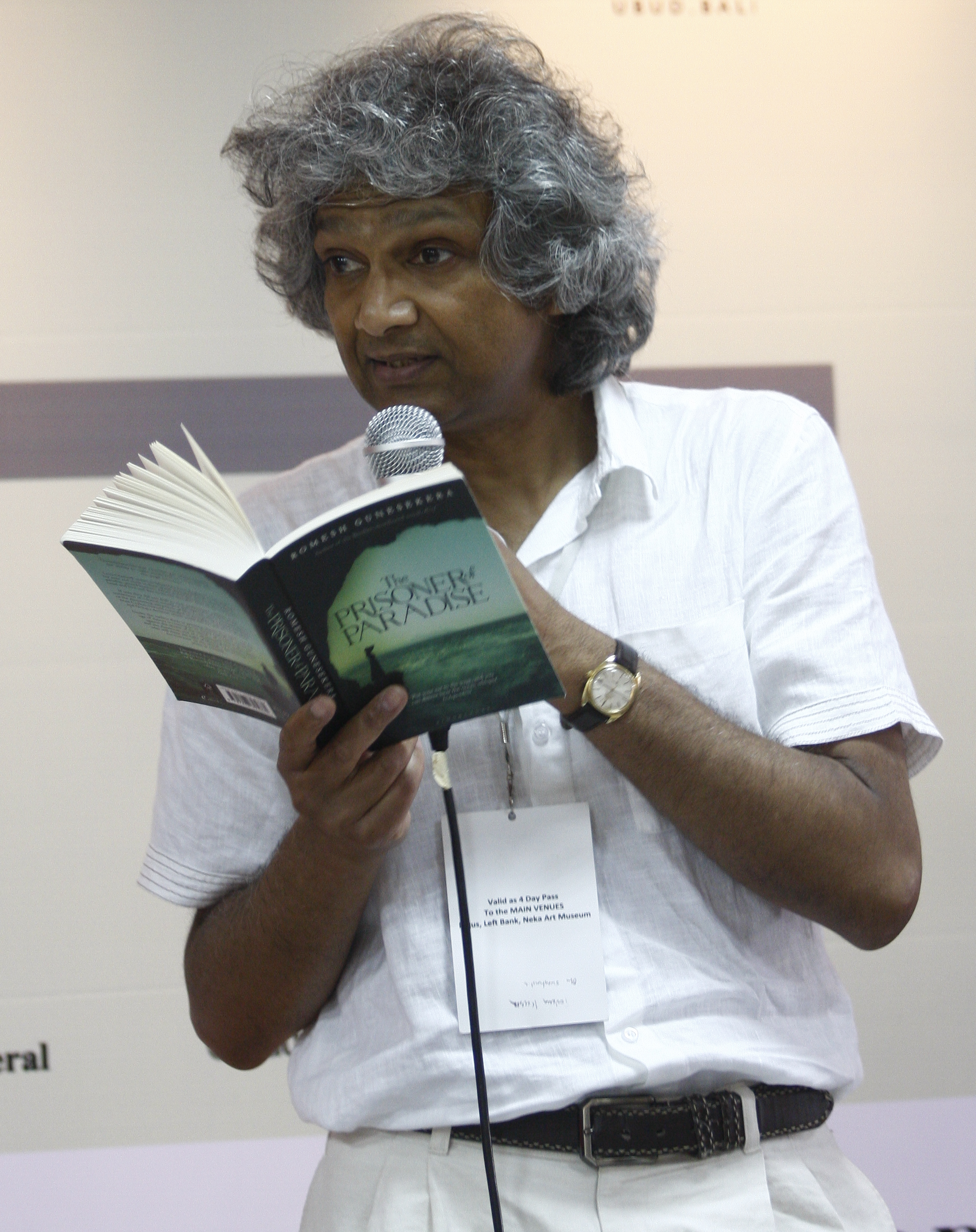
- Romesh Gunesekera at the Ubud Writers and Readers Festival 2012
- Born: August 1954; Colombo, Sri Lanka
- Occupation: Novelist
- Writing career
- Notable works: Reef (1994); The Match (2006)
- Notable awards: Fellow of the Royal Society of Literature UK, Sri Lanka Ranjana National Honour

Romesh Gunesekera FRSL (born 1954) is a Sri Lankan-born British author, who was shortlisted for the Booker Prize for his novel Reef in 1994. He has judged a number of literary prizes and was Chair of the judges of Commonwealth Short Story Prize competition for 2015.

== Life and work ==
Born in Colombo to a Sinhalese Christian family in 1954, Romesh Gunesekera grew up in Sri Lanka and the Philippines, where his father was a founder of the Asian Development Bank, and moved to England in 1971 and currently lives in London. His first book, Monkfish Moon, a collection of short stories reflecting the ethnic and political tensions that have threatened Sri Lanka since independence in 1948, was published in 1992, and was shortlisted for several prizes and named a New York Times Notable Book for 1993. His 1994 novel Reef was shortlisted for the Booker Prize. In 1998, he received the inaugural BBC Asia Award for Achievement in Writing & Literature for his novel The Sandglass. The previous year he was awarded one of the prestigious Italian literary prizes: the Premio Mondello Five Continents. In 1995 he won the Yorkshire Post Best First Work Award in Britain. He is the author of six novels and two short story collections.In 2008, a collection of his Madeira stories were published in a bilingual edition to celebrate its 500th anniversary of the founding of Funchal in Madeira.

His only work of non-fiction is a guide for aspiring writers, entitled Novel Writing, which he co-authored with A.L Kennedy. His most recent novel is Suncatcher, published by Bloomsbury in the UK.

His novel The Prisoner of Paradise has been adapted into a major 531391 picture, entitled Ambleside (2025), directed by Mitch Jenkins.

Gunesekera travels widely for festivals, workshops and British Council tours. He is a member of the Advisory Board of the Asia House Festival of Asian Literature. He is currently one of the writers-in-residence for the charity First Story. He also has a short story related to the theme of animal poaching.

He was a judge for a number of literary prizes, such as the Caine Prize for African Writing, the David Cohen Prize for Literature, the Forward Prize for Poetry and most recently the Granta 2013 list of the Best of Young British Novelists.

He chaired the board of judges of the 2015 Commonwealth Short Story Prize competition. He was also a judge for the International Booker prize in 2024 and the Gratiaen Prize for Sri Lankan fiction which he chaired in 2023.

He has been a Guest Director at the Cheltenham Festival, an Associate Tutor at Goldsmiths College and on the Board of the Arvon Foundation. For four years, until 2013, he was on the Council of the Royal Society of Literature.

Romesh Gunesekera is an elected Fellow of the Royal Society of Literature, and has also received a National Honour in Sri Lanka. Sri Lanka Ranjana.

He is married with two daughters.

== Bibliography ==
=== Books ===
- Gunesekera, Romesh (1992). Monkfish Moon. New Press. ISBN 9781565840775.
- Reef – 1994
- The Sandglass – 1998
- Heaven's Edge – 2002
- The Match – 2006
- The Prisoner of Paradise – 2012
- Noon Tide Toll – 2013
- Suncatcher – 2019

=== Short fiction ===
Title	Year	First published	Reprinted/collected	Notes
Roadkill	2013	Gunesekera, Romesh (2 December 2013). "Roadkill". The New Yorker. Vol. 89, no. 39. pp. 62–65.		

== Awards ==
- Asian Achievers Award for services to media, arts and culture 2015
- Sri Lanka Ranjana 2005
- Fellow of the Royal Society of Literature 2004
- BBC Asia Award 1998 for Achievement in Writing & Literature
- Winner Premio Mondello Five Continents Asia Prize 1997 (Reef)
- Winner of Yorkshire Post First Work Prize 1995 (for Reef)
- Finalist Booker Prize 1994 (Reef)
- Finalist Guardian Fiction Prize 1994 (for Reef)
- Finalist Commonwealth Writers' Regional Prize 1993 (for Monkfish Moon)
- Finalist David Higham Prize 1992 (for Monkfish Moon)
- Arts Council Writers' Bursary 1991
- First prize in the Peterloo Open Poetry Competition in 1988
- The Rathborne Prize in Philosophy 1976
- Liverpool College Poetry Prize 1972
