= Daughters of Africa =

1992 anthology edited by Margaret Busby

- UK 1st edition (hardback). Photograph by Suzanne Roden featuring Sibusiso Nozipho Mavolwane (1958–2015)
- Editor: Margaret Busby
- Language: English
- Genre: Anthology
- Publication date: 1992
- Publication place: UK
- Media type: Print
- Pages: 1127 pp.
- Followed by: New Daughters of Africa

Daughters of Africa: An International Anthology of Words and Writings by Women of African Descent from the Ancient Egyptian to the Present is a compilation of orature and literature by more than 200 women from Africa and the African diaspora, edited and introduced by Margaret Busby, who compared the process of assembling the volume to "trying to catch a flowing river in a calabash".

First published in 1992, in London by Jonathan Cape (having been commissioned by Candida Lacey, formerly of Pandora Press and later publisher of Myriad Editions), and in New York by Pantheon Books, Daughters of Africa is regarded as a pioneering work, covering a variety of genres – including fiction, essays, poetry, drama, memoirs and children's writing – and more than 1000 pages in extent. Following Busby's Introduction – which opens with the Gwendolyn Brooks poem "To Black Women" – the book is arranged chronologically, beginning with traditional oral poetry, and it includes work translated from African languages as well as from Dutch, French, German, Portuguese, Russian and Spanish.

The anthology's title derives from an 1831 declaration by Maria W. Stewart (1803–1880), the first African-American woman to give public lectures, in which she said: "O, ye daughters of Africa, awake! awake! arise! no longer sleep nor slumber, but distinguish yourselves. Show forth to the world that ye are endowed with noble and exalted faculties." (Note: "The Daughters of Africa" is also the name of a club movement started by Lillian Tshabalala and others in South Africa in the 1920s and '30s, inspired by Nokutela Dube, the first South African women to found a school, and modelled on the African-American women's club movement.)

A companion volume called New Daughters of Africa – with the subtitle "An International Anthology of Writing by Women of African Descent", and featuring a further 200-plus contributors from around the world born between the 1790s and the 1990s – was published in 2019. Associated with the anthology is the Margaret Busby New Daughters of Africa Award for a woman student from Africa.

== Reception ==
Daughters of Africa was widely praised on publication. As described by Bernardine Evaristo in The Guardian in June 2020: "Bringing together fiction, poetry, memoir and essays, both books are an incredible introduction to black women's writing from around the world, and feature every established name you can imagine, as well those who deserve to be better known."

Reviewing the anthology for Black British newspaper The Weekly Journal, Evie Arup wrote: "Daughters of Africa is a literary first. Never before has the work of women of African descent world-wide been gathered together in one volume. The breadth of this collection is startling.... This book should be required reading for any student of literature, and a standard reference book in school libraries, and, to paraphrase that well known slogan, 'every home should have one.'"

A reviewer from The Independent observed: "This book may seem to be about literature but in the end it is as much a testament to language: its power to create attitudes as well as its potency as a means of expression." Described by The Observer as a "glorious fat anthology that makes a history out of a selection, and puts an unsung group of people on the map", according to Library Journal, it is "an invaluable text for courses on women writers and writers of African descent", and Keneth Kinnamon in Callaloo saw it as "impressive", noting: "Brief headnotes and long bibliographies enhance the value of this important volume."

Lorna Sage in the Independent on Sunday concluded that "Daughters of Africa has a paradoxical universality", while The Washington Post Book World called it: "A magnificent starting place for any reader interested in becoming part of the collective enterprise of discovering and uncovering the silent, forgotten, and underrated voices of black women." The reviewer for Black Enterprise wrote: "It is a landmark anthology.... Busby's first-of-a-kind anthology is a poignant reminder of how vast and varied the body of black women's writing is." It has also been called "groundbreaking in its presentation and exposure of the work of female African writers", "one of the most significant assemblages of writers across the diaspora" and "the ultimate reference guide to the writing of 'daughters of Africa'".

The Times Literary Supplement review by Maya Jaggi stated: "With rare exceptions, anthologies of black writing and of women's writing have given the impression that there was very little literary endeavour by black women before the 1980s. Margaret Busby's impressive and imaginative selection of 'words and writings', Daughters of Africa, finally destroys that misconception, while tracing continuities within a tradition of women's writing, deriving from Africa yet stretching across continents and centuries."

Jaggi goes on to say: "Some writings (such as those by ancient Egyptian or Ethiopian queens) have been selected primarily for their historical significance, or to celebrate little-known landmarks of achievement. Most, however, have been chosen for their literary qualities, making the anthology a source of continual pleasure and surprise. (...) The cumulative power of this monumental and absorbing anthology stems from the clarity and vibrancy of the voices it assembles. While effectively dismissing the equation of oppression with 'voicelessness', it restores marginalized or isolated writers to the centre of their own rich, resilient and truly international tradition."

The anthology was included in Sacred Fire: "QBR" 100 Essential Black Books, which said:

"Daughters of Africa is a monumental achievement because it is the most comprehensive international anthology of oral and written literature by women of African descent ever attempted. (...) The success of the collection is that it clearly illustrates why all women of African descent are connected by showing how closely related are the obstacles, the chasms of cultural indifference, and the disheartening racial and sexual dilemmas they faced. In so doing, the collection captures the range of their singular and combined accomplishments. Daughters of Africa's accomplishment lies in its glorious portrayal of the richness and magnitude of the spiritual well from which we've all drawn inspiration and to where we've all gone for sustenance, and as such, it is a stunning literary masterpiece."

The anthology was on the Royal African Society's list of "50 Books By African Women That Everyone Should Read", was named by Ms Afropolitan as one of "7 non-fiction books African feminists should read", features regularly on many required-reading lists, and, although now out of print, in the words of Kinna Likimani: "It remains the ultimate guide to women writers of African descent."

== Contributors ==
More than 200 women are featured in Daughters of Africa, including:

- Opal Palmer Adisa
- Abena Adomako
- Ama Ata Aidoo
- Grace Akello
- Zaynab Alkali
- Ifi Amadiume
- Maya Angelou
- Red Jordan Arobateau
- Iola Ashundie
- Mariama Bâ
- Baba
- Toni Cade Bambara
- Valerie Belgrave
- Gwendolyn B. Bennett
- Louise Bennett
- Julia Berger
- Eulalia Bernard
- Ayse Bircan
- Becky Birtha
- Valerie Bloom
- Marita Bonner
- Dionne Brand
- Jean Binta Breeze
- Virginia Brindis de Salas
- Erna Brodber
- Gwendolyn Brooks
- Barbara Burford
- Annie L. Burton
- Abena Busia
- Dinah Anuli Butler
- Octavia E. Butler
- Joan Cambridge
- Aída Cartagena Portalatín
- Adelaide Casely-Hayford
- Gladys Casely-Hayford
- Marie Chauvet
- Alice Childress
- Michelle Cliff
- Lucille Clifton
- Merle Collins
- Maryse Condé
- Anna Julia Cooper
- J. California Cooper
- Jayne Cortez
- Christine Craig
- Jane Tapsubei Creider
- Tsitsi Dangarembga
- Angela Davis
- Thadious M. Davis
- Noémia de Sousa
- Lucy Delaney
- Nafissatou Diallo
- Rita Dove
- Mabel Dove-Danquah
- Kate Drumgoold
- Alice Dunbar-Nelson
- Zee Edgell
- Angelika Einsenbrandt
- Zilpha Elaw
- Old Elizabeth
- Buchi Emecheta
- Alda do Espírito Santo
- Mari Evans
- Jessie Redmon Fauset
- Charlotte Forten Grimké
- Aline França
- Henrietta Fullor
- Amy Jacques Garvey
- Beryl Gilroy
- Nikki Giovanni
- Vivian Glover
- Marita Golden
- Jewelle Gomez
- Pilar López Gonzales
- Lorna Goodison
- Serena Gordon
- Hattie Gossett
- Rosa Guy
- Lorraine Hansberry
- Frances E. W. Harper
- Hatshepsut
- Iyamide Hazeley
- Bessie Head
- Georgina Herrera
- Saida Herzi
- Merle Hodge
- Billie Holiday
- bell hooks
- Pauline Elizabeth Hopkins
- Amelia Blossom House
- Gloria T. Hull
- Marsha Hunt
- Kristin Hunter
- Zora Neale Hurston
- Noni Jabavu
- Mattie J. Jackson
- Harriet Jacobs
- Carolina Maria de Jesus
- Alice Perry Johnson
- Amryl Johnson
- Georgia Douglas Johnson
- Claudia Jones
- Gayl Jones
- Marion Patrick Jones
- June Jordan
- Jackie Kay
- Kebbedesh
- Caroline Ntšeliseng Khaketla
- Yelena Khanga
- Jamaica Kincaid
- Mwana Kupona
- Ellen Kuzwayo
- Alda Lara
- Nella Larsen
- Andrea Lee
- Audre Lorde
- Elise Johnson McDougald
- Terry McMillan
- Naomi Long Madgett
- Lina Magaia
- Barbara Makhalisa
- Zindzi Mandela
- Paule Marshall
- Una Marson
- Annette M'baye
- Pauline Melville
- Louise Meriwether
- Gcina Mhlope
- Anne Moody
- Mary Monroe
- Pamela Mordecai
- Nancy Morejón
- Toni Morrison
- Mwana Kupona Msham
- Micere Githae Mugo
- Pauli Murray
- Gloria Naylor
- Citeku Ndaaya
- Womi Bright Neal
- Lauretta Ngcobo
- Grace Nichols
- Nisa (!Kung)
- Rebeka Njau
- Flora Nwapa
- Sekai Nzenza
- Grace Ogot
- Molara Ogundipe-Leslie
- May Opitz
- Gabriela Pearse
- Ann Petry
- Marlene Nourbese Philip
- J. J. Phillips
- Ann Plato
- Velma Pollard
- Marsha Prescod
- Mary Prince
- Nancy Prince
- Queen of Sheba
- Christine Qunta
- Joan Riley
- Astrid Roemer
- Carolyn Rodgers
- Marta Rojas
- Lucinda Roy
- Jacqueline Rudet
- Kristina Rungano
- Sandi Russell
- Sonia Sanchez
- Simone Schwarz-Bart
- Mary Seacole
- Mabel Segun
- Olive Senior
- Dulcie September
- Ntozake Shange
- Jenneba Sie Jalloh
- Joyce Sikakane
- Zulu Sofola
- Aminata Sow Fall
- Anne Spencer
- Eintou Pearl Springer
- Maria W. Stewart
- Maud Sulter
- Efua Sutherland
- Véronique Tadjo
- Susie King Taylor
- Lourdes Teodoro
- Mary Church Terrell
- Lucy Terry
- Awa Thiam
- Elean Thomas
- Miriam Tlali
- Sojourner Truth
- Harriet Tubman
- Adaora Lily Ulasi
- Bethany Veney
- Charity Waciuma
- Alice Walker
- Margaret Walker
- Michele Wallace
- Myriam Warner-Vieyra
- Angelina Weld Grimké
- Ida B. Wells
- Dorothy West
- Phillis Wheatley
- Zoe Wicomb
- Sherley Anne Williams
- Harriet E. Wilson
- Sylvia Wynter

=== Editions ===
- Margaret Busby (ed.), Daughters of Africa: An International Anthology of Words and Writings by Women of African Descent from the Ancient Egyptian to the Present. First edition, London: Jonathan Cape, hardback, 1992 (ISBN 978-0224035927), 1089 pages.
- – London: Vintage Books, paperback, 1993 (ISBN 978-0099224211).
- – New York: Pantheon Books, hardback, 1992 (ISBN 978-0679416340).
- – New York: Ballantine/One World Books, paperback, 1994 (ISBN 978-0345382689).

== Influence and legacy ==
The anthology inspired curator Koyo Kouoh to edit a German-language equivalent, Töchter Afrikas, that was published in 1994.

In 2009, Daughters of Africa was named on Wasafiri magazine's list of 25 Most Influential Books from the previous quarter-century.

In November 2017, Wasafiri included a special feature marking the 25th anniversary of the first publication of Daughters of Africa, including an interview with the editor by Ellah Wakatama Allfrey, an article by Candida Lacey and contributions from Ayobami Adebayo, Edwige-Renée Dro, Angela Barry, Goretti Kyomuhendo, Nadifa Mohamed, and Phillippa Yaa de Villiers about the influence of the anthology on them. "Importantly, it was a beacon for every young black woman who dreamed of writing. Phillippa Yaa de Villiers told Busby, 'We were behind the bars of apartheid – we South Africans had been cut off from the beauty and majesty of African thought traditions, and Daughters of Africa was among those works that replenished our starved minds.'"

In March 2019, on BBC Radio 4's Woman's Hour, during an interview alongside Busby, Candice Carty-Williams spoke of first encountering the anthology through her godmother Heidi Safia Mirza, Professor of Race at Goldsmiths, University of London: "...she had [Daughters of Africa] on her shelf. She was my only access point to feminism ... and so her shelves were where I understood my place in the world, and this book always piqued my interest because just to pick it up and see the size of it and to understand that there were so many contributors from the same place as me, that was amazing."

Listing many of the names included in Daughters of Africa, Tom Odhiambo of the University of Nairobi stated: "These writers can be described as the matriarchs of African literature. They pioneered 'African' writing, in which they were not simply writing stories about their families, communities and countries, but they were also writing themselves into the African literary history and African historiography. They claimed space for women storytellers in the written form, and in some sense reclaimed the woman’s role as the creator and carrier of many African societies’ narratives, considering that the traditional storytelling session was a women's domain."

In a May 2022 feature in Elle magazine, Chimamanda Ngozi Adichie chose Daughters of Africa as "The book that...fills me with hope": "because it introduced me to many talented writers that I might not otherwise have read, and it makes me remember, with gratitude, the women who came before me."

In November 2022, Sheila Rowbotham listed Daughters of Africa in The Guardian as one of the books representing her "Top 10 dissenting life stories".

Busby was quoted by Gary Younge as saying: "Until you can no longer count the number of African women writers who have broken through then we’ve still got work to do," prior to the publication of her second anthology.

== New Daughters of Africa: An International Anthology of Writing by Women of African Descent (2019) ==
In December 2017, it was announced that a companion volume, entitled New Daughters of Africa, had been commissioned from Margaret Busby by Myriad Editions. Published on 8 March 2019 and characterised as "a behemoth of thought and reflection, exploring sisterhood, tradition, romance, race and identity – individually, and at large", New Daughters of Africa: An international anthology of writing by women of African descent features a further 200 writers: "The new volume expands on and reinforces the assertions of its predecessor. While including texts from the nineteenth century to the present, the book focuses primarily on writers who have come of age in the decades following Daughters of Africa's publication."

Contributors are arranged according to decade of birth, "to give context to the generational links", as the editor states, and to continue to chart the black feminist literary canon. The anthology contains not only many well-known names but "a host of literary notables of the future". Kevin Le Gendre stated in his review in Echoes magazine that "this inspiring collection punches above its very considerable weight.... The result is great diversity within a supposed minority, a resounding statement of the infinitely rich life experience of the 'sisters' drawn from Africa and the Diaspora. As was the case with the acclaimed first edition there is a commendable balance between those who are known and those who are unknown but nonetheless have illuminating things to say. ... Busby has grouped the texts by decade, reaching right back to the pre-1900, which results in a clear and vivid sense of evolution in both style and subject matter."

Among the contributors to New Daughters of Africa are: Adeola Solanke, Adrienne Kennedy, Afua Hirsch, Agnès Agboton, Aida Edemariam, Aja Monet, Akosua Busia, Ama Biney, Aminatta Forna, Amma Asante, Anaïs Duplan, Andaiye, Andrea Levy, Andrea Rosario-Gborie, Andrea Stuart, Angela Barry, Angela Cobbinah, Anni Domingo, Arthenia Bates Millican, Ayesha Harruna Attah, Ayeta Anne Wangusa, Ayòbámi Adébáyò, Barbara Chase-Riboud, Barbara Jenkins, Beatrice Lamwaka, Bernardine Evaristo, Beverley Bryan, Bonnie Greer, Bridget Minamore, Camille T. Dungy, Candace Allen, Candice Carty-Williams, Carmen Harris, Carolyn Cooper, Catherine Johnson, Celia Sorhaindo, Chibundu Onuzo, Chika Unigwe, Chimamanda Ngozi Adichie, Chinelo Okparanta, Claudia Rankine, Cordelia Ray, Danielle Legros Georges, Deise Faria Nunes, Delia Jarrett-Macauley, Diana Evans, Diana Ferrus, Diane Abbott, Donika Kelly, Donu Kogbara, Doreen Baingana, Dorothea Smartt, Edwidge Danticat, Edwige-Renée Dro, Effie Waller Smith, Elizabeth Keckley, Elizabeth Nunez, Elizabeth Walcott-Hackshaw, Ellah Wakatama Allfrey, Ellen Banda-Aaku, Esi Edugyan, Eve Ewing, Florida Ruffin Ridley, Gabeba Baderoon, Gabrielle Civil, Glaydah Namukasa, Goretti Kyomuhendo, Hannah Azieb Pool, Harriet Anena, Hawa Jande Golakai, Hilda Twongyeirwe, Imbolo Mbue, Irenosen Okojie, Isabella Matambanadzo, Jackee Budesta Batanda, Jacqueline Bishop, Jane Ulysses Grell, Jay Bernard, Jennifer Nansubuga Makumbi, Jennifer Teege, Jesmyn Ward, Joan Anim-Addo, Joanne C. Hillhouse, Josephine St. Pierre Ruffin, Juliana Makuchi Nfah-Abbenyi, Otoniya J. Okot Bitek, Kadija Sesay, Karen Lord, Karen McCarthy Woolf, Ketty Nivyabandi, Kit de Waal, Lebogang Mashile, Leila Aboulela, Leone Ross, Lesley Lokko, Linda Bellos, Lisa Allen-Agostini, Lola Shoneyin, Maaza Mengiste, Makena Onjerika, Makhosazana Xaba, Malika Booker, Malorie Blackman, Margo Jefferson, Marie NDiaye, Marina Salandy-Brown, Marion Bethel, Maxine Beneba Clarke, Meta Davis Cumberbatch, Michelle Yaa Asantewa, Mildred Barya, Minna Salami, Monica Arac de Nyeko, Nadia Davids, Nadifa Mohamed, Nah Dove, Nalo Hopkinson, Namwali Serpell, Nana-Ama Danquah, Nana Asma'u, Nana Ekua Brew-Hammond, Nana Oforiatta Ayim, Naomi Jackson, Natalia Molebatsi, Natasha Trethewey, Nawal El Saadawi, Nikky Finney, Nnedi Okorafor, Nomavenda Mathiane, Noo Saro-Wiwa, Novuyo Rosa Tshuma, Olúmìdé Pópóọlá, Panashe Chigumadzi, Patience Agbabi, Patrice Lawrence, Patricia Cumper, Phillippa Yaa de Villiers, Rachel Eliza Griffiths, Rashidah Ismaili, Rebecca Walker, Reni Eddo-Lodge, Ros Martin, Rosamond S. King, Roxane Gay, Sade Adeniran, Safia Elhillo, Sandra Jackson-Opoku, Sapphire, Sarah Ladipo Manyika, Sarah Parker Remond, Sefi Atta, Simi Bedford, Sisonke Msimang, Stella Dadzie, SuAndi, Sue Woodford-Hollick, Summer Edward, Susan Kiguli, Taiye Selasi, Tanella Boni, Tess Onwueme, Tiphanie Yanique, Trifonia Melibea Obono, Valerie Tagwira, Vangile Gantsho, Verene Shepherd, Verna Wilkins, Wangui wa Goro, Wanjiku wa Ngũgĩ, Warsan Shire, Winsome Pinnock, Yaba Badoe, Yassmin Abdel-Magied, Yemisi Aribisala, Yewande Omotoso, Yolanda Arroyo Pizarro, Yrsa Daley-Ward, Yvonne Adhiambo Owuor, Yvonne Bailey-Smith, Yvonne Denis Rosario, Yvonne Vera, Yvvette Edwards, Zadie Smith, Zandria Robinson, Zena Edwards, Zetta Elliott, Zita Holbourne, Zoe Adjonyoh, Zukiswa Wanner, Zuleica Romay Guerra, and others.

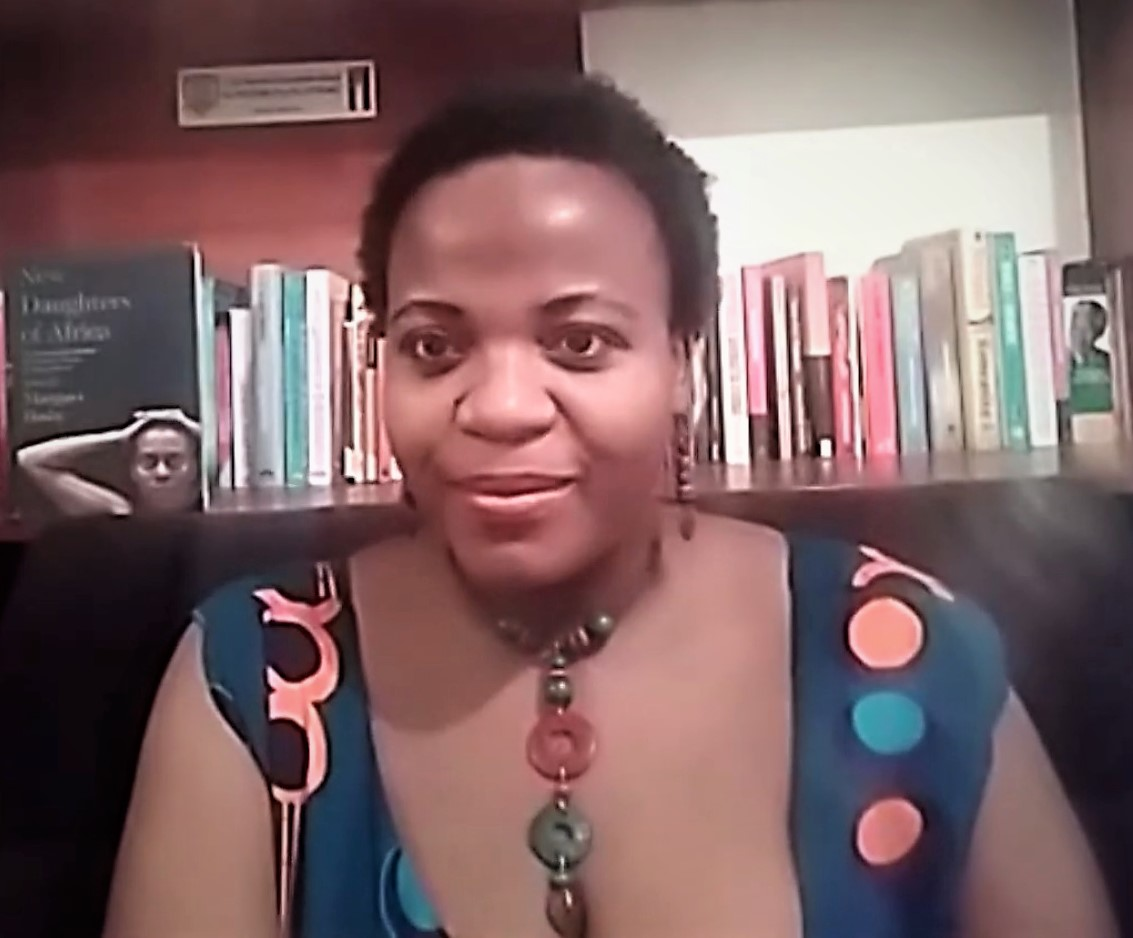
Zukiswa Wanner at a 2020 New Daughters of Africa event

New Daughters of Africa was launched in London at the South Bank Centre on 9 March 2019 at the WOW Festival, and contributors were subsequently featured at many other festivals and venues in the UK and abroad, including at the Wimbledon BookFest, the NGC Bocas Lit Fest in Trinidad, the Bernie Grant Arts Centre, Somerset House, and the British Library.

Editions of the 2019 anthology have also been published in the US by Amistad (HarperCollins) and in South Africa by Jonathan Ball Publishers. In 2022, a new UK paperback edition was published by Penguin Books. In May 2023, a German-language abridgement of the anthology, entitled Neue Töchter Afrikas, featuring 30 of the contributors, was published by Unrast Verlag.

=== Editions ===
- Margaret Busby (ed.), New Daughters of Africa: An International Anthology of Writing by Women of African Descent. First edition, UK: Myriad Editions/New Internationalist Publications, 2019. Hardback ISBN 978-1-912408-00-9); trade paperback ISBN 978-1-912408-01-6).
  - Hamish Hamilton/Penguin Books UK edition, 25 August 2022. Paperback (ISBN 9780241997000).
- – New York, US: Amistad/HarperCollins, ISBN 9780062912985, 1056 pages.
- – Johannesburg, South Africa: Jonathan Ball Publishers, ISBN 9781868429844.

=== Selected review coverage for New Daughters ===
The review in the Irish Times, describing New Daughters of Africa as a "vast and nuanced collection", notes that it is "arranged in order of the women's birth decades, a chronological reminder that African women have been creating art for many centuries; the youngest included are still in their twenties. ... a necessary wealth of work – a welcome addition to any book shelf and a compulsory education for anyone unaware of the countless gifted African women journalists, essayists, poets and speakers who should influence how we see the world." John Stevenson concluded his review in Black History Month magazine by saying: "Every Black home should own a copy of the book. The literary voices of Black women need to be heard even more urgently now."

Imani Perry wrote in the Financial Times: "Anthologies can read as mere assortment or collection. But their function, particularly when well composed – as is the case with this book – can be much more deliberate. Busby's choice to organise the writers by generation, rather than region or date of publication, has a powerful effect. From the 18th century to the present, the location of black women across borders – yet always in the winds of political, economic and social orders – emerges. Questions of freedom, autonomy, family, race and social transformation present themselves in generational waves. Thus, with more than 200 contributors, this anthology is also a social and cultural world history."

The review by in the Kenyan Daily Nation said: "It is the kind of literary compendium that many prospective African women writers need to have today.... New Daughters of Africa: An International Anthology of Writing by Women of African Descent is a collection that the expert on literature, women studies, gender studies, African history; the feminist reader/scholar; or even the general reader will find refreshing considering the scope of the writing, as well as helpful as a reference source."

Paul Burke's review in NB magazine, rating the anthology 5/5, stated: "This is a beautiful, challenging and triumphant collection of writing that increases our understanding of humanity and entertains royally. ...I'm just bowled over by the quality and breadth of contributions here but also the way they coalesce. The writing is, depending on each author's style, sharp, funny, romantic, confrontational and politically astute. This book has a heart and a sense of purpose and I think it's fair to say it is important and so relevant for our times. Anyone interested in Africa, gender politics, good storytelling and writing that pushes the boundaries of the form will love this book. ...This is a full on sensory experience, a stimulation for the brain and for the heart and some of the writing here stirs the blood and twists the gut. ...The depth of psychological, political, economic and cultural insight here is awe inspiring."

It received a five-star review in the San Francisco Book Review, and in the opinion of the reviewer for the New York Journal of Books:

Here is the book so many have been waiting for. The book to make sense of so many others....The topics are just as varied and shine bright lights on the lives of critically underrepresented women of color, and on the contributions of these gifted literary scholars: motherhood, slavery, love, work, immigration, assimilation, friendship, thwarted aspiration, infidelity, racism, marriage, poverty, and on and on.

In fact, the only thing that is not varied here is the gloriously even quality of the writing. These are stories for crying and laughing and thinking. They are narratives for understanding, for seeking, for finding, yes, because it is a catalogue of lives that are not shown as much and as consistently as we need them to be.

...It is, perhaps, this bulk, this excess, this non-superfluous surplus, this literal and literary embarrassment of riches that sends the strongest of messages. Yes, there is this much talent and achievement here in the literature of people of color, the roots of these writers in Africa, but their immense contribution extends to every continent. It is this good. It is this great. So, how is it that it continues to be such a low percentage of all that is published, widely distributed, critiqued, discussed, taught, and shared?

== Scholarship and awards ==
Connected with the new anthology, the Margaret Busby New Daughters of Africa Award to benefit an African woman student was announced by the publisher, Myriad Editions, in partnership with SOAS, University of London, with accommodation at International Students House, London. The launch of the award was made possible by the fact that, as well as Margaret Busby and her publisher donating to the fund from the anthology's earnings, all the contributors waived their fees in support of the cause. The first recipient of the award was announced in July 2020 as Idza Luhumyo from Kenya, with the second scholar, Stella Gichohi, enrolling in October 2023.

In 2020, Busby and Myriad also teamed with community-interest organization The Black Curriculum – founded to address the lack of black British history being taught – to donate 500 copies of New Daughters of Africa to schools in the UK. In 2021, together with Literandra, a non-profit digital platform focused on literary art forms from the African continent, Myriad donated 200 copies of New Daughters of Africa to the Ghana-based Library of Africa and the African Diaspora (LOATAD), a Ghana-based library.

New Daughters of Africa was nominated for a 2020 NAACP Image Award in the category of Outstanding Literary Work, alongside books by Petina Gappah, Ta-Nehisi Coates, Jacqueline Woodson, and Margaret Wilkerson Sexton, who was the eventual winner for Fiction.
