= Mitzi J. Smith =

American biblical scholar

Mitzi J. Smith PhD
- Occupation: Biblical scholar
- Known for: First African-American woman to earn a Doctor of Philosophy in New Testament from Harvard
- Title: J. Davison Philips Professor of New Testament at Columbia Theological Seminary

Academic background
- Education: Columbia Union College (BA); Howard University (MDiv); Ohio State University (MA); Harvard University (PhD)

Academic work
- Discipline: Womanist biblical hermeneutics; New Testament Studies; Biblical Studies; African American Interpretation

Mitzi J. Smith is an American biblical scholar who is J. Davison Philips Professor of New Testament at Columbia Theological Seminary. She is the first African-American woman to earn a PhD in New Testament from Harvard University. She has written extensively in the field of womanist biblical hermeneutics, particularly on the intersection between race, gender, class, and biblical studies. She considers her work a form of social justice activism that brings attention to unequal treatment of marginalized groups.

== Early life and education ==
Smith grew up in the west side of Columbus, Ohio. She was born to Flora Carson Smith and Fred Smith, Sr. Smith earned a Master of Divinity at Howard University School of Divinity with an emphasis on Biblical Studies; a Master in Black Studies from Ohio State University, and a BA in Theology from Columbia Union College. She was awarded her PhD in 2006. Her supervisor was François Bovon.

== Career ==
Smith has been preaching in the Christian ministry since 1982, and she is an ordained itinerant elder in the African Methodist Episcopal Church. In 2006, Smith was appointed as assistant professor of New Testament at Ashland Theological Seminary's Detroit Center, where she was promoted to Associate Professor and finally to tenured full Professor. Smith has cited those who have influenced her scholarship at Harvard, including Francois Bovon, Allen Callahan, Cain Hope Felder, Katie Cannon, emilie townes, Clarice Martin, and Renita Weems.

== Works ==
=== The Literary Construction of the Other in the Acts of the Apostles: Charismatics, the Jews, and Women ===
In The Literary Construction of the Other in the Acts of the Apostles, Mitzi Smith argues the author of the book of Acts constructs charismatics, the Jews, and women as "other" to the male apostles of the early Jesus movement. In turn, the "othering" of these marginalized groups constructs the self-identity and authority of the male apostles. This process of identity construction maintained the early church's hierarchal relationship above charismatics and Jews and validated the patriarchal system within the early Christian community.

According to Smith, Acts consistently props up the apostles by characterizing them as "filled with the Spirit" and possessing unique authority. Charismatics and Jews are described as lacking these qualities which suggests Acts makes charismatics and Jews "external others" and portrays the church as superior. For Smith, "external others" are those in Acts who are close in "religious and functional proximity" to the apostles but are portrayed as the antagonistic characters of that relationship. Women in the early Jesus movement were either not described as "filled with the Spirit," or their roles within the community were minimized by how Acts portrays them as subordinate to Peter and Paul. These contrasts suggest women in Acts function as "internal others" which maintains the patriarchal hierarchy within the early Jesus movement itself. According to Smith, "internal others" in Acts are those who are members of the early Christian community but are "in some way marginalized." Ultimately, the purpose of the external and internal others in Acts is to form the "self-identity for the apostles and other approved intermediaries" through contrast.

For Smith, re-reading Acts in this way helps challenge the tendency of being blind to the polemical and political "othering" in texts that are considered sacred and infallible. When a text achieves such a status, it becomes easy for its readers to perceive its treatment and description of "others" as "paradigmatic models for and prescriptive for social practice." Smith encourages her readers to use sacred texts, like Acts, as a way to become conscious of the "othering" process and to resist the temptation to do the same.

== Bibliography ==
=== Books ===
- The Oxford Handbook of Bible, Race, and Diaspora. Edited by Mitzi J. Smith, Raj Nadella, and Luis Menéndez-Antuña. New York: Oxford University Press, 2025.
- Not Wanting a Thing to Be the Thing: An African American Woman Biblical Scholar’s Stroke Memoir. Eugene, OR: Cascade Books, 2025.
- Chloe and Her People : A Womanist Critical Dialogue with First Corinthians. Eugene, OR: Cascade Books, 2023.
- (ed./contributor) Bitter the Chastening Rod: Africana Biblical Interpretation After Stony the Rod we Trod in the Time of BLM, SayHerName and MeToo. Lanham: Fortress Academic. 2022.
- co-author with Michael Newheart. We are All Witnesses: Toward Disruptive and Creative Biblical Interpretation. Eugene, OR: Cascade,2023.
- (ed./contributor) Minoritized Women Reading Race and Ethnicity: Intersectional Approaches to Constructed Identity and Early Christian Texts. Lanham: Lexington Books. 2020.
- Smith, Mitzi J. and Yung Suk Kim. Decentering the New Testament: A Reintroduction. Eugene/Cascade Books, 2018.
- Womanist Sass and Back Talk: Social (In)Justice, Intersectionality and Biblical Interpretation. Eugene/Cascade Books, 2018.
- Insights from an African American Interpretation. Reading the Bible in the 21st Century Series: Minneapolis: Fortress Press, May 2017.
- (ed.) I Found God in Me. A Womanist Biblical Hermeneutics Reader. Eugene/Cascade Books, 2015. Received CHOICE Magazine book of the year award.
- (eds) Smith J. Mitzi and Lalitha Jayachitra. Teaching All Nations: Interrogating the Great Commission. Minneapolis: Fortress Press, 2014.
- The Literary Construction of the Other in the Acts of the Apostles: Charismatics, the Jews, and Women. Eugene/Wipf & Stock/Pickwick, 2011.

=== Journal articles, book chapters, essays, and Bible commentaries ===
- "'He Never Said a Mumbalin Word': A Womanist Perspective of Crucifixion, Sexual Violence, and Sacralized Silence." In "When Did We See You Naked?" Edited by Jayme Reaves and David Tombs. London: SCM, 2021. Triple Peer Reviewed
- "Response to Diverse Contextual Readings of John 4:1–42." Minoritized Readings (John 4). Edited by Tat-Siong Benny Liew and Fernando Segovia. Atlanta: SBL; Semeia Studies, 2021.
- "Hagar's Children Still Ain't Free: Paul's Counterterror Rhetoric, Constructed Identity, Enslavement, and Gal 3:28." In Minoritized Women Reading Race/Ethnicity and Early Christianity. Edited by Mitzi Smith and Jin Young Choi. Lexington/Fortress Academic, October 2020.
- "'What, then, is the Church?': A Womanist Biblical Scholar's Response." @This Point: Repair. Decatur, GA: Columbia Theological Seminary, June 2020. https://www.ctsnet.edu/at-this-point/what- thenis-church-womanist-response/
- "Philemon." Wesley One Volume Commentary. Edited by Kenneth Collins and Robert W. Wall. United Methodist Publishing House. Nashville: Abingdon, 2020.
- "Acts of the Apostles," Lexham Context Commentary: New Testament (LCCNT), released in Logos Bible Software February 2020.
- "Howard Thurman and the Religion of Jesus: Survival of the Disinherited and Womanist Wisdom." Journal for the Study of the Historical Jesus 17.3 (2019): 271–92.
- "Paul, Timothy and the Respectability Politics of Race: A Womanist Reading of Acts 16:1–5." Religions / Special Issue – Current Trends in New Testament Study 10.3 (2019). Open access: https://www.mdpi.com/2077-1444/10/3/190
- "‛Love Never Fails': Re-Reading 1 Cor 13 and Constructing a Womanist Hermeneutic of Love's Struggle." Theologies of Failure. Edited by Roberto D. Sirvent and Duncan Reyburn. Eugene, OR: Cascade, 2019.
- "Resisting the Great Co-mission." Unsettling the Word: Biblical Experiments in Decolonization. Edited by Steve Heinrichs. Winnipeg, Canada: CommonWord, May 2018.
- "The Politics of Sass, Race, Gender, and the Syrophoenician Woman. A Womanist Reading of Intersectionality and Inter(con)textuality." Womanist Biblical Interpretation: Expanding the Discourse. Semeia. Edited by Gay L. Byron and Vanessa Lovelace. Atlanta: SBL Press, 2016.
- "Womanism, Intersectionality, and Biblical Justice." Mutuality Magazine 23.2 (2016): 8–11.
- "Give Me Jesus: Salvation History in the African American Spirituals." African American Voices. Edited by Thomas Slater. Vols II and I; Lewiston, NY: Mellon, 2015.
- "'This Little Light of Mine': The Womanist Biblical Scholar as Prophetess, Iconoclast and Activist." I Found God in Me. Edited by Mitzi J. Smith. Eugene, OR: Cascade, 2015.
- "Fashioning our Own Souls: A Womanist Reading of the Virgin-Whore Binary in Matthew and Revelation." I Found God in Me. Edited by Mitzi J. Smith. Eugene, OR: Cascade, 2015.
- "US Colonial Missions to African Slaves: Catechizing Black Souls, Traumatizing the Black Psyche." Teaching All Nations: Interrogating the Great Commission. Edited by Mitzi J. Smith and Lalitha Jayachitra. Minneapolis: Fortress, May 2014.
- "Knowing More Than is Good for One: A Womanist Interrogation of the Matthean Great Commission." Teaching All Nations: Interrogating the Great Commission. Edited by Mitzi J. Smith and Lalitha Jayachitra. Minneapolis: Fortress, July 2014.
- "Minjung, the Black Masses, and the Global Imperative: A Womanist Reading of Luke's Soteriological Hermeneutical Circle." Ochlos and Minjung. Edited by Yung Suk Kim. Eugene, OR: Wipf and Stock, 2013.
- "Matthew 13:47–53; Matthew 13:54–58." Feasting on the Gospels. A Feasting on the Word Project. Louisville: Westminster/John Knox, 2013.
- "Feminist/Womanist Criticisms" and "African American Biblical Criticism." Dictionary of Jesus and The Gospels. Edited by Joel Green, et al. Downers Grove: Intervarsity, 2013.
- "Give Them What You Have": A Womanist Reading of the Matthean Feeding Miracle (Matt 14:13–21). The Journal of the Bible and Human Transformation 3.1 (September 2013). [An online peer-reviewed journal], http://www.bibleandtransformation.com/JBHT/Volume_3_%282013%29.html
- "1 Corinthians 15:12–20" for "Between Text and Sermon." Interpretation: A Journal of Bible and Theology 67.3 (July 2013).
- "Zilpha Elaw." Biographical History of Women Biblical Interpreters. Edited by Marion Taylor. Grand Rapids: Baker Academic, 2012.
- "Philemon." Women's Bible Commentary. Third Revised Edition. Edited by Sharon Ringe, Carol Newsom and Jacqueline Lapsley. Louisville: Westminster/John Knox, 2012.
- "Utility, Fraternity and Reconciliation: Ancient Slavery as a Context for Onesimus." Onesimus Our Brother: Reading Religion, Race, and Slavery in Philemon. Edited by Demetrius Williams, James Noel, and Matthew Johnson. Minneapolis: Fortress, 2012.
- "'Unbossed and Unbought': Zilpha Elaw and Old Elizabeth and a Political Discourse of Origins." Black Theology: An International Journal 9.3 (2011): 287–311.
- "Slavery and the Early Church." True to Our Native Land. An African-American New Testament Commentary. Edited by Brian K. Blount, Cain Hope Felder, Clarice J. Martin, Emerson B. Powery. Minneapolis: Fortress, 2007: 11–22.
- "Ephesians." True to Our Native Land. An African-American New Testament Commentary. Edited by Brian K. Blount, Cain Hope Felder, Clarice J. Martin, Emerson B. Powery. Minneapolis: Fortress, 2007: 348–62.
- "Understand Ye a Parable! The Acts of Peter and the Twelve Apostles as Parable Narrative." Apocrypha: International Journal of Apocryphal Literatures 13 (2002): 29–52.
- "Roman Slavery in Antiquity." The African American Jubilee Bible. New York: American Bible Society, 1999: 157–85.
