= Bircan =

Bircan is a Turkish name, and it may refere to:

== Given name ==
- Bircan Altuntaş (born 2001), Turkish female judoka

== Surname ==
- Ayse Bircan (born 1954), Turkish activist and writer
- Bekir Sıtkı Bircan (1886–1967), Turkish footballer, high school teacher and one of the founders of Galatasaray SK
- Burcu Bircan (born 1988), Turkish volleyball player
