= Sandra Lynn Barnes =

American educator, author, ordained Baptist minister, and documentary filmmaker

- Born: June 23, 1964 (age 62)
- Education: Georgia State University
- Occupation: Professor
- Known for: Sociology of Religion, Urban Studies

Sandra Lynn Barnes (born June 23, 1964) is an American educator, author, ordained Baptist minister, and documentary filmmaker. She is the C.V. Starr Professor and Chair of the Dept. of Sociology at Brown University. From 2008 to 2021, she was a joint-appointed Professor of Sociology in the Department of Human and Organizational Development in Peabody College of Education and Human Development and the Divinity School at Vanderbilt University.

Barnes is an urban sociologist with a focus on the sociology of religion, inequality, social justice, and youth education. She served as the assistant vice chancellor for equity, diversity, and inclusion in the Office for Equity, Diversity, and Inclusion at Vanderbilt University from 2016 to 2018. She was honored as a Vanderbilt Pioneer in 2017.

== Education ==
Barnes earned a bachelor's degree in mathematics and economics in 1986 from Fisk University where she graduated Phi Beta Kappa. She earned a master's degree from Georgia Institute of Technology and the Interdenominational Theological Center, and a Ph.D. in sociology from Georgia State University in December 1999.

== Career ==
Prior to joining Brown University and Vanderbilt University, Barnes was an associate professor in the department of sociology at Case Western Reserve University from 2007 to 2008. She served as assistant professor in the department of sociology & anthropology and the African American Studies Research Center at Purdue University from 2000 to 2007. From 2008 until 2021, she was a joint appointed Professor of Sociology in the Department of Human and Organizational Development (HOD) and the Divinity School at Vanderbilt University.

From 2010 to 2012, Barnes served as the president of the Association of Black Sociologists, a national organization of social scientists, community activists, and students. Barnes received the Cox-Johnson-Frazier Award from the American Sociological Association in 2019 which is awarded for scholarly contributions to the field of social justice, particularly disadvantaged populations.

== Works ==
=== Single-authored books ===
- Barnes, Sandra. 2005. The Cost of Being Poor: A Comparative Study of Life in Poor Urban Neighborhoods in Gary, Indiana. New York: State University Press of New York. ISBN 978-0791464687
- Barnes, Sandra. 2006. Subverting the Power of Prejudice: Resources for Individual and Social Change. Downers Grove, IL: InterVarsity Press. ISBN 978-0830833399
- Barnes, Sandra. 2007. On the Market: Positioning Yourself for a Successful Academic Job Search. Boulder, CO: Lynn Reiner Publishers. ISBN 978-1588265111
- Barnes, Sandra. 2010. Black Megachurch Culture: Models for Education and Empowerment. New York: Peter Lang Press. ASIN: B01JXTLQH4
- Barnes, Sandra. 2012. Live Long and Prosper: How Black Megachurches Address HIV/AIDS and Poverty in the Age of Prosperity Theology. New York: Fordham University Press. ISBN 978-0823249565

=== Dual-authored, edited, and co-edited books ===
- Battle, Juan and Sandra Barnes. 2009. Black Sexualities: Probing Passions, Problems, and Policies. New York: Rutgers University Press. ISBN 978-0813546025
- Wimberly, Anne Streaty, Sandra Barnes, and Karma Johnson. 2013. Claiming Hope: Youth Ministry in the Black Church. New York: Judson Press. ISBN 978-0817017361
- Barnes, Sandra, Zandria Robinson, and Earl Wright III (Eds). 2014. Re-Positioning Race: Prophetic Research in a Post-Racial Obama Age. New York: State University Press of New York. ISBN 978-1438450865
- Barnes, Sandra L. Barnes and Anne Streaty Wimberly. 2016. Empowering Black Youth of Promise: Education and Socialization in the Village-minded Black Church. New York: Routledge Press. ISBN 978-1138600249
- Barnes, Sandra et al. 2016. Academics in Action! A Model for Community-Engaged Research, Teaching, and Service. New York: Fordham University Press. ISBN 978-0823268801
- Barnes, Sandra L. and Benita Blanford-Jones. 2019. Kings of Mississippi: Race, Religious Education, and the Making of a Middle Class Black Family in the Segregated South. Cambridge, England: Cambridge University Press. ISBN 978-1108424066

=== Documentaries ===
- Gary, Indiana: A Tale of Two Cities (2018)
- About the Kids Volume 1: Education in Gary, Indiana (2020)
- About the Kids Volume 2: Education in Gary, Indiana (2021)
