= Angelamaría Dávila =

Puerto Rican poet & writer (1944–2003)

- Born: Angelamaría Dávila Malavé; February 21, 1944; Humacao, Puerto Rico
- Died: July 8, 2003 (aged 59); Río Grande, Puerto Rico
- Other names: Ánjelamaria Dávila; Angela María Dávila
- Occupation: Poet
- Years active: 1966-2003
- Spouse: José María Lima
- Children: 2

Angelamaría Dávila Malavé (February 21, 1944 – July 8, 2003) was a Puerto Rican poet and writer who explored themes of love, relationships, and womanhood. She is an Afro-feminist and Afro-Caribbean poet and visual artist who identified her black Puerto Ricanness as a defining characteristic of her work and personal identity.

== Biography ==
Angelamaría Dávila Malavé was born in Humacao, Puerto Rico February 21, 1944.

She wrote poetry in her native Spanish before attending the Universidad de Puerto Rico in the 1960s and was a part of the Generación del 60, a prominent and revolutionary group of Puerto Rican poets, where she contributed to the literary magazine Guajana.

She collaborated with fellow Puerto Rican poet and husband José María Lima. Angelamaría was a visual artist and singer who performed at cabarets and included her illustrations alongside her poems as seen in la querencia, in which color pencil and black pen drawn human figures are accompanied by the graphic design work of artist Nelson Sambolín.

She has two living children, actor Aurelio Lima (born in 1970) and Amanda Colón (born in 1980).

She died from health complications on July 8, 2003 at a assisted living home in Río Grande, Puerto Rico.

== Career ==
Puerto Rican literary magazine, Revista Guajana, credits Dávila online with contributing to the first issue (G1.1) of Guajana in 1962 with two poems entitled I and II. She would soon after leave Guajana to continue her work as an individual poet.

Her influences included Julia de Burgos, Clara Lair, Sylvia Rexach and Sor Juana Inés de la Cruz. According to her biography on the Fundación Nacional para la Cultura Popular of Puerto Rico, in 1963, noted poet Jorge Luis Morales presented Dávila to the Ateneo Puertorriqueño, where she performed her first recital. In 1965 some of her poems were included in the Antología de jóvenes poetas edited by the Instituto de Cultura Puertorriqueña.

In 1966 she and husband José María Lima collaborated on their poemario (a collection of poems), Homenaje al ombligo (Homage to the navel), a work of poetry and drawings centering on intimacy and sensuality.

In 1977, Dávila published her second book of poems Animal fiero y tierno. This was Dávila's first solo book publication.

In 1994, her work was included in the “Antología de la poesía hispanoamericana actual”, edited by Julio Ortega.

In 2004, a number of her poems were included in “Flor de lumbre: Guajana 40 aniversario 1962-2002".

A third collection of poems, la querencia, was published posthumously in 2006 by the Instituto de Cultura Puertorriqueña.

== Themes in her work ==
=== Love ===
Love is a central idea to the body of Dávila's work as evidence of her interest and engagement with love's place in the human experience. In la querencia, for example, a preface poem following after the title page posits love in relation to Spanish prepositions that locate and position love:

a afuera adentro arriba abajo adelante atrás antes bajo cabe con

contra cuando de desde después durante en entre excepto hacia

hasta mediante mientras para por pues salvo según sin so sobre

tras

el amor.

According to love, against love, within love, and without love are manners of engaging with the concept of love that Dávila establishes at the beginning of her work for readers to consider and as foreground to the further exploration within the work. Significantly, the word querencia means love, fondness, and attachment. Throughout this poemario, she directs and muses poems about herself and a male lover, their love and how their bodies play a role in their experience.

=== The human body ===
Dávila writes about the human body, especially in the sixth section of la querencia entitled, "MORADA TERCERA/TU CUERPO SIEMPRE CÁLIDO", in which she explores "cosas del cuerpo, del ánima, del silencio" in three "habitaciones" containing approximately 24 poems.

In the first section she dedicates 10-11 line poems about different body parts of her lover. In a poem about his hands, she compares them to roots like "certain scars" and explores the idea of her thirst as maintaining the hands which enjoy and support her desire:

"tus manos"

son tus manos agoreras

dos destiladas raíces

de la tierra; cicatrices

desprendidas y certeras.

crecientes van por la vera

del aire, que las detiene,

arrastradas se sostienen

prometen, hurgan, rebuscan

siempre encuentran, siempre

gustan

de mi sed, que las mantiene

Dávila states that his hands "sustain", "promise", "always find", and "always enjoy" her thirst, evincing the intimate and sensual language emblematic of her poetry. The choice to explore the human body in poetry are standard for Dávila's work, where she engages with the personal, using her writing as a conduit to a better understanding of humanity in a physical and spiritual sense.

== Books of Poetry by Ánjelamaría Dávila ==
- Homenaje al ombligo, Dávila, Ánjelamaría y Lima, Jose Maria. 1966
  - a collaborative book of poetry and drawings
- Animal fiero y tierno, Dávila, Ánjelamaría. Rio Piedras, P.R.: Ediciones Huracán, 1981.
  - first published in 1977.
- la querencia, Dávila, Ánjelamaría. Instituto de Cultura Puertorriqueña, 2006.
  - published posthumously

== Works that mention the author ==
- Hilo de Aracne: literatura puertorriqueña, Sotomayor, Áurea María. Editorial de la Universidad de Puerto Rico, 1995, 101–107.
  - Writer and professor of Latin American, Cultural Studies, and Gender, Sexuality, and Women's Studies Program, Áurea María Sotomayor discusses Ánjelamaría's poetry and personhood looking at Homenaje al ombligo as a work in which the poet tackles the birth of herself (self-conceptualization). Sotomayor critically engages with Dávila's poetic language and process of self-definition.
- Las palabras sublevadas, Fornerín, Miguel Angel. Puerto Rico: Miguel Angel Fornerín, December 26, 2011, 164–165.
  - In this work, Puerto Rican author and critic Miguel Angel Fornerín comments upon Caribbean authors, their rhythm and legacies. On the page simply titled "Ánjelamaría Dávila", Fornerín notes that Dávila and her work collapse the boundaries of the culto and the popular to bring the sublime and irreverent together. Fornerín considers her a pioneer as a woman not bound by the moral conventions of her time, primarily the 70s, in which she challenges hyper masculine attitudes and expectations of femininity to explore love, relationships, and womanhood without limits.
- Puerto Rico indócil: antología de cuentos puertorriqueños del siglo XXI, Belén, Ana y Sevillano, Martín. Sevilla: Algaida, 2015, 77–86.
  - Puerto Rico indócil: antología de cuentos puertorriqueños del siglo XXI includes a short fiction story about the murder of Ánjelamaría Dávila. In "Ficha: Ánjelamaría Dávila", Puerto Rican writer Yvonne Denis Rosario exaggerates the death of Ánjelamaría Dávila as a murder by a medical examiner and boyfriend who admires Dávila's craft of words and the public praise they yield, yet who ultimately kills her. Yvonne Denis Rosario assumes the role of an intimate friend, all-knowing investigator and medical examiner privy to the details of the case, the testimony of the neighbor, and the autopsy of her friend. She compares the poetry of Ánjelamaría to brilliant butterflies that come out of her mouth in perhaps a nod to the poets reference of animals throughout her work but especially in Animal fiero y tierno. Rosario references Dávila's Alzheimer's.

== See also ==
- Luis Palés Matos

== Multimedia ==
- The author reading some of her poetry: https://www.youtube.com/watch?v=Cv4dG1XKJUA
- Amarilis Tavárez reading "Ante tanta visión" by Dávila from her book of poems Animal fiero y tierno: https://www.youtube.com/watch?v=R2wA6tRlfHU
- Several poems on Revista Guajana: http://revistaguajana.com/paginaguajana2/angelamaria.htm
