= Agboton =

Agboton is a surname. Notable people with the surname include:

- Agnès Agboton (born 1960), Beninese writer
- Marcel Honorat Léon Agboton (1941–2023), Beninese Roman Catholic archbishop
