= Nafissatou Diallo =

Nafissatou Diallo may refer to:

- Nafissatou Niang Diallo (1941–1982), Senegalese writer
- Nafissatou Diallo, maid at the centre of the New York v. Strauss-Kahn case
