= Killing of Adolfina Villanueva Osorio =

1980 police shooting in Puerto Rico

The killing of Adolfina Villanueva Osorio occurred on February 6, 1980 at Tocones, Loíza, Puerto Rico. Villanueva Osorio, an Afro–Puerto Rican woman born c. 1946, was shot dead as police attempted to evict her family from their home. The house was quickly demolished and at trial, a police officer was found not guilty of shooting her. Villanueva Osorio is remembered as a victim of racial violence by the local community, which has prevented any development of the site of her house.

== Background ==
Adolfina Villanueva Osorio was an Afro–Puerto Rican woman born c. 1946. She lived with her husband Agustín Carrasquillo Pinet beside the beach in Tocones, Loíza, Puerto Rico. They had six children. She worked as a seamstress and he was a fisherman. On their land, which they had inherited from Carrasquillo Pinet's father, they grew papaya, pigeon peas and yucca. When the Catholic Church announced it wanted to build a summer house on their land for Luis Aponte Martínez, the Archbishop of San Juan, the couple refused to move. They started a judicial process aiming to show that they had the right of possession.

== Killing and legacy ==
On 6 February 1980, Villanueva Osorio was at home with her husband and two children, the other four siblings being a school. Carrasquillo Pinet planned to fish for crabs but stayed home in the morning because of bad weather. Police officers came to the house intending to evict the family and began shooting weapons. Villanueva Osorio was killed by sixteen bullet wounds; the police claimed she had been in possession of a machete, whilst her husband denied she was armed.

The house was quickly demolished and at trial, the police officer Víctor Estrella was found not guilty of shooting her by a jury; nobody has ever been found responsible for the killing of Villanueva Osorio. In her book Capá prieto, Yvonne Denis Rosario wrote one chapter about her death. The killing of Villanueva Osorio is remembered by the local community, which sabotaged any attempts to build on the site of her house. The fortieth anniversary of her death was commemorated by her husband with a magazine interview in which he linked the racial aspect of her killing to the murder of George Floyd in the US.
