= Burcu =

- Gender: Female

Origin
- Language: Turkish
- Meaning: "Scent", "Fragrance", "Redolence"

Burcu (Turkish pronunciation: [ˈbuɾdʒu]}) is a common feminine Turkish given name. In Turkish, "Burcu" means "Scent", "Fragrance", "Redolence" and/or petrichor.

== People ==
- Burcu Alıcı (born 2001), Turkish weightlifter
- Burcu Bircan (born 1988), a Turkish volleyball player
- Burcu Çetinkaya (born 1981), Turkish rally driver
- Burcu Dağ (born 1981), Turkish world champion para-archer
- Burcu Dolunay (born 1984), Turkish swimmer
- Burcu Düner (born 1979), Turkish-German footballer
- Burcu Erbaş (born 1988), a Turkish basketball player
- Burcu Esmersoy (born 1976), Turkish anchorwoman, journalist, occasional actress, former model
- Burcu Güneş (born 1975), a Turkish singer
- Burcu Köksal (born 1980), Turkish politician
- Burcu Özsoy (born 1976), Turkish antarctic scientist
- Burcu Pirinçci (born 1990), Turkish handball player
- Burcu Sallakoğlu (born 1987), Turkish taekwondo practitioner
- Burcu Yüksel (born 1990), Turkish high jumper
- Tutku Burcu Yüzgenç (born 1999), Turkish volleyball player
