= Kristina Rungano =

Zimbabwean poet and short story writer (born 1963)

Kristina Masuwa-Morgan (born 28 February 1963) is a Zimbabwean poet and short story writer, better known as Kristina Rungano. She was the first published Zimbabwean woman poet.

== Biography ==
Rungano was born in 1963 in Harare, Zimbabwe. Her father, who was Roman Catholic, ran a business in Zvimba District. She was educated at Catholic boarding schools near her hometown, before moving to the United Kingdom to study management and computer science. In 1979, having gained a diploma in computer science, she returned to Zimbabwe and worked at the Harare Scientific Computing Centre.

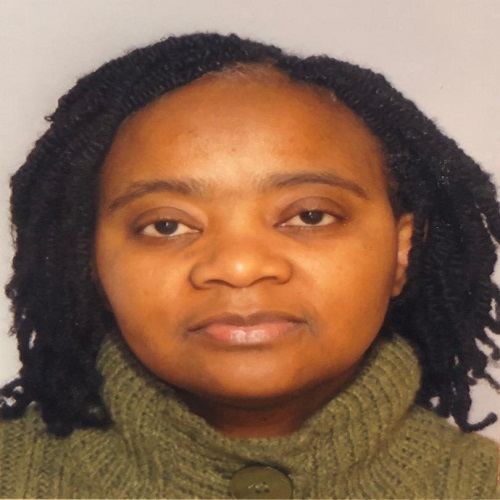
Kristina Rungano

== Career ==
Her first poetry collection, A Storm is Brewing, was published by Zimbabwe Publishing House in 1984; this made her the first female Zimbabwean poet to have her work published. Her poetry particularly covers themes relating to the experiences of women and war. Some of her poetry has subsequently been included in anthologies such as Daughters of Africa (1992), The Heinemann Book of African Women's Poetry (1995), The Penguin Book of Modern African Poetry (1999) and Step into a World: A Global Anthology of New Black Literature (2000). Rungano's second collection, To Seek a Reprieve and Other Poems, was published in 2004.

Rungano currently lives in England, where she is the Director of Learning and Teaching at the University of Greenwich.

== Bibliography ==
- A Storm is Brewing: Poems, Zimbabwe Publishing House, 1984, ISBN 978-0949932839
- To Seek a Reprieve and Other Poems, 2004
