= Zoe Adjonyoh =

British writer and cook (born 1977)

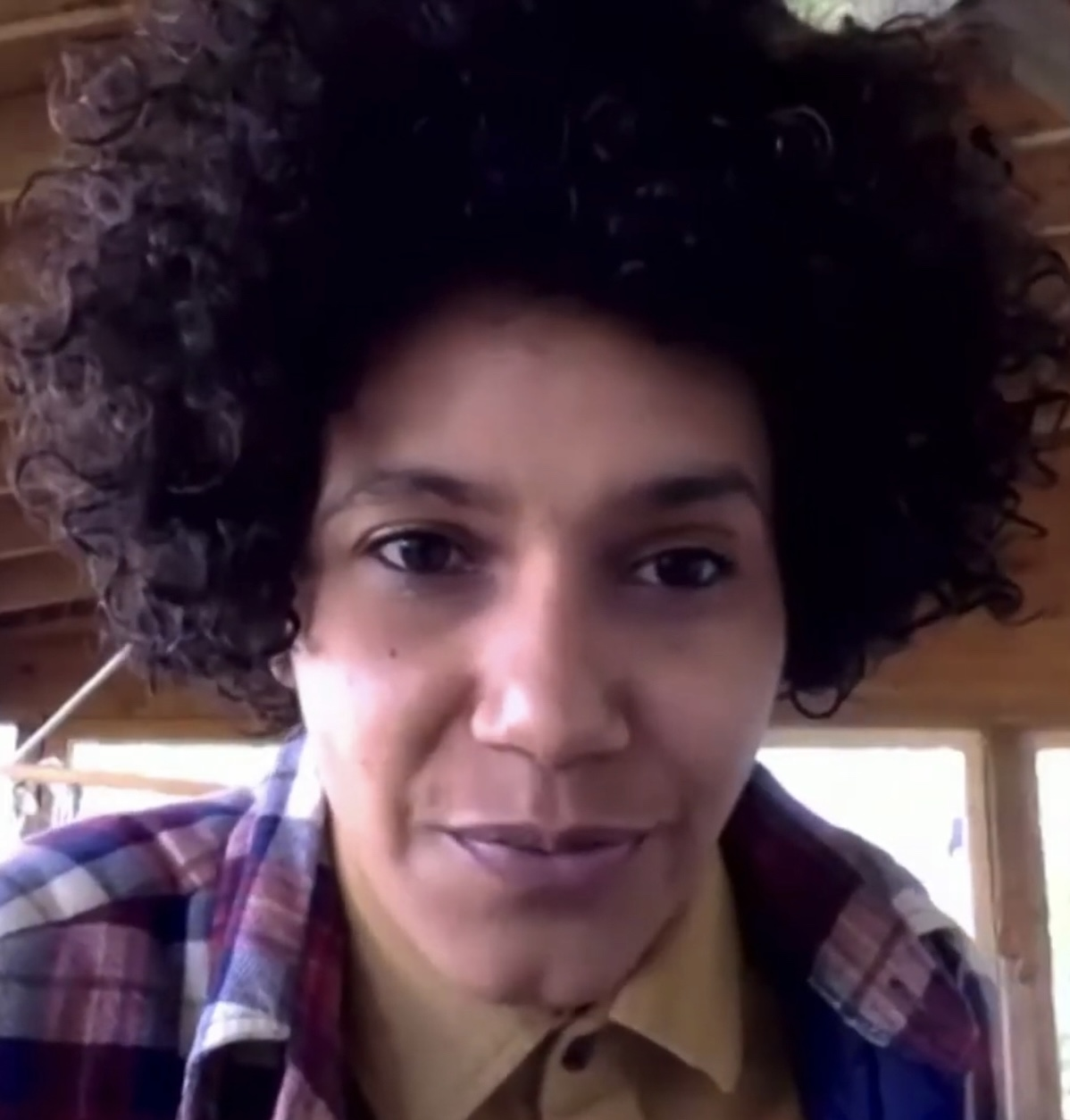
- Adjonyoh in 2020
- Born: 1977 (age 48–49); Essex, England
- Occupations: Writer and cook
- Known for: Founder of restaurant Zoe's Ghana Kitchen
- Notable work: Zoe's Ghana Kitchen (2017)
- Website: www.zoesghanakitchen.com

Zoe Adjonyoh (born 1977) is a British writer and cook, founder of "Zoe's Ghana Kitchen", a Ghanaian pop-up restaurant brand, which is also the title of her debut cookbook. She is also the editor of Serving Up: Essays On Food, Identity and Culture.

== Biography ==
She was born in Essex, England, in the late 1970s to a Ghanaian father and an Irish mother, who had met in Kilburn, North London. Adjonyoh taught herself to cook the foods of her father's home country, and she began a restaurant called Zoe's Ghana Kitchen in her home in East London, after the popularity of a stall she set up selling peanut stew when a local arts festival was taking place nearby in 2010. Although she had started making and selling Ghanaian food in order to fund her Creative Writing MA at Goldsmiths, University of London, her tutor suggested that to focus on her business might be a better way into writing the memoir she was working on. She has since run pop-up restaurants in different London venues as well as in other places, including Berlin and New York. She has said: "The point of Ghana Kitchen is to take people on a food journey where they can try ingredients and flavours they've never tasted before. There's that sense of adventure and I'm trying to guide people with that."

She is the author of a 2017 book also called Zoe's Ghana Kitchen, about which Ruby Tandoh said: "If you are what you eat, then Adjonyoh's debut cookbook, Zoe's Ghana Kitchen, is a kind of edible portrait: a celebratory, intelligent, often chaotic rendering of the person she is, and of her heritage." According to Wendell Brock's review of the book: "In her delightfully quirky book, Adjonyoh shares her spin on the food of her Ghanaian father’s homeland, with some funny side notes on her experiences in Ghana and how she's mashed up her Irish mum and her African father's native cuisines. There are even soundtracks to play while cooking and eating. I suspect there’s a memoir in the making here."

Adjonyoh contributed a short piece about her father to the 2019 anthology New Daughters of Africa, edited by Margaret Busby.

== Bibliography ==
- Zoe's Ghana Kitchen, Mitchell Beazley, 2017, ISBN 978-1784721633
- (As editor) Serving Up: Essays On Food, Identity and Culture, 2026.

== Awards and recognition ==
Adjonyoh won the 2018 Culinary Iconoclast Award. In 2018, she was appointed as a judge for the Great Taste Awards, "the Oscars of the food and drink world".
