= Eulalia Bernard =

Afro-Costa Rican writer and poet (1935–2021)

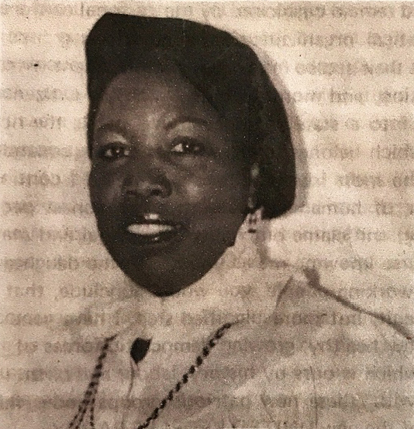
- Born: Maunrice Eulalee Bernard Little; July 7, 1935; Limón, Costa Rica
- Died: July 11, 2021 (aged 86)

Maunrice Eulalee Bernard Little (7 July 1935 – 11 July 2021), known as Eulalia Bernard, was a Costa Rican writer, poet, activist, politician, diplomat, and educator. She is considered in her country as an icon of the African descent culture. Bernard was the first Afro-Costa Rican woman to be published in her country.

== Early life and education ==
She was born in Port Limón, Costa Rica, on July 7, 1935. Her parents were Carolina Little Crosby (also known as Carolina Bernard), a teacher with a transformative vision, and Christopher Bernard Jackson, a tailor. Both were Jamaican immigrants. Her mother supported her breaking with traditional racist culture, by getting roles such as the angel in Catholic events.

For her primary schooling, Bernard attended Colegio Nuestra Señora de Sion in San José (Costa Rica) and secondary school at Colegio Diurno in Limón City. In 1956, she started working as a teacher. After teaching in San José and Heredia, she decided to continue studying at the university, becoming the first Afrodescendant woman to graduate from the School of Modern Languages. Later, at the Cardiff University in Wales, she did graduate studies in Linguistics and Educative Television. As part of her graduate studies, Bernard researched on the phonology of Limonese Creole in 1969, becoming a pioneer of the field.

== Professional career ==
Bernard was also a pioneer in the black political field within her country and the region. In the 1970s, she was a consolidated activist of the African diaspora. In the 1970s she released a recording of her poetry and the fact that she chose a record instead of the established print media to publish her poetry caused quite some controversy among the Latin American academics.

In 1974, Bernard served as a cultural attaché in Jamaica. That same year, she proposed and led the "Educative Plan for Limón" at the Ministry of Public Education. The goal of this Plan was to have bilingual and bicultural education. However, the plan was interrupted because the Minister of the moment argued that the racism was a problem that was being imported to the country, as some personalities such as Harriet Tubman were part of the posters for the campaign. For the Plan, Bernard has taken advantage or her knowledge in linguistics. Additionally, Bernard's studies on educative television made her a precursor for the foundation of the Costa Rican public System for National Radio and Television.

In 1977, she participated in the First Conference on Black Culture in the Americas. She was part of the executive committee, being one of the only two women in the body which included prominent figures such as Nelson Estupiñán Bass or Manuel Zapata Olivella. In 1978, Bernard was a protagonist figure in the First National Seminar of the Black People in Costa Rica; she was the only woman in the board of directors. The goal of the event was reviewing the conditions of the black community in Costa Rica as well as the structural racism of the country.

In 1981, she established a Chair of Afro-American Cultural Studies at the University of Costa Rica. In 1982, with her book Ritmohéroe, Bernard became the first Afro-Costa Rican woman with a printed publication. The poetry in the book focused on her hometown Limon. From 1982 until 1993, she taught the class "Introduction to the African-American Culture: Africa in the Americas" at the University of Costa Rica.

Part of Bernard's goals was having a political effect in her students, and among her students a prominent figure is Epsy Campbell, former vice-president of Costa Rica and the first woman of color on that position in the country.

Bernard was also a professor for Afro-Caribbean literature in universities at the United States and Canada. She was invited to numerous international conferences to present about afrodescendants in the Caribbean, Europe, and the Americas. She also worked at the United Nations doing research on the creative works of black people in the Americas. With her writing and advocacy, Bernard has contributed to safeguarding the heritage of the African descent community and to passing it down.

=== Political career ===
In 1986, she was a candidate to congresswoman for the United People's Party. She was the first black candidate in a non-traditional and communist party, as there was a historic covenant of the black community and the National Liberation Party. She decided to break that covenant in response to the social inequalities of the time.

== Writings ==
Bernard Little published in Spanish, English and Limonese Creole. Her works focus on Limon as a repository of the ancestral memory of African descendants, particularly on the relationships of Africa and America. They also express the tensions of the relationship of the black community and the ideas of belonging to the Costa Rican nation-State. In a poem on her Jamaican cousin (Spanish: Requiem a mi primo Jamaiquino) in Ritmoheroe of 1982, she deals with the difficulties of her cousin to obtain citizenship of Costa Rica despite having worked the lands of the country. Many of her poems have text and melodies intertwined and she often performed them live. Her writing is a call for the acceptance of blackness and for reclaiming the black body both politically and aesthetically. Her poems in Ciénaga (2001) are often written from the perspective of "You and I". She was included in the 1992 anthology Daughters of Africa (edited by Margaret Busby), and is featured in publications on selected Afro-Latino writers.

=== Poetry ===
Her writing was mostly poetry:

- 1976: Negritud, first publication in format of a vinyl record
- 1982: Ritmohéroe, with 4 editions between 1982 and 1996
- 1991: My Black King, bilingual poetry collection
- 1997: Griot
- 2001: Ciénaga, 5 editions between 2001 and 2006
- 2011: Tatuaje

A philosophy essay:

- 1981, "Nuevo ensayo sobre la existencia y la libertad política", two editions in 1981, translated as "New Essay on the Existence and the Political Liberty"

== Achievements and awards ==
- First Afro-Costa Rican woman being published in Costa Rica.
- 1991: University for Peace's Distinguished World Citizen award
- 1996: Griot award from the Pan-African Cultural Committee, in recognition of her contribution to the spiritual and cultural health of the community
- 1998: Leadership prize by Howard University
- 1999: dedication of the Festival of Flowers of the African Diaspora (first edition)in recognition of a life dedicated to the defense of the rights of black and afrodescendent people.
- 2009: prize Limón Roots by Limón province.
- 2011: dedication of the Festival of Flowers of the African Diaspora
- 2021: dedication of the Festival of Flowers of the African Diaspora, posthumous tribute

== Links ==
Library of Congress - Eulalia Bernard reading and commenting on her work
