= Bridget Minamore =

British poet, essayist, journalist and critic (born 1991)

- Born: 1991 (age 34–35); London, England
- Education: University College London
- Occupations: Poet; journalist; critic
- Website: bridgetminamore.com

Bridget Minamore (born 1991) is a British poet, essayist, journalist and critic. She is the author of the 2016 poetry collection Titanic, and her writing has appeared in such outlets as The Guardian, The Stage, i, The Fader, The White Review and in anthologies including New Daughters of Africa (edited by Margaret Busby).

== Biography ==
Bridget Minamore was born in London, England, in 1991, of Ghanaian parentage. She has an English degree from University College London.

She has read her poetry nationally and internationally and in 2013 was shortlisted to be London's inaugural Young Poet Laureate.

In 2015, she was chosen as one of The Hospital Club's Emerging Creatives. Minamore's debut pamphlet, entitled Titanic, was published in 2016, described by LUX Magazine as "a collection of poems which hilariously and hauntingly dissect what it means to love another... writing with a spotless humour and style that tangos with your emotions." In 2018, she co-founded the collective "Critics of Colour" with playwright Sabrina Mahfouz, with the aim of "making writing about theatre, dance, and/or opera more accessible".

Minamore has written regularly for The Guardian, The Stage and other publications about pop culture, theatre, music, race and class. She is a contributor to the 2019 anthologies New Daughters of Africa, edited by Margaret Busby, and Smashing It: Working Class Artists on Life, Art, and Making It Happen, edited by Sabrina Mahfouz.
