= Saida Hagi-Dirie Herzi =

Somali feminist writer (born c. 1950)

- Born: c. 1950 (age 75–76); Mogadishu, Somalia
- Education: King Abdulaziz University; The American University in Cairo
- Occupation: Feminist writer

Saida Hagi-Dirie Herzi (born c. 1950) is a Somali feminist writer. Her English-language short stories, which use semi-autobiographical narratives and thinly veiled allegories to discuss social issues in her native Somalia, have been widely anthologized.

== Early life and education ==
Saida Hagi-Dirie Herzi was born in Mogadishu, Somalia, in the 1950s.

As a child she was subjected to female genital mutilation. The practice is near-universal in Somalia but has been widely criticized internationally. Herzi would later critically revisit the experience in her writing.

Herzi attended King Abdulaziz University in Jeddah, Saudi Arabia, where she graduated with a bachelor's degree in English literature. She later obtained a master's degree from the American University in Cairo.

== Writing ==
Herzi was one of the first Somali writers to produce English-language fiction. Her work deals with Somali sociopolitical issues through a feminist lens, advocating for women's rights and against female genital mutilation and government corruption.

Her first published story, "Against the Pleasure Principle", was initially printed in 1990 in the journal of the Index on Censorship, as there was concern that the brutal depiction of female genital mutilation in the story would be censored. The story contains elements of autobiography, as Herzi herself was subject to the procedure. "Against the Pleasure Principle" was later anthologized elsewhere, including in the 1992 anthology Daughters of Africa (edited by Margaret Busby).

In 1992, Herzi's story "Government by Magic Spell" was included in The Heinemann Book of Contemporary African Short Stories (edited by Chinua Achebe and C. L. Innes). The story was later chosen to be broadcast as part of BBC Radio's Human Cradle series in 2012. "Government by Magic Spell" criticizes corrupt politics and is considered a thinly veiled allegory for the reality in Somalia at the time.

Her other stories include "The Barren Stick", first published in 2002.

Herzi has also taught English at King Abdulaziz University. She no longer lives full-time in Somalia, instead splitting her time among several countries, including the United Kingdom, the United States, and Kenya.
