= Jacqueline Rudet =

British dramatist (born 1962)

- Born: 12 February 1962 (age 64); London, England
- Other name: Magdalene St Luce
- Education: Barking College
- Occupation: Dramatist

Jacqueline Rudet (born 12 February 1962) is a British dramatist.

== Biography ==
Born in London, England, Jacqueline Rudet (also known as Magdalene St Luce), spent her early years in the Caribbean island of Dominica, before returning to Britain, and studying drama at Barking College.

Rudet's play Basin opened at the Royal Court Theatre on 29 October 1985. Set in a London flat after a party the night before, the story centring on the friendship between three Dominican women living in London, Basin was published in Black Plays, edited by Yvonne Brewster (Methuen, 1987), and extracts were included in the anthology Daughters of Africa (edited by Margaret Busby, 1992).

== Works ==
- Money to Live. First produced at the Royal Court Theatre, 1984. Published in Plays by Women, Vol. 5, ed. Mary Remnant, Methuen, 1986).
- Basin. Produced at the Royal Court Theatre, 1985.
- God's Second In Command. First produced at the Royal Court Theatre, 1985.
- Take Back What's Yours. First produced at the Warehouse Theatre, Croydon, 1989.
