= Sandi Russell =

American jazz singer (1946–2017)

Sandi Russell (January 16, 1946 – June 23, 2017) was an American jazz singer and writer who later settled in England. Her book Render Me My Song: African-American Women Writers from Slavery to the Present was influential in efforts to bring women into the African American literary canon.

== Early life and education ==
Sandi Russell was born in New York City in 1946, to a mother with Native American descent and a father descended from enslaved African Americans, and she grew up in the city's Harlem neighborhood. She was accepted into the High School of Music & Art, where she worked with Leonard Bernstein and performed at Lincoln Center. She then earned a scholarship to attend Syracuse University, where she became part of the first class of Black students to integrate the school.

After graduating from Syracuse, Russell pursued postgraduate studies at Hunter College and worked as a teacher in the South Bronx.

== Jazz singing ==
Russell had an interest in music from a young age, which was supported by her family. Her love of jazz was influenced by Duke Ellington, Ella Fitzgerald, Carmen McRae, and others. She eventually, at age 30, began singing jazz professionally. She toured throughout the United States, including with a mixed-race band in the South.

After moving to England in 1984, she continued to perform in London and beyond. In the early 2010s, she helped launch the first jazz festival in her new home city of Durham.

Russell recorded two major albums: Incandescent (2001) and Sweet Thunder (2007).

== Writing ==
As a young woman, Russell worked on weekends at the Schomburg Center for Research in Black Culture, which introduced her to the world of literature. After moving to England, she began working as a writer, starting as a journalist for the Women's Review, an alternative publication in London. As a journalist, she interviewed various significant figures including Toni Morrison and Maya Angelou. Her writing appeared in the anthologies Glancing Fires: An Investigation into Women's Creativity (1985) and Daughters of Africa (1992).

In 1991, she published the nonfiction book Render Me My Song: African-American Women Writers from Slavery to the Present, considered a key feminist intervention in the African American literary canon; she later published the novel Color in 2013. She turned Render Me My Song into a one-woman show, followed by the touring stage show ELLA!, which told the story of Ella Fitzgerald.

Her writing was noted for its orality, owing in part to her ear for music.

== Personal life, death, and legacy ==
Russell suffered from congenital kidney disease beginning in her 40s, but she continued to tour as a musician despite significant difficulty.

She died in 2017 at age 71. A scholarship at Durham University was named in her memory.
