= Grace Akello =

Ugandan writer and diplomat (born 1950)

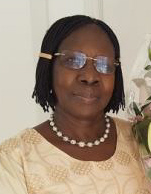
- Born: Dinah Grace Akello; 1950 (age 75–76) near Soroti, Uganda Protectorate
- Education: Makerere University
- Occupations: Poet, essayist, folklorist, and politician

Grace Akello (born 1950) is a Ugandan poet, essayist, folklorist, and politician. She is the Uganda Ambassador to India.

== Early life and education ==
Dinah Grace Akello is Iteso, and was born near Soroti, in the Eastern Region of the Uganda Protectorate. She studied Social Administration and Social Work at Makerere University in Kampala. In 1979, she lived in Tanzania after fleeing from Idi Amin's government as a refugee.

== Career ==
She worked as a magazine editor in Kenya and Tanzania before traveling to England in the 1980s to become an assistant editor for the Commonwealth Secretariat. Akello held the position from 1983 to 1990.

== Politics ==
In 1990, Grace Akello went back to Uganda and created a commission to help solve the issue of the displacement and killing of Teso people during Amin's presidency. This commission lasted until 1996. In 1996, she became a member of the Parliament of Uganda, and in 1999 was appointed Minister for Gender, Labour and Social Development.

From 1999 to 2006, she was a member of the Cabinet of Uganda. She held the position of Minister of Microfinance Initiatives from 1999 to 2003, and the Minister of Northern Uganda from 2003 until losing her seat in 2006. Grace Akello Went on to become the Ugandan ambassador to Italy, based in Rome and recently became the Ugandan ambassador in New Delhi, India, supplying ambassadorial support across the whole Indian subcontinent.

== Literature ==
In 1992, her poem "Encounter" from her collection My Barren Song was included in Margaret Busby's Daughters of Africa, a selection of works from women authors in Africa.

== Works ==
- Iteso Thought Patterns in Tales, 1975
- My Barren Song. Dar es Salaam, Tanzania: Eastern African Publications, 1979
- Self Twice-Removed: Ugandan Woman, London: Change International Reports, 1982

== Personal life ==
Grace Akello married her husband, Hugh Mason, in 1983. They have four sons and have a family home in Uganda close to Kampala.
