= Vivian Glover =

American writer, educator and television producer (born 1947)

- Born: 1947 (age 78–79); Orangeburg, South Carolina, U.S.
- Education: Temple University; Universidad de las Américas Puebla
- Occupations: Writer, educator, television producer
- Employer: NBC News

Vivian Glover (born 1947) is an American writer, novelist, educator, and television producer from Orangeburg, South Carolina. She is network producer for NBC News and has worked for decades to cover stories for various television programs, including Nightly News, The Today Show, MSNBC, and CNBC.

== Early life ==
Glover was born in 1947 in Orangeburg, South Carolina. The Glover family relocated to Philadelphia in 1955, when Vivian was eight years old. The move was made in an attempt to remain safe after the family had received numerous threats related to Glover's father's involvement in the Civil Rights Movement. The Glover family later relocated once again to Camden, New Jersey, where Vivian graduated from high school. With the encouragement of her parents, who always emphasized the importance of education, Glover went on to attend Temple University in Philadelphia, and earned her bachelor's degree in mass communications in 1970. She then continued her education as an international communications student at the Universidad de Las Americas in Puebla, Mexico. While in the United States as a student, Glover worked part-time with young people in high crime areas of Philadelphia. This would ultimately pave the way for her chosen career path as an educator and producer of television news that covered stories about those from all walks of life.

== Professional career ==
Following her post-graduate studies, Glover began working for NBC in Washington, DC. This kickstarted her career as an international producer and writer. Two years after taking this milestone step, she was working as the producer of the seven o'clock evening shows. Thus ultimately expanding her career in entertainment and broadcasting.

In 1973, Glover moved to the Southern African nation of Botswana, where she organized and worked as the head of the first news department for radio in the country. Broadcasting daily and relevant news to citizens in both the native language of Southern Africa, Setswana, and English. During her four years spent in Southern Africa, Glover witnessed first hand the social injustices of the apartheid regime.

Vivian Glover continued her international travels in 1977 and moved to London, England, where she would reside for the next fifteen years. While in London, she furthered her literary skills and authored several pieces. In 1986, her first novel, The First Fig Tree, was published by Methuen Publishing. Through this publishing, Glover was nominated for the Booker Prize literary award in the first novel category. Additionally, in the U.S., the novel was a Book-of-the-Month Club alternate selection. The novel was well received, and an extract from it was included in Margaret Busby's 1992 anthology, Daughters of Africa, which compiles the contributions of more than two hundred women from the African diaspora.

Returning to Orangeburg in 1992, Glover was invited to teach at Claflin University and complete a work on the institution's history. She researched and wrote Men of Vision: Claflin College and Her Presidents, which was ultimately published as a tribute to the university's 125th anniversary.

Following her tenure at Claflin University, Glover resumed work as a news producer for NBC. She has been involved in some of the most significant story coverage in South Carolina and the United States. Her contributions include notable documentaries Shared History and The Marines of Montford Point, along with the stories of September 11th, Shannon Faulkner’s Citadel enrollment, Susan Smith and the trial, and the South Carolina confederate flag controversy.

She has also taken on a 14-part series called Tapestry of their Times, about older women in Orangeburg County, which has been published in The Times and Democrat.

Glover served as Director of Community Arts & Development at the Orangeburg County Fine Arts Center, and went on to chairs the Public Relations Committee of the South Carolina African American Heritage Commission.
