= Jane Tapsubei Creider =

Kenyan writer

- Born: c. 1940s Near Lake Nyanza, Kenya
- Citizenship: Kenya; Canada
- Occupations: Writer; artist; lexicographer; ethnographer
- Known for: Works on the Nandi language
- Notable work: Two Lives: My Spirit and I (1986)
- Spouse: Chet A. Creider

Jane Tapsubei Creider (born 1940s) is a Kenyan writer of memoir, fiction, and non-fiction, including articles and books co-authored with her husband Chet. A. Creider on the Nandi language. She is also an artist.

== Background ==
She had a traditional upbringing as a Nandi and grew up in Kenya near Lake Nyanza (formerly Lake Victoria), then after working in Kisumu and Nairobi she moved to live in Canada.

Her work as a writer include articles, short stories, a novel and memoir, her first book being the autobiography Two Lives: My Spirit and I, published in 1986. Two Lives tells of her upbringing as a member of the Nandi tribe, being educated by Christian missionaries, going to live in North America, before eventually marrying a Canadian professor, "The autobiography articulates two main cultural models of identity: the traditional Nandi identity, which is constituted by the spirit world of the ancestors and the extended family, and the autonomous individual, which is a European import into African culture. ... In creating the story of her life, Creider almost inadvertently shows how the contacts between two sometimes incommensurable models of identity have produced out of both modern and traditional materials the nomadic trickster/ethnographer she has become."

Creider's writing has been included in collections such as Daughters of Africa (1992), edited by Margaret Busby, and Fiery Spirits (1995), edited by Ayanna Black.

== Selected writings ==
- Two Lives: My Spirit and I – autobiography (London: The Women's Press, 1986)
- A Grammar of Nandi (with Chet A. Creider; Hamburg, 1989)
- The Shrunken Dream – novel (Toronto, 1993)
- A Dictionary of the Nandi Language (2001)
