= J. J. Phillips =

American poet (born 1944)

- Born: Jane J. Phillips; April 2, 1944 (age 82)
- Education: Immaculate Heart College
- Occupations: Poet and novelist
- Notable work: Mojo Hand (1966)
- Awards: American Book Award, Lifetime Achievement

Jane J. Phillips (born April 2, 1944), known as J. J. Phillips, is an African-American poet, novelist and civil rights activist. Her best known work is the novel Mojo Hand, first published in 1966, the story of a light-skinned upper-class young woman from San Francisco, California, who after hearing a record by bluesman Blacksnake Brown seeks him out and becomes embroiled in an ultimately tragic relationship with him.

== Biography ==
J. J. Phillips grew up in Los Angeles, California, in a progressive African-American family; her mother was a school teacher for 60 years, her father was Pasadena's first African-American attorney and real-estate developer. Phillips has said: "My immediate family was assimilated, atheist, and were for all intents and purposes indistinguishable from Caucasians in visage and speech."

Phillips studied at Immaculate Heart College, where as a freshman in 1962 she became interested in black roots music and travelled to Raleigh, North Carolina, to join the civil rights movement. She worked on a National Student Association voter-registration campaign and later joined a Congress of Racial Equality-sit-in at a Howard Johnson's restaurant, where she was arrested, spending 30 days in the county jail before returning to California. After reading The Country Blues by Samuel Charters, she listened to the music of Lightnin' Hopkins and determined to meet him, going with a roommate to Houston, Texas, to hear him play. She was expelled from Immaculate Heart College in January 1963, and has recalled: "I was extremely distraught. I wanted to be in school, but clearly the nuns didn't want me there. And soon after that I cam up with the idea to write a book that combined my fascination with Lightnin' with my abiding interest in herpetology, especially the blacksnake, which became the first name of the blues singer in Mojo Hand."

That debut novel, published in 1966, and reprinted 20 years later as Mojo Hand: An Orphic Tale (with restored Orphic references that were cut by the original publisher), has been characterised as a "blues lament in literary form". The Los Angeles Times reviewer wrote in 1986: "Mojo Hand anticipates the lessons of much recent black women's fiction--here, the women hold things together, often literally tying random moments of humor and beauty into an at least tolerable daily tapestry. Phillips' novel is true to its African and Greek antecedents, showing the uncanny links between musical, mystical and sexual intoxication. The moral ambiguities of these ties have rarely been so economically, knowingly, or eloquently portrayed as here." An extract from Mojo Hand was included in Margaret Busby's anthology Daughters of Africa, published in the 1990s. In 2015, the novel was described by Nat Hentoff as the "most neglected book I know of". In a New York Times retrospective in 2024, Sadie Stein called Mojo Hand a "genre-defying, wildly idiosyncratic, astounding novel":

It's the myth of Orpheus, told through the eyes of a Black teenager named Eunice Prideaux who becomes obsessed with the enigmatic blues singer Blacksnake Brown. Eunice more or less runs away from home to live with Brown in North Carolina; he's presumably decades older, and by turns cruel and indifferent. While from the time of publication Mojo Hand has had something of a cult following, it's never not been divisive. For everyone who has been struck by the book's sheer power and lyricism, the idiosyncrasy of its voice, who's praised it as a Black woman's Beat narrative or a sly work of civil disobedience, someone else has been shocked by its raw sexuality and by Blacksnake's casual abuse.... You could call this a coming-of-age story or a period piece or a tragedy, but that wouldn't be doing it full justice. This is a love letter to music, and specifically the blues.

== Influences ==
Phillips was interviewed by Alan Govenar for his 2010 book Lightnin' Hopkins: His Life and Blues, in which he discusses the fallacy that Mojo Hand is "thinly disguised autobiography" based on her affair with Lightnin' Hopkins. In speaking about the origins of Mojo Hand, and setting out to tell "a story of one person's journey from a non-racialized state to the racialized real world", as was happening to her, Phillips said:

"I realized that the perfect vehicle for effecting this was my own bluesy Orphic quest, which I developed after I had seen Marcel Camus's classic film Black Orpheus several times, and which led me to Lightnin'. The movie is a version of the story of Orpheus and Eurydice set in the black favelas of Rio during Mardi Gras. Classical mythology and herpetology were two things I'd been keenly interested in for as long as I can remember. In addition, I'd come under the influence of the existentialists and outlaw writers, such as Henry Miller, Genet, Sartre, as well as Richard Wright, and I was irresistibly drawn to the idea of the anti-hero and the bad boy in literature and life."

Her poem "Brautigan's Brains" was inspired by an experience she had when working in the manuscript division of Bancroft Library at the University of California, Berkeley, rough-sorting the papers of Richard Brautigan — which the library had acquired after his suicide — only to realize that she was handling the actual pages on which Brautigan had blown out his brains.

== Family papers ==
J. J. Phillips' papers are held at Emory University.

== Awards ==
- 2008 American Book Award, Lifetime Achievement

== Works ==
- Mojo Hand. Trident Press. 1966. Revised as Mojo Hand: An Orphic Tale (City Miner Books, 1985; Serpent's Tail, 1987).
- The Passion of Joan Paul II: A Pasquinade. Ishmael Reed Publishing Company. 1996. ISBN 978-0-918408-31-0.

Poems

- "Nigga in the Woodpile", in KONCH, Vol. 1, No. 2, pp. 32–34 (Spring, 1990).
  - Revised and published online in Konch (2008). Corrected and republished with an accompanying essay as Nigga in the Woodpile: A Rant (Serendipity Books, 2008).
- "Brautigan’s Brains" (2002). Later published online in Exquisite Corpse.
- "Lines Gleaned from the ŠÀ.ZI.GA", Exquisite Corpse.
- "Three Poems to the Eternal Beloved", Exquisite Corpse.
- "Throat Song: A Threnody for Ibrahim Qashoush", Exquisite Corpse.

Other

- Co-edited The Before Columbus Foundation Poetry Anthology: Selections from the American Book Awards, 1980-1990 (W. W. Norton & Company, 1992). ISBN 978-0-393-30833-4.
