= Amelia Blossom Pegram =

South African writer and performer (1935–2022)

- Born: 3 October 1935; Wynberg, Cape Town, South Africa
- Died: 11 April 2022 (aged 86); Louisville, Kentucky, U.S.
- Other name: Amelia Blossom House
- Education: University of Cape Town (BA); Guildhall School of Music and Drama; University of Louisville (MA)
- Occupations: Writer, performer, teacher

Amelia Blossom Pegram (3 October 1935 – 11 May 2022), also known as Amelia Blossom House, was a South African writer and performer, who began her working life as a teacher and was also an actor and model.

== Biography ==
She was born in Wynberg, Cape Town, South Africa, to Henry Bowman-Pegram and Evelyn Minnie West on 3 October, but there was a discrepancy as to the year of her birth. Pegram explained: "I was born in the spring time, and that's why my name is Blossom. Spring time in South Africa is October....I have two birth certificates, and that sounds kind of crazy, but one says '38, the other one says '35....It came about through record keeping in South Africa."

After graduating in 1961 from the University of Cape Town with a BA degree in history and English, she began a career as a teacher but in 1963 left South Africa for political reasons, eventually settling in London, England, where she studied drama at the Guildhall School of Music and Drama, later acting on stage, television, radio and in film.

In 1972, she moved to the United States, living and teaching in Fort Knox, and she earned a master's degree from the University of Louisville in 1977, writing her dissertation her dissertation on Dennis Brutus.

Her short stories, poems and essays have been published in many journals, among them Staffrider, Présence Africaine, Callalloo, The Gar, and Essence, and she read and performed her poetry internationally. She authored several books, including Our Sun Will Rise: Poems from South Africa (1989), and her writing is included in the anthology Daughters of Africa, edited by Margaret Busby (1992), and in Conversations with Kentucky Writers II (2015).

== Honours ==
Recognition that Pegram received for her work included a research grant from the Kentucky Foundation for Women, the Kwanzaa Honors List, Woman of the Year, the Louisville Board of Alderman Literary Award, inauguration into the Pan African Writers Association, and the South African Women for Women (SAWW) Arts and Literature award.

== Selected bibliography ==
- Checklist of Black South African Women Writers in English, 1980.
- Deliverance, 1986.
- Our Sun Will Rise: Poems for South Africa, 1989.
- Nelson Mandelamandla (with Cosmo Pieterse), 1989.
- Echoes Across a Thousand Hills, 1994.
- Beneath the Baobab, 2005.
