= Lourdes Teodoro =

Afro-Brazilian writer (born 1946)

- Born: Maria de Lourdes Teodoro; 4 June 1946 (age 79); Formosa, Goiás, Brazil
- Occupations: writer, poet, university professor and psychoanalyst
- Years active: 1986–present
- Known for: Afro-Brazilian studies

Lourdes Teodoro (born 4 June 1946) is an Afro-Brazilian academic, writer, poet and psychoanalyst. She studies the effects of colonization on identity.

== Biography ==
Maria de Lourdes Teodoro was born on 4 June 1946 in Formosa, Goiás, Brazil. In 1958, with the founding of Brasília, her family relocated there, where she completed her secondary education. From her youth, she began publishing poems in student journals and newspapers, including Correio Braziliense, and with a group of other students published the Antologia de Alunos Escritores do Elefante Branco (Anthology of Student Writers of the White Elephant) in 1966. After graduating from the University of Brasília with a degree in literature, she began teaching French and Literature at Centro Universitário de Brasília. In 1980, she began work on a doctorate at University of Paris III: Sorbonne Nouvelle in Paris on Comparative Literature, graduating in 1984 with a dissertation entitled Identités antillaise et brésilienne à travers les oeuvres d'Aimé Césaire et de Mario de Andrade (Antillian and Brazilian identities through the works of Aimé Césaire and Mário de Andrade). The work, like many of her tracts, evaluates the effects of slavery and racism on Afro-Brazilians.

After returning to Brazil, Teodoro taught as an adjunct Professor at the Arts Institute of the University of Brasília. In 1991 she began offering lectures in Africa, participating in seminars in Angola and Senegal. She helped with the founding of the Institute of Black Peoples in Burkino Faso, before moving to the United States. In 1996 Teodoro began graduate studies at Harvard University in African-American studies and psychoanalysis, which she completed in 1998. Her post-doctoral internship in childhood and adolescence psychopathology was completed at the psychiatry clinic of the University Hospital of Brasília.

Teodoro currently conducts academic research at the Instituto de Pesquisas e Estudos Afro-brasileiras (Institute for Research and Afro Brazilian Studies) in Rio de Janeiro and is practicing psychoanalyst. She is a member of the International Psychoanalytical Association and an associate member of the Brasília Psychoanalytic Society.

== Selected works ==
- with Heleno, Guido, Carlos Pontes, Reginaldo Fontele, et al., Antologia de Alunos Escritores do Elefante Branco (in Portuguese). Brasília, Brasil. 1966.
- Água-marinha ou Tempo sem palavra (in Portuguese). Brasília, Brasil: Distribuição, Livraria Galilei. 1978.
- "Dialogue". Présence Africaine (in French). 123 (3). Paris, France: 121. September 1982. ISSN 0032-7638.
- ""Moi, laminaire" ou la force de regarder demain... Vu du Brésil". Présence Africaine (in French). 126 (2). Paris, France: 24–26. June 1983. doi:10.3917/presa.126.0024. ISSN 0032-7638.
- Identités antillaise et brésilienne à travers les oeuvres d'Aimé Césaire et de Mario de Andrade (Ph.D.) (in French). Paris, France: Université de la Sorbonne Nouvelle. 1984.
- Fricote, swing: ensaio sócio-antropológico em ritmo de jazz (in Portuguese). Brasília, Brasil: Thesaurus Editora. 1986.
- with Bruce, Iain, "The Generation of Fear". The Black Scholar. 19 (4–5). San Francisco, California: Routledge: 51. July 1988. ISSN 0006-4246. Also in Margaret Busby (ed.), Daughters of Africa, London: Jonathan Cape, 1992, pp. 281–283, ISBN 0-224-03592-4.
- Flores de Goiás (in Portuguese). Brasília, Brasil: Autorin. 1994. ISBN 978-85-900102-1-0.
- Paysage en attente (in Portuguese). Brasília, Brasil: Autorin. 1995. ISBN 978-8-590-01022-7.
- Canções do mais belo incesto e poemas antigos (in Portuguese). Brasília, Brasil: Autorin. 1996.
- Modernisme brésilien et négritude antillaise: Mário de Andrade et Aimé Césaire (in French). Paris, France: Harmattan. 1999. ISBN 978-2-738-48027-9.
- Identidade Cultural e Diversidade Étnica – Négritude Africano-Antilhana e Modernismo Brasileiro (in Portuguese). Scortecci Editora, 2015. ISBN 978-85-366-4434-9.
- Identidades Culturais e Négritude Antilhana: Prática em Literatura Compartilhada (in Portuguese). Scortecci Editora, 2015. ISBN 978-85-366-4130-0.
