= Annie Burton =

African-American memoirist (born c. 1858)

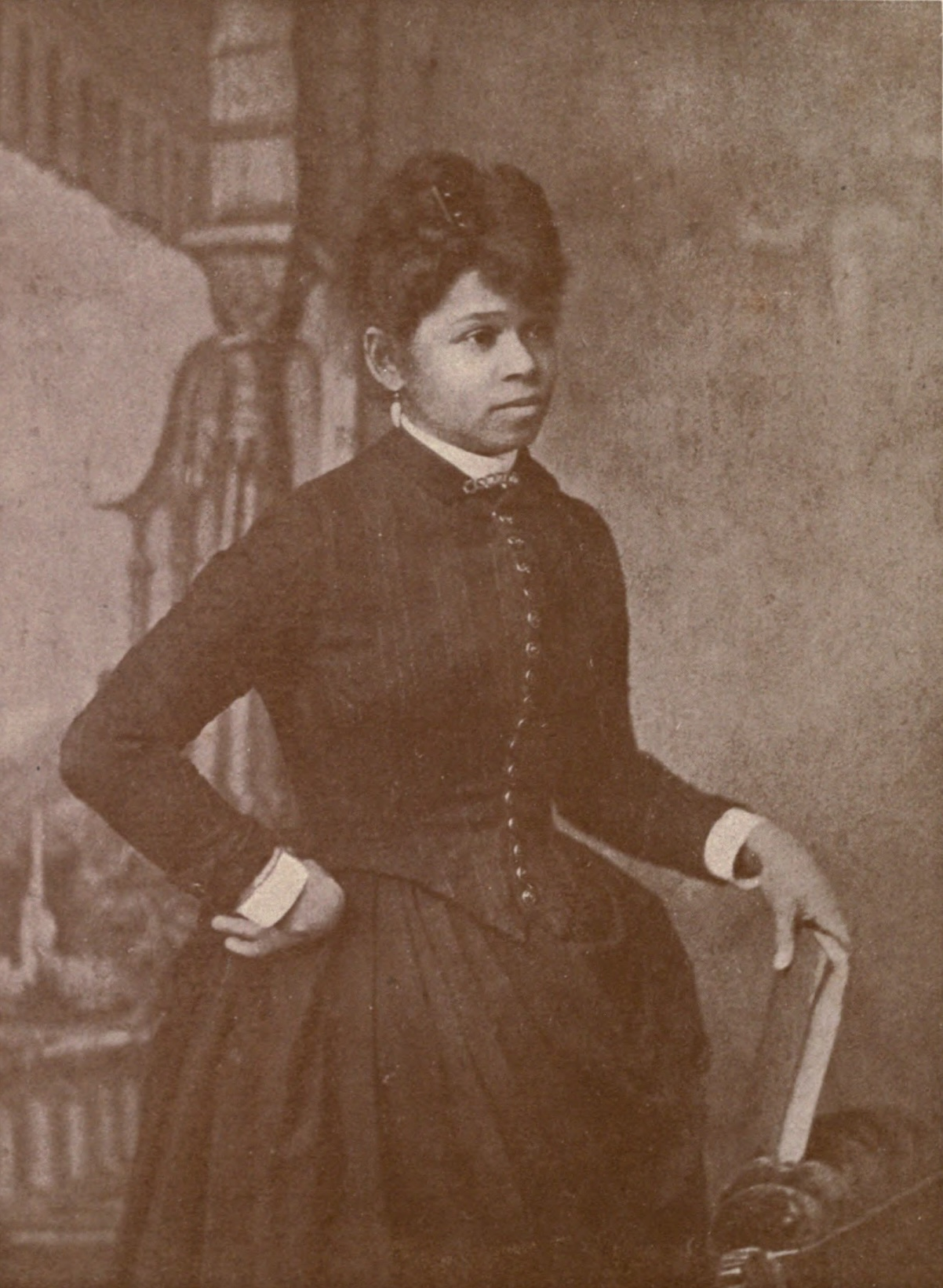
- Born: Annie Louise Burton c. 1858; Clayton, Alabama, U.S.
- Died: Unknown; U.S.
- Notable work: Memories of Childhood's Slavery Days (1909)

Annie L. Burton (c. 1858 – ?) was an African American memoirist, whose life story is captured in her 1909 autobiography and slave narrative Memories of Childhood's Slavery Days. Her date of death is uncertain.

== Biography ==
Annie Louise Burton was born into slavery on a plantation near Clayton, Alabama, and was liberated in childhood by the Union Army. Her father was a white man from Liverpool, England, who owned a nearby plantation and died in Lewisville, Alabama, in 1875.

Annie Burton's slave narrative

Moving North in 1879, she was among the earliest Black emigrants there from the South during the post-Civil War era, supporting herself in Boston and New York by working as a laundress and as a cook. In her autobiography, published in 1909, Burton relates that the end of slavery not only signaled a time for African Americans to start a new life, but also a time to redefine their lives as she described her own personal journey and how she was able to develop her own identity.

== Memories of Childhood's Slavery Days ==
Annie Burton documented her memories of her childhood in slavery near the end of the Civil War in her 1909 narrative Memories of Childhood's Slavery Days. Her book differs from other slave narratives of the time because she wrote it herself instead of allowing another author to write it for her.

This narrative is the autobiographical account of Annie Burton as she grows up enslaved in the United States. Burton recounts her life as a child on the plantation she was born on in Alabama. She has relatively pleasant and fond memories of her childhood. She was raised by her mistress after her mom escaped until she eventually returned and took her children back. Eventually, Burton learned how to read and write from her employer as she worked as a nanny. She moved to several different states including Massachusetts, Georgia, and Florida before returning to Boston, Massachusetts, and marrying her husband. In order to broaden her education, Burton attended classes at the Franklin Evening School and, from her learning, was inspired to write her autobiographical slave narrative. Overall, the narrative's focus is mainly on the happier memories of Burton's life as a slave, which differs from other slave narratives of the time that focused instead on the harsh realities and intense violence of being enslaved in the United States.

Burton is included in Margaret Busby's 1992 anthology Daughters of Africa.
