= Minna Salami =

Finnish Nigerian journalist (born 1978)

- Born: 1978 (age 47–48); Tampere, Finland
- Education: Lund University; SOAS University of London
- Known for: Journalist
- Notable work: Editor of MsAfropolitan.com
- Website: msafropolitan.com

Minna Salami (born 1978) is a Finnish Nigerian journalist and owner/editor of the website MsAfropolitan.com, which she created in 2010 to write on themes "ranging from polygamy to feminism to relationships". She was also a regular contributor to The Guardian and contributed two articles to Aljazeera.com. She is a member of the Global Educator Network of Duke University, the Africa Network and The Guardian Books Network.

== Biography ==
Born in Finland in 1978 to a Nigerian father and a Finnish mother, Salami lived in Nigeria during her youth before going to Sweden for higher studies. She graduated from Lund University, Sweden, with a Bachelor of Arts (BA) degree in Political Science, and from the University of London's School of Oriental and African Studies (SOAS) with a Master of Arts degree (MA). In 2016, she participated at the Hong Kong Baptist University International Writers' Workshop as a fellow. She is proficient in five languages and has lived in Nigeria, Sweden, Spain, New York and London. She now operates from London.

Initially, after her formal education, Salami started her career as a marketing business executive, dealing with branding and management of products, and working in many countries.

In 2010, she founded the blog MsAfropolitan, which deals with issues related to Nigeria and the diaspora on feminist issues. Concurrently, for two years until 2012, she also promoted the MsAfropolitan Boutique, in recognition of the African Women's Decade 2010–2020. This online boutique sold many heritage goods of Africa, manufactured by women of Africa. In an interview with the "Weekend Magazine", Salami elaborated on the objective of her establishing the Ms.Afropolitan blog, stated: "Blogs about African society were male-dominant and the feminist blogs I came across were Eurocentric. Most of the African feminist writing I encountered was either academic or fiction writing. It was brilliant work...but I longed to read popular cultural commentary about Africa from a feminist angle and commentary about feminism from an African angle." She is a contributor to the 2019 anthology New Daughters of Africa, edited by Margaret Busby.

In 2019, Salami joined the Activate Collective, an intersectional feminist movement that seeks to raise money for minoritised women political candidates and community activists. In 2020, the Activate Collective announced it would fund 11 women running for five different parties in the spring local and mayoral elections across five regions of England – London, the Midlands, North East, North West, and Yorkshire and Humber. The list includes eight women of colour, one disabled woman and one care leaver. Seven of the 11 women are from low-income households or identify as working-class.

Salami also works as a consultant, in the digital medium, to TVC News, a pan-African news channel. She is represented on the board of the UK charity For Books' Sake and a UK-based think tank.

Salami's first book Sensuous Knowledge: A Black Feminist Approach for Everyone was published in 2010 and her 2025 work Can Feminism Be African? was reviewed in Brittle Paper by Ainehi Edoro, who stated that "Can Feminism Be African? resists easy answers. It is part essay, part philosophical reflection, and very timely. In a world obsessed with metrics and fixes, Salami reminds us that African feminism can also be about resistance and world-building."

== Publications ==
- Sensuous Knowledge: A Black Feminist Approach for Everyone. Amistad. 2020. ISBN 978-0062877062.
- Can Feminism be African?. 2025. ISBN 978-0008559212.

== Rankings and awards ==
- "40 Under 40 Changemakers" by Applause Africa
- "Nigeria's 100 most influential women" by YNaija
- "Top 100 Most Influential Black People on Digital/Social Media" by Eelan Media.
- "Outstanding Achievement in Media" award in 2013, which is an Africa Diaspora Award
- Women 4 Africa 2013 "Blogger of the Year" award
- RED Magazine listed her as "Blogger of the Year" for 2012.
