= Mwana Kupona =

Swahili poet

Mwana Kupona binti Msham
- Born: Pate Island
- Died: c. 1865
- Occupation: Poet
- Years active: 19th century
- Known for: Utendi wa Mwana Kupona
- Spouse: Bwana Mataka
- Children: 2

Mwana Kupona binti Msham (born on Pate Island, died c. 1865) was a Swahili poet of the 19th century, author of a poem called Utendi wa Mwana Kupona ("The Book of Mwana Kupona"), which is one of the most well-known works of early Swahili literature.

Relatively little is known about her life. Her grandson Muhammed bin Abdalla reported in the 1930s that Mwana Kupona was born on Pate Island, and that she was the last wife of sheikh Bwana Mataka, ruler of Siu (or Siyu), with whom she had two children. Mataka died in 1856; two years later, Mwana Kupona wrote her famous poem, dedicated to her 14-year-old daughter Mwana Heshima. Mwana Kupona died around 1865 of uterine hemorrhaging.

== Utendi wa Mwana Kupona ==
The poem dates to about 1858 (year 1275 of the Islamic calendar), and is centered on the teachings and advice of Mwana Kupona to her daughter, concerning marriage and wifely duties. Despite the seemingly secular subject, the book is prominently religious and even mystical, and it has been compared to the Biblical Book of Proverbs. A few lines of the poem are dedicated to the author herself:

Swahili:	Translation:
Mwenye kutunga nudhumu Ni gharibu mwenye hamu Na ubora wa ithimu Rabbi tamghufiria Ina lake mufahamu Ni mtaraji karimu Mwana Kupona Mshamu Pate alikozaliwa Tarikhiye kwa yakini Ni alifu wa miyateni Hamsa wa sabini	The author of this work is a sorrowful widow her worst sin The Lord will forgive Know her name she is Reliant-of-the-Provider Mwana Kupona Mshamu born in Pate. The date in reality Is one thousand two hundred Seventy-five.

== References in culture ==
- The Kenyan writer and Swahili literature scholar Kitula King'ei published in 2000 a children's book entitled Mwana Kupona: Poetess from Lamu, based on the work and life of Mwana Kupona.

== See also ==
- Swahili literature
