= Nafissatou Niang Diallo =

Senegalese writer (1941–1982)

- Born: 11 March 1941; Dakar, Senegal
- Died: 1982 (aged 41)
- Citizenship: Senegalese
- Occupations: Writer and midwife
- Children: 6

Nafissatou Niang Diallo (11 March 1941 – 1982) was a Senegalese writer who wrote in French. After studying in Toulouse, France, she began writing. She was active in social services both as a midwife and as director of a maternal and child health centre, and describes in her writing both traditional and modern aspects of Senegalese society. Her autobiography De Tilène au Plateau, a Dakar childhood, published in 1975, was among the first works of literature to be published by a Senegalese woman, after which she published three novels before her early death at the age of 41.

== Biography ==
Born in Dakar, Senegal, she was brought up from infancy by her paternal grandmother after her mother's death. She attended the Champ de Course primary school at the age of seven and when she was 13 went to the Collège Moderne in Dakar, then at 16 to Van Vollenhoven high school. At 18 years of age, she enrolled at the State School for Midwives.

At the age of 23, she left Senegal to continue her studies in Toulouse for two years, after which she began writing. Her autobiography De Tilène au Plateau, a Dakar childhood was published in 1975, after which she wrote three novels.

She married Mambaye Diallo in 1961 and had six children. She died in 1982 at the age of 41.

== Bibliography ==
- De Tilène au Plateau, une enfance dakaroise. Dakar: Les Nouvelles Editions Africaines, 1975. Autobiography. ISBN 2-7236-0099-8. English translation by Dorothy Blair as A Dakar Childhood, 1982.
- Le Fort maudit [The Accursed Fort] Paris: Hatier, 1980 (125pp.). Novel. ISBN 2-218-05329-2
- Awa la petite marchande [Awa the little shopkeeper]. Paris: Les Nouvelles Editions Africaines, EDICEF, 1981 (143pp.). Novel. ISBN 2-85069-272-7
- La Princesse de Tiali, Dakar: Les Nouvelles Editions Africaines, 1987 (191pp.). Novel. ISBN 2-7236-0956-1. English translation (by Ann Woollcombe), Fary, Princess of Tlali, Washington: Three Continents Press, 1987; extracted in Daughters of Africa, ed. Margaret Busby, 1992.
