= Yung Suk Kim =

Korean-American biblical scholar

- Born: Daegu, South Korea
- Occupation: Professor

Academic background
- Education: Kyungpook National University, McCormick Theological Seminary
- Alma mater: Vanderbilt University
- Thesis: (2006)

Academic work
- Discipline: Biblical studies
- Institutions: Samuel DeWitt Proctor School of Theology Virginia Union University

Yung Suk Kim is a Korean-American biblical scholar.

== Education ==
Kim studied in Korean and American schools. Kim obtained a PhD in New Testament studies from Vanderbilt University in 2006, an M.Div. from McCormick Theological Seminary in 1999, and a B.A. from Kyungpook National University in 1985.

== Career ==
Kim is professor of New Testament and early Christianity at the Samuel DeWitt Proctor School of Theology at Virginia Union University. He was previously the editor of the Journal of Race, Ethnicity, and Religion.

== Biblical interpretation ==
Kim focuses on a holistic, inclusive, and socially engaged approach to interpreting the Bible. He takes into account the socio-cultural and historical contexts of biblical texts to understand how the context in which a text is written influences its meaning and relevance. Kim also advocates for interpreting the Bible through an intercultural lens, considering diverse cultural perspectives. He acknowledges that readers bring their cultural backgrounds to interpret biblical texts. Additionally, Kim’s interpretation emphasizes ethical implications and the potential for personal and social transformation. He explores how biblical teachings can be applied to contemporary ethical issues and social justice concerns. Kim believes that the reader plays a vital role in the interpretive process because the meaning of a text emerges through the interaction between the text and the reader, making the reader’s context and perspective crucial to interpretation. He encourages a critical examination of traditional interpretations and invites readers to reflect on their own biases and assumptions. This self-reflective approach aims to uncover deeper, often overlooked meanings in biblical texts.

== Academic works ==
=== Books ===
- Kim, Yung Suk (2008). Christ's Body in Corinth: The Politics of a Metaphor. Minneapolis, MN: Fortress. ISBN 978-0-800-66285-1. OCLC 214064342.
- ——— (2011). A Theological Introduction to Paul's Letters: Exploring a Threefold Theology of Paul. Eugene, OR: Cascade Books. ISBN 978-1-608-99793-0. OCLC 741342428.
- ——— (2013). Biblical Interpretation: Theory, Process, and Criteria. Eugene, OR: Pickwick. ISBN 978-1-610-97646-6. OCLC 827258714.
- ——— (2013). A Transformative Reading of the Bible: Explorations of Holistic Human Transformation. Eugene, OR: Cascade Books. ISBN 978-1-620-32221-5. OCLC 844786943.
- ——— (2014). Truth, Testimony, and Transformation: A New Reading of the "I Am" Sayings of Jesus in the Fourth Gospel. Eugene, OR: Cascade Books. ISBN 978-1-620-32222-2. OCLC 892344712.
- ——— (2014). Question Mark to the Bible, Sŏngsŏ e tŏnjinŭn murŭmp'yo: munhwa pip'yŏngjŏk Sŏngsŏ haesŏk kwa onŭl (Korean ed.). Seoul, Korea: DongYun. ISBN 978-8-964-47259-0. OCLC 946050635.
- ——— (2015). Resurrecting Jesus: The Renewal of New Testament Theology. Eugene, OR: Cascade Books. ISBN 978-1-498-21834-4. OCLC 918874341.
- ——— (2016). Messiah in Weakness: A Portrait of Jesus from the Perspective of the Dispossessed. Eugene, OR: Cascade Books. ISBN 978-1-4982-1745-3. OCLC 951927314.
- ———; Smith, Mitzi (2018). Toward Decentering the New Testament: A Reintroduction. Eugene, OR: Cascade. ISBN 9781532604652. OCLC 1027186617.
- ——— (2018). Reading Jesus' Parables with Dao De Jing: Appendix: A Translation of the Dao De Jing. Eugene, OR: Resource Publications. ISBN 9781532654916. OCLC 1056197715.
- ——— (2018). Jesus's Truth: Life in Parables. Eugene, OR: Resource Publications. ISBN 9781532643972. OCLC 1018459203.
- ——— (2019). Reimagining the Body of Christ in Paul's Letters: In View of Paul's Gospel. Eugene, OR: Resource Publications. ISBN 9781532677762. OCLC 1102799939.
- ——— (2019). Preaching the New Testament Again: Faith, Freedom, and Transformation. Eugene, OR: Cascade. ISBN 9781532652509. OCLC 1086334297.
- ——— (2019). Rereading Romans from the Perspective of Paul's Gospel: A Literary and Theological Commentary. Eugene, OR: Resource Publications. ISBN 9781532693090. OCLC 1122915937.
- ——— (2019). Rereading Galatians from the Perspective of Paul's Gospel: A Literary and Theological Commentary. Eugene, OR: Cascade. ISBN 9781532691126. OCLC 1127858898.
- ——— (2021). How to Read Paul: A Brief Introduction to His Theology, Writings, and World. Minneapolis, MN: Fortress. ISBN 9781506471440. OCLC 1226396985.
- ——— (2022). Monotheism, Biblical Traditions, and Race Relations. Cambridge: Cambridge University Press. ISBN 9781108984805. OCLC 1282600231.
- ——— (2024). How to Read the Gospels. Lanham, MD: Rowman & Littlefield. ISBN 9781538186084. OCLC 1412196584.
- ——— (2026). Justice and the Parables of Jesus: Interpreting the Gospel Stories Through Political Philosophy. London: T&T Clark. ISBN 9780567725356.
- ——— (2026). Treasures and Thorns: A Concise Critical Commentary on 2 Corinthians. Eugene, OR: Cascade. ISBN 9798385273362.

=== Edited books ===
- ———; Kim, Jin-Ho, eds. (2013). Reading Minjung theology in the twenty-first century: selected writings by Ahn Byung-Mu and modern critical responses. Eugene, OR: Pickwick. ISBN 978-1-610-97817-0. OCLC 858964624.
- Kim, Yung Suk, ed. (2013). 1 and 2 Corinthians. Minneapolis, MN: Fortress. ISBN 978-0-800-69935-2. OCLC 798615966.
- ———, ed. (2023). Paul's Gospel, Empire, Race, and Ethnicity: Through the Lens of Minoritized Scholarship. Eugene, OR: Pickwick. ISBN 978-1-666-73187-3. OCLC 1372346709.
- ———, ed. (2025). At the Intersection of Hermeneutics and Homiletics: Transgressive Readings for Transformational Preaching. Pickwick. ISBN 9781666774917.
