= Ayse Bircan =

Turkish activist and writer (born 1954)

- Born: 1954 (age 71–72); Turkey
- Education: Istanbul University
- Occupations: Activist and writer

Ayse Bircan (born 1954) is a Turkish activist and writer. As a young left-wing organizer in Turkey, she was targeted by authorities and fled to England, where her work has focused on refugee rights. Her essay "Black and Turkish" appears in the 1992 anthology Daughters of Africa.

== Early life and youth activism ==
Ayse Bircan was born in 1954. She grew up in Istanbul, Turkey.

Her great-grandfather had been bought as a slave by a Turkish pilgrim to Mecca, who brought him back to Turkey, freed him, and adopted him, raising him as one of his own children. Her mother was from the only black family in her village; she was told about a man who was also from the only black family in his village, and ran away to marry him. Bircan's father was self-educated and encouraged his children, including his daughters, to pursue education.

In 1971, she matriculated at Istanbul University, where she studied sociology. She did not complete her degree, however, after right-wing students took over the department.

As a student, Bircan became involved in socialist politics and women's rights activism. In 1975, she became editor of the newspaper Young Socialist. That same year, she helped organize İlerici Kadınlar Derneği, the Progressive Women's Organization, led by Beria Onger. Bircan worked for the organization in Bursa, where there was a high concentration of women textile workers.

She was also a founding member of the Turkish Peace Association.

== Government repression and self-exile ==
The Progressive Women's Organization was banned by the government after four years in operation. Bircan herself became a target for the authorities, and in 1979 she was tried and sentenced to six years in prison for her political work. She went into hiding instead, using false identities and moving frequently.

During a further crackdown on dissidents in 1983, she fled to self-exile in England. It was only after five years of pressure on the Turkish government that her young son was allowed to join her in London.

After settling in England, Bircan continued her activism, turning to refugee rights and support. She helped found the Turkish Community Center in London. She has also worked with the Hackney Refugee Training Consortium and the Imece Women’s Centre, as well as on outreach education with the Refugee Women's Association.

She was able to finally complete her sociology degree after returning to college in the U.K. in 1989.

Bircan has also worked as a journalist and writer. Her essay "Black and Turkish" was featured in the 1992 anthology Daughters of Africa, edited by Margaret Busby.

== Personal life ==
In 1975, she married a Kurdish fellow activist. The couple had one son.
