= Kate Drumgoold =

Formerly enslaved 19th-century African-American memoirist

Kate Drumgoold (born c. 1858 or 1859 – ?) was an American woman born into slavery around 1858 near Petersburg, Virginia. Her life is captured in her 1898 autobiography, A Slave Girl's Story, Being an Autobiography of Kate Drumgoold. It offers a message of racial uplift, faith, and education. "It is a rare portrait of a former slave who moved between the highly urbanized environment of New York City and the rural South."
