= Juliana Makuchi Nfah-Abbenyi =

Cameroon writer and academic

- Born: 1958 (age 66–67); Cameroon
- Occupation: Writer

== Background ==
Juliana Makuchi Nfah-Abbenyi (pen name, Makuchi) is a professor and writer from Cameroon. She is the first Beba woman to earn two doctorates. An alumna of the University of Yaoundé (BA, MA, Doctorate) and McGill University (Ph.D.), she taught at the University of Southern Mississippi before beginning her current position at North Carolina State University. As of 2016, she is the president of the African Literature Association.

Makuchi was born in 1958 in the South-West Province of Cameroon and grew up in the North-West Province. She received a BA in bilingual letters from the University of Yaounde, where she also did graduate studies in oral literature from 1979 to 1987. She moved to Montreal, Canada, in 1988 and to the United States in 1994. She has children, who she says "speak very little Beba."

== Selected works ==
- Gender in African Women’s Writing: Identity, Sexuality, and Difference (1997)
- Your Madness, Not Mine: Stories of Cameroon (1999)
- The Sacred Door and Other Stories: Cameroon Folktales of the Beba (2008)
- Reflections: An Anthology of New Works by African Women Poets (edited with Anthonia Kalu and Omofolabo Ajayi-Soyinka, 2013)
