= Agnès Agboton =

Beninese-Spanish writer, poet (born 1960)

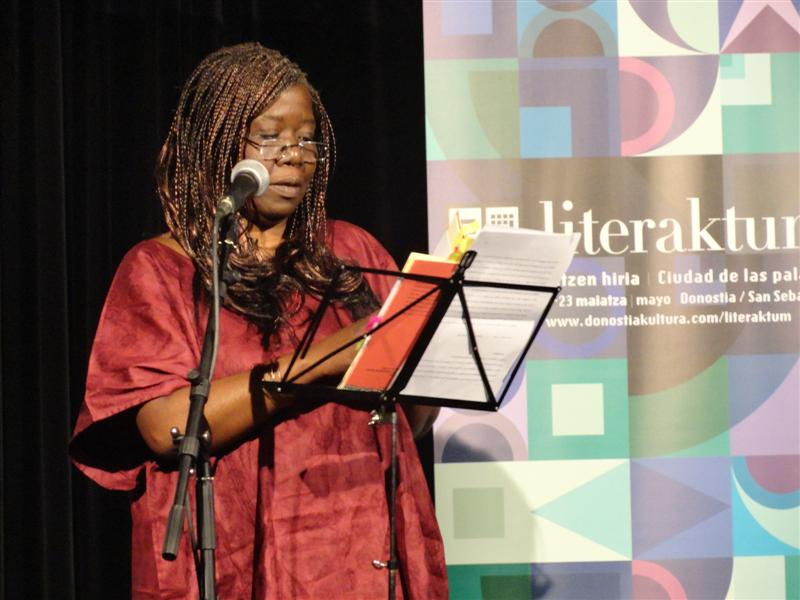
- Born: 1960 (age 65–66); Porto-Novo, Benin
- Education: University of Barcelona
- Occupations: Storyteller, writer
- Writing career
- Language: Gun language, Spanish, Catalan

Agnès Agboton (born 1960) is a Beninese writer, poet, storyteller, and translator. She currently lives in Spain. She is of Fon descent, and writes in several languages, including Catalan, Spanish, and the Gun language. She has written several books about African food and culture, and is known for her work in transcribing and translating Beninese folk tales and stories for adults and children. In addition, she has published two bilingual collections of poetry in the Gun language and Spanish. She is considered to be a significant figure in Afro-Spanish writing.

== Biography ==
Agboton was born in Porto-Novo, in Benin, West Africa, where she learned to write in her native Gun language, as well as in French. She initially studied at a Catholic school in Abomey, and later moved to the Ivory Coast to continue her education. She met her husband, Manuel Carrera, and moved with him to Catalania at the age of 18, in 1978, and studied Hispanic philology at the University of Barcelona, as well as learning Catalan and Spanish.

== Career ==
Agboton's work has been aimed at preserving oral storytelling traditions from Benin and Africa. Since 1990, she has worked in schools in Catalonia, teaching African stories, myths, and culture to students. She has published three collections of folktales from Benin and Africa, which she transcribed and translated from the original Gun language.

In 2005, she published an autobiographical book in Spanish, titled Más allá del mar de arena (Beyond the Sea of Sand) in which she recounted memories of her father, a school teacher and social worker in Benin. She has also written several books about African cuisine, and the role of women in the African household.

She has published two bilingual collections of poetry in the Gun language and Spanish: Canciones del poblado y del exilio (Songs of Village and of Exile, 2006) and Voz de las dos orillas ("Voice of the Two Shores", 2009). Lawrence Schimel's English translation of Voz de las dos orillas was listed as one of World Literature Today's 100 Notable Translations of 2021. Schimel also translated poems by her that were included in the 2019 anthology New Daughters of Africa (edited by Margaret Busby).

Agboton represented Benin at the 2012 Poetry Parnassus in London. She also performs Beninese folk tales as part of traditional oral storytelling traditions.

== Publications ==
- La cuina africana (1988) - non-fiction, on African cuisine ISBN 8-478-09048-7
- África en los fogones (2001) - co-authored with Eulàlia Sariola, non-fiction, on African cuisine ISBN 8-466-40042-7
- Las cocinas del mundo (2002) - non-fiction, on African cuisine
- Contes d'arreu del món (1995) - collection of African and Beninese folktales
- Na Mitón, the woman in African tales and legends (2004) ISBN 9-707-90287-6
- Eté Utú - Why in Africa things are what they are (2009)
- Zemi Kede - Eros in African oral tradition narratives (2011)
- Abenyonhú (2003) - collection of African and Beninese folktales ISBN 8-493-31018-2
- Más allá del mar de arena / Beyond the Sea of Sand (2005) - memoir ISBN 8-401-38673-X
- Canciones del poblado y del exilio (Songs of Village and of Exile, 2006) - poetry, bilingual in Gun and Spanish ISBN 8-483-30373-6
- Voz de las dos orillas (Voice of the Two Shores, 2009) - poetry, bilingual in Gun and Spanish ISBN 9-788-47785-8423
- Voice of the Two Shores (2023) - poetry, trilingual in Gun, Spanish and English ISBN 9-781-90523-3748
