= Margaret Wilkerson Sexton =

American novelist

- Born: New Orleans, Louisiana, United States
- Education: Dartmouth College; University of California at Berkeley
- Occupation: Novelist
- Notable work: A Kind of Freedom; The Revisioners
- Awards: NAACP Image Award

Margaret Wilkerson Sexton is an American novelist.

== Biography ==
Sexton was born and raised in New Orleans, Louisiana. She studied creative writing at Dartmouth College and law at the University of California at Berkeley.

She was a recipient of the Lombard Fellowship and spent a year in the Dominican Republic working for a civil rights organization and writing.

Her debut novel, A Kind of Freedom, made the New York Times "100 Notable Books" list, and the Editor's Choice list in 2017. Her second novel, The Revisioners, was named one of the most anticipated books of fall 2019 by Parade magazine.

Sexton won the First Novelist Award from the Black Caucus of the American Library Association, and the Crook's Corner Book Prize for A Kind of Freedom. She was also nominated for a 2017 National Book Award by the National Book Foundation.

At the 2020 NAACP Image Awards she was the winner in the Fiction category for her 2019 novel The Revisioners.
