= Zilpha Elaw =

American preacher, autobiographer (1790–1873)

- Born: c. 1790; Pennsylvania, U.S.
- Died: 1873 (aged 82–83); London, United Kingdom
- Known for: Christian itinerant preacher
- Notable work: Memoirs of the Life, Religious Experience, Ministerial Travels and Labours of Mrs. Zilpha Elaw, an American Female of Colour

Zilpha Elaw (c. 1790 – 1873) was an African-American preacher and spiritual autobiographer. She has been cited as "one of the first outspoken black women in the United States." Mitzi Smith suggests that Elaw and other Black women of the time such as Old Elizabeth used Pauline biblical texts to develop their own "politics of origins".

== Biography ==
Elaw was born in Pennsylvania, a free woman. Brought up in Philadelphia by a black and deeply religious family, after the death of her mother in 1802, she was sent to live with a Quaker family, Pierson and Rebecca Mitchell; her father died just two years later. After seeing a vision of Jesus, she joined a Methodist society in 1808, marrying Joseph Elaw and moving to Burlington, New Jersey, in 1811. The couple had a daughter, Rebecca, in 1812. In 1817, Elaw attended a revival camp for a week, and after falling into a trance, she gave her first ever public speech. She fell ill in 1819, and while remaining sick for two years, experienced an angelic visitation. After Joseph's death from consumption in 1823, Elaw opened a school for African-American children in Burlington, but increasingly believing she had been called upon as a minister, she departed in 1825 and went on a preaching mission among slaves in Maryland and Virginia. She became a traveling preacher, carrying her message and that of her Lord. During the period of 1827 to 1840, she ministered as an itinerant preacher in the United States, and was known to be in Nantucket in 1832.

Elaw moved to England, preaching in the summer of 1840. The 1841 census for England shows Elaw as living in Addingham, Yorkshire, states her occupation as "Itinerant Preacher" and that she is from foreign parts. Records show a Zilpha Elaw married a Ralph Bressey Shum at St Mary Stratford Church, Bow, Tower Hamlets, East London, England, on 9 December 1850. The record shows Zilpha Elaw as a widow, her father as Sancho Pancost and his profession as a butcher. The 1861 England census shows a Zilpha Shum as living in Turner Street, Tower Hamlets and her place of birth as America. The 1871 census for England shows a Zilpha Shum as living in Turner Street and having been born in Pennsylvania Bretton, U.S. She lived there and preached at least into the 1860s, penning Memoirs of the Life, Religious Experience, and Ministerial Travels and Labours of Mrs. Zilpha Elaw, an American Female of Colour in 1846. According to her memoirs, she preached more than 1,000 sermons in Great Britain over these years, but often faced hostility and heavy criticism from the Victorian British clergy, who believed that it was inappropriate for a woman to preach. It is unclear whether she returned to the US before her death. The London, England, City of London and Tower Hamlets Cemetery Registers, 1841–1966, show Zilpha Shum as being buried at Tower Hamlets Cemetery on 25 August 1873, having died aged 80 at Turner Street. She is buried in grave number E718.
