= Zandria Robinson =

American writer and scholar (born 1982)

Zandria Robinson PhD
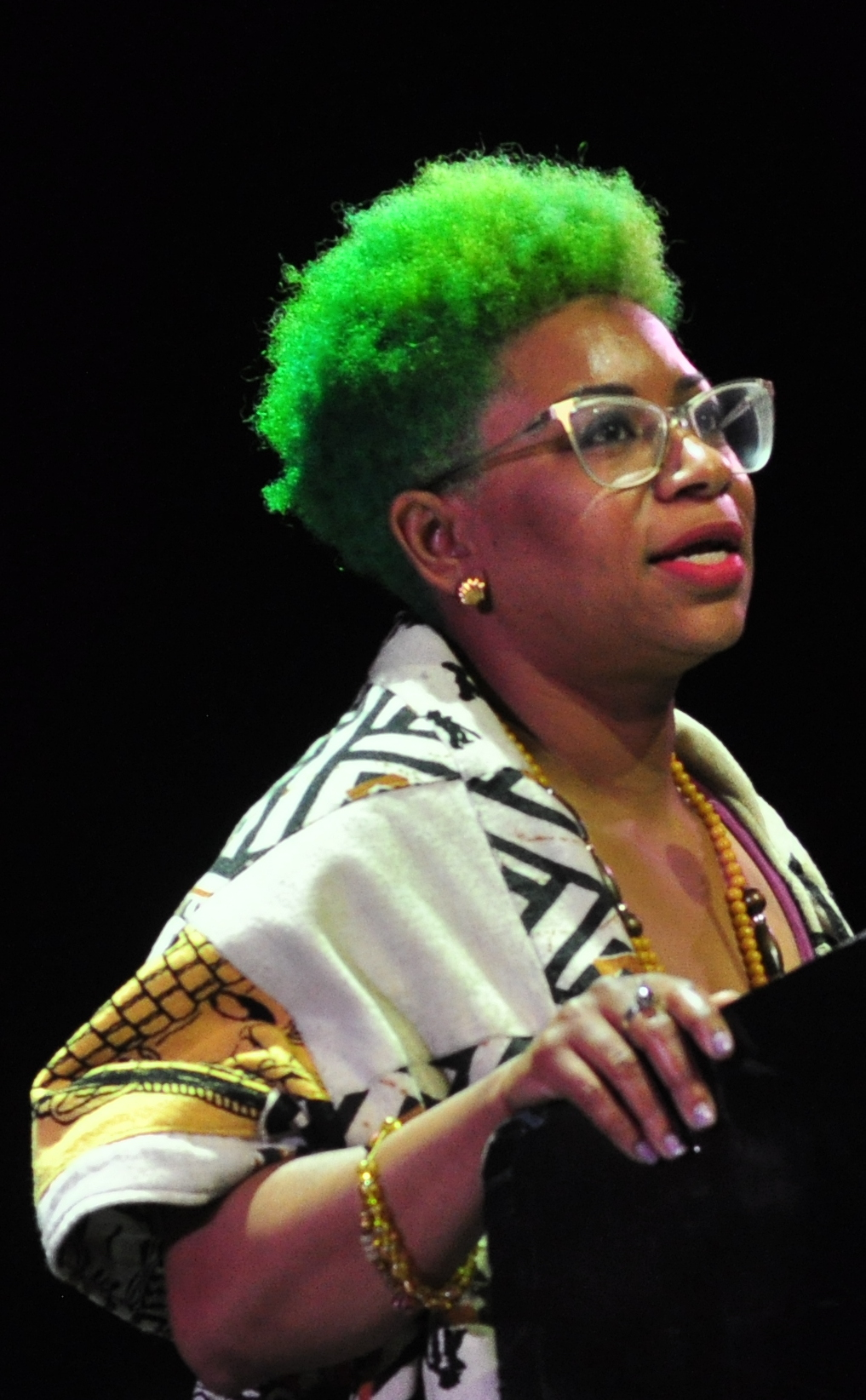
- Robinson in 2019
- Born: Zandria Felice Robinson; June 11, 1982 (age 44); Memphis, Tennessee, US
- Occupations: Scholar, writer
- Spouse(s): Tauheed Rahim II, m. 2014
- Children: 2

Academic background
- Education: University of Memphis, BA Northwestern University, PhD

Academic work
- Discipline: Sociologist
- Sub-discipline: Racial politics, Black American culture, the American south
- Institutions: Georgetown University
- Website: https://newsouthnegress.com/

Zandria Felice Robinson (born June 11, 1982) is an American writer and scholar. Her work focuses on popular music, ethnography, and race and culture in the American south. She is the author of two books: This Ain't Chicago: Race, Class, and Regional Identity in the Post-Soul South (2014) and Chocolate Cities: The Black Map of American Life (2018). Robinson is an associate professor of African-American studies at Georgetown University.

== Early life and education ==
Robinson was born in Memphis, Tennessee, and raised in the city's East Whitehaven Park neighborhood. She received her bachelor's degree and master's degree in sociology from University of Memphis, and later received her doctoral degree in sociology from Northwestern University.

== Career ==
Robinson returned to Memphis after receiving her degree to work briefly as an adjunct at University of Memphis. She then worked for three years as a tenure-track professor at University of Mississippi. Robinson then returned to University of Memphis, where she remained for six years. In 2015, she accepted a position at Rhodes College. She joined the faculty at Georgetown University as an associate professor in the department of African-American studies in 2019.

Robinson's first book, titled This Ain't Chicago: Race, Class, and Regional Identity in the Post-Soul South, was published in 2014 by UNC Press. The book uses interviews with African Americans who live in Memphis and "critiques ideas of black identity constructed through a northern lens and situates African Americans as central shapers of contemporary southern culture." She received the Eduardo Bonilla-Silva Award for the book.

Her second book, co-authored with Marcus Anthony Hunter, is called Chocolate Cities: The Black Map of American Life. Published in 2018 by University of California Press, the authors "present an alternative cartography of the United States, a "Black map" — showing how Black people and culture have shaped what we know as American culture".

She is a contributor to the 2019 anthology New Daughters of Africa, edited by Margaret Busby.

=== Twitter statements and mistaken firing ===
In 2015, Robinson received backlash over her tweets related to white students' perceptions that Black college students are admitted due to their race, and statements related to criticism of the Confederate flag. The story was picked up by conservative media outlets such as The Daily Caller and many people called for her to be fired. Shortly after, the University of Memphis tweeted that Robinson was no longer employed at the university. The statement led many to believe she had been dismissed. In response, over 100 Black scholars circulated a letter that "argue[d] that black scholars are at particular risk right now, when campuses are rife with heightened surveillance by disgruntled students and administrators unwilling or unable to go to bat for faculty." It was later announced that Robinson had already accepted a position at another university, which the University of Memphis had not stated in their initial tweet.

== Personal life ==
Robinson married artist and musician Marco Pavé, né Tauheed Rahim II, in 2014. She has two children: Assata (born 2003), a daughter from a previous relationship; and Jordan (born 2013), a son from Rahim’s previous relationship .
