= Mattie J. Jackson =

Mattie Jane Jackson (January 1847–February 5, 1910) was an African American author. She is known for her 1866 autobiography and slave narrative The Story of Mattie J. Jackson: Her Parentage, Experience of Eighteen Years in Slavery, Incidents During the War, Her Escape from Slavery: A True Story, which contributed to the national knowledge of African American family life during slavery and the Reconstruction era. Her autobiography presents the history of multi-generational familial relationships and their inner strength, despite repeated, forced separation. A copy of the manuscript is held in trust at the University of North Carolina, Chapel Hill.

== Personal background ==
Mattie Jane Jackson was born in January 1847 in St. Louis, Missouri. She was the daughter of Westley Jackson and Ellen Turner. Despite being enslaved by different owners, her parents had three children together, including Sarah Ann (who died during childhood), Mattie Jane, and Esther J. (later Mrs. Charles Diggs of St. Louis; 1850–1920)

After the birth of his youngest daughter, Westley Jackson escaped slavery through the Underground Railroad. He then lived in Chicago, Illinois, where he became a "Minister of the Gospel" and "died before the War," as his daughter would remember. Six years later, Ellen Turner met and married George Brown, and together they had two sons (one would die as a baby). Brown escaped to Canada around 1855; he changed his name to John G. Thompson and become a barber in the city of Lawrence, Massachusetts. After Brown's escape, Turner tried several times to join her husband, but was repeatedly caught and beaten. Soon her enslaver, tired of her constant attempts to escape, sold her and her children to the captain of a Mississippi River steamboat.

When Ellen met one Sam Adams and made preparations to marry, the steamboat captain kidnapped the family and sent them to Louisville, Kentucky, where they were sold to different enslavers. Mattie, with the help of the Underground Railroad escaped to Indianapolis, Indiana, where her mother and brother were able to reach her several months later. Upon the end of the American Civil War, Mattie and her mother and brother returned to St. Louis, where Ellen married Sam Adams.

Shortly after the end of the war, Jackson's stepfather, now known as John G. Thompson, located the family and invited Jackson and her 11-year-old half-brother to join him and his wife, Dr. Lucy Susan (Prophet) Schuyler Thompson, a botanical physician and antislavery activist. At the time she arrived in Lawrence in April 1866, Mattie could read a little bit, but could not write at all, and was interested in continuing her education. Her stepmother took down the story of Mattie's life to date; Dr. Thompson also saw to its publication, with its primary purpose being to raise money that Mattie could use to further her education. In her preface Mattie said: "I feel it a duty to improve the mind, and have ever had a thirst for education to fill that vacuum for which the soul has ever yearned since my earliest remembrance. Thus I ask you to buy my little book to aid me in obtaining an education, that I may be enabled to do some good in behalf of the elevation of my emancipated brothers and sisters."

Mattie Jackson eventually returned to St. Louis, where, on July 27, 1869, she married William Reed Dyer (1846–1912), a Union Army veteran and porter on Mississippi River steamboats. Of their nine children, five lived to maturity. After Ellen Turner Adams' death in May 1893, the Dyers moved to Dardenne Prairie, Missouri, about 35 miles from St. Louis, where they would live for the rest of their lives.

== Published works ==
- Jackson, Mattie J. The Story of Mattie J. Jackson: Her Parentage, Experience of Eighteen Years in Slavery, Incidents During the War, Her Escape from Slavery: A True Story, at Documenting the American South.
