= Burcu Bircan =

Turkish volleyball player (born 1988)

Personal information
- Full name: Burcu Bircan
- Born: June 14, 1988 (age 38); Turkey
- Height: 1.85 m (6 ft 1 in)

Volleyball information
- Position: Outside hitter
- Current club: Yeşil Bayamiçspor
- Number: 12

Career
Years	Teams
-2009; 2009-2010; 2010; 2014-2015; 2015-...	Beylikdüzü; Galatasaray Medical Park; Çanakkale Belediye; Salihli Belediyespor; Yeşil Bayamiçspor

National team
Turkey

Burcu Bircan (born June 14, 1988) is a Turkish volleyball player. She is 186 cm tall and plays as an outside hitter. Burcu plays for Yeşil Bayamiçspor.

== Career ==
Bircan played for Galatasaray Medical Park in the 2009/10 season. She then played in 2010 for Çanakkale Belediye For the 2014/15 she played for Salihli Belediyespor. and for Yeşil Bayamiçspor for the 2015/16 season.

== See also ==
- Turkish women in sports
