= Yvonne Denis Rosario =

Afro-Puerto Rican writer and professor (born 1967)

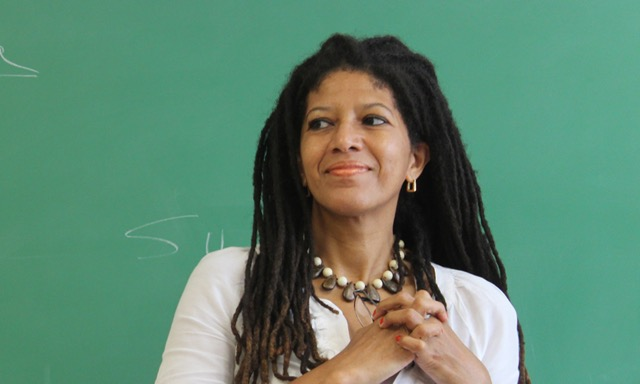
- Born: March 9, 1967 (age 59); San Juan, Puerto Rico
- Education: University of Puerto Rico-Río Piedras; InterAmerican University of Puerto Rico
- Occupations: Writer and professor
- Employer: University of Puerto Rico, Rio Piedras
- Website: yvonnedenis.com

Yvonne Denis Rosario (born March 9, 1967) is an Afro-Puerto Rican storyteller, poet, librettist, columnist and academic. A former president of the Puerto Rican PEN International Centre, she is also a professor at the University of Puerto Rico, Rio Piedras campus.

== Biography ==
Yvonne Denis Rosario was born in San Juan, Puerto Rico, on March 9, 1967, one of the seven children of Alejandrina Rosario Román, a public employee, and Juan Denis Estrada, a dry-cleaning business owner. Her maternal great-grandmother, Josefa "Maita" Osorio Villarán (1860–1953), had been kidnapped from Benin, West Africa, and enslaved in Puerto Rico, before achieving her freedom.

Denis Rosario attended Luz América Calderón high school in Carolina, Puerto Rico, graduating in 1984. She went on to earn a Paralegal Studies certificate in 1995 at the University of Puerto Rico-Río Piedras (UPR-RP), a Criminal Justice B.A. degree from the InterAmerican University of Puerto Rico (2005), and a Creative Literature M.A. from the Universidad del Sagrado Corazón in 2008. She also has a Ph.D. in Puerto Rican and Caribbean Literature from the Center for Advanced Studies on Puerto Rico and the Caribbean.

Since 2006, she has been writing professionally and her books, which have been translated into many languages, include Capá Prieto, Bufé, Delirio Entrelazado, and Sepultados. Her publications examine issues of race and racism in Puerto Rico. Capá Prieto, her 2009 debut collection of short stories, was described in the Afro-Hispanic Review as a "literary tour de force".

Denis Rosario is a contributor to the 2019 anthology New Daughters of Africa, edited by Margaret Busby.

Honours she has received include the Nacional Instituto de Literatura Puertorriqueña Award and the Fifth International Prize Award of Journalism and Literature.

Denis Rosario is a former president of the Puerto Rican PEN International Centre (2012–13). She has been a guest columnist for El Nuevo Día newspaper, has taught at Ana G. Méndez University and at Metropolitan University, and since 2015 has taught at UPR-RP, where she is a professor of literature.

== Bibliography ==
- Capá Prieto (short stories), San Juan: Isla Negra Editores, 2009
- Bufé (novel), San Juan: Isla Negra Editores, 2012
- Delirio Entrelazado (poetry), Editorial EDP University, 2015
- Sepultados, Editorial EDP, 2018
