= Old Elizabeth =

African-American Methodist minister and former slave (c.1766–1866)

Elizabeth (c. 1766 – June 11, 1866) was an African-American Methodist preacher and former slave. She orated a popular slave narrative about her life, titled Memoir of Old Elizabeth, A Colored Woman, which primarily discussed her faith. It has been referred to as "one of the most remarkable full-length antebellum slavewomen's narratives".

== Biography ==
In 1766, Elizabeth was born into slavery in Maryland. Growing up in a Methodist family, she heard the Bible read regularly in the home. She was separated from her family by her master at 11 years of age; her mother encouraged her to look to God. At the age of 30, Elizabeth was given her freedom by a woman who had purchased her. At the age of 42, she began giving sermons in Baltimore, Maryland; often to multiracial congregations. The popularity of her unusual ministry led her to make travels to Virginia, Michigan, Canada, and Pennsylvania. Following her harassment by authorities in Maryland and Virginia, Elizabeth resided in Michigan for four years where she assisted in the founding of a schoolhouse for Black orphans. Her travels brought her in connection with the Quaker community.

Elizabeth never married, had no children, and never took a surname. In her later years, she fell ill from a severe gangrene infection of her legs. While receiving care from Quakers in Pennsylvania at the age of 97, Elizabeth orated her slave narrative. Memoir of Old Elizabeth, A Colored Woman was published in 1863. Elizabeth died of gangrene on June 11, 1866. Her memoir was republished in 1889 under the title Elizabeth, A Colored Minister of the Gospel, Born in Slavery. Her story focuses less on her time as a slave and even her identity, unlike some other slave narratives, and primarily on her spiritual journey.

== See also ==
- Zilpha Elaw (c. 1790 – 1873), African American itinerant preacher
