= List of black British writers =

This list of black British writers includes those born in or associated with the UK.

== A ==
- Michael Abbensetts (1938–2016)
- Levi David Addai (living)
- Diran Adebayo (born 1968)
- Sade Adeniran (born 1960s)
- Lola Adesioye (living)
- Hakim Adi (living)
- Zoe Adjonyoh (born late 1970s)
- Rhammel Afflick (born 1994)
- John Agard (born 1949)
- Sandra Agard (living)
- Patience Agbabi (born 1965)
- Bola Agbaje (born 1981)
- Toyin Agbetu (living)
- Yemi Ajibade (1929–2013)
- Kehinde Andrews (born 1983)
- Joan Anim-Addo (living)
- Raymond Antrobus (born 1986)
- Dean Atta (living)
- Caleb Azumah Nelson (born 1993)

== B ==
- Bolu Babalola (born 1991)
- Yaba Badoe (born 1955)
- Imruh Bakari (born 1950)
- Biyi Bandele (1967–2022)
- Francis Barber (?–1801)
- Kurt Barling (born 1961)
- Simi Bedford (living)
- Linda Bellos (born 1950)
- Floella Benjamin (born 1949)
- Jay Bernard (born 1988)
- James Berry (1924–2017)
- Hannah Black (living)
- Malorie Blackman (born 1962)
- Valerie Bloom (born 1956)
- Paul Boakye (living)
- JJ Bola (living)
- Malika Booker (born 1970)
- Lloyd Bradley (born 1955)
- E. R. Braithwaite (1912–2016)
- Jean "Binta" Breeze (1956–2021)
- Petronella Breinburg (1927–2019)
- Yvonne Brewster (1938–2025)
- Constance Briscoe (born 1957)
- Esther Bruce (1912–1994)
- Nathan Bryon (born 1991)
- Victoria Adukwei Bulley (living)
- Barbara Burford (1944–2010)
- Elizabeth-Jane Burnett (living)
- Margaret Busby (living)

== C ==
- Candice Carty-Williams (born 1989)
- Gus Casely-Hayford (born 1964)
- Eddie Chambers (born 1960)
- Faustin Charles (born 1944)
- Helen (charles) (living)
- Kayo Chingonyi (born 1987)
- Michaela Coel (born 1987)
- Merle Collins (born 1959)
- Ottobah Cugoano (c. 1757–after 1791)
- Melissa Cummings-Quarry (living)
- Patricia Cumper (born 1954)

== D ==
- Fred D'Aguiar (born 1960)
- David Dabydeen (born 1955)
- Stella Dadzie (born 1952)
- Yrsa Daley-Ward (born 1989)
- Benjamin Dean (born 1993)
- Ferdinand Dennis (born 1956)
- Ebou Dibba (1943–2000)
- Anni Domingo (born 1950s)
- Sareeta Domingo (1980–2025)
- Michael Donkor (born 1985)
- Nah Dove (born 1940s)

== E ==
- Reni Eddo-Lodge (born 1989)
- Yvvette Edwards (living)
- Zena Edwards (born 1960s)
- Obi Egbuna (1938–2014)
- Inua Ellams (born 1984)
- Buchi Emecheta (1944–2017)
- Cecile Emeke (living)
- Olaudah Equiano (c. 1745–1797)
- Ekow Eshun (born 1968)
- Kodwo Eshun (born 1967)
- Melanie Eusebe (born 1977)
- Diana Evans (born 1972)
- Bernardine Evaristo (born 1959)

== F ==
- Kehinde Fadipe (born 1983)
- Femi Fadugba (born 1987)
- Aminatta Forna (born 1964)
- Peter "Flip" Fraser (1951–2014)
- Pam Fraser Solomon (living)
- Lorna French (living)

== G ==
- Mike Gayle (born 1970)
- Gabriel Gbadamosi (born 1961)
- Jessica George (living)
- Beryl Gilroy (1924–2001)
- Paul Gilroy (born 1956)
- Martin Glynn (born 1957)
- Salena Godden (living)
- Paul Goodwin (living)
- Colin Grant (born 1961)
- debbie tucker green (living)
- Bonnie Greer (born 1948)
- Norma Gregory (born 1969)
- Ukawsaw Gronniosaw (c. 1705–1775)

== H ==
- Stuart Hall (1932–2014)
- Leila Hassan (born 1948)
- Victor Headley (born 1959)
- Julian Henriques (born 1951)
- Lenny Henry (born 1958)
- Talia Hibbert (living)
- Ashley Hickson-Lovence (born 1991)
- Donald Hinds (1934–2023)
- Afua Hirsch (born 1981)
- Jo Hodges (1959–2017)
- Zita Holbourne (born 1960s)
- Darcus Howe (1943–2017)
- Marsha Hunt (born 1946)
- Ben Hunte (born 1992)

== I ==
- Khadijah Ibrahiim (living)
- Theresa Ikoko (living)
- Kenny Imafidon (born 1993)
- Inaya Folarin Iman (born 1996)
- Thompson Iyamu (born 1968)

== J ==
- Sharna Jackson (living)
- Charlene James (living)
- C. L. R. James (1901–1989)
- Lennie James (born 1965)
- Delia Jarrett-Macauley (born 1958)
- Danielle Jawando (living)
- John Jea (1773–after 1817)
- Gus John (born 1945)
- Amryl Johnson (1944–2001)
- Catherine Johnson (born 1962)
- Linton Kwesi Johnson (born 1952)
- Claudia Jones (1915–1964)
- Evan Jones (1927–2012)
- Darren Jordon (born 1960)
- Anthony Joseph (born 1966)
- Paterson Joseph (born 1964)

== K ==
- Jackie Kay (born 1961)
- Oonya Kempadoo (born 1966)
- Peter Kempadoo (1926–2019)
- Roshini Kempadoo (born 1959)
- Jeffrey Kerr-Ritchie (born 1960)
- Don Kinch (died 2024)
- Dorothy Koomson (born 1971)
- Kwame Kwei-Armah (born 1967)

== L ==
- John La Rose (1927–2006)
- George Lamming (1927–2022)
- Patrice Lawrence (born 1960s)
- Marcia Layne (living)
- Kevin Le Gendre (living)
- Nicôle Lecky (living)
- Carol Leeming (born 1957)
- Andrea Levy (1956–2019)
- Gail Lewis (born 1951)
- Lynette Linton (born 1990)
- Errol Lloyd (born 1943)
- Lesley Lokko (living)
- Adam Lowe (born 1985)
- John Lyons (born 1933)

== M ==
- Karen McCarthy Woolf (born 1960s)
- Adewale Maja-Pearce (born 1953)
- Nick Makoha (living)
- Sarah Ladipo Manyika (born 1968)
- E. A. Markham (1939–2008)
- Una Marson (1905–1965)
- S. I. Martin (born 1961)
- Valerie Mason-John (born 1962)
- Mustapha Matura (1939–2019)
- Val McCalla (1943–2002)
- Moses McKenzie (born 1998)
- Jenny McLeod (born 1963)
- Michael McMillan (born 1962)
- Paul Mendez (born 1982)
- Kobena Mercer (born 1960)
- Bridget Minamore (born 1991)
- Dreda Say Mitchell (born 1965)
- Nadifa Mohamed (born 1981)
- Shujaa Moshesh (living)
- Shola Mos-Shogbamimu (born 1975)

== N ==
- Courttia Newland (born 1973)
- Grace Nichols (born 1950)
- Onyi Nwabineli (living)

== O ==
- Michael Obiora (born 1986)
- Tolu Ogunlesi (born 1982)
- Chioma Okereke (living)
- Irenosen Okojie (living)
- Ben Okri (born 1959)
- Musa Okwonga (born 1979)
- Victor Oladokun (living)
- Lola Olufemi (born 1996)
- David Olusoga (born 1970)
- Rageh Omaar (born 1967)
- Nuzo Onoh (born 1962)
- Onyeka (living)
- Diriye Osman (born 1983)
- Sharon Dodua Otoo (born 1972)
- Tomiwa Owolade (born 1996)
- Derek Owusu (born 1988)
- Helen Oyeyemi (born 1984)

== P ==
- Annie Yellowe Palma (born 1962)
- Rianna Jade Parker (born 1991)
- Ripley Parker (born 2000)
- Nii Parkes (born 1974)
- Cass Pennant (born 1958)
- Caryl Phillips (born 1958)
- Mike Phillips (born 1941)
- Trevor Phillips (born 1953)
- Woodrow Phoenix (living)
- Winsome Pinnock (born 1961)
- Hannah Pool (born 1974)
- Mary Prince (1788–after 1833)

== R ==
- Ravinder Randhawa (born 1952)
- Barry Reckord (1926–2011)
- Advolly Richmond (born 1966)
- Joan Riley (born 1958)
- Na'ima B. Robert (born 1977)
- Calvin Robinson (born 1985)
- Roger Robinson (living)
- Nicola Rollock (living)
- Jacob Ross (born 1956)
- Leone Ross (born 1969)
- Jacqueline Rudet (born 1962)
- Shane Ryan (born 1969)

== S ==
- Layla Saad (living)
- Amon Saba Saakana (living)
- Michael Salu (living)
- Ignatius Sancho (c. 1729–1780)
- June Sarpong (born 1977)
- Mary Seacole (1805–1881)
- Sam Selvon (1923–1994)
- Kadija Sesay (born 1962)
- Warsan Shire (born 1988)
- Andra Simons (living)
- Lemn Sissay (born 1967)
- Dorothea Smartt (born 1963)
- Zadie Smith (born 1975)
- Ade Solanke (living)
- Frances-Anne Solomon (born 1966)
- Paula B. Stanic (living)
- Nick Stone (born 1966)
- Andrea Stuart (born 1962)
- SuAndi (born 1951)
- Maud Sulter (1960–2008)
- Yinka Sunmonu (born 1962)
- Luke Sutherland (born 1971)

== T ==
- Daniel Lawrence Taylor (living)
- Marvin Thompson (living)
- Tade Thompson (living)
- Yvonne Thompson (living)
- Toni Tone (living)
- Shoggy Tosh (born 1974)
- Joanna Traynor (living)
- Carol Tulloch (living)
- Kwajo Tweneboa (born 1988)

== U ==
- Catherine Ugwu (born 1964)
- Yesomi Umolu (born 1983/1984)

== V ==
- Ivan Van Sertima (1935–2009)
- Patrick Vernon (born 1961)
- Shola von Reinhold (living)

== W ==
- Kit de Waal (born 1960)
- Marc Wadsworth (living)
- Jackie Walker (born 1954)
- Jools Walker (living)
- Onyekachi Wambu (born 1960)
- Robert Wedderburn (1762–1835/1836?)
- Yvonne Weekes (living)
- Alex Wheatle (1963–2025)
- Verna Wilkins (born 1943)
- Francis Williams (ca. 1700–1770)
- Henry Sylvester Williams (1867 or 1869–1911)
- Roy Williams (born 1968)
- Doirean Wilson (living)
- T-Bone Wilson (living)
- Ken Wiwa (1968–2016)
- Ansel Wong (born 1945)
- Trix Worrell (born 1959)

== Y ==
- Henry Redhead Yorke (1772–1813)
- Gary Younge (born 1969)

== Z ==
- Benjamin Zephaniah (1958–2023)

== See also ==
- Black British people
