= Deirdre Osborne =

Australian-born academic

Deirdre Osborne Hon. FRSL FRSA
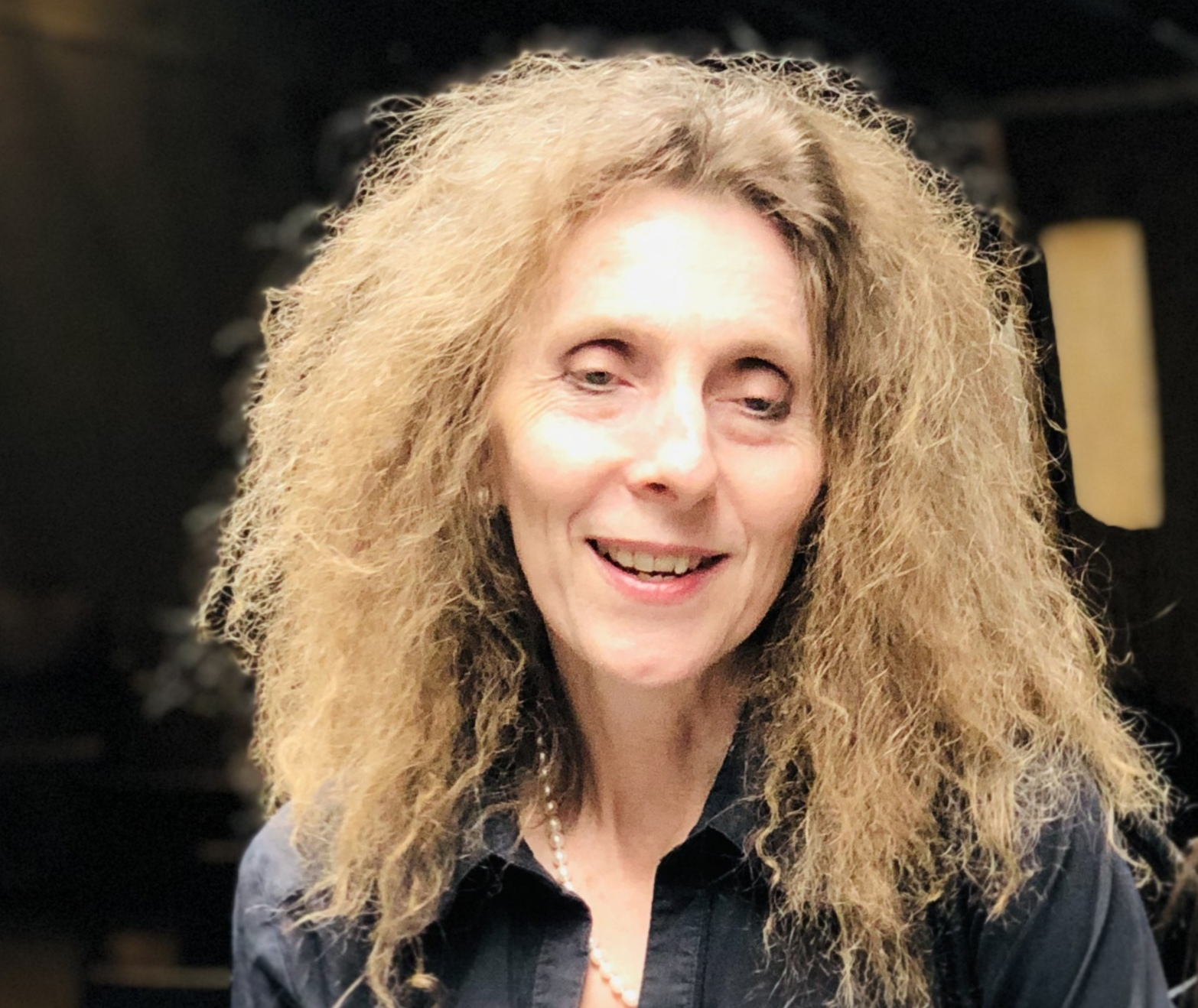
- Born: Australia
- Education: University of Melbourne; King's College London; Birkbeck, University of London
- Occupation: Academic
- Known for: Co-founder of MA degree in Black British Literature; First Female College Orator Goldsmiths, University of London

Deirdre Osborne is an Australian-born academic, who was Professor of Literature and Drama in English. She taught in the Department of English and Creative Writing at Goldsmiths, University of London and was Equality, Diversity and Inclusion Co-ordinator for the School of Arts and Humanities. She co-founded the MA degree in Black British Writing. In 2022, Osborne was elected an Honorary Fellow of the Royal Society of Literature for "her contribution to the advancement of literature in the UK".

== Career ==
Deirdre Osborne studied at the University of Melbourne, Australia, earning a Classics degree, English Literature at King's College London, and did a research PhD in Victorian literature (for which she was Australian Bicentennial Scholar) from Birkbeck, University of London, where she also taught.

She was Professor of Literature and Drama in English in the Department of English and Creative Writing until 2024, after having worked for 16 years in the Department of Theatre and Performance Goldsmiths, University of London.

=== Black British Literature initiatives ===
With Emerita Professor Joan Anim-Addo, Osborne co-founded in 2014 the MA in Black British Writing/Literature, a ground-breaking course taught nowhere else. It received the Student Union Teaching Award for "Compelling and Diverse Curriculum" (2018).

In 2017, Osborne wrote the syllabus and produced materials to facilitate the Edexcel Examination Board's A-level Black British Literature syllabus.

Osborne was responsible for organising two notable international conferences at Goldsmiths: "On Whose Terms?": Critical Negotiations in Black British Literature and the Arts, in 2008, and On Whose Terms? Ten Years On… (2018). She co-convened the spoken-word poetry conference at Royal Central School of Speech and Drama (2022) and supported the International Black Speculative Writing Festival, director Kadija Sesay, at Goldsmiths in 2024.

=== Writing ===
Osborne has published extensively on the work of Black British writers (including Jackie Kay, Bernardine Evaristo, Fred D'Aguiar, Kwame Kwei-Armah, Roy Williams, Lemn Sissay, SuAndi, debbie tucker green, Andrea Levy, Valerie Mason-John and Mojisola Adebayo).

Osborne's books include Critically Black: Black British Dramatists and Theatre in the New Millennium (2016), Inheritors of the Diaspora: Contemporary Black British Poetry, Drama and Prose (2016), Bringing up baby: food, nurture and childrearing in late-Victorian literature (2016) and, as editor, The Cambridge Companion to British Black and Asian Literature, the first comprehensive account of the influence of contemporary British Black and Asian writing in British culture, which "investigates the past sixty-five years of literature by centralising the work of British Black and Asian writers".

In 2021, with Joan Anim-Addo and Kadija Sesay, Osborne wrote This is The Canon: Decolonize Your Bookshelf in 50 Books – in the words of Nikesh Shukla "a vital and timely introduction to some of the best books I've ever read" – which is described as "[s]ubverting the reading lists that have long defined Western cultural life", highlighting alternatives by people of African or Asian descent and indigenous peoples.

She is a member of the Darcus Howe Legacy Collective and co-edited with Leila Hassan and Margaret Peacock the commemorative Special Issue of Race Today, the first edition of the magazine published since 1988.

=== Other literary work ===
Osborne has been a participant in a variety of literature-related events, both as a speaker and interviewing writers, such as in 2023 being "in conversation" with actor, playwright and novelist Paterson Joseph.

She is the Chair of the Royal Society of Literature's International Writers Award panel in 2025 following work as a panellist—with Kit Fan, Moniza Alvi, Kwame Anthony Appiah, Chloe Aridjis, Homi K. Bhabha, Margaret Busby, Maureen Freely and Natalie Teitler—for the RSL International Writers awards in 2024, and was made first female College Orator at Goldsmiths in the same year.

Her literary series BLAK to Black supported by the Royal Society of Literature opens dialogues and connections, to celebrate the cultures and creativities of BLAK and Black writers, to bridge the apparent gaps in awareness and availability of literature by First Nations/BLAK writers in the UK. Events to date include conversations between Leah Purcell and Paterson Joseph, Tony Birch and Dorothea Smartt.

Note- BLAK is used with permission from the late Destiny Deacon, KuKu (Far North Queensland) and Erub/Mer (Torres Strait).

== Recognition and honours ==
Osborne is a Fellow of the Royal Society of Arts, and in 2022 was elected an Honorary Fellow of the Royal Society of Literature (RSL), alongside Sandra Agard, Adjoa Andoh, Suresh Ariaratnam, Nicola Beauman, Julie Blake, Steve Cook, Steve Dearden, Joy Francis, Helen Garnons-Williams, Jane Gregory, Christie Hickman, Nicolette Jones, Julian May, Polly Pattullo and Di Speirs.

== Selected bibliography ==
- 2016. Critically Black: Black British Dramatists and Theatre in the New Millennium. University of Manchester Press.
- 2016. Inheritors of the Diaspora: Contemporary Black British Poetry, Drama and Prose. London: Northcote Press.
- 2016. Bringing up Baby: Food, Nurture and Childrearing in late-Victorian literature.
- 2021. (With Kadija Sesay and Joan Anim-Addo) This is the Canon: Decolonize Your Bookshelves in 50 Books. London: Greenfinch/Quercus. ISBN 978-1529414592.

=== As editor ===
- 2008. Hidden Gems. London: Oberon Books. ISBN 978-1840028430
- 2011. A Raisin in the Sun. London: Methuen Drama. ISBN 978-1408140901
- 2011. A Raisin in the Sun [Critical Edition]. London: Methuen Drama. ISBN 9781408140901
- 2012. Hidden Gems Two: Contemporary Black British Plays: 2. London: Oberon Books. ISBN 978-1849431484
- 2014. (With Mary F. Brewer and Lynette Goddard) Modern and Contemporary Black British Drama. London and New York: Palgrave Macmillan. ISBN 9780230303195
- 2016. Contemporary Black British Women's Writing: Contradictions and Heritages.
- 2016. The Cambridge Companion to British Black and Asian Literature (1945–2010). Cambridge and New York: Cambridge University Press. ISBN 9781107139244. ISBN 9781316504802
