= Pamela Mabini =

South African human rights activist (1978–2025)

- Born: 21 March 1979; Gqeberha, Eastern Cape, South Africa
- Died: 7 March 2025 (aged 46); Gqeberha, Eastern Cape, South Africa
- Cause of death: Gunshot wounds
- Occupations: Human rights activist Whistleblower
- Organization: Maro Foundation
- Known for: Sharing information that led to the arrest of Tim Omotoso

Pamela Phumla Mabini (21 March 1978 –7 March 2025) was a South African human rights activist and whistleblower. A prominent advocate for women's rights in her hometown of Gqeberha, Mabini became more widely known for raising concerns about Nigerian televangelist Tim Omotoso, which led to him being charged with multiple offences including human trafficking and sexual assault. In 2025, during the culmination of Omotoso's trial, Mabini was shot dead outside her home by unknown assailants.

== Activism ==
=== Community activism ===
Mabini was the founder and director of the Maro Foundation, a nonprofit organisation that worked to reduce violent crimes in Gqeberha. Mabini was a known advocate for female victims of crimes, including appearing in court with them. She also provided items to disadvantaged communities in Nelson Mandela Bay, including food, clothing, school uniform, and sanitary towels. Mabini received press attention after she publicly called on the then-Minister of Police, Bheki Cele, to walk around the townships of Nelson Mandela Bay without his bodyguards in response to rising violent crimes and robberies in the area. In 2023, she was named a Local Hero by the Daily Dispatch, a newspaper based in Eastern Cape.

=== Whistleblowing ===
Between 2015 and 2017, the Commission for the Promotion and Protection of the Rights of Cultural, Religious and Linguistic Communities (CPL) actively investigated allegations of malpractice among places of worship in South Africa. Mabini approached the CPL with information gathered from her victim advocacy role about sexual abuse and human trafficking occurring at a church owned by Tim Omotoso, a Nigerian televangelist based in South Africa. The information provided by Mabini led to Omotoso's arrest in 2017; he was subsequently charged with 63 offences, including racketeering, human trafficking, rape and sexual assault. His trial started in 2018, and Mabini was a frequent attendee, and also provided support to the witnesses testifying against him.

== Death and response ==
Mabini began receiving regular death threats, including one attempt on her life in which she was physically assaulted, following the start of Omotoso's trial at the Gqeberha High Court in 2018. The CPL at the time released a statement criticising what it saw as the South African government's "inefficient" witness protection programme, which it also noted did not extend to whisteblowers who were not themselves witnesses to the crime.

On 7 March 2025, shortly after closing arguments at Omotoso's trial, Mabini was found shot dead in her car, parked outside her home on Tshauka Street, KwaZakele, Gqeberha, by her mother. She was 46 years old. On 11 March, a 44-year-old man was killed at a taxi rink in Njoli; the police subsequently reported that he had been a person of interest in the investigation into Mabini's killing. As of December 2025, no one had been arrested in relation to her death.

Human Rights Watch issued a statement raising concerns about the safety of whistleblowers in South Africa following Mabini's murder. The South African Human Rights Commission expressed "shock" at her murder and criticised authorities for failing to protect her. The Human Rights Research Centre called on the South African government to adopt the Whistleblowers Protection Bill.

The African National Congress caucus condemned Mabini's killing. The president of South Africa, Cyril Ramaphosa, expressed his condolences to her family. The minister of justice, Mmamoloko Kubayi, also condemned her murder.

Omotoso was subsequently acquitted of all charges and returned to Nigeria. The judgement criticised the prosecution for bungling the case.

== Recognition ==
In December 2025, Mabini was named on of that year's laureates for the Blueprint Whistleblower Prize.
