= Kadija Sesay =

British literary activist and writer (born 1962)

Kadija Sesay MBE, Hon. FRSL
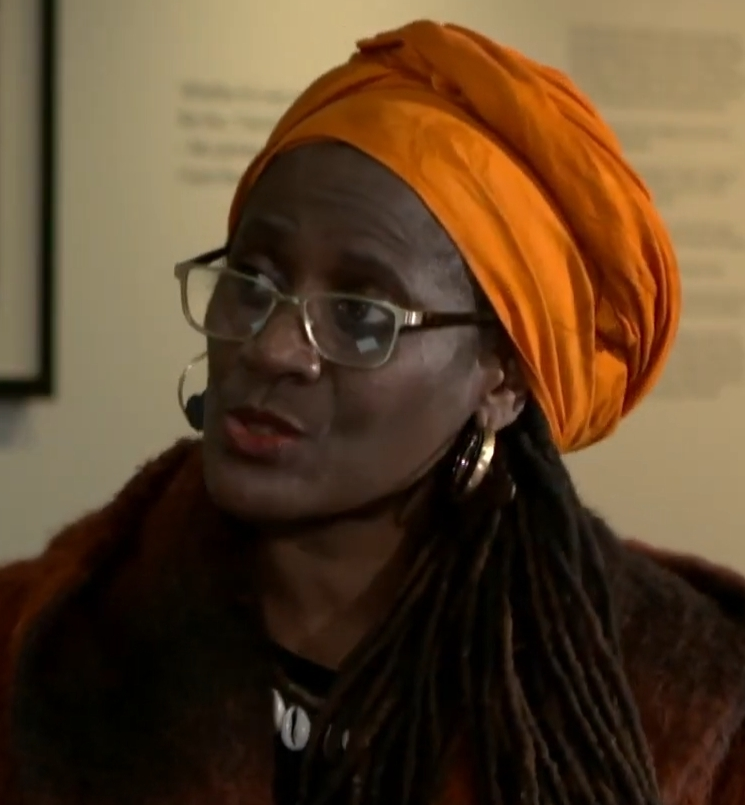
- In 2017
- Born: 1962 (age 63–64); London, United Kingdom
- Other name: Kadija George
- Education: Birmingham University
- Occupations: Literary activist, writer, editor
- Website: www.sablelitmag.org

Kadija George MBE, Hon. FRSL (born 1962), also known as Kadija Sesay, is a British literary activist, short story writer and poet of Sierra Leonean descent, and the publisher and managing editor of the magazine SABLE LitMag. Her work has earned her many awards and nominations, including the Cosmopolitan Woman of Achievement in 1994, Candace Woman of Achievement in 1996, The Voice Community Award in Literature in 1999 and the Millennium Woman of the Year in 2000. She is the General Secretary for African Writers Abroad (PEN International) and organises the Writers' HotSpot – trips for writers abroad, where she teaches creative writing and journalism courses.

== Biography ==
Born in London of Sierra Leonean heritage, Sesay is a graduate of Birmingham University, in England, where she majored in West African studies. She then became a freelance journalist, and from the mid-1990s until 1998 she worked as a black literature development co-ordinator for the Centerprise Literature Development Project, where she set up the newspaper Calabash. In 2001, she founded Sable LitMag.

Sesay has edited or co-edited several books, including Burning Words, Flaming Images: Poems and Short Stories by Writers of African Descent (1996), IC3: The Penguin Book of New Black Writing in Britain (with Courttia Newland, 2000), Dance the Guns to Silence: 100 Poems for Ken Saro-Wiwa (Flipped Eye Publishing, 2005), and (as Kadija George) Six Plays by Black and Asian Women Writers (Aurora Metro Books, 2005), Write Black, Write British: From Post Colonial to Black British Literature (Hansib Publications, 2005).

In 2007, she created the first SABLE Literary Festival in The Gambia, where she now programmes the Mboka literary festival and bookfair, which she co-founded in 2016.

She is co-director of Peepal Tree Press's writer development programme, Inscribe, alongside fellow poet Dorothea Smartt.

Sesay's first full collection of poems, entitled Irki, was published in 2013. Her poetry, short stories and essays have appeared in a range of publications, including the 2019 anthology New Daughters of Africa, edited by Margaret Busby.

Sesay was appointed Member of the Order of the British Empire (MBE) in the 2020 Birthday Honours for services to publishing. In 2021, she was elected an honorary Fellow of the Royal Society of Literature.

In 2021, with Joan Anim-Addo and Deirdre Osborne she curated This is The Canon: Decolonize Your Bookshelf in 50 Books – in the words of Nikesh Shukla "a vital and timely introduction to some of the best books I've ever read" – which is described as "[s]ubverting the reading lists that have long defined Western cultural life", highlighting alternatives by people of African or Asian descent and indigenous peoples.

She co-edited (with Cheryl Robson) the 2024 anthology Encounters with James Baldwin: Celebrating 100 Years.

Her PhD thesis on "Black Publishers and Pan-Africanism" is scheduled for publication by Africa World Press.

She is founder of the International Black Speculative Writing Festival.

== Selected bibliography ==
=== As editor ===
- Burning Words, Flaming Images: Poems and Short Stories by Writers of African Descent (S.A.K.S. Publications, 1996)
- IC3: The Penguin Book of New Black Writing in Britain (with Courttia Newland; London: Hamish Hamilton, 2000). 20th-Anniversary Edition (with a new introduction by Kadija Sesay and Courttia Newland), Penguin Books, 2021, ISBN 9780241993880.
- Dance the Guns to Silence: 100 Poems for Ken Saro-Wiwa (Flipped Eye Publishing, 2005)
- Six Plays by Black and Asian Women Writers (as Kadija George; Aurora Metro Books, 2005)
- Write Black, Write British: From Post Colonial to Black British Literature (Hansib Publications, 2005)
- Black British Perspectives: A Series of Conversations on Black Art Forms (Foreword by Wesley Zepherin; SAKS Publications, 2011). Other contributors: Raimi Gbadamosi, Paul Goodwin, Sonia Dyer, Kevin Le Gendre, Sheila Chandra, Kwame Kwaten, Carol Tulloch, Avis Charles, Susan Stockwell, Michael McMillan, Jonzi D, Femi Elufowoju Jr, Nii Ayikwei Parkes, Margaret Busby and Diran Adebayo.
- (With Joan Anim-Addo and Deirdre Osborne) This is the Canon: Decolonize Your Bookshelves in 50 Books (London: Greenfinch/Quercus, 2021; ISBN 978-1529414592.
- (With Cheryl Robson) Encounters with James Baldwin: Celebrating 100 Years (Aurora Metro, 2024; ISBN 9781913641412).

=== Poetry ===
- Irki, Peepal Tree Press, 2013, ISBN 978-1845232085
- Hairvolution: Her Hair, Her Story, Our History, Supernova Books, 2021, ISBN 978-1-913641-13-9
