= National Black Arts Alliance =

British organization for the development of Black cultural expression

The National Black Arts Alliance (NBAA), originally known as the Black Arts Alliance (BAA) when it was established in 1985, is a British national members' network committed to the development of arts and artists from Black cultural communities through advocacy, training and events. The Alliance was formed by a group of community artists attending the Sheldon Trust, "who considered that Black art was being marginalised in the UK by funders, art audiences, and politicians alike", and it became the UK's largest network of Black artists, working across all artforms with a wide range of both national and international artists (including Ntozake Shange, August Wilson and James Early).

A registered charity run by Black artists, NBAA is managed by a board of trustees and a development group of active members, with membership is open to Black artists, cultural activists and those who facilitate and enable their work.

Since the mid-1980s, poet and arts curator SuAndi has also been the organization's freelance Cultural Director. In 2015, she gave a paper to arts practitioners, funders, and policymakers that was described by campaigning group Platform as arresting, in which she spoke on "justice in arts funding" in the context of the NBAA's experience and the history of Black cultural contributions ("using Black in the correct political sense of cultural unity"), saying: "We have never wanted a separate sector but to be acknowledged as mature enough to handle our own budgets, to sit at the head table, not merely serve the after-dinner coffee. We are not refugees, there is no country called Refugee-land. Even at our very lowest those of us who have survived wars and famine we are still cultural ambassadors extending our arms to share with you. This landscape so green, this homeland which has benefited from its colonial past of conquer and plunder has never looked back and thought maybe it is over-time for recompense. Our cultural influences are visible ... in architecture, language, indeed at every level of arts, culture and society."

== Library ==
The NBAA has donated its library, comprising "a broad and unique collection of arts, culture and literature", to the Ahmed Iqbal Ullah Race Relations Resource Centre at the University of Manchester.
