= Imoinda =

2008 opera

IMOINDA or She Who Will Lose Her Name is a 2008 opera and the first libretto to be written by an African-Caribbean woman, Professor Joan Anim-Addo. It is a re-writing of Aphra Behn's Oroonoko, first published in 1688.

== Synopsis ==
The play features Oroonoko's lover Imoinda, a young African princess who is doubly enslaved, once by her king into marriage and then sold into the trans-Atlantic slave trade. The work focuses on her experience with the slave masters and the birth of a child who symbolizes the triumphant survival of African-heritage people forcibly transplanted in the Caribbean diaspora. Imoinda is ultimately reunited with Oroonoko.

== Publication ==
The libretto was first published in Italian (translated by Dr Giovanna Covi and Chiara Pedrotti) by the University of Trento and then later re-published in English by Mango Publishing as demand for it grew.

== Productions ==
It has been performed in New York City, United States. In May 2008, the State University of New York at Geneseo and the Rochester School of the Arts put on a performance with funding from the New York State Music Fund.

In 2019 the work was performed by Goldsmiths at the University of London.
