= Tim Omotoso =

Nigerian televangelist (born 1958)

- Born: Timothy Oluseun Omotoso; July 14, 1958 (age 67); Nigeria
- Occupation: Pastor
- Years active: 1985–2018
- Criminal charges: 32 charges of rape, human trafficking and racketeering

Tim Omotoso (born Timothy Oluseun Omotoso, 14 July 1958) is a Nigerian televangelist and the senior pastor of Jesus Dominion International (JDI), based in Durban, South Africa. He was arrested by the South African priority crimes unit, Hawks, on 20 April 2017 at the Port Elizabeth International Airport. On 2 April 2025, he was found not guilty and acquitted on all 32 charges. After spending about 8 years behind bars on trial, Omotoso was set free because the court found that the prosecuting team failed to present a solid case beyond reasonable doubt.

== Career ==
The global outreach arm of his ministry functions under Tim Omotoso Global Outreach (TOGO). It is an Apostolic and Prophetic ministry designed under Trinitarian auspices to propagate the gospel of Jesus Christ to this generation with signs following. The Church arm is Jesus Dominion International with branches across South Africa, it holds crusades all over the world. His mandate is to turn the hearts of men back to God. This vision is carried out through the Church arm- Jesus Dominion International, Help the Helpless project which reaches out to the less privileged and needy in society, and a youth empowerment Project (YEP) which is set to empower youth and mentor them.

Omotoso initiated a youth project in South Africa called “Youth Empowerment Project” (YEP), under which he has mentored a number of music groups including Grace Galaxy and Simply Chrysolite and also individual artists such as Shoggy Tosh who have composed their own songs and produced albums under his guidance.

In one of the awards they were in the same category with Kelly Rowlands for best international act BEFFTA awards and they won the award.

== Television ==
Omotoso is the founder of a 24-hour satellite TV station, Ancient of Days Broadcasting Network (ADBN), which airs across the Caribbean, Africa, Mexico, Middle East, Europe and United States. His weekly TV broadcast, 'Just As I Am', features music, sermons and miracle sessions and airs across various networks.

== Publications ==
He has written a book titled How to Enjoy Health, Wealth and Longevity and also a prayer book - Prayer Bonanza. His ministry also publishes an annual daily devotional. His messages are also available on DVD.

== Personal life ==
He has said he was taught by the Lord to play the piano, the guitar, drums and other musical instruments before the age of 10. In the 1980s, he served as a music director for Ebenezer Obey's Decross Band & Inter Reformers' Band in the 80s.

=== Child sex abuse allegations ===
Omotoso is alleged to have groomed people and abused them from the age of 14. He was arrested by the South African priority crimes unit, Hawks, on 20 April 2017 at the Port Elizabeth International Airport after a whistleblower, Pamela Mabini, shared information about his alleged crimes with the Commission for the Promotion and Protection of the Rights of Cultural, Religious and Linguistic Communities.

Alongside co-accused Lusanda Sulani and Zukiswa Sitho, South African women alleged to be his assistants, Omotoso faced charges of rape, human trafficking, sexual assault, and racketeering. Initially charged with 97 counts, this was reduced to 63, then 32 and then everything was cleared.

The prosecution alleged Omotoso exploited his authority within JDI to groom and abuse young women, some as young as 14. Complainants claimed they were recruited under promises of spiritual or material benefits, only to be subjected to strict control at Omotoso's properties, such as in Durban, where he allegedly assaulted them. Cheryl Zondi, a key witness, testified in 2018 that Omotoso raped her starting at age 14, a testimony that gained widespread attention as the trial was broadcast live, a first for a major rape case in South Africa.

The trial faced significant delays due to defense motions for mistrials, judicial recusals (e.g., Judge Mandela Makaula recused himself in 2019 over a conflict of interest), and prosecution changes. Defense attorney Peter Daubermann challenged witness credibility and accused former prosecutor Nceba Ntelwa of misconduct, including encouraging perjury—allegations Judge Irma Schoeman later deemed exaggerated but noted as irregular.

On 7 March 2025, Mabini, who had reported Omotoso to authorities and offered support to his victims, was shot dead outside her home in KwaZakele.

==== Acquittal ====
On April 2, 2025, Judge Schoeman acquitted Omotoso, Sulani, and Sitho of all charges in the Eastern Cape High Court in Gqeberha. She ruled that the prosecution failed to prove guilt beyond reasonable doubt, citing inadequate cross-examination and prosecutorial mishandling, though she acknowledged weaknesses in the defense's narrative. The ruling elicited mixed reactions: supporters celebrated, while victims’ advocates, including Zondi, expressed dismay, underscoring broader concerns about addressing sexual violence in South Africa.

== Immigration Case ==
In May 2025, Timothy Omotoso was arrested by the South African police in an immigration case.
