= The Girl with Brains in Her Feet =

1997 film

- Directed by: Roberto Bangura
- Written by: Jo Hodges
- Produced by: Henry Herbert; Don Boyd
- Starring: Amanda Mealing
- Distributed by: Alliance Releasing
- Release dates: 6 September 1997 (TIFF); 12 June 1998 (UK)
- Running time: 98 minutes
- Country: United Kingdom
- Language: English
- Box office: £18,232

The Girl with Brains in Her Feet is a 1997 British comedy film directed by Roberto Bangura. It was screened in the Contemporary World Cinema section of the 1997 Toronto International Film Festival.

== Cast ==
- Amanda Mealing as Vivienne Jones
- Joanna Ward as Jacqueline 'Jack' Jones
- Jamie McIntosh as Poor Bastard
- Jodie Smith as Maxine
- Richard Claxton as Steve Green
- John Thomson as Mr. Loughborough
