= William Ansah Sessarakoo =

Former slave and later public figure (1730s – c. 1770)

William Sessarakoo
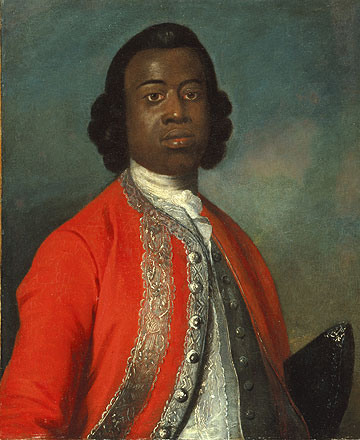
- Sessarakoo in 1749
- Born: c. 1735; Anomabu, Dutch Gold Coast, Dutch Republic
- Died: c. 1770 (aged c. 35)
- Occupations: Public figure, slave trader
- Known for: Traveling to England as the "Royal African"
- Parent: Eno Kurentsi

William Ansah Sessarakoo (c. 1735 – c. 1770) was a Fante trader and public figure, best known for his enslavement in the West Indies, subsequent rescue, and high-profile stay in England. He was both prominent among the Fante people and influential among Europeans concerned with the transatlantic slave trade.

His father, John Corrente, had previously sent Ansah's brother to France, and around 1744 he arranged to have Ansah travel to England to gain an education, curry favor with the British, and serve as his eyes and ears in Europe. The ship captain entrusted with Ansah's transport, however, sold him into slavery along with the rest of the human cargo in Barbados before going on to England. Ansah remained enslaved there for several years, until a free Fante trader happened to recognize him and quickly alerted Corrente of his son's fate.

Corrente petitioned the British Royal African Company for aid, who sent an agent to emancipate Ansah and complete his transport to England, finally arriving in the summer of 1748. Upon his delayed arrival, Ansah was received as a prince and quickly became a fascination of London's high society. (Note: While Ansah was universally referred to as an "African Prince" or "Royal African" in British sources, this is a misapprehension. Fante succession was very complex, and substantially matrilineal, and Ansah was never set to inherit his father's military, administrative, or economic influence.) Most notably, he attended a live performance of Oroonoko, and, much to the audience's surprise, fled the theater in tears. The play depicted a wrongly enslaved African prince who likely reminded Ansah much of himself.

Upon returning to Anomabu in 1750, Ansah took up work as a writer at Cape Coast Castle, the primary British fortification on the Gold Coast. After leaving Cape Coast on bad terms, Ansah worked as a slave trader. The details of his death are unknown.

== Early life ==
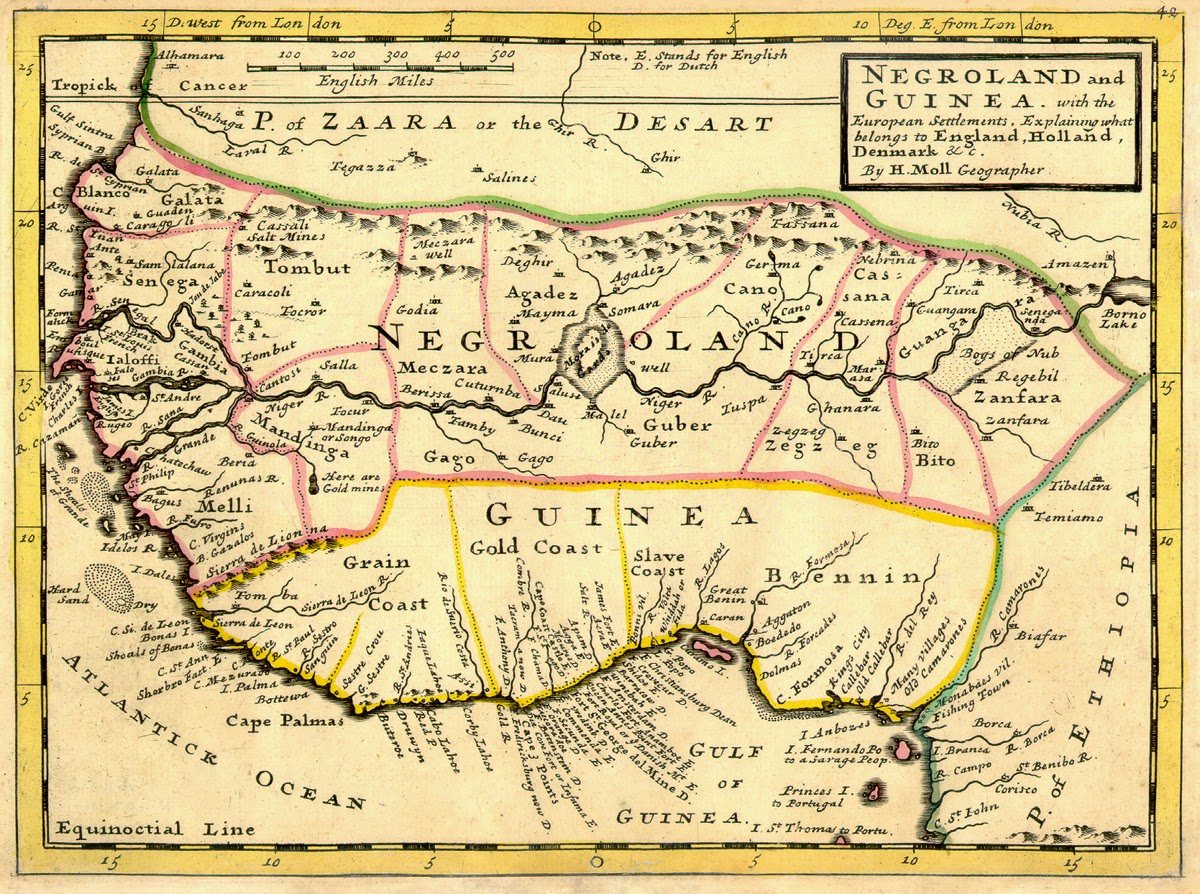
1736 map of West Africa. Annamaboe is identified as an English-aligned port.

Ansah was born in Annamaboe (modern-day Anomabu, Ghana), sometime in the 1730s, to Eno Baisie Kurentsi (rendered "John Corrente" by Europeans). Annamaboe was at that time the largest slave-trading port on the Gold Coast and the preeminent member of the Fante Confederacy. Corrente was described by European traders as "absolute master at Annamaboe", holding the greatest authority in matters of politics, commerce, diplomacy, and military in the town and surrounding region. Most importantly to Westerners, Corrente was the chief caboceer—those responsible for supplying African slaves to European traders—and therefore Ansah and his family were of interest to the many European polities competing for access to abundant trade from Annamaboe.

By the time of Ansah's birth, the primary competitors were France and England. The British had constructed a fort at Annamaboe in 1674, but it was abandoned and destroyed by 1731, as the Royal African Company was in a declining economic state. With the French aiming to gain a foothold on the Gold Coast, Corrente seized every opportunity to play them and the British against each other, accepting lavish gifts from both. One such concession from the French was the opportunity to have one of his sons (Ansah's half-brother, named Bassi) be educated and feted in Paris. Bassi returned to Annamaboe with a European education and extensive knowledge of France, having even been introduced to the King. Corrente's strengthening relationship with France, however, worried the English traders in Annamaboe. In turn, the Royal African Company offered to host another of Corrente's sons in London. Corrente eagerly agreed to send Ansah.

== Enslavement and rescue ==
Some time between 1741 and 1746, Ansah was taken aboard a ship under the command of Captain Hamilton, which was to convey him to London after offloading its cargo of slaves in the West Indies along the way. (Note: The closest match available in the Slave Voyages database is the Valentine (Voyage ID# 94787), captained by Thomas Hamilton, which reached the West Indies in March 1743.) Hamilton, however, betrayed Ansah's trust and sold him also into slavery in Bridgetown, Barbados. John Corrente and the Fante people, having lost contact with Ansah, could only presume him dead.

The exact nature or extent of Ansah's servitude on Barbados are not known. The purported Memoirs of the Young Prince, written in 1750 by an anonymous Englishman, states only that "he fell into the Hands of a Gentleman of distinguished Character, where he was treated with much Humanity". This "gentleman" was probably Jonathan Blenman, the Attorney General of Barbados, whose name was recorded on Ansah's bill of sale.

Fortunately, Ansah was well known by the Fante people, and he was eventually discovered by a Fante trader who was doing business in Barbados. Once the news of Ansah's enslavement reached Annamaboe, Corrente insisted that Ansah be freed and conveyed the rest of the way to England. British officials agreed, concluding that securing his son's freedom "will be a means to conciliate Corrantee to, and rivet him in the Interest of the British Nation in opposition to the French".

English trade had, during Ansah's enslavement, been suffering in Annamaboe as Corrente blamed the nation for his son's presumed death. It was not surprising that the English were quick to jump on the opportunity to return to Corrente's good graces. An agent of the Royal African Company, David Crichton, set out from Annamaboe, bringing along the son of another caboceer, a boy called Frederick, who would be accompanying Ansah to England upon his release. He arrived in Barbados in October 1747, located Ansah, and secured his legal freedom in February 1748, purchased at a cost of £120. Perhaps as a compensatory gesture after Ansah's betrayal at the hands of a fellow Englishman, Crichton spent lavishly on commissioning fine clothing for Ansah and Frederick, as well as their food, lodging, and spending money while in Bridgetown.

== Time in England ==
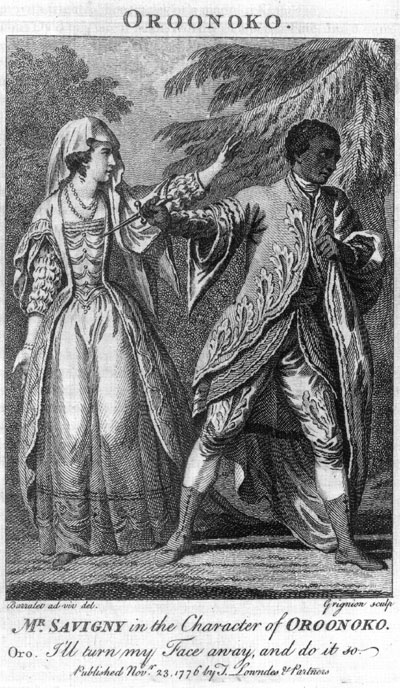
Illustration of a 1776 performance of Thomas Southerne's Oroonoko

After finally escaping Barbados, Ansah arrived in England in 1748 with fanfare, received as "The Prince of Annamaboe" or "The Royal African". Placed under the personal protection of George Montagu-Dunk, the president of the Board of Trade, Ansah "received privileged treatment in Britain [...] for political and economic reasons." He and his companion Frederick quickly became minor celebrities, with many reports detailing their "frequent appearances in London society". They were baptized, given religious instruction, and even introduced to King George II on January 22, 1749. More fine clothing was purchased for them at Crichton's expense, and Ansah had his portrait painted by Gabriel Mathias in a characteristically English red coat. (Note: David Crichton made these purchases as an agent of the Royal African Company, but was never able to collect reimbursement, as the Company was in dire financial straits before being entirely dissolved by the African Company Act 1750 the next year.)

In the most widely reported incident of Ansah's time in England, he and Frederick attended a showing of Oroonoko, a play depicting the wrongful enslavement of an African prince and his wife by a duplicitous European slave trader. The African prince, Oronooko, and his wife, Imoinda, are sold into slavery and transported to the West Indies where they are forced to work long hours alongside lowly slaves. When Imoinda becomes pregnant, Oroonoko stages a slave rebellion. The rebellion ends poorly, however, and Oroonoko is forced to kill Imoinda and is himself publicly executed. Given his kidnapping, Ansah likely related to Oroonoko on a very basic level. Ansah was overcome and left the theater before the final act, while Frederick remained but visibly wept through the remainder of the performance, attracting much sympathy.

Ansah's visit to England was never meant to be permanent, and he thus departed for home and a return to the Fante people in December 1750. He arrived, in April 1751, "elaborately dressed in the latest style befitting his station" with an English education and immense understanding of English culture. A white trader who traveled on the same ship complimented the newly-cosmopolitan prince as "master of a great deal of solid sense and a politeness of behavior I seldom meet with in any of our own complexion".

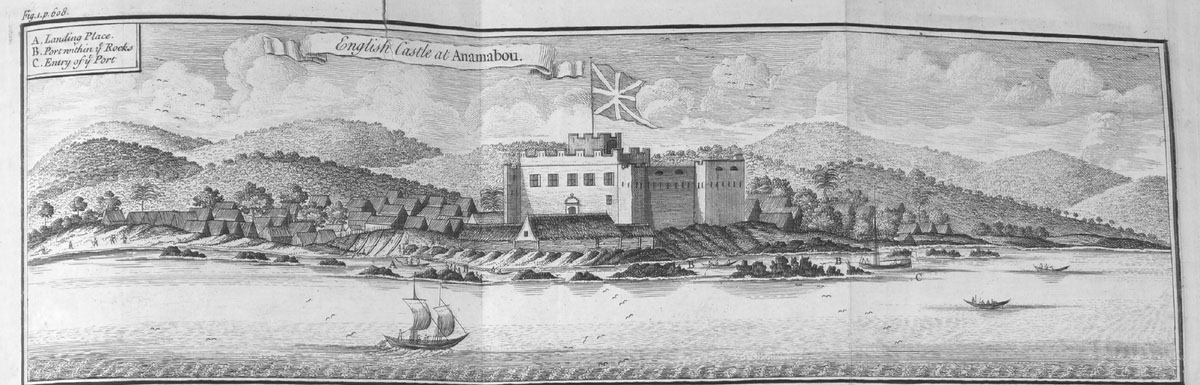
Sketch of Fort William in Annamaboe

The Royal African Company hoped that their ostentatiously generous treatment of Ansah in England, despite the unfortunate Barbadian detour, had accomplished its primary goal of endearing the English above the French to Ansah and his father, John Corrente. In March 1749, a French ship had docked at Annamaboe intending to open trade, and refused to be deterred by RAC agents. The agents were thus instructed to "repeat to [Corrente] the great Generositys to his Son in England", which successfully induced him to turn away the Frenchmen empty-handed.

After Ansah's return, Corrente wrote to the Board of Admiralty expressing gratitude for the treatment of his son and promising "the assistance of 20,000 men to build a fort on the coast of Africa, in case of threats from the French". Despite this professed allegiance, Corrente continued to actively negotiate with the French, making overtures towards that nation establishing a fort themselves. This may have been a deliberate move to apply pressure and hasten a decision from either side, as in 1752 the Board of Trade ordered the construction of what would become Fort William at Annamaboe.

== Later life in Annamaboe ==
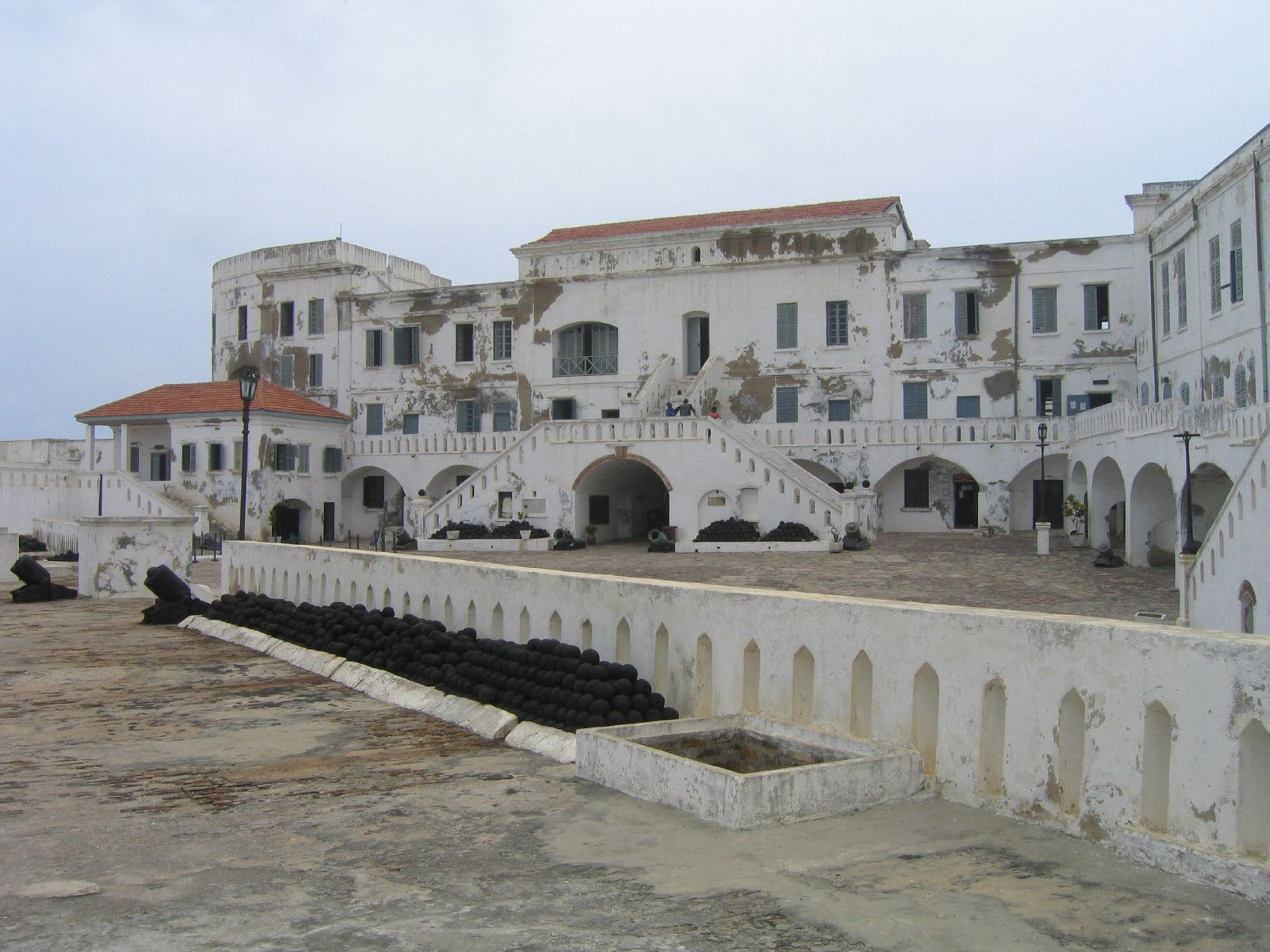
Cape Coast Castle in Ghana

Ansah was literally stripped of the excesses of England almost immediately upon returning home, made by his father to doff his rich scarlet coat and assume instead the minimal, subdued dress that was characteristic of the Fante caboceers. He quickly began working, both as a trader and a key negotiator with British officials, acting as a scribe at Cape Coast Castle, the seat of British power on the Gold Coast some ten miles southwest of Annamaboe.

Employing both his position at Cape Coast Castle and powerful connections in London, Ansah worked with his father, John Corrente, to play the British and French off each other in Annamaboe. By avoiding committing entirely to either, Annamaboe forced both powers to offer competitive trade offers and regular tributes to remain in good standing. In one case, Ansah is known to have personally accepted lavish gifts of brandy from the British that were meant for the greater Fante people.

In 1761, Ansah discovered that he had been paid in watered-down brandy, as other Africans were, rather than the full-strength liquor that was apportioned to white traders. Upset that he was not accorded the privileges of an honorary Englishman, he became infuriated with William Mutter, governor of Cape Coast Castle, and the argument developed into a physical altercation, with Mutter wielding a cane and chasing Ansah bodily from the fort. Mutter went on to claim Ansah was "not a person of Consequence in this Country" and ceased dealings with him. Indeed, while Ansah was John Corrente's son, he was not Corrente's heir.

No longer in good favor with the British, Ansah spent the rest of his life in Annamaboe. Records exist of him acting as a slave trader during this time, but his activities are relatively unknown. He lived his final days and died in relative anonymity, at least in European sources.

== Cultural impact ==
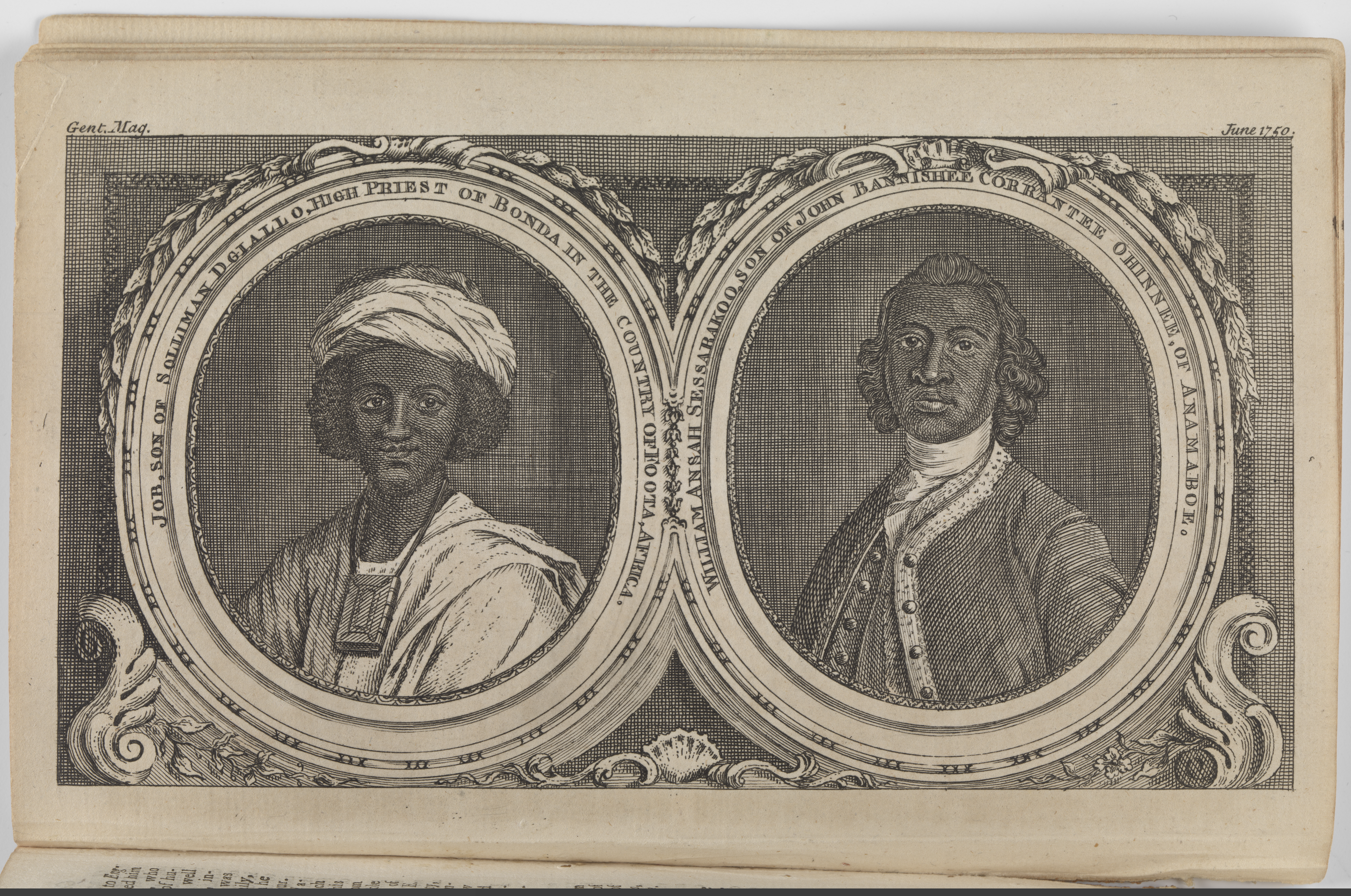
Combined image of "Black Princes" Ayuba Diallo and William Ansah

Ansah's journey to London itself was not unique for the time, being just one of "several African princes [...] educated in England", but his dramatic betrayal into enslavement and subsequent redemption along the way attracted much attention and sympathy among the British upper classes. He was compared to Ayuba Suleiman Diallo, another prominent African trader who had been freed from slavery in Maryland by the Royal African Company about 15 years prior. In both cases, concerns for the plight of individual African aristocrats should not be generalized to indicate broader abolitionist sentiment. These princes were set apart from others of their race, due to their "exceptional social and personal nobility", as well as the critical economic importance they had to England as sellers of less "noble" Africans as chattel.

Ansah's story inspired two popular poems by William Dodd, styled as letters exchanged between "the African prince" and his (invented) lover Zara, left behind in Annamaboe. This version of Ansah bemoans his princely obligation to his duties which demanded their separation, and keenly conveys the degradation of his betrayal, when "the shouted prince is now a slave unknown". He is forced to mingle with "a wretched crew" of other slaves below his station, "of manners brutish, merciless and rude". In her reply, Zara is incredulous that his betrayers would dare to bind "a prince, whom no indignities could hide", but is gratified that he now finds himself freed and "in Britain's happy courts to shine".

A purportedly nonfiction work was also anonymously published as The Royal African: or, Memoirs of the Young Prince of Annamaboe in 1750, though it was "as much a piece of pro-RAC polemic as a biographical account". It made the case that separate traders (those operating outside the aegis of the Royal African Company) exhibited a "mercenary lack of regard for traditional social hierarchy" which had led to Ansah's enslavement and the subsequent endangerment of British primacy at Annamaboe. This was in contrast with the RAC, which "carried on a most glorious and profitable Trade" with "the Wealthiest and the Freest" people of the Gold Coast.

== Bibliography ==
- Brown, Laura (2001). "Spectacles of Cultural Contact: The Fable of the Native Prince". Fables of Modernity. Ithaca, NY: Cornell University Press. ISBN 978-0-8014-3756-4.
- Hanley, Ryan (2015). "The Royal Slave: Nobility, Diplomacy and the "African Prince" in Britain, 1748–1752". Itinerario. 39 (2): 329–347. doi:10.1017/S0165115315000492. hdl:10871/40414. ISSN 0165-1153.
- Sparks, Randy J. (2014). Where the Negroes are Masters. Harvard University Press. pp. 43–65. ISBN 978-0-6747-2487-7.
