= Doirean Wilson =

British academic

- Occupation: Academic
- Employer: Middlesex University London

Doirean Wilson is a British academic who is Diversity Lead at Middlesex University London, and a Senior Lecturer specialising in Strategic HRM, Professional Practitioner and Community Engagement. She has written widely from her expertise on diversity in teaching and learning, and has edited and contributed to many publications.

== Background ==
Her educational qualifications include a doctorate in Professional Practice (D.Prof), a master's degree in Human Resource Management (MA HRM), a postgraduate Certificate in Further Education (PG Cert Ed FE), and a postgraduate Certificate in Management Studies (CMS).

A former journalist, television presenter and projects manager, Wilson has worked as an educator in a variety of roles, and since 1995 has been employed at Middlesex University London. Of Jamaican parentage, she was the first black woman to lead an Executive MBA Programme in a UK university. She is currently Diversity Lead and HR Senior Lecturer at Middlesex University Business School London, specializing in Diversity and Corporate Engagement. She is founder of Inclusivity In Practice, a multi-platform HR information service for diversity practitioners and business leaders.

Among her other involvements, she is chair of the Nubian Jak Community Trust, an advisory board member for the Ghana UK-Based Achievement Awards, and a founding member and advisory board member of the Women's Executive Network.

== Awards and recognition ==
She is a senior fellow for the Higher Education Academy (SFHEA), a fellow of the Royal Society for the Encouragement of Arts, Manufactures and Commerce (FRSA), a fellow of the European Institute for Spirituality in Economics and Society (SPES), and a fellow of the Chartered Institute of Personnel Development (Chartered FCIPD).

== Selected publications ==
=== Edited books ===
- (With R. Prouska & S. Roberts) Consulting in Organisations, Pearson, 2008.
- Developing Personal & Professional Competencies, McGraw-Hill, 2008.
- The Effective Development of Personal and Professional Competencies (HRM2016) and Managing Personal Effectiveness (HRM2014), SAGE Publications, 2010.
- (With L. Peach-Martins) Effective Management of Organization Consulting, SAGE Publications, 2010.
- Personal Effectiveness and Professional Competencies, McGraw-Hill, 2012.
- Professional Consultancy: Practice and Theory MBS3012, McGraw-Hill/Middlesex University, 2012. ISBN 978-0077148973.

=== Selected research papers and professional articles ===
- (With J. Liu) "The Unchanging Perception of Women as Managers", Women in Management Review, Vol. 16, No. 4, 2001, MCB University Press.
- (With J. Liu) "New Job, New Millennium, Same Deal for Women Managers", Women in Management Review, Vol. 20, No. 4, 2001, MCB University Press.
- (With H. Woo and J. Liu) "Gender Impact on Chinese Negotiation: Some Key Issues for Western Negotiators", Women in Management Review, Vol. 16, Nos 7 & 8, 2001.
- (With J. Liu): "Developing Women in a Digital World", Women in Management Review, MCB University Press, 2002.
- "Exploring the Life of a Female Politician", Women in Management Review, MCB University Press, 2003.
- "'What Price Respect' - Exploring the Notion of Respect in a 21st Century Learning Environment", Journal of College Teaching & Learning, Clute Institute, 2010. ISSN 1544-0389
