= Jo Hodges =

Jo Hodges (1959 – 25 July 2017) was a British scriptwriter, novelist, advertising creative and lecturer at London College of Communication. Hodges wrote the 1997 comedy film The Girl with Brains in Her Feet, the first feature film directed by Robert Bangura.

== Life ==
Jo Hodges was born in 1959 in Leicester.

The Girl with Brains in Her Feet, a 1997 film script which Hodges turned into a 1998 novel, told the coming-of-age story of 'Jack', a mixed-race working-class girl from Leicester with dreams of becoming a professional runner.

Photographed by Robert Taylor for a 2001 book Portraits of Black Achievement, she provided encouragement to young black people feeling scared of attempting writing as a career:

In the beginning I didn't dare write as I thought you had to be extremely clever and fantastically well educated to do it...I eventually had a go and decided that maybe I wasn't so stupid after all. I think a lot of black kids deliberately hold themselves back. There is no need to be embarrassed if you're talented or clever at something. Go ahead and show people what you can do.

Hodges worked in advertising for DMB&B, GGK and Ogilvy & Mather. In 2002 she started lecturing on advertising at the University of the Arts London. In 2007 she joined London College of Communication, going on to become course leader of the BA in Advertising there, and later Creative Practice Director for Communications and Media.

She died from an ongoing illness on 25 July 2017, aged 58.

== Works ==
- The Girl with Brains in Her Feet. London: Virago Press, 1998.
