= Dorothea Smartt =

English-Barbadian poet (born 1963)

Dorothea Smartt FRSL
- Born: 1963 (age 62–63); London, United Kingdom
- Other name: Brit-born Bajan
- Education: South Bank Polytechnic; Hunter College (CUNY)
- Occupation: Poet
- Notable work: Ship Shape (2008)
- Website: dorotheasmartt.wordpress.com

Dorothea Smartt FRSL (born 1963) is an English-born poet of Barbadian descent.

== Biography ==
The daughter of Caribbean immigrants from Barbados, Dorothea Smartt was born in London, England, and grew up there. She earned a BA degree in Social Sciences from South Bank Polytechnic and an MA in anthropology from Hunter College (CUNY).

Smartt was poet in residence at Brixton Market and attached live artist at the Institute of Contemporary Arts. She has lectured on creative arts at Birkbeck College, University of London, and Leeds University. She has been poetry editor for Sable LitMag and guest writer at Florida International University and Oberlin College. Her work has appeared in various literary journals and anthologies, including Bittersweet (Women's Press, 1998), The Fire People (Payback Press, 1998), Mythic Women/Real Women (Faber, 2000), IC3: The Penguin Book of New Black Writing in Britain (edited by Kadija George and Courttia Newland, 2000), A Storm Between Fingers (Flipped Eye, 2007) and New Daughters of Africa (edited by Margaret Busby, Myriad Editions, 2019).

An active feminist, Smartt was also an organising member of the Black Lesbian and Gay Centre and the Brixton Black Women's Group in South London in the 80s and 90s.

Smart's multi-media play, Fallout toured primary schools in and around London. She also created and performed the solo work Medusa, which incorporates poetry and visuals. Her poetry collections include Connecting Medium (2001) and, in 2008, Ship Shape, which is an A-Level English Literature title and has been described as "a revisionist work that transforms a legacy of silencing into an exercise of counter-memory, engaging with and expanding its tradition in Caribbean arts."

In 2019, she was elected a Fellow of the Royal Society of Literature (FRSL).

== Selected works ==
- Fallout, play (2000)
- Connecting Medium, poetry (Peepal Tree Press, 2001)
- Samboo's Grave/Bilal's Grave, poetry (Peepal Tree Press, 2007)
- Ship Shape, poetry (Peepal Tree Press, 2008)
- Reader, I Married Him & Other Queer Goings-On, poetry (Peepal Tree Press, 2014)
