= Jools Walker =

English bicyclist, author and TV presenter

- Occupations: Cyclist; tv presenter
- Writing career
- Genre: Non-fiction

Jools Walker is an English bicyclist, TV presenter and author. Her first book, Back in the Frame, was published by Little, Brown Book Group in May 2019 and she is represented by Bell Lomax Moreton.

== Early life ==
Walker grew up in Canning Town, east London with the first bike she owned being a 'metallic green trike'. Later, she started riding a BMX her older brother restored and taught her to ride. However, she says that the 'disgusting comments' she got riding her bike to school made her cycle less and less, eventually stopping in her late teens.

== Career ==
Walker started her blog Velo-City Girl in 2010 after purchasing 'the bike of my dreams', a Pashley Princess using the Cycle to Work scheme her employer, the University of East London, offered. In 2012 she joined cycle clothing firm Vulpine as the operation's manager and started presenting on ITV4's The Cycle Show, with Walker leading on features including the annual vintage cycling festival, l'Eroica festival as well as appearing on the BBC's Newsnight, on a feature on cycling culture. She was featured in the online edition of La Fuga, the cycling industry periodical, in one of their 'Industry Portrait' features. In 2015 she was highlighted as one of Bike Biz's '100 Women of the Year.

In 2018 she started work with the London Bike Kitchen on a regular Women of Colour cycling meet-up after realising that one of the barriers for her to starting cycling again was not seeing 'anyone I identified with'. She now speaks regularly of the need for more diversity in cycling at all levels and of the barriers that keep prevent Women of Colour from accessing cycling.

== Cycling and health ==
In 2016 Walker suffered a stroke and Back in the Frame describes Walker's life with depression. She described its description of her experiences in an interview with The Guardian, saying:, "I’m not trying to be the poster child for what cycling can do for you, but in my book I try to use the experiences that I’ve had on and off a bike, and turn it all into a positive.” In May 2019 an extract from Back in the Frame was published in The Daily Telegraph.
