= Helen (charles) =

British writer and activist

Helen (charles) is a Black British lesbian feminist writer and activist, who has written on womanism and the concept of whiteness. (charles) writes the shape of her name to recall the history of imposition of "family" names on black slaves.

== Works ==
- Womanism: recognizing "difference": one direction for the Black woman activist. Canterbury: University of Kent, 1990. Women's studies occasional papers, no. 21.
- "Whiteness? The relevance of politically colouring the 'non'", in Hilary Hinds, Ann Phoenix & Sackie Stacey (eds), Working out: New Directions for Women's Studies, Falmer: University of Brighton Press, 1992.
- "A Homogeneous Habit: Heterosexual Display in the English Holiday Camp", in Celia Kitzinger and Sue Wilkinson (eds), Heterosexuality: A Feminism & Psychology Reader, Sage Publications, 1993, pp. 270–272.
- "Queer nigger: theorizing 'white' activism", in J. Bristow and A. R. Wilson (eds), Activating Theory: Lesbian, Gay, Bisexual Politics, London: Lawrence & Wishart, 1993.
- "(Not) compromising: inter-skin colour relations", in L. Pearce and J. Stacey (eds), Romance Revisited, London: Lawrence & Wishart, 1995.
- "'White' skins, straight masks", in Delia Jarrett-Macauley (ed.), Reconstructing Womanhood, Reconstructing Feminism, London: Routledge, 1996.
- "The language of womanism: Re-thinking difference", in Heidi Safia Mirza (ed.), Black British Feminist: A Reader, London: Routledge, 1997.
