= Joy Francis =

English journalist

Joy Francis FRSL
- Born: 1965 (age 59–60)
- Occupation(s): Journalist, editor and communications strategist
- Known for: Founder and executive director of Words of Colour.

Joy Francis Hon. FRSL (born 1965) is an English journalist, editor and communications strategist. She has been editor of Pride Magazine, was the founder of The Creative Collective, and is the founder and executive director of the social enterprise Words of Colour.

== Life ==
Francis started as a journalist in 1992, working for Community Care, where she became deputy features editor. In 1998, she created and was launch editor of Public Sector, a weekly newspaper supplement for African Caribbean and Asian professionals in the public sector. Public Sector was shortlisted for Best Specialist Publication in the 2000 Commission for Racial Equality Race in the Media Awards.

In 2000, she was appointed editor of Pride Magazine, but left the magazine after producing three issues, blaming lack of support. Her organization The Creative Collective arranged internships for ethnic minority media students, launched a quarterly glossy magazine called Mediavibe, and worked with Black Britain Online to develop resources to encourage more racially inclusive television and press content.

In 2016, Francis was appointed project manager of the Jerwood Compton Poetry Fellowships. In June 2020, Words of Colour, in collaboration with University College London, launched Take Flight Hub, a virtual development programme to provide support for emerging black and Asian writers.

Francis was elected an Honorary Fellow of the Royal Society of Literature in 2022.

== Works ==
- "White Culture, Black Mark", British Journalism Review, 2003.
