= SuAndi =

British poet, writer, curator

SuAndi OBE, Hon. FRSL
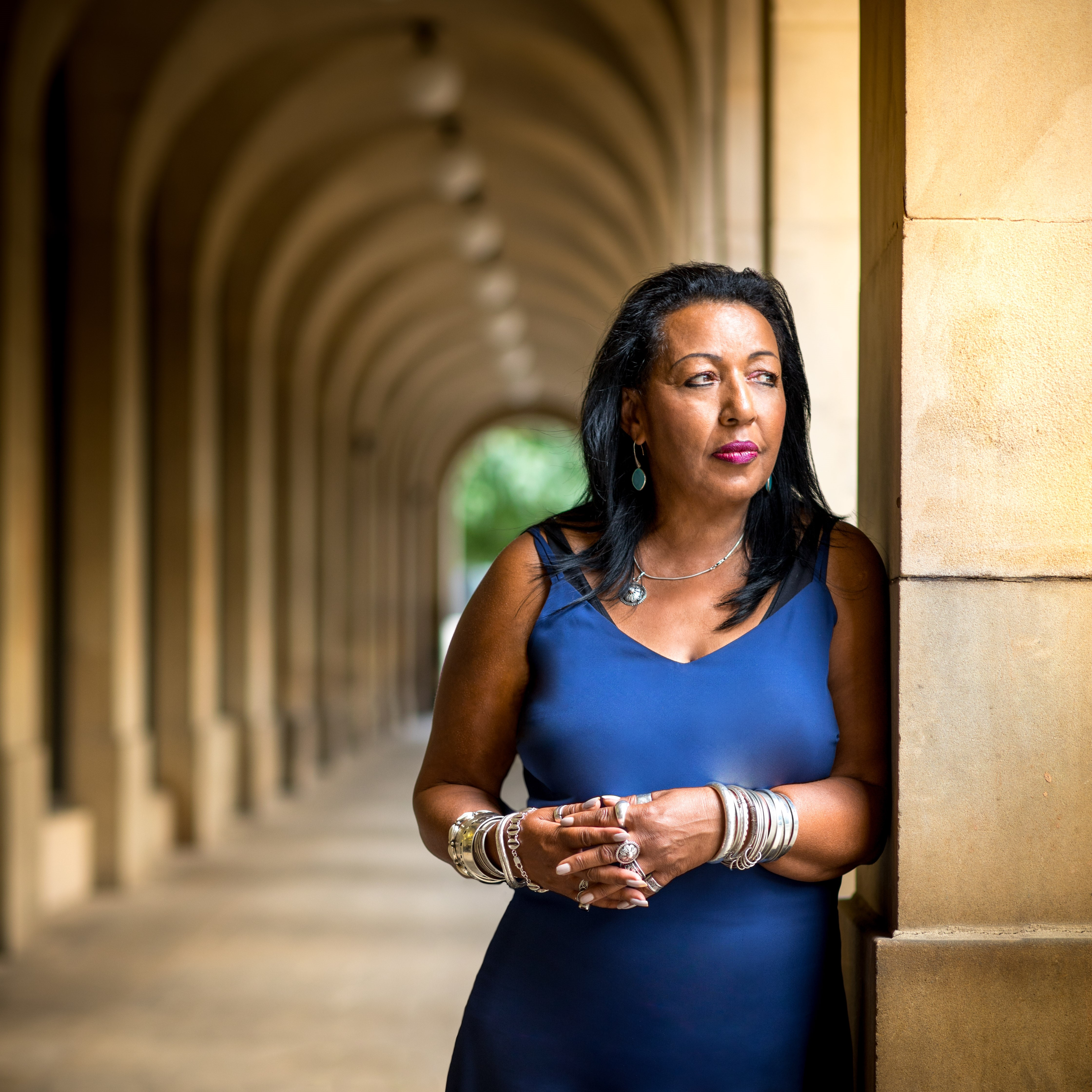
- SuAndi in 2018
- Born: Susan Maria Andi; Hulme, Manchester, England
- Occupations: Performance poet, writer and arts curator

Susan Maria Andi OBE, Hon. FRSL, better known as SuAndi, is a British performance poet, writer and arts curator. Based in North West England, she is particularly acknowledged for raising the profile of black artists in the region as well as nationally. Since 1985, she has been Cultural Director of the National Black Arts Alliance. She was appointed an OBE in 1999 for her contributions to the Black Arts sector. In 2024, she was elected an Honorary Fellow of the Royal Society of Literature (RSL), and was also awarded the Benson Medal, which recognises services to literature across a whole career.

== Life ==
Susan Maria Andi was born as in Hulme, Manchester, North-West England, to a British mother from Liverpool with Irish Catholic roots and a Nigerian seaman father; her self-styled name SuAndi "conjoins her personal and paternal names, and registers the convergence of different histories and ethnicities in her family".

Her career in the arts from the 1980s onwards encompasses participating in Identity Writers Workshop and being a co-founder of BlackScribe, the North West's first Black women's writing collective. She was active as a dancer and model before starting to perform her poetry in 1985. Since 1985, she has also been the freelance Cultural Director of the National Black Arts Alliance, the UK's largest network of Black artists. As the Black Women Writers Development worker at Commonword (where she shared an office with Lemn Sissay), she co-edited Commonword's first anthology of Black poetry, Black and Priceless and was a contributing writer in two 2024 books; Feminist Theatre Then & Now: Celebrating 50 years and Encounters with James Baldwin: Celebrating 100 Years.

SuAndi has performed at poetry venues and festivals both nationally and internationally. She has also developed performance works with a sustained structure and visual component to them, including This is All I've Got to Say (1993) and The Story of M, commissioned by the Institute of Contemporary Arts in 1994. The Story of M was a solo performance piece written in tribute to SuAndi's mother. While sitting in a white-screened hospital ward, visual projections of family photographs accompany the performer's memories of her mother's life and death. The Story of M is included on the A-level English Literature syllabus offered by EdExcel Examination Board (2017), introduced by Deirdre Osborne.

SuAndi has written two librettos: Mary Seacole had a West End opening and toured Britain in 2000, and The Calling was performed by the BBC Philharmonic in 2005.

Since 2001, SuAndi has coordinated the regional celebration of Black History Month in the North West.

Afro Solo UK chronicles the lives of African men in the UK since 1925. Strength of our Mothers (2019) was a series of interviews with 23 white women in interracial relationships with African and Afro-Caribbean men. Her poems "Intergenerational Trauma" and "Aroma of memory" are included in the 2019 anthology New Daughters of Africa, edited by Margaret Busby.

The project SussedBlackWoman is a collaboration between The Mixed Museum and SuAndi that, through her life and creative work, explores North-West England's history of racial mixing, developing a digital resource based on materials provided by her, including letters, poems and photographs.

== Awards and recognition ==
In 1996, SuAndi was awarded a Winston Churchill Fellowship.

In the 1999 New Year Honours, she was appointed an OBE for her contributions to black art in Britain.

SuAndi received a Windrush Inspirational Award in 2003, and a NESTA Dreamtime Award in 2005.

In 2014, she became an Honorary Creative Writing Fellow at Leicester University, and she has received honorary doctorates from both the University of Lancaster, in 2015 for her outstanding contribution to British art, and from Manchester Metropolitan University in 2018, for her "significant contribution to art and culture, in particular to the black arts sector and within the North West".

In 2024, she was elected an Honorary Fellow of the Royal Society of Literature (RSL), and was also the recipient of their Benson Medal for lifelong achievement, which honours service to literature across a whole career.

== Selected works ==
- Style in Performance. Purple Heather & Pankhurst Press, 1990. ISBN 1-871426-30-8
- Nearly Forty. Spike Books, 1992. ISBN 0-9518978-0-2
- There Will be No Tears. Manchester: Pankhurst Press, 1995.
- (Editor) 4 for more: poses a contextualisation of black work juxtaposed to the larger arena. Manchester: ArtBlacklive Publication for Black Arts Alliance, 2002. ISBN 0954276604
- I Love the Blackness of my People, Pankhurst Press, 2003.
- "Africa Lives On in We: Histories and Futures of Black Women Artists", in E. Aston et al. (eds), Feminist Futures?, Palgrave Macmillan, 2006.
- The Story of M. London: Oberon Books, 2017. ISBN 9781786821164
- (Editor) Strength of Our Mothers. Independent Publishing Network, 2019. ISBN 1789721296
