= Shoggy Tosh =

British–Nigerian author (born 1974)

Shoggy Olusoga Olugbenga Tosh (born 9 January 1974) is a British–Nigerian publisher, author, sports broadcasting analyst and television presenter mentored by Tim Omotoso. He is the founder of The Official Stars Homepage Magazine, TV & PR.

== Personal life ==
Tosh was born in Birmingham, England. He worked as a manager at Tesco from 2004 to 2007 before resigning to establish his own magazine (TOSH Mag) and publish his debut book, Divine Favour. He left England for Nigeria at the age of 5 and returned when he was 22 to continue his studies at London South Bank University.

He is married to Lanre and they have two children, Happiness and David.

== Career ==
Shoggy Tosh worked as a sales attendant at Upper Crust, London Bridge, a communication officer at Tower Hotel, a sales officer at Dial-a-Phone, and an assistant manager at Marks & Spencer, Waterloo, before he was appointed as a manager at Tesco, Elmers End. In 2007, he resigned from his post and decided to focus on his major interests – media, journalism and writing. In 2006, he wrote the book Divine Favour

Tosh is the publisher of TOSH Mag, TV & PR – a web-based entertainment magazine, online TV and public relations company based in London, United Kingdom.

== Television ==
Tosh's TV show, tagged TOSH Mag TV Show first aired on BEN Television in 2009 and was broadcast for 18 months to viewers across Europe via BSkyB and Sky Television and Africa via MyTV. It was scripted and produced by Tosh and Femi Best Touch, and won over eight international awards including double BEFFTAs and National Gospel Awards. Tosh also won the TV presenter of the year award for 2012 at the Africa Gospel Music Awards in London. His new TV show to be released in 2015 is tagged Superstars with Shoggy Tosh, with guests like Brazilian superstar, Roberto Carlos and Nigerian and international footballer, John Utaka.

Tosh currently contributes as a TV Sports analyst every Friday night (22:30 GMT) at Arise News in London, seldom at Vox Africa – both platforms on BSkyB and Sky Television, on Channels TV, TVC and Galaxy TV – both on DSTV platforms in Lagos, Nigeria.

== Music career ==
On 9 January 2014, he released his debut rap single, "eMUJOW" featuring Shady Blue and Jamaican gospel dancehall star, Dunamis Reignz. The song was written and arranged by Tosh (with the exception of a verse and the hook) and produced by Pastorchild at the 709 Studios in London. It won an award and the music video by Femi Best Touch was shot in September 2014 and released on 9 January 2015 exclusively on Ancient of Days TV, South Africa and Vevo on 31 January 2015. All profit made from the song goes to charity. "eMUJOW" means, 'dance' in Yoruba.

== Discography ==
- "eMUJOW" (9 January 2014) – Debut single

== Awards and nominations ==
Tosh received several awards, including two BEFFTA awards, edging out Alesha Dixon, Makosi Musambasi and former England and Arsenal F.C. football star turned TV presenter, Ian Wright.

=== Awards ===
- 2006 – Heart of Gold, TESCO Elmers End, Kent, United Kingdom
- 2010 – Best Magazine – TOSH Mag, at Euro & Afro Awards, Alicante, Spain
- 2010 – Best TV Show – TOSH Mag TV in collaboration with Femi Best Touch, at Euro & Afro Awards, Alicante, Spain
- 2010 – Best TV Presenter – at BEFFTA Awards, London
- 2010 – Best TV Show – TOSH Mag TV in collaboration with Femi Best Touch, at BEFFTA Awards, London
- 2011 – Best Magazine – TOSH Mag, National Gospel Awards, Nigeria
- 2011 – Best TV – TOSH Mag TV in collaboration with Femi Best Touch, at National Gospel Awards, Nigeria
- 2011 – Best TV Presenter / Host (Special Category)- at Gospel Music, Awards, Ireland
- 2012 – TV Presenter of the Year – at Africa Gospel Music Awards, London
- 2014 – Best African Praise/Contemporary song at PGMA awards, London.

=== Nominations ===
- 2011 – Best TV Personality – BEFFTA Awards, London
- 2011 – Best Presenter – BEFFTA Awards, London
- 2012 – Journalist of the Year – BEFFTA Awards, London
- 2014 – Humanitarian Award – Nigerian Broadcasters Merit Award
- 2014 – TV Programme of the Year (Youthful to be Useful with Shoggy Tosh & Vicky Omotoso) – Africa Gospel Music Awards
