= Shane Ryan (social activist) =

British social reformer, activist, writer, and former Chirf Executive of Future Men

Shane Ryan MBE
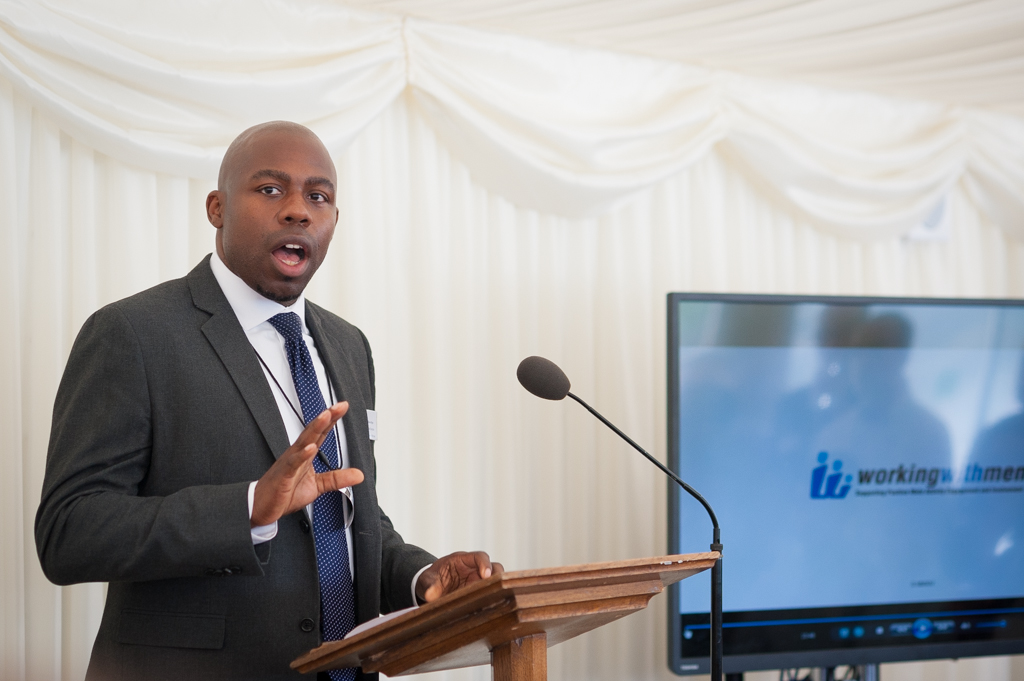
- Ryan in London, 2014
- Born: 13 May 1969 (age 57); London, England
- Occupation: British social reformer

Shane Ryan MBE (born 13 May 1969) is a British social reformer/activist, writer and formerly, the Chief Executive of Future Men, a charity supporting men and boys in the United Kingdom and also secretariat for the all-party parliamentary group (APPG) On Fatherhood. He was previously Deputy Director at the National Lottery Community Fund , and Global Executive Director of The Avast Foundation , a worldwide social impact organization, before returning to the National Lottery Community Fund.

Ryan speaking at the a festival in Southbank London in 2014

Ryan is best known for his work in highlighting the plight of less affluent boys in the British education system and teenaged fathers in the UK, as well as speaking nationally about support for unemployed young men and his work related to fathers and families. In 2018 in the wake of the Grenfell Tower fire, Ryan helped to set up and is currently the Chair of The Grenfell Children and Young Peoples Fund, along with the Queens Park Rangers Trust and the Evening Standard newspaper.
