= Joan Anim-Addo =

Grenadian-born academic, poet, playwright and publisher

- Born: Grenada
- Occupations: Poet; Playwright; Publisher

Academic work
- Discipline: Literature
- Institutions: Goldsmiths, University of London

Joan Anim-Addo is a Grenadian-born academic, poet, playwright and publisher, who is Emeritus Professor of Caribbean Literature and Culture in the English and Creative Writing Department at Goldsmiths, University of London, where she co-founded with Deirdre Osborne the MA Black British Literature, the world's first postgraduate degree in this field.

== Academic career ==
Born in Grenada in the Caribbean, Joan Anim-Addo went to London, England, as a schoolgirl in 1961.

She joined the faculty of Goldsmiths, University of London, in 1994, as founder and Director of the Centre for Caribbean and Diaspora Studies.

She has taught at Vassar College in the USA and lectured at many universities internationally, including SUNY Geneseo (USA), the University of Turku in Finland and the University of Trento (Italy). She has also led workshops on creative non-fiction writing.

At Goldsmiths, she is the convenor for the undergraduate options "Caribbean Women's Writing" and "Black British Literature", as well as convenor of the "Literature of the Caribbean and its Diasporas" pathway within the Comparative Literary Studies MA programme. She also co-convened, with Deirdre Osborne, the world's first MA in Black British Literature, launched in 2015, which Hannah Pool described as a "landmark for black culture", while novelist Alex Wheatle saw as adding "to the fabric of British literature".

== Publishing and writing ==
In 1995, Anim-Addo founded Mango Publishing, specialising in the "Caribbean voice", with a particular focus on women's writing, the Mango list featuring books by such writers as Beryl Gilroy, Velma Pollard and Jacob Ross.

In 2008, Anim-Addo wrote the libretto to Imoinda, a re-writing of Aphra Behn's Oroonoko (first published in 1688). Anim-Addo's other published work includes poetry collections — Haunted by History in 2004 and Janie: Cricketing Lady in 2006 – and a literary history, Touching the Body: History, Language and African-Caribbean Women's Writing (2007). She co-edited I Am Black, White, Yellow: An Introduction to the Black Body in Europe and Interculturality and Gender (2009), and is the founder-editor of New Mango Season, a journal of Caribbean women's writing.

In December 2016, Anim-Addo was honoured with a Lifetime Achievement Award for "invaluable contributions to literature and to literary and cultural studies" by the literary quarterly journal Callaloo. Her work appears in the 2019 anthology New Daughters of Africa, edited by Margaret Busby.

In 2020, Anim-Addo featured in Phenomenal Women, the first photographic exhibition honouring black female professors in Britain, curated by Nicola Rollock.

In 2021, with Deirdre Osborne and Kadija Sesay, Anim-Addo curated This is The Canon: Decolonize Your Bookshelf in 50 Books – in the words of Nikesh Shukla "a vital and timely introduction to some of the best books I've ever read" – which is described as "[s]ubverting the reading lists that have long defined Western cultural life", highlighting alternatives by people of African or Asian descent and indigenous peoples.

== Selected bibliography ==
- Longest Journey: A History of Black Lewisham, Deptford Forum Publishing, 1995, ISBN 978-1898536215
- Framing the Word: Gender & Genre in Caribbean Women's Writing (editor), Whiting & Birch, 1996
- Sugar, Spices And Human Cargo: An Early Black History of Greenwich, Greenwich Leisure Services, 1996
- Haunted by History: Poetry, London: Mango Publishing, 2004, ISBN 978-1902294032
- Another Doorway Visible Inside the Museum (editor), London: Mango Publishing, 2004
- Janie: Cricketing Lady : a Journey Poem (1920s–2004) : Carnival and Hurricane Poems, London: Mango Publishing, 2006, ISBN 978-1902294261
- I Am Black/White/Yellow: An Introduction to the Black Body in Europe (co-editor, with Suzanne Scafe), London: Mango Publishing, 2007
- Imoinda, or She Who Will Lose Her Name: A Play for Twelve Voices in Three Acts, Mango Publishing, 2008
- (With Deirdre Osborne and Kadija Sesay) This is the Canon: Decolonize Your Bookshelves in 50 Books. London: Greenfinch/Quercus, 2021; ISBN 978-1529414592.

=== As editor ===
- 1996. Framing The Word: Gender & Genre in Caribbean Women's Writing. London: Whiting & Birch. ISBN 978-1871177916
- 1999. (With Jacob Ross) Voice Memory Ashes: Lest We Forget. London: Mango Publishing. ISBN 978-1902294049
- 1999. Another Doorway: Visible Inside the Museum. London: Mango Publishing. ISBN 978-1902294018
- 2002. Centre of Remembrance: Memory and Caribbean Women's Literature. London: Mango Publishing. ISBN 978-1902294025
- 2007. (With Suzanne Scafe) I am Black, White, Yellow: An Introduction to the Black Body in Europe. London: Mango Publishing. ISBN 978-1902294315
- 2009. (With Giovanna Covi and Mina Karavanta) Interculturality and Gender. London: Mango Publishing. ISBN 978 1 902294 40 7
