= Susan Stockwell =

British artist

Susan Stockwell is a contemporary British artist, described as a sculptor who makes subtly political work about materials and their inherent content and histories, with injustice and inequality as overarching themes. Her work addresses political, social, ecological and feminist issues, using her trademark motifs and metaphors of maps, stacks, dresses, money, recycled computer components and other everyday materials and products.

== Life and work ==
Born in Manchester, England, August 1962, Stockwell attained her MA from the Royal College of Art in 1993 and a BA in fine art from Sheffield Hallam University (1988). She had taught extensively in the United Kingdom and United States of America.

According to Sylviane Gold, writing in The New York Times, Stockwell's sculpture can be "elegant and eerie". Robert Clark of The Guardian stated that Stockwell "misuses everyday objects and domestic materials to enchanting effect." Key pieces include "America", a map of the USA made from computer boards. Stockwell's work is featured in numerous books, including, 50 Women Sculptors 2020 The Art of Walking: a field guide edited by David Evans Black Dog Publishing. The Seas and the Mobility of Islamic Art Yale University Press 2021, https://www.susanstockwell.co.uk/books?lightbox=comp-kmxgrxfa_runtime_dataItem-kmxgrxfcitems1.

She has won numerous awards, including a Bursary Award from the Arts Council England, Royal Society of British Sculptors, a Taiwan-England Artists Fellowship and Travel Award from The British Council and The Artists Information Company. She has completed numerous successful public and private commissions including works for Bedfordshire University, BlackRock Investments, The Royal Shakespeare Company, the National Army Museum and the London Transport Museum.

Examples of Stockwell's work are held in public and private art collections, including the Victoria and Albert Museum, London, The Tropenmuseum, Amsterdam, the Francis H. Williams Collection, Wellesley, Mass, the Yale Centre for British Art, United States and the House of European History in Brussels. She has exhibited throughout Britain, as well as globally including at TATE Modern, London, The National Museum of China, Beijing, The Katonah Museum of Art, USA and Manchester City Art Gallery, UK.
