= Jenny McLeod (playwright) =

British playwright (born 1963)

Jenny McLeod (born 1963) is a British playwright. McLeod grew up in Nottingham. She started writing plays in the middle of her A Levels after seeing an advertisement in a local paper. Her play Cricket at Camp David won the Writing 87 workshop, and she went on to write Island Life for Monstrous Regiment Theatre Company. In 1991–2 she was writer-in-residence at the Nottingham Playhouse in 1991–1992. After winning a bursary from Thames Television, she was in residence at the Tricycle Theatre in 1995.

Island Life, first performed at the Nottingham Playhouse, pursued the stories of three women in an old people's home. In Raising Fires (1994), a West Indian orphan girl Tilda, brought to early-17th-century Essex by a minister, is accused of witchcraft. Poison (2000) was adapted to Britain from a South African musical version of Othello originally written and directed by David Kramer.

== Plays ==
=== Performances ===
- Cricket at Camp David. Octagon Theatre, Bolton, 1988.
- Island Life. Monstroud Regiment Theatre Company, Nottingham Playhouse, 1988.
- The Mango Tree. Strange Fruit Theatre Company, 1990.
- Raising Fires. The Bush Theatre, London, 1994.
- The Wild at Heart Club. National Youth Theatre, 1995.
- Victor and the Ladies. Tricycle Theatre, 1995.
- It's You!. 1995.
- Poison. Tricycle Theatre, 2000.

=== Publications ===
- The Wake (TV) in Vicky Licorish and Philippa Giles, eds., Debut on Two BBC Books, 1990
- Island Life, in Gillian Hanna, ed., Monstrous Regiment: A Collective Celebration, Nick Hern Books, 1991
- Raising Fires, in Bush Plays, 1993.
