= Courttia Newland =

British writer

- Born: 25 August 1973 (age 52); London, U.K.
- Occupations: Novelist, playwright
- Notable work: The Scholar (1997); Society Within (1999); Snakeskin (2002)
- Website: courttianewland.com

Courttia Newland (born 25 August 1973) is a British writer.

== Background ==
Born in 1973 in West London, to parents of Jamaican and Barbadian heritage. Newland grew up in Shepherd's Bush, where he became a rapper and music producer who, together with friends, released a Drum and bass white label record.

== Writing ==
=== Novels ===
In 1997, Newland published his first novel, The Scholar. Further novels followed, including Society Within (1999), Snakeskin (2002) and The Gospel According to Cane (2013).

His most recent novel, A River Called Time was published in 2021 to generally positive critical attention, with Kirkus stating: "This is an ambitiously imagined book that, by removing the European lens on African cultures, creates a new reality that allows us to question how we view our own. Complex and multilayered, this novel opens the door to the possibilities of noncolonial worlds." For the TLS reviewer: "Courttia Newland's new novel presents us with a dystopian multiverse imagined at thrilling scale." Adam Roberts concluded that "no one can doubt the sheer energy and verve of Newland's vision", while Publishers Weekly said: "This is sure to please fans of thought-provoking speculative fiction." In July 2022, A River Called Time was announced on the shortlist of the Arthur C. Clarke Award (alongside books by Kazuo Ishiguro, Harry Josephine Giles, Arkady Martine, Mercurio D. Rivera and Aliya Whiteley).

=== Plays ===
Newland wrote his first play, Estates of Mind, in 1998. His second play, an adaptation of Euripides' The Women of Troy, was a success at the 1999 Edinburgh Festival, being followed in 2000 by his third play was The Far Side. His subsequent productions include Mother's Day (2002), B is for Black (2003), Whistling Maggie (2005), Sweet Yam Kisses (2006), White Open Spaces – A Question of Courage (2006), and Look to the Sky (2011).

=== Other literary activity ===
In 2000, Newland co-edited (with Kadija Sesay) the anthology IC3: The Penguin Book of New Black Writing in Britain (reissued in a 20th-anniversary edition), and his short stories have featured in many other anthologies, including The Time Out Book of London Short Stories: Vol 2, England Calling:24 Stories for the 21st Century and Disco 2000. He co-edited The Global Village (2009) with Monique Roffey.

Newland tours extensively for the British Council, and has been writer-in-residence for Trinity College, Dublin, and Georgetown University, Washington DC. He has also been a writer-in-residence for the charity First Story. He has taught creative writing workshops and performed readings in countries as diverse as Russia, Gambia, and Singapore. He was a Royal Literary Fund Fellow at the London College of Communication (2003–2004).

With Tania Hershman, he co-authored the guide Writing Short Stories: A Writers' and Artists' Companion (Bloomsbury, 2015).

Newland was a co-writer for Steve McQueen's five-part anthology film series Small Axe, broadcast in November 2020.

== Awards and recognition ==
Newland was shortlisted for the 2007 Crime Writers' Association Dagger in the Library Award, the 2010 Alfred Fagon Award and longlisted for the 2011 Frank O'Connor Award.

In 2016, he was awarded the Tayner Barbers Award for science fiction writing and the Roland Rees Bursary for playwriting.

In 2022, Newland's novel A River Called Time was shortlisted for the Arthur C. Clarke Award.

== Books ==
- The Scholar, novel (London: Abacus, 1997; Little, Brown, 2001, ISBN 9780349108766)
- Society Within, novel (London: Abacus, 1999; Little, Brown, 2000, ISBN 9780349111803)
- Snakeskin, novel (London: Abacus, 2002)
- The Dying Wish: A James and Sinclair Mystery, novella (London: Abacus, 2006)
- Music for the Off-Key: 12 Macabre Short Stories, short-story collection (London: Peepal Tree Press, 2006, ISBN 9781845230401)
- The Global Village (2009)
- A Book of Blues, short-story collection (Flambard Press, 2011, ISBN 9781906601294)
- The Gospel According to Cane, novel (Saqi, 2013, ISBN 9781846591587)
- A River Called Time, novel (Canongate Books, 2021, ISBN 9781786897077)
- Cosmogramma (Canongate Books, 2021, ISBN 9781786897107)

== Play productions ==
- Estates of Mind, London, The Post Office Theatre, July 1998;
- Women of Troy 2099, London, The Post Office Theatre, 31 July 1999;
- The Far Side, London, The Tricycle Theatre, Summer 13 August 2000; London, The Tabernacle Community Centre, 22 October 2001;
- Mother’s Day, Hammersmith, The Lyric Theatre, 16 September 2002;
- B is for Black, London, Oval House Theatre, 14 October 2003;
- Whistling Maggie, London, Oval House Theatre Upstairs, 29 November 2005; different production 13 June 2006;
- Sweet Yam Kisses, Hammersmith, The Lyric Theatre, 11 February 2006.
- Look to the Sky, National Tour, October–November 2011

== Produced stories ==
- An Age Old Problem, 10-minute motion picture, Brent Youth Arts Service Crime Diversion Project, Massive Video, 1996;
- Rage, 10-minute motion picture, written and directed by Newland, Massive Video, 1997;
