= Afrobeat (book) =

1999 anthology edited by Patsy Antoine

Afrobeat: New Black British Fiction
- Editor: Patsy Antoine
- Language: English
- Genre: Anthology
- Publisher: Pulp Faction
- Publication date: 1999
- Publication place: United Kingdom
- Pages: 125
- ISBN: 978-1-899-57108-6

Afrobeat: New Black British Fiction was a 1999 anthology of Black British writing edited by Patsy Antoine. It was published in London by Pulp Faction.

Afrobeat featured contributions from new writers, including Saga Prize winners Joanna Traynor and Judith Bryan, and work by Patricia Cumper, Brenda Emmanus, Lucas Loblack, Courttia Newland, Norma Pollock, Deborah Ricketts, Roger Robinson, Kadija Sesay, Natalie Stewart, Yinka Sunmonu, and J. J. Amoworo Wilson. Twelve of the fifteen contributors were women. Topics treated included HIV, racism, confessional television shows, obsession and new racism.

== Contents ==
1. Roger Robinson, "Glow"
2. Judith Bryan, "The roaring man"
3. Patricia Cumper, "True love"
4. Courttia Newland, "The Great white hate"
5. Patsy Antoine, "Joy"
6. J. J. Amoworo Wilson, "Johnny can sleep easy now"
7. Lucas Loblack, "The car"
8. Natalie Stewart, "Who am I?"
9. Kadija Sesay, "The price of maybe"
10. Deborah Ricketts, "White walls"
11. Brenda Emmanus, "Trust me"
12. Joanna Traynor, "Crates"
13. Yinka Sunmonu, "A good buy"
14. Norma Pollock, "The negative"
15. Norma Pollock, "A suitable candidate"
