= Milos Kirek =

Czech actor (1946–1993)

- Born: Miloš Kučírek; 25 April 1946; Prostějov, Czechoslovakia
- Died: 9 February 1993 (aged 46); Los Angeles, California
- Other name: Milow Kirek
- Occupations: Actor; Renovator; Theatre director, producer and writer; Translator
- Years active: 1970–1991 (film & TV)

Milos Kirek (born Miloš Kučírek; 25 April 1946 – 9 February 1993) was a Czech actor. He was known for playing the Boss of the villainous gang in 1974 BAFTA-awarding winning children's drama Soldier and Me, based on David Line's 1966 novel Run for Your Life.

== Early life ==
Kirek was born on 25 April 1946 in Prostějov. Growing up in a family of teachers in Havířov, he had an ambition as a child to become an actor. Following graduation from high school, he unsuccessfully applied to the Academy of Performing Arts in Prague (AMU). Upon the third attempt, he was accepted into the directing class.

Aged 17, Kirek left home and became stagehand at the Petr Bezruč Theatre in Ostrava. There, he met director Jan Kačer who cast him in minor roles. The duo then worked at the Činoherní klub in Prague.

== Career ==
Upon partaking in Prague Spring, protesting when Russian tanks rolled into the country in 1968, Kirek fled to England, arriving almost penniless with very little possessions and leaving his parents behind in his home country.

There, he moved into a flat in Fulham. (The flat became a centre for many LAMDA students amongst others.) During the day, Kirek worked as a waiter and cleaner in London and at night, would attend English classes. Within a year, he had got himself a job as deputy stage manager and actor at Perth. Returning to London, he resumed his cleaning job when in 1970, the acting work started to come in.

Having already featured in Perth Theatre's 1969 pantomime of Mother Goose, Kirek made his English stage debut in a one-man show entitled Don't Touch My Chair. This was followed by more regular work including directing Jeremy Irons in Nikolai Gogol's one-man Diary of a Madman, as well as writing, directing and producing for the Fringe theatre, being involved in political satires and translating works from Russian. In 1981, Kirek performed with Pindar Productions Inc. in Twelve Angry Jurors at the Theatre of Arts in San Pedro.

His acting work includes appearances in British TV shows such as Special Branch, A Family at War, Justice, Dixon of Dock Green, Spyder's Web, Colditz, The Protectors, Moonbase 3, Sykes, Thriller, The Professionals, Tinker Tailor Soldier Spy, The Sandbaggers and Squadron, as well as film parts in Omen III: The Final Conflict and the unofficial James Bond movie Never Say Never Again. Rather ironically, he mostly ended up playing Russian spies.

In 1983, Kirek moved to Los Angeles, appearing in American TV shows including Scarecrow and Mrs. King, St. Elsewhere, Days of Our Lives, MacGyver and Murder, She Wrote, as well as continuing to work in the theatre. One production was starring in The Pawnbroker by Edward Lewis Wallant at Center Stage Theater in 1991.

== Personal life ==
Along with Chilean director Charles Elsesser, Kirek partook in an edition of BBC documentary series The Lively Arts entitled Refugees Reflect. Broadcast 21 November 1976 (having been postponed from 24 October 1976 and including a scene with the actor playing a waiter and an old lady), the two men spoke to host Melvyn Bragg about their experiences in their native countries and in their new one.

When arriving in the United Kingdom, Kirek obtained a British passport and modified his surname from Kučírek for convenience. To stay and work in the United States, he obtained a green card by marrying a lawyer. Whilst living in both countries, the actor also made a living in between filming and acting by renovating houses so as to earn extra money to pay bills. He also trained himself to be a skilled craftsman.

In April 1989, Kirek returned to his homeland to visit his family. (On the plane journey, he was reunited with Kačer.) At the time, the actor predicted that the regime would fall by Christmas and that Václav Havel would become president. True to his word, the Velvet Revolution occurred in November 1989, resulting in the collapse of the communist regime in Czechoslovakia with Havel being elected to office on 29 December 1989.

Having no children, Kirek died in a Los Angeles hospital from AIDS.
