= Rorschach (character) =

Comic book antihero

- Walter Kovacs as Rorschach. Art by Dave Gibbons

Publication information
- Publisher: DC Comics
- First appearance: Watchmen #1 (September 1986)
- Created by: Alan Moore; Dave Gibbons

In-story information
- Alter ego: Walter Joseph Kovacs
- Species: Human
- Team affiliations: Crimebusters
- Partnerships: Nite Owl II
- Abilities: Expert hand-to-hand combatant; Use of improvised weapons; Brilliant detective and journalist

Walter Joseph Kovacs, also known as Rorschach, is a fictional antihero and one of the two main protagonists (alongside Nite Owl) of the graphic novel limited series Watchmen, published by DC Comics in 1986. Rorschach was created by writer Alan Moore with artist Dave Gibbons; as with most of the main characters in the series, he was an analogue for a Charlton Comics character; in this case, Steve Ditko's the Question. Moore also modeled Rorschach on Mr. A, another Steve Ditko creation on whom the Question was originally based.

While Watchmen has an ensemble cast, many consider Rorschach to be the primary protagonist as he drives most of the plot forward and serves as the series' narrator. In the beginning of the story, he is introduced as the only masked vigilante to remain active on his own terms and initiative, a criminal outlaw as opposed to other former superheroes now covertly employed by the U.S. government. A ruthless crime-fighter, Rorschach believes in moral absolutism—good and evil as pure ends, with no shades of gray—which compels him to seek to punish any evidence of evil at all costs. His mask displays a constantly morphing inkblot based on the ambiguous designs used in Rorschach inkblot tests, also his namesake, with the mask's black and white coloring consistent with his sense and view of morality.

The original character was positively received, with multiple references in other comic titles and appearances in other media. He reappears in the Before Watchmen comic book prequel including his own miniseries. Rorschach made his live-action debut in DC's 20th full-length live-action feature film Watchmen, played by Jackie Earle Haley, who also voices him in the video game Watchmen: The End Is Nigh.

A successor to the Rorschach mantle, named Reggie Long, debuted in the sequel limited series Doomsday Clock, which connects the Watchmen universe with the mainstream DC Universe. Another incarnation of Rorschach, Wil Myerson, appears in the DC Black Label limited series Rorschach, a standalone sequel to Watchmen.

== Publication history ==
Dave Gibbons' original design of Rorschach

As with the rest of the main characters of Watchmen, Alan Moore based Rorschach on Charlton Comics characters, using them as a "starting point". The characters Rorschach was specifically based on were the Question (a Charlton character) and Mr. A, two comic book characters created by Steve Ditko.

Ditko, who was inspired by the writings of Ayn Rand's personal philosophy of Objectivism, created both the Question and Mr. A as followers of the ideology. Regarding Rand's philosophy, Moore said he personally found it "laughable". In spite of this, Moore had a healthy respect for Ditko despite having different views politically. Moore recalled that Ditko's very right-wing agenda was quite interesting to him at the time, and that "probably led to me portraying Rorschach as an extremely right-wing character".

In trying to create Rorschach, Moore said he was trying to "come up with this quintessential Steve Ditko character—someone who's got a funny name, whose surname begins with a 'K,' who's got an oddly designed mask". On how he decided Rorschach's name, Moore recalls:

I noticed, when I was a teenager, that Ditko had got some fixation about the letter K, probably because it occurs in his own name. It's sort of "Kafka," and "Ditko," and there seemed to be a lot of Ditko characters with prominent Ks ... Ted Kord ... Ditko seemed very fond of that sort of sound, so in some half-assed way, that observation influenced me in giving Rorschach the name Walter Kovacs.

The Question was used as the prototype for creating Rorschach, while Mr. A, being a far more radical right-wing character than the mainstream-suited Question, served as the main inspiration for Rorschach's right-wing views as well as his black-and-white morality. Moore came to view Rorschach as a logical extension of both Mr. A and the Question. On the other hand, upon being asked whether he had seen Watchmen, Ditko himself described Rorschach as being "like Mister A, except Rorschach is insane."

... Rorschach, was perhaps the most disturbing hero ever created for comics. His brutal perception of black-and-white morality reflected writer Alan Moore's critical deconstruction of the whole notion of heroes—a popular theme recurring in comic books since the 1980s.

— Bradford W. Wright

Moore stated that Rorschach was created as a way of exploring what an archetypical Batman-type character—a driven, vengeance-fueled vigilante—would be like in the real world. He concluded that the short answer was "a nutcase". Moore also stated that the tone of Rorschach's diary was inspired by the Son of Sam letters David Berkowitz sent to the newspapers, and that his speech patterns were based on Herbie the Fat Fury.

While Moore came up with Rorschach's name and descriptions, Dave Gibbons was in charge of the character's appearance. In Gibbons' initial designs, Rorschach wore white clothing which had inkblots not only on his head but all over his body. He also wore a large blue trench-coat, red gloves, red-blue hat and items that look like jodhpurs or spats over his boots. When designing the characters of the series, Gibbons said Rorschach was his favorite to draw due to his relatively simpler features. He described:

If I had a favorite character to draw, ... the one that I'll draw is Rorschach. Basically, you just have to draw a hat. If you can draw a hat, then you've drawn Rorschach, you just draw kind of a shape for his face and put some black blobs on it and you're done. So he's a favorite to draw in that circumstance.

Moore said he did not foresee the death of Rorschach until the fourth issue when he realized that his refusal to compromise would result in his not surviving the story. He claimed that initially he knew a lot about the character's surface mannerisms, but did not realize what was inside him until he "started to dig." Moore added that Rorschach had a "king-sized" deathwish due to his psychologically troubled life, and actively wanted to die but in his own dignified and honorable way, no matter how "twisted" it might have been. In response to why he chose to have Rorschach take off his mask to face death at the end, Moore said that he thought it "just felt right". He believed that it "is not the mask talking, it's not Rorschach, it's the actual human being [Walter Kovacs] that is somewhere under there".

== Fictional character biography ==
=== Before Watchmen ===
Walter Joseph Kovacs was born on March 21, 1940, the son of Sylvia Kovacs, who was a prostitute, and an unknown father only known to Kovacs as "Charlie". His mother was frequently abusive and condescending towards him. In July 1951, at the age of 11, Kovacs became involved in a violent fight with two older bullies; subsequently, his living conditions were finally looked into. After his home was investigated, Kovacs was removed from his mother's care and put in "The Lillian Charlton Home for Problem Children" in New Jersey, where he rapidly seemed to improve, excelling at schoolwork as well as gymnastics and amateur boxing. In 1956, after leaving the Charlton Home when he was 16, Kovacs took a job as a garment worker in a dress shop, which he found "bearable but unpleasant" partly because he had to handle women's clothing; it was here that he acquired a certain dress fabric that he would later fashion into the mask he wears as Rorschach. His mother was brutally murdered by her pimp, George Paterson, who forced her to drink Drano cleaning fluid and dumped her body in the back alleyway. In 1962, Kovacs scavenged the material from a rejected dress that had been special-ordered by a young woman with an Italian name. Though Kovacs learned how to cut and fashion the material successfully with heated implements, he soon grew bored with it, as it served him no real purpose at the time.

Two years later when buying a newspaper on his way to work in March 1964, Kovacs read about the rape and murder of Kitty Genovese, who he believed was the Italian woman who had rejected the dress. Ashamed by what he read about the unresponsiveness of her neighbors, Kovacs became disillusioned with the underlying apathy that he saw as inherent in most people. Inspired by Genovese's fate, Kovacs returned home, made "a face [he] could bear to look at in the mirror" from the dress's fabric, and began fighting crime as the vigilante Rorschach. Initially, Kovacs left criminals alive, but bloodied, for the police to arrest, leaving a calling card in the form of a Rorschach test at every crime scene. In the mid 1960s, he teamed up with Nite Owl II, a partnership which proved highly successful at battling organized crime.

In 1975, an investigation into the kidnapping of a young girl named Blair Roche led to the transformation of the "soft" Kovacs into the ruthlessly uncompromising Rorschach. He tracked the kidnapping to a man named Gerald Grice. At Grice's shack, Kovacs found evidence Grice had killed the girl and had fed her remains to his dogs. Discovering this, Rorschach suffered a psychotic breakdown, killed the dogs with Grice's meat cleaver and waited for his arrival. When Grice returned, Rorschach hurled the corpses of the dogs through his windows, handcuffed him to a stove, and poured kerosene around him. Leaving Grice a hacksaw, Rorschach told him that his only chance to escape would be by cutting off his hand. Rorschach then set the shack on fire and left. No one emerged. During a later psychological evaluation, the vigilante stated that Kovacs went into the shack, but that Rorschach came out.

When the Keene Act was passed in 1977 to outlaw vigilantes, Rorschach responded by killing a wanted serial rapist and leaving his body outside a police station with a note bearing one word: "never!"

=== In Watchmen ===
By 1985 and the events of Watchmen, Rorschach is the vigilante who continues to operate in defiance of the Keene Act, the rest having retired or become government operatives. He investigates the murder of a man named Edward Blake, discovering that he is the Comedian. He believes that someone is picking off costumed superheroes, a view that strengthens when Doctor Manhattan is forced into exile and when Adrian Veidt, the former vigilante known as Ozymandias, is targeted in an assassination attempt. Rorschach questions Moloch, a former supervillain who unexpectedly attends Blake's funeral, who tells him what little he knows. Later, after reading a note written by Moloch telling him to come over for more information, Rorschach visits him again, only to find him dead, shot through the head. The police, tipped off anonymously over the phone, surround the house. Rorschach scolds himself for falling into such an obvious trap, and is arrested after a fight, in which Rorschach tries to escape by jumping through a window, but is unmasked. After the unmasking, Rorschach is revealed to be the red-haired man who, in addition to being the first character to appear in the series, was shown several times in the early chapters carrying a sign reading "THE END IS NIGH".

Rorschach is sent to a prison where many of its inmates are criminals he put away, including Big Figure, a dwarf crime boss who is hungry for Rorschach's blood. During his incarceration, he is interviewed by the prison psychologist Dr. Malcolm Long. Long believes he can help rehabilitate him; instead, Rorschach's explanation of his life and his justifications for his uncompromising worldview lead Long to question his own views.

One day during lunch, one of the inmates attempts to attack Rorschach with a shiv, whereupon Rorschach throws the boiling-oil contents of a deep-fryer into his face in self-defense. As the guards grab and begin to beat him, Rorschach hoarsely yells at the watching crowd, "None of you seem to understand. I'm not locked in here with you. You're locked in here with me." After the inmate dies, the prison breaks out in a riot. The Big Figure and two of his associates try to kill Rorschach, but he outwits and ultimately kills them all in rapid succession. Rorschach's two former colleagues, Nite Owl II and Silk Spectre II, begin to take his "mask killer" theory seriously and break him out of jail to follow up on it.

After the prison break, Doctor Manhattan comes back from his self-exile to transport Silk Spectre II to Mars. After acquiring a spare costume from his apartment, Rorschach, along with Nite Owl, enters underworld bars to find out who ordered the assassination attempt on Veidt. They obtain a name, a company called Pyramid Deliveries, and then break into Veidt's office. Nite Owl correctly deduces Veidt's password and finds that he runs Pyramid Deliveries. Rorschach, who has been keeping a journal throughout the duration of the novel, realizes that they may be no match for Veidt. He makes one last entry in his journal, stating his certainty that Veidt is responsible for whatever might happen next, and drops it into a mailbox.

Nite Owl and Rorschach fly out to Antarctica. There they learn the true nature of the conspiracy and Veidt's motivations: to unite the world against a perceived alien threat and stop the possibility of a nuclear holocaust. Veidt then reveals that he set his plan into motion well before they arrived. Doctor Manhattan and Silk Spectre II arrive at the base after viewing the carnage Veidt's false alien has wrought on New York City. Despite their mutual horror, Nite Owl, Silk Spectre II and Doctor Manhattan all agree to keep quiet about the true nature of the events when the United States surprisingly does enter into a peace accord with the Soviet Union.

Rorschach states the others must be joking, and leaves to tell the world. Dr. Manhattan confronts him outside, telling him he cannot allow Rorschach to reveal the truth. Refusing to compromise his principles, Rorschach understands he will be killed. He removes his mask and demands that Manhattan just "do it", which he does.

In the final scenes of the comic, Rorschach's journal has made it to the offices of the New Frontiersman, a right-wing newspaper. Outraged by the new accord between the Soviet Union and the United States, the editor pulls a planned two-page story. He leaves it to his assistant Seymour to decide how to fill that space, and Seymour begins to reach for the paper's "Crank File," which contains the journal. The outcome is ambiguous.

=== Events of Doomsday Clock ===
A new character takes on the name of Rorschach in the 2017 series Doomsday Clock by Geoff Johns and Gary Frank. The events of Doomsday Clock begin with Robert Redford winning the 1992 election by using the details of Kovacs' journal, which he gained from the New Frontiersman, leading the citizens of New York to rally against Ozymandias, while the United States faces an inevitable nuclear war. Reggie Long, son of Kovacs's prison psychologist Dr. Malcolm Long, later takes on the Rorschach mantle after being driven insane by Veidt's monster and learning self-defense techniques from former Mothman Byron Lewis, and mistakenly believing that his father and Rorschach had been friends after reading parts of his reports on him. The identity of this new Rorscach is not revealed until issue four.

=== Events of Rorschach ===
Thirty-five years after the death of Rorschach, right-wing vigilante Laura "The Kid" Cummings brainwashes two elderly comic book creators, Wil Myerson and Frank Miller, into believing that they are Rorschach's reincarnation, before attempting to assassinate Robert Redford's political opponent, Gavin Turley. After Cummings and Myerson are killed during their failed assassination attempt, an unnamed detective investigates their work, and ends up killing Turley himself. The detective is implied to have also been brainwashed into believing he has become a vessel for Rorshach's soul.

== Characterization ==
Walter Kovacs, Rorschach's "disguise" (Left); and the inkblot mask, Rorschach's "true face" (Right)

=== Appearance ===
Rorschach is 5'6" tall and weighs 140 pounds, and, as Walter Kovacs (his "disguise"), he appears as a red-haired, expressionless man who always carries with him a sign that reads "THE END IS NIGH". Most people who see Kovacs consider him ugly and Rorschach himself states that he cannot bear to look upon his own human face, considering his mask (or true "face") to be beautiful instead. His clothing then matches those of a homeless man, which seems to be his disguise when he has not donned his vigilante attire.

During Rorschach's nighttime patrols, he wears a striped purple business suit, similarly colored leather gloves, a grayed scarf, and heavily unpolished elevator shoes. More signature of his apparel is his brown trench coat with his matching fedora hat that has a light purple stripe. However, Rorschach's most defining feature of his costume is his ink-blotted mask.

Rorschach's mask, which he considers his true "face", is a piece of fabric made from a material derived from the technologies of Dr. Manhattan, and it is blank except on the front, where two viscous liquids, one black and one white, are between two layers of latex. The liquids continually shift in response to heat and pressure, which explains why the liquid only animates when Rorschach puts it on his face. The black liquids form symmetrical patterns like those of a Rorschach inkblot test while never mixing with the white color of the mask, thus never producing a gray color, much like Rorschach's view of morality and the world.

=== Personality ===
During his childhood, Walter Kovacs was described as bright, and excelled in literature, mathematics, political science, and religious education. Kovacs continues a one-man battle against crime long after superheroes have become both detested and illegal, eventually replacing his Kovacs identity with the persona of Rorschach. Rorschach considers his mask his true "face" and his unmasked persona to be his "disguise", refusing to answer to his birth name during his trial and psychiatric sessions. Moore depicted Rorschach as being extremely right-wing, and morally absolute, a viewpoint that has alienated him from the rest of society, even among other superheroes. Rorschach presents his views on right and wrong as starkly black and white with no room for compromise, with the exception of his respect for the Comedian, whose attempted rape of the first Silk Spectre he dismisses as a "moral lapse". He holds deep contempt for behavior he considers immoral and is openly derogatory toward heroes who do not share his unwavering views, deriding them as "soft".

Rorschach displays a discomfort with female sexuality as a result of his early childhood trauma, although the crimes that most affected him spiritually were against women: the murders of Kitty Genovese and Blair Roche. Rorschach is often described as being mentally ill by other characters in the comic.

=== Skills and abilities ===
Like most characters in Watchmen, Rorschach has no obvious "superpowers". He merely has his strong will, peak-human physical strength, and finely-honed sense of timing and precision. Rorschach is very resourceful and creative, adapting ordinary household objects into tools or weapons, such as the use of a can of aerosol spray in combination with multiple matches to set fire to a police officer and throwing ground black pepper to blind another police officer, during a confrontation at Moloch's house. During the series he is shown to use cooking fat, a toilet bowl, a cigarette, a fork and his jacket all as weapons; he is also shown using a coat hanger as a makeshift measuring device. He owns a gas-powered grappling gun, which he uses to climb buildings (and once as a makeshift harpoon gun against a police officer), as seen in Chapter One, which was designed and built by Nite Owl II.

Rorschach is well versed in street combat, gymnastics, and boxing. He is also extremely stoic, as shown by his indifference to pain and discomfort. He even tolerated Antarctic temperatures while wearing only a trenchcoat over street clothes, without complaining or even commenting on the severe cold.

Despite his mental instability, Rorschach is extremely intelligent and was described as "tactically brilliant and unpredictable" by Nite Owl, and shows a marked affinity for detective work, as evidenced by his ability to locate the Comedian's costume in his apartment when the police could not. Much like Batman in the mainstream DC Universe, Rorschach is given the title of "World's Greatest Detective."

He is also skilled at lock picking (although a running gag throughout the series has him simply forcing open Nite Owl's front door to talk to him).

== Reception ==
The character of Rorschach has been received with critical acclaim by critics, reviewers, and readers; he has also been awarded. In 1988, the character won the "Character Most Worthy of Own Title" category in the American Section of the Eagle Awards for comics released during 1987. Rorschach has been labelled the "obvious fan favorite" and the "flagship" character of Watchmen, and is often regarded as the most iconic and popular character of the series. The misanthropic character's popularity has led author Alan Moore to proclaim Watchmen's failure as literature.

Rorschach was named the 6th-greatest comic book character of all time by Wizard magazine in May 2008, with the magazine stating that "Rorschach still stands as one of the most compelling and frightening characters in comics' history." In July 2008, he was ranked as the 16th "Greatest Comic Book Character" by Empire magazine, which, when picking their top Watchmen character, proclaimed "from a purely iconic point of view, it had to be Rorschach" and described him as "taut, tortured, complex creation who, as well as being at the centre of some of Watchmen's most memorable sequences [...], ends up being perhaps the most pure out of the graphic novel's characters." TopTenz placed Rorschach 3rd on their 2010 list of the "Top 10 Comic Book Anti-Heroes (Marvel & DC)" where he was described as "just one of many outstanding characters introduced during the landmark Watchmen series, but he is far and away the most popular and fascinating." In 2011, IGN ranked the character 16th on their "Top 100 Comic Book Heroes" list, noting that "One has to admire his determination, if not necessarily his methods." Rorschach's friendship with Nite Owl II was listed 10th on Fandomania's 2009 "Top 10 Sci-Fi/Fantasy Friendships" list, which commented that "even though they have contrasting world views, they have the same belief towards crime: it must be fought against."

In the making of the film adaptation, director Zack Snyder said "no character" was more important than Rorschach. The Los Angeles Times further added on Snyder's statement, claiming "The filmmaker said [Rorschach] 'is easily one of the greatest comic book characters ever' and that's a view shared by many fans and the press that serves them." When asked what he thought of the character, Jackie Earle Haley responded that Rorschach was "an awesome character. He is one twisted, sick individual but he's still a fascinating character."

Haley's performance as Rorschach in the Watchmen film has been acclaimed. Empire magazine remarked that the portrayals of Rorschach, along with Nite Owl, were the most successful and commented that Haley's performance would make the audience "half-wish Snyder might have stuck with Rorschach as [the sole] protagonist rather than spreading the net so wide." IGN praised Haley's performance, despite his face being obscured for most of the film, as one of the film's key highlights, proclaiming that "Haley IS Rorschach. It's not just a career-defining performance, it's one of the best this genre has seen other than Heath Ledger's Joker. He owns the screen whenever he's on it." Richard Corliss of Time praised Haley, "who does right by his grizzled role" and named him and Jeffrey Dean Morgan (The Comedian) as the standout actors of the film.

== Other versions ==
Rorschach has been referred to, quoted, and parodied several times in various media. These include:

- In Kingdom Come #2, a miniseries published by DC Comics in 1996, Rorschach appears as a background character breaking Brother Power's fingers. He is also seen standing between the Question and Obsidian, during a scene in which Superman visits a metahuman bar.
- In 2007, Rorschach was featured in the promo artwork by Art Adams for the Countdown to Final Crisis: Arena miniseries by DC Comics, where he is being beaten by Batman from Frank Miller's The Dark Knight Returns. However, DC opted to omit Rorschach and the aforementioned Batman from the actual Countdown to the Final Crisis: Arena miniseries.

== In other media ==
=== Television ===
- Rorschach appears in Watchmen: Motion Comic, where he, along with every other character in the series, is voiced by actor Tom Stechschulte.
- In Watchmen (2019), after Rorschach's mysterious disappearance (in reality his death, as depicted at the end of the graphic novel), his journal was discovered. Published in a reactionary newspaper known for conspiracy theories, it was initially ignored. However, the journal was later appropriated by the "Seventh Kavalry", a white supremacist splinter terrorist group, who, given Rorschach's right-wing politics and description of morality as "black-and-white", misinterpreted it as a racist manifesto. Members of the Kavalry wear crude replicas of Rorschach's mask and attack members of the Tulsa police and their families for enforcing President Robert Redford's reparations to victims of racial injustices, and intend to acquire the powers of Doctor Manhattan for themselves and their masters, the secret white supremacist order "Cyclops" led by Senator Joseph Keene, Jr.

=== Film ===
Jackie Earle Haley as Rorschach in the film Watchmen

- Rorschach appears in Watchmen (2009), portrayed by Jackie Earle Haley, with Eli Snyder, the son of the film's director Zack Snyder, playing the young Rorschach in flashbacks. While Rorschach in the film adaptation is relatively faithful to his graphic novel counterpart, there are still some differences in description and storyline. Rorschach's age in the film is 35, whereas in the graphic novel he is 45 years old (although this was most likely an error in production as his certificate marks him as forty-five). He is depicted in the film as being right-handed (justified by Jackie Earle Haley being right-handed) as opposed to left-handed. In the graphic novel, Rorschach consistently talks in a thudding pidgin while this is toned down in the film, with Rorschach talking in a more growling manner. His psychological instability in the film is downplayed, and he appears to be stronger than his graphic novel-self as he manages to ward off some attacking policemen, even after falling from an apartment window. He is also shown to openly disapprove of Nite Owl and Silk Spectre's relationship. In the film, rather than Rorschach, Nite Owl II is the one who warns Ozymandias of the possible mask-killer, although Rorschach was revealed to have visited him earlier. Rorschach's method of killing Grice differs also. In the film he uses the meat cleaver that killed Blair Roche to continuously hack the kidnapper, uttering after killing Grice, "Men get arrested. Dogs get put down!". The number of times Rorschach visits the criminal underworld, Nite Owl and Moloch are reduced, and some of these scenes are also altered. Rorschach's landlady, and anything concerning his apartment are left out; when obtaining his costume after the prison break, instead of wearing a spare one in his apartment, he regains his previous one in the prison. While Rorschach's meeting with Dr. Malcolm Long is shown, this has been reduced to one meeting; also, Long's dark subplot where Rorschach's story affects his personal life and philosophy are omitted. Snyder admitted that while he did not film the scene he "would have loved to." Rorschach's confrontation with Dr. Manhattan is extended. Unlike in the novel, Nite Owl is present for Rorschach's death, becoming enraged at Ozymandias after witnessing the spectacle. Snyder felt he "needed a moment at the end" and explained that he changed this scene because he wanted to show a glimpse of the "sweet" relationship between Rorschach and Nite Owl that was established in the film.
- Rorschach appears in the animated film Watchmen (2024), voiced by Titus Welliver.

=== Video games ===
- Rorschach appears as a playable character in Watchmen: The End Is Nigh, with Jackie Earle Haley reprising his role.

== In popular culture ==
- In The Question #17 published by DC Comics in 1988, the Question, on whom Rorschach was partly based, actually read a copy of the Watchmen trade paperback. Question is briefly inspired by the comic and the character of Rorschach, leading him to take a more physically aggressive style of crime fighting. At the end of the issue, having been overpowered in hand-to-hand combat by a pair of villains, he is asked if he has any final words, and Question remarks, "Rorschach sucks." Rorschach is also featured in a dream sequence experienced by the Question in that issue.
- In Deadpool: Sins of the Past #4, a miniseries published by Marvel Comics in 1994, Deadpool's mask is forcibly removed by the Juggernaut, at which point Deadpool parrots Rorschach by screaming, "My face! Give me back my face!".
- In Astonishing X-Men vol. 3 #6 published by Marvel Comics in 2004, Rorschach makes another appearance in one of the riot scenes, running across the panel.
- In the 2009 one-shot comic Watchmensch released by Brain Scan Studios which parodies the Watchmen series, Rorschach is depicted as a lawyer who is known instead as "Spottyman" and is pretending to be Jewish.
- In Uncanny X-Men #525 published by Marvel Comics in 2010, during the "Second Coming" storyline, Fantomex, while fighting a group of Nimrods from the future, imitates Rorschach's line from when he was in prison: "I'm not trapped in here with you... You're trapped in here with me" and then adds "That film was stupid."
- During the Marvel storyline "Spider-Verse" when the Master Weaver shows the web of life to Solus, Morlun's father, to show where Morlun is, various Spider-men are seen, one of them dressed like Rorschach but with red instead of white and with the black spots as eyes with smaller spots around them.
- The character Pastry Face II is used to represent Rorshach in the Simpsons Comics Spectacular #13 storyline "Who Splotches the Splotchmen?"
- In The Simpsons 2007 episode "Husbands and Knives", infant versions of Rorschach along with Ozymandias, Dr. Manhattan, and Nite Owl II are shown riding a surfboard on the cover of a DVD of the fictional film Watchmen Babies in V for Vacation (a parody of Alan Moore's graphic novels Watchmen and V for Vendetta).
- The Question, as voiced by Jeffrey Combs in Justice League Unlimited, mimics Rorschach's speaking patterns and monotone voice and his reputation for being crazy by the other heroes. In the episode "Question Authority," after being beaten and tortured by Lex Luthor, the Question is rescued and unmasked, where it is revealed the ordeal has given him bruises resembling Kovacs' after his arrest; the Question additionally holds a sign reading "The End is Nigh", identical to the sign Kovacs is seen holding throughout the graphic novel.
- Rorschach, along with the other main characters of the graphic novel, are shown in Saturday Morning Watchmen, a 2009 Newgrounds and YouTube viral video which parodies the Watchmen series. In the video, Rorschach appears as a "nutty" character who usually is "clowning around". He is also a "friend to the animals", and is shown petting a pair of German Shepherds, in ironic contrast to the graphic novel.
- In the first episode of the second season of Scooby-Doo! Mystery Incorporated, Velma is dressed in an overcoat and fedora and asks Fred, "Who were you expecting, Rorschach?"
- Rorschach was briefly portrayed in the documentary The Mindscape of Alan Moore, where he is voiced by Alan Moore himself.
- In the Japanese manga Attack on Titan, the character Levi Ackerman was inspired by Rorschach, according to the series creator Hajime Isayama. In the same manga, the character Erwin Smith is inspired by Ozymandias, another character from Watchmen.
- Rorschach appears in Laura Beatty's 2019 novel, Lost Property.

== See also ==
- List of DC Comics characters
- List of fictional antiheroes
