= Community care =

Community care may refer to:

- Care in the Community
- Community health centers in the United States
- Community Care, a magazine and website for the industry
- Home care, called community care in Ontario, Canada.
