= Neil Griffiths =

Neil Griffiths may refer to:

- Neil Griffiths (novelist), British novelist
- Neil Griffiths (footballer) (born 1951), former English footballer
