= Kolymsky Heights =

1994 thriller novel by Lionel Davidson

- First edition
- Author: Lionel Davidson
- Language: English
- Genre: Thriller novel
- Publisher: Heinemann (UK); St. Martin's Press (US)
- Publication date: 1994
- Publication place: Great Britain
- Media type: Print (Hardcover & Paperback)
- Pages: 315 pp
- ISBN: 0-312-95661-4
- OCLC: 33253876

Kolymsky Heights is a 1994 thriller novel by Lionel Davidson. It was his first thriller novel in 16 years, following The Chelsea Murders.

== Plot summary ==
A coded message is smuggled out of Russia, a plea for help from the director of a super-secret laboratory deep in the frozen wastes of Siberia. The note is addressed to Johnny Porter, a Canadian Indian of the Gitxsan tribe with a genius for languages. The CIA recruits Porter, who infiltrates Russia, first posing as a Korean sailor on a tramp freighter, then as a Chukchi driver called Khodyan. Working at a transport company, he befriends an employee who gives him sufficient spare parts to build a bobik truck, which he assembles in a cave. Porter also befriends the local doctor, Tanya Komarova, who is also working for the CIA, and they become lovers. With her help, he infiltrates the research facility by switching places with an Evenk employee. The director, Ephraim Rogachev, reveals to Porter the research they have been conducting, including a cure for blindness which the Soviets are concealing because of the military applications of the technology.

The Russian security services become aware that "Khodyan" is not who he says he is, and begin to pursue him. Porter escapes, first in the bobik, then by stealing a plane ticket, a snow-plough, and finally on skis. He makes his way to the Bering Strait where the Soviets finally catch up with him. He escapes to America, but suffers severe wounds including the loss of an eye.

The Americans fake his death, and he sends a message to Komarova to join him.

== Reception ==
Publishers Weekly described it as "shameless, wonderful, riveting entertainment". The New York Times described it as "an icy marvel of invention". A review in The Guardian described it as "a masterpiece of suspense".

Philip Pullman has stated that Kolymsky Heights is "the best thriller I've ever read, and I've read plenty. A solidly researched and bone-chilling adventure in a savage setting, with a superb hero."

In 2017, the book was chosen by Toby Young to discuss on BBC Radio 4's A Good Read. Sarah Vine said "what I loved about it is the fact that it has all the elements of a really really good thriller, which is that: the plot is completely insane; the hero is totally implausible, he's a genius, he speaks 27 different languages, every woman he meets wants to have sex with him. Quite a lot of the book features him building an entire car from scratch using only spare parts... He makes James Bond look like a bit of a slacker."

In 2019, the book was optioned to be adapted into a movie.

Kolymsky Heights was a finalist for the 1995 Anthony Award for Best Novel.
