= Marsha Hunt =

Marsha Hunt may refer to:

- Marsha Hunt (actress, born 1917) (1917–2022), American film, theatre and television actress
- Marsha Hunt (actress, born 1946) (born 1946), American singer, novelist, actress and model
