= Yinka Sunmonu =

British writer and journalist (born 1962)

- Born: 1962 (age 63–64); London, England
- Education: Goldsmiths' College
- Occupations: Writer and journalist

Yinka Sunmonu (born 1962) is a British writer and journalist.

== Life ==
Yinka Sunmonu was born in 1962 in London. She gained a BA degree in English, African and Caribbean Studies and a MA in creative and life writing from Goldsmiths' College.

Sunmonu contributed a story to the 1999 anthology Afrobeat: New Black British Fiction. Her first novel, Cherish, followed the conflicts of a Nigerian girl privately fostered by a white family.

An expert on adoption and fostering in the black community, Sunmonu has also written on dementia care in the black community. She has written for Aspire Magazine, West Africa, Community Care, Woman to Woman, The Voice, Foster Care and Adoption & Fostering.

== Works ==
- "Why black carers are deterred from adoption". Adoption & Fostering, Vol. 24, Issue 1 (April 2000), pp. 59–60.
- Cherish. London: Mango Publishing, 2003.
