= Marsha Hunt (actress, born 1946) =

American singer, novelist, actress and model

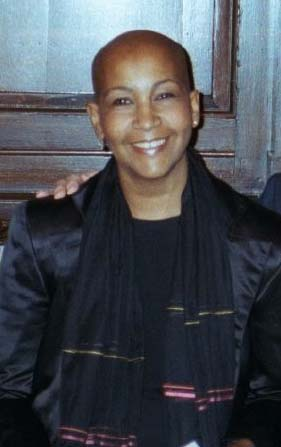
- Hunt in 2005
- Born: April 15, 1946 (age 80); Philadelphia, Pennsylvania, U.S.
- Education: University of California, Berkeley
- Occupations: Actress; singer; novelist; model
- Years active: 1967–present
- Spouse: Mike Ratledge (m. 1967; died 2025)
- Children: 1
- Musical career
- Genres: Rock; soul; pop
- Instrument: Vocals

Marsha Hunt (born April 15, 1946) is an American actress, novelist, singer and former model, who has lived mostly in Britain and Ireland. She achieved national fame when she appeared in London as Dionne in the long-running rock musical Hair. She had relationships with Marc Bolan and Mick Jagger, who is the father of her only child, Karis Jagger.

Hunt has written three novels and three autobiographies, which include a frank account of life as a breast cancer sufferer.

== Early life ==
Hunt was born in Philadelphia in 1946 and lived in North Philadelphia, near 23rd and Columbia, then in Germantown and Mount Airy, for the first 13 years of her life. Hunt told The Philadelphia Inquirer that she remembers Philadelphia with affection, particularly the "Philadelphia steak sandwiches and the bad boys on the basketball court".

Hunt's mother, Inez, was her primary parent and worked as a librarian in a local library. Hunt's father, Blaire Theodore Hunt Jr., was one of America's first Black psychiatrists but he did not live with Hunt; when she was 15 years old, she found out that he had taken his own life three years previously. Hunt was brought up by her mother, her aunt, and her grandmother. Hunt described her mother as "extremely intelligent and education-minded", her aunt as "extremely Catholic but very glamorous", and her grandmother as an "extremely aggressive...ass-kicking" independent Southern woman.

Hunt credits the experience of having been poor with teaching her not to be materialistic. Her family put a great deal of emphasis on academic performance, and Hunt did very well in school. In 1960, the family moved to Kensington, California, which Hunt still regards as home, so that her brother and sister could attend Oakland High School and prepare to attend the University of California, Berkeley. Hunt also went to Berkeley, in 1964, where she joined Jerry Rubin on protest marches against the Vietnam War. In her book Undefeated she recalled that during her time at Berkeley they "were sitting in for the Free Speech Movement, smoking pot, experimenting with acid, lining up to take Oriental philosophy courses, daring to co-habit, and going to dances in San Francisco."

== Move to London ==
In February 1966, Hunt booked a flight for a brief trip to London, where she was temporarily detained before a fellow detainee gave her details of contacts, including John Shepherd, who worked on the television show Ready Steady Go!. Through Shepherd, she met Kenny Lynch, and then appeared as an extra in Michelangelo Antonioni's film Blow-Up. Hunt has said that in London in the 1960s "anything seemed possible."

She briefly lived in Edinburgh, Scotland, before returning to London where she became a backing singer with Alexis Korner's trio Free at Last. She then met and began a short relationship with musician John Mayall, inspiring Mayall's songs "Marsha's Mood" and "Brown Sugar", which were included on his 1967 album, The Blues Alone. Although Hunt indicates that she had no great musical talent, she worked as a singer for 18 months after arriving in England, intending to earn her fare back home.

=== Marriage to Mike Ratledge ===
In late 1966, Hunt met Mike Ratledge of Soft Machine. Hunt was having trouble getting a visa extension to stay in England and proposed to Ratledge. Ratledge and Hunt were married on April 15, 1967. The Soft Machine were heavily booked and there was no time for a honeymoon, but Ratledge and Hunt spent two months together before the band headed for France later that year. Hunt said in 1991 that she and Ratledge never held hands and never kissed, though "...he comes for Easter. But that's what we called 'married'." While the two have remained good friends, Hunt says the secret to a happy marriage is to "separate immediately." On their 40th wedding anniversary, Hunt called Ratledge up and jokingly said, "We should renew our vows." Ratledge died on 5 February 2025.

=== Music career ===
After her marriage in 1967, Hunt took a singing job with Long John Baldry's band Bluesology, alongside keyboard player Reg Dwight, soon to be known as Elton John. She also auditioned for Ratledge's band Soft Machine, and in 1968, briefly joined the group The Ferris Wheel.

That same year, Hunt achieved national fame in England when she appeared as Dionne in the rock musical Hair, a box-office smash on the London stage. Hunt only had two lines of dialogue in Hair, but she attracted a lot of media attention and her photo appeared in many newspapers and magazines. Her photograph was used on the poster and playbill of the original London production, photographed by Justin de Villeneuve. Her 1968 photo also replaced the original LP artwork when Reader's Digest re-issued the LP in Europe in 1976. Hunt says that the role was a perfect fit for her and expressed who she actually was. She was one of three Americans featured in the London show, and when the show began she had no contract to perform. Once the show opened, she was featured in so many stories that she was offered a contract right away.

Hunt played at the Jazz Bilzen and Isle of Wight music festivals in August 1969 with her backup band "White Trash". Hunt's first single, a cover of Dr John's "Walk on Gilded Splinters", produced by Tony Visconti, was released on Track Records in 1969; it became a minor hit. An album, Woman Child (also produced by Tony Visconti) (in Germany released under the title Desdemona), followed in 1971. In May 1977, an album with disco songs was released in Germany with the title Marsha. It was recorded at Musicland Studios in Munich and produced by Pete Belotte (co-producer with Giorgio Moroder of many Donna Summer albums).

Hunt met Marc Bolan in 1969 when she went to the studio where Bolan's group was recording "Unicorn". Tony Visconti said that when Bolan and Hunt met, "[y]ou could see the shafts of light pouring out of their eyes into each other.... We finished the session unusually early, and Marc and Marsha walked out into the night hand in hand." According to Hunt, the relationship between the two was based on more than physical attraction, though she also recalled that her commercial visibility put her in opposition to Bolan's philosophy that "the serious art of music...was validated by obscurity."

In 1971, after the birth of her daughter Karis, whose father was Mick Jagger, she appeared for a while in the musical Catch My Soul, and acted alongside Peter Cushing and Christopher Lee in the film Dracula A.D. 1972. She signed a recording contract with Phonogram Records, and led her own band, 22, which the record company insisted on billing as "Marsha Hunt's 22". The band included guitarist Hugh Burns, whom Hunt lived with for three years. The band toured, released two singles, "Medusa" and "(Oh No! Not) The Beast Day", and recorded a set of demos of songs largely written by Hunt. These were later released in Germany and Poland as an album, Attention! Marsha Hunt, though Hunt was unaware of its release until 2020. The band 22 split up after they had their equipment stolen and Hunt's daughter became ill.

From 1973, Hunt co-presented with Sarah Ward a popular late-night radio show, Sarah. Marsha and Friends, on London's Capital Radio. Also in 1973, as a member of a panel organised by British magazine Melody Maker to discuss women in music and options open to Black women, Hunt suggested that Black women needed to make use of the "side-door" in the industry, entering as "the statutory representative" before they could make music under their own terms.

In 1976, she released two funk-pop singles produced by Steve Rowland, and the following year issued an album, Marsha, produced by Pete Bellotte, which she later described as "a musical departure that had nothing to do with my own taste". She moved to Los Angeles in the late 1970s, and fronted a punk rock-influenced band, Marsha & The Vendettas. From there, she moved to Australia, and recorded a single, "Pleasure Zone", written with David Dundas and produced by Ricky Fataar.

=== Modelling ===
Three months after Hair opened, Hunt was on the cover of British high-fashion magazine Queen, the first Black model to appear on their cover. In 1968, Hunt posed nude for photographer Patrick Lichfield after the opening night for Hair and the photo appeared on the cover of British Vogue's January 1969 issue. Almost 40 years later, Hunt again posed nude for Lichfield, recreating the pose for her Vogue cover five weeks after she had had her right breast and lymph glands removed to halt the spread of cancer. The photo appeared on the cover of her 2005 book Undefeated, about her battle with cancer. She was pleased to work with the photographer under such differing circumstances, although in her autobiography she expressed confusion as to why the photo has been so often reprinted. Hunt has also been photographed by Lewis Morley and Horace Ové.

=== Relationship with Mick Jagger ===
Hunt said that she met Mick Jagger in 1969 when the Rolling Stones asked her to pose for an ad for "Honky Tonk Women", which she refused to do because she "didn't want to look like [she'd] just been had by all the Rolling Stones." Jagger called her later, and their nine or 10-month affair began. According to Christopher Sandford's book Mick Jagger: Rebel Knight, Hunt told journalist Frankie McGowan that Jagger's shyness and awkwardness won her over, but that their relationship was conducted mostly in private because their social scenes were very different. According to Tony Sanchez in Up and Down with the Rolling Stones, Jagger considered proposing to Hunt but did not because he did not think he loved Hunt enough to spend the rest of his life with her, while Hunt, for her part, did not think they were sufficiently compatible to co-habit satisfactorily. The relationship ended in June 1970, when Hunt was pregnant with Jagger's first child, Karis. According to Hunt, the pair planned the child but never intended to live together and the two agreed that Jagger would be an "absent father". On 4 November 1970, Karis was born in London. She is Hunt's only child.

In 1973, when Karis was two years old, Hunt asked the courts in London for an affiliation order against Jagger and eventually settled out of court. Jagger called the suit "silly". He agreed to set up a trust fund for Karis until she reached age 21, but he was allowed to deny his paternity on record. In 1978, Hunt filed a paternity suit in Los Angeles asking for $580 a week. At the time, Hunt was unemployed and received welfare payments from Aid to Dependent Children. In 1979, Hunt won the paternity suit, saying she wanted "only to be able to say to my daughter, when she's 21, that I didn't allow her father to neglect his responsibilities". Jagger grew closer to Karis when she was 11 years old, legally, financially, and personally. He paid for her education at a private secondary school and at Yale University and employed her in the Rolling Stones' infrastructure as a researcher on the 25×5: the Continuing Adventures of the Rolling Stones documentary. Jagger took her on holiday with his family when she was a teenager, attended her Yale University graduation and her 2000 wedding, and he was at the hospital for the birth of her son in 2004. In 1991, Hunt indicated that she left the door open for Jagger to come back to his child and admired the fact that he did. In December 2012, Hunt sold a series of love letters written to her in the summer of 1969 by Mick Jagger. The letters were sold by Sotheby's of London for £182,250 ($301,000).

=== "Brown Sugar" ===
Christopher Sandford writes in his book Mick Jagger that when the Rolling Stones released the song "Brown Sugar" there was immediate speculation that it referred to Hunt or to soul singer Claudia Lennear. In her autobiography, Real Life (1985), Hunt acknowledged that "Brown Sugar" and a few other songs are about her, which she reiterated in her book Undefeated (2006). When Hunt was asked for an interview with the Irish Times in 2008 how she felt about the song, she said: "it doesn't make me feel any way at all." However, Rolling Stones' bassist Bill Wyman stated in his book, Rolling With The Stones (2002), that the lyrics were partially inspired by Lennear. In 2014, Lennear told The Times that the song is about her because she was dating Jagger when he wrote it. Hunt was also the titular dedicatee Marsha in Robert Wyatt's song "To Carla, Marsha and Caroline (For Making Everything Beautifuller)" from his album The End of an Ear.

== Writing ==
=== Autobiography ===
Hunt began writing in 1985, and her first book was her autobiography, Real Life: The Story of a Survivor (1986). In 1996, she published her second autobiography, Repossessing Ernestine: A Granddaughter Uncovers the Secret History of Her American Family, about her search for her paternal grandmother who was placed in an asylum for nearly 50 years. In 2005, Hunt released her memoir about her battle with cancer, Undefeated.

=== Novelist ===
In 1990, Hunt published her first novel, Joy, about a woman who grew up to join a singing group reminiscent of The Supremes before dying an early death. She wrote Joy while touring England with a group performing Othello. Hunt's second novel, Free, published in 1992, tells the story of freed slaves and their children living in Germantown, Pennsylvania, in 1913. Her novel Like Venus Fading (1998) is inspired by the lives of Adelaide Hall, known as the "lightly-tanned Venus", Josephine Baker and Dorothy Dandridge.

Hunt wrote her first four books whilst living in isolation in a remote hideaway in France called La montagne.

=== Editor ===
In 1999, Hunt sought a job of writer-in-residence at Dublin's Mountjoy Prison and later collected selected writings from the prisoners and edited The Junk Yard: Voices From An Irish Prison. The book contains 15 stories divided into five sections: Childhood, Family Life, The Score, Criminal Life and Prison Life. It became a number-one bestseller in Ireland in 1999.

=== Activist ===
In 1995, Hunt set up the Saga Prize, to discover new British-born black literary talent and recognise the literature emerging from indigenous black Britons' experiences. Awarded to "the best unpublished novel by a writer born in Great Britain or The Republic of Ireland having a black African ancestor", the prize, while attracting criticism from the Commission for Racial Equality, ran for four years until 1998. Winners including Diran Adebayo and Joanna Traynor.

During the 1997 Edinburgh International Book Festival, Hunt staged a one-woman protest, picketing Charlotte Square about the "shoddy administration" of the festival. The director of the festival was fired in the aftermath of her protest.

=== Other projects ===
In 2005, Hunt stated that she was writing a book about Jimi Hendrix that she considers her life work. She indicated that no one alive can share her perspective on the matter, "because he and I shared something – black Americans who came to London were transformed and repackaged for the U.S., although I never became successful there and he did."

== Acting ==
=== Theatre ===
In 1971, Hunt played Bianca in Catch My Soul, the rock-and-roll stage version of Othello produced by Jack Good. In 1973, she wrote, produced, and directed a new London show entitled Man to Woman. The music from the show was released on vinyl in 1982 by Virgin Records, featuring vocals by Robert Wyatt. In 1975, Hunt appeared as Sabina in The Skin of Our Teeth. In 1991, Hunt appeared as Nurse Logan in the world premiere of Arthur Miller's The Ride Down Mount Morgan at London's Wyndham's Theatre. Hunt became a member of the National Theatre and the Royal Shakespeare Company.

In 1994, Hunt performed a one-woman play in Scotland at the Edinburgh Festival playing Baby Palatine, a 60-year-old woman who becomes the wardrobe mistress to a female pop group. The play is based on Hunt's 1990 novel, Joy, and was directed by Hunt's daughter, Karis Jagger.

=== Film ===
Hunt's film career included appearances in Dracula A.D. 1972 (1972), Britannia Hospital (1982) directed by Lindsay Anderson, The Sender (1982), Never Say Never Again (1983), Howling II: Your Sister Is a Werewolf (1985), and Tank Malling (1989).

=== Television ===
In 1988, Hunt played Elvi Rogers in The Play on One: Unreported Incident. In 1990, Hunt played Bianca in the BBC television production of Othello directed by Trevor Nunn.

=== Documentaries ===
In 1997, Irish documentary filmmaker Alan Gilsenan made God Bless America, featuring six American cities seen through the eyes of six American authors. Hunt's participation resulted in Marsha Hunt's Philadelphia. According to Gilsenan, Hunt attributes the success of American democracy and capitalism to the crime of slavery, which must be understood if America is to have peace. Hunt fell in love with Gilsenan and moved to the Wicklow mountains near Dublin with him, where in 1999 she helped him fight colon cancer, drawing on her own experiences with the disease. As of 2008, Hunt and Gilsenan were no longer in a relationship.

Hunt was the subject of an ITV documentary, Beating Breast Cancer, which was broadcast on September 26, 2005.

== Cancer ==
In late 2004, Hunt was diagnosed with breast cancer and was told to have surgery to remove her right breast and her lymph nodes. Hunt postponed seeking treatment for five months, which resulted in facing third stage cancer. She chose to have surgery in Ireland and had a complete mastectomy with no following reconstruction. After the operation, Hunt said she did not mourn the loss of her breast, but felt happy that the cancer had been removed. She later described the scar from surgery as a memento of what she survived, and also compared herself to an Amazon warrior.

After her mastectomy, she contracted the superbug MRSA and had to be treated with Zyvox. She also had chemotherapy.

The Irish Independent reported on August 27, 2008, that Hunt stood on a table at the opening of the Mater Private Hospital in Dublin to let everyone see that she had survived third-stage breast cancer after a treatment of chemotherapy, radiation, and Herceptin therapy at the hospital.

== Personal life ==
In 2008, Hunt stated that the biggest misconception people have about her is that she is wealthy, though she describes herself as "rich in spirit". She believes that wealth is not necessary for happiness and claimed to have lived the "writing life" for the past two decades. She enjoys the solitude of living on her own and the freedom of being single. Hunt has lived in Ireland since 1995. She also owns a home in the French countryside about 60 miles from Paris.

=== Self-identity ===
When Hunt came to live in Europe she found that people there called her an American, not an African American or Black. She herself describes her skin colour as "oak with a hint of maple", and notes that "[o]f the various races I know I comprise—African, American Indian, German Jew and Irish—only the African was acknowledged." Hunt invented her own word to describe herself, based on the French word melange (mixture) and the word melanin: Melangian.

In 1991, Hunt stated that the Black community inflicts pain on itself, and also said that living overseas for most of her life has made her a foreigner in the US. She said, "I'm scared to walk through Harlem... more scared than you, because if I walked through Harlem with the weird shoes and the weird accent, I'd get my butt kicked faster than you. In a way, I'm the betrayer."

Hunt is featured in the National Museum of African American History and Culture, a Smithsonian Institution museum in Washington D.C., which opened in 2016 at a ceremony led by then-President Barack Obama.
