= Hot Enough for June =

- Original film poster by Renato Fratini
- Directed by: Ralph Thomas
- Screenplay by: Lukas Heller
- Based on: The Night of Wenceslas by Lionel Davidson
- Produced by: Betty E. Box
- Starring: Dirk Bogarde; Sylva Koscina; Robert Morley; Leo McKern
- Cinematography: Ernest Steward
- Edited by: Alfred Roome
- Music by: Angelo Lavagnino
- Production company: Rank Organisation
- Distributed by: Rank Film Distributors
- Release date: 10 March 1964
- Running time: 98 minutes
- Country: United Kingdom

Hot Enough for June is a 1964 British spy comedy film directed by Ralph Thomas, and starring Dirk Bogarde with Sylva Koscina in her English film debut, Robert Morley and Leo McKern. It was written by Lukas Heller based on the 1960 novel The Night of Wenceslas by Lionel Davidson. The film was cut by twenty minutes and retitled Agent 8 3/4 for the US release by the American distributor Continental Distributing.

== Plot ==
Secret Service employee Roger Allsop turns over some belongings to a clerk, who stows them in a drawer marked 007 before turning the identifying card over to read "deceased". Allsop and his superior, Colonel Cunliffe, then discuss the necessity to send someone to pick up an item from behind the Iron Curtain.

Unemployed writer Nicholas Whistler is sent by the employment exchange to be interviewed by Cunliffe, supposedly for a job as a trainee executive for a glass company. Cunliffe discovers Whistler speaks Czech, and offers him an exorbitant salary, plus expenses.

Whistler is given puzzling instructions to meet someone who will respond to the coded remark "Hot Enough For June", before being sent to Prague on a "business" trip later the same day. On his arrival, he is assigned a beautiful driver and guide, Vlasta. She drives him to inspect a glass factory, where the washroom attendant responds to the code.

That night he takes Vlasta to dinner. Unbeknownst to him, she is an agent of the Czech secret police who know (although he does not realise it himself yet) that he is actually working for British intelligence. He and Vlasta are attracted to each other and she invites him to stay the night at her surprisingly luxurious home.

When Whistler revisits the factory the next day, the washroom attendant gives him a piece of paper and informs him they are both spies. Vlasta arranges to meet him secretly that night and she warns him to return to England immediately. However, when he returns to the hotel, Simenova, the head of the secret police, is waiting. He presents Whistler with a stark choice: sign a confession or suffer a fatal accidental fall, but Whistler creates a distraction and manages to escape.

Evading a manhunt, he turns to the only person who might be willing to help him: Vlasta. When he reaches her house in the morning however, he is shocked to find her seeing her father, Simenova, off to work. After Simenova leaves, Whistler confronts Vlasta. She offers to help him reach the British embassy, despite a cordon of communist agents. To demonstrate his good faith, he burns the crucial slip of paper he is meant to bring back to England, so that neither side can have it. Her plan almost succeeds, but Simenova is leaving the embassy as Whistler approaches and recognises him, forcing him to flee once more. Finally, he gets inside the embassy by masquerading as a milkman.

Cunliffe informs him that he is being exchanged for a spy the British have caught. At the airport, he is pleasantly surprised to find that Vlasta has been assigned to the trade mission in London and they sit next to each other as the plane departs.

== Cast ==
- Dirk Bogarde as Nicholas Whistler
- Sylva Koscina as Vlasta Simenova
- Robert Morley as Colonel Cunliffe
- Leo McKern as Simenova
- Roger Delgado as Josef
- Derek Fowlds as sunbathing man
- Amanda Grinling as Cunliffe's secretary
- Noel Harrison as Johnnie
- Philo Hauser as Vlcek
- John Junkin as clerk in opening scene
- Gertan Klauber as technician in the Czech glass factory
- John Le Mesurier as Roger Allsop
- Jill Melford as Lorna
- Derek Nimmo as Fred
- Richard Pasco as Plakov
- Eric Pohlmann as Galushka
- Alan Tilvern as Simenova's assistant
- Richard Vernon as Roddinghead
- Brook Williams as Leon
- Norman Bird as employment exchange clerk (uncredited)
- Frank Finlay as British Embassy porter (uncredited)
- William Mervyn as passenger on the plane (uncredited)
- Tiberio Mitri as the milkman (uncredited)
- George Pravda as Pravelko (uncredited)
- John Standing as Men's room attendant/British agent (uncredited)

== Production ==
Part of a trend of spy films in the wake of the success of the James Bond series, its art director was Syd Cain, who had the same job on the first two Bond films. As a result, in addition to the allusion to "007" in the opening scene, the offices of Cunliffe's glass company are (deliberately) almost an exact match to the outer waiting room and offices of "M" in the early James Bond films. Another more oblique tie to the series is that Koscina herself had been considered for the role of Tatiana Romanova in From Russia with Love.

Film rights to Lionel Davidson's novel were originally bought by American producer Hal Wallis, who wanted to make the film with Laurence Harvey. However, Wallis and Harvey had a falling out and the rights went instead to Rank and producer Betty E. Box.

Dirk Bogarde was cast in the lead. However he then decided he did not want to, as he had just made The Servant (1963). Box and director Ralph Thomas who had directed Bogarde in the "Doctor" film series were not unduly concerned as they did not feel Bogarde was ideal casting anyway, and approached Tom Courtenay instead. Courtenay agreed, but then Bogarde changed his mind again after his manager told him he needed the money.

Shooting began in September 1963. It took place in Padua, representing Prague.

Ralph Thomas later said he made the film "because I thought the script was quite funny and I loved working with Dirk. It was still during the period when he was doing those sort of roles very well."

== Reception ==
=== Critical ===
The Monthly Film Bulletin wrote: "The film falls into the trap always lying in wait for the comedy thriller: its adventures are neither funny enough for parody, nor exciting enough to stand on their own feet."

Variety wrote: "A faster pace from director Ralph Thomas and a few more red herrings and surprise situations from screenwriter Luke Heller could have worked wonders in lifting this amiable enough spoof of espionage into a top league comedy-thriller. As is, Hot Enough For June ... is a pleasant entertainment, enhanced by some amusing acting, and is a safe booking for most audiences."

Howard Thompson of The New York Times called the film: "a slick, bland shuffling of drollery and suspense, not especially new, at least by now, nor really funny. ... Most of the real fun comes from the mouth of Robert Morley."

Filmink called the movie "a lot of fun, with pleasing photography and European locations plus a superb support cast, although it’s not quite funny enough to be a spoof or exciting enough to constitute a thriller."

=== Box office ===
Kinematograph Weekly called the film a "money maker" at the British box office for 1964.
