= Smith's Gazelle =

1971 book by Lionel Davidson

Smith’s Gazelle
- First edition (UK)
- Author: Lionel Davidson
- Cover artist: Bill Botten
- Language: English
- Genre: Adventure novel
- Publisher: Jonathan Cape (UK); Alfred A. Knopf (US)
- Publication date: 1971
- Publication place: United Kingdom
- Media type: Print (Hardcover & Paperback)
- Pages: 219 pp
- ISBN: 0-394-46862-7
- OCLC: 135868
- Dewey Decimal: 823/.9/14
- LC Class: PZ4.D2515 Sm3 PR6054.A87

Smith's Gazelle is an adventure story by Lionel Davidson. First edition published in the UK by Jonathan Cape in 1971. Cover design by Bill Botten.

== Plot summary ==
A small herd of gazelles are spotted in Israel, of a species thought to be extinct. The herd is hunted until only one remains, a pregnant female.

Hamud, a disfigured Arab, kills his brother-in-law and father-in-law after they murder his wife in an honour killing. Hamud escapes to a ravine on the Syrian-Israeli border, where he captures the gazelle. The ravine is difficult to access and Hamud lives there in seclusion for several years. He rebuilds the herd to several hundred, while living off conies. He becomes convinced God has chosen him for this mission.

Above the ravine is a kibbutz. A young boy from the kibbutz, Jonathan, discovers the ravine, as does a Bedouin boy from the other side of the ravine, Musallem. They help Hamud tend the herd. Jonathan convinces Hamud he is a messenger from God.

Motke, a naturalist in the Israeli army, has an attack of malaria and sleeps through the Six-Day War. The Israelis learn of the gazelles and decide to transport them to a nature reserve. However, the gazelles stampede and escape the ravine. Hamud is killed. Many of the gazelles run into a minefield and are killed, but some survive and escape into the desert.
