= Making Good Again =

- First edition
- Author: Lionel Davidson
- Language: English
- Publisher: Jonathan Cape
- Publication date: 1968
- Publication place: United Kingdom
- Media type: Print (Hardcover & Paperback)
- Pages: 298 pp
- ISBN: 0-14-003188-X
- OCLC: 3155538

Making Good Again is a novel published in 1968 by Lionel Davidson.

== Plot summary ==
The title refers to the German word for "reparations" or "restitution", wiedergutmachung ("again good making"), that the German government agreed to pay in 1953 to the direct survivors of the Holocaust, and to those who were made to work at forced labour camps or who otherwise became victims of the Nazis.

In the 1960s, lawyer James Raison travels to Germany representing Mrs Wolff, the heir of Bamberger, a Jew who died during World War II. Wolff has already received compensation for her father's death, but a old Swiss bank account has been discovered, which Mrs Wolff may be entitled to. However, it is possible that Bamberger deposited the money on trust for a Jewish charity. Also present is Grunwald, a lawyer and rabbi from Frankfurt who now lives in Israel, representing the successor charity.

Through their investigations, they discover the Swiss bank account has been accessed recently, so Bamberger may still be alive. They visit a hunting lodge which Bamberger owned, which is now controlled by Mr Adler. Adler promises he can put them in touch with Bamberger, and lures them into a forest, where Grunwald is assaulted by fascist youths.

Ultimately they conclude that Adler was a Nazi who had Bamberger murdered, and has controlled the bank account since inception. They resolve to sue Adler for the money.

== Reception ==
A review in TIME Magazine described it as "an odd, quiet novel that contemplates the limits of private responsibility and public guilt."
