= The Rose of Tibet =

1962 novel by Lionel Davidson

- First US edition
- Author: Lionel Davidson
- Language: English
- Genre: Adventure fiction
- Publisher: Gollancz (UK); Harper & Row (US)
- Publication date: 1962
- Publication place: United Kingdom
- Media type: Print (Hardcover & Paperback)
- Pages: 315 pp
- OCLC: 6535757

The Rose of Tibet is a 1962 adventure novel by Lionel Davidson.

== Plot summary ==
Charles Houston (a teacher in London) makes a perilous and illegal journey from India into the forbidden land of Tibet during the unsettled time 1950/51, in the hope of rescuing his vanished brother. What he does not know is that his coming was prophesied a century earlier, and he is awaited by an impossible love, an enormous treasure, and the invading Red Chinese army. Houston travels to the Yamdring monastery, finds his way to the abbess and makes a perilous escape with her. The story is set at the time of the Chinese invasion in 1950.

== Critical opinion ==
Graham Greene said of the novel: "I hadn’t realised how much I had missed the genuine adventure story until I read The Rose of Tibet", while Daphne du Maurier wrote: 'It has all the excitement of King Solomon's Mines'

Author Barry Gifford considers this book the one he wishes he had written. In his collection of essays entitled The Cavalry Charges he writes that it is: "a genuine work of literature. I was immediately charmed by the device Davidson employed to entice the reader into believing he's headed in one direction and then opening up an entirely unexpected can of bedazzling worms." Gifford goes on to say: "I re-read The Rose of Tibet every few years and each time am transfixed, transported. Among so many books, poems and songs that I love, it's the one that I wish I'd written. The Rose of Tibet is also the one novel I'd really love to write the screenplay for."

In the introduction to the 2016 edition, Anthony Horowitz writes: "At the heart of the story is a remarkable love affair and a huge treasure... All of these evoke Rider Haggard and I still wonder how Davidson manages to make his fantastical descriptions seem so real... There is also a wonderful array of unforgettable characters to meet along the way."

Lawyer Marcel Berlins reviewed the book for The Times in 2016, writing: "The Rose of Tibet, if it is to be classified, is an adventure thriller, peppered with history, religion and politics... Under the author's extraordinary skill, it all seems believable."
