= Joy (Hunt novel) =

1990 novel by Marsha Hunt

- First edition cover
- Author: Marsha Hunt
- Language: English
- Genre: Novel
- Publisher: Century
- Publication date: 12 April 1991
- Publication place: United States
- Media type: Print (hardback & paperback)
- Pages: 346 pp (first edition, hardback)
- ISBN: 0-7126-3656-0 (first edition, hardback)
- OCLC: 20565027

Joy (1990) is a novel by Marsha Hunt about the relationship between two African-American women that is based on secrets, lies, and delusion. Mainly set in a posh New York apartment in the course of one day in the spring of 1987, the novel contains frequent flashbacks that describe life in a black neighbourhood in the 1950s and 1960s. The book also deals with stardom in the music business and some people's inability, despite their riches, to make their own American Dream come true and to lead fulfilled lives.

== Plot summary ==
The first person narrator of the novel is Palatine Ross, a 70-year-old cleaning woman originally from New Orleans, whose childhood is dominated by poverty and loss.

Shutting her eyes to all the evil in the world and firmly relying on God and the words of the Bible as guidance, Palatine tries to raise Joy and her sisters to be educated, honest and religious members of society. The fact that, growing up in a rough neighbourhood, the not-yet-teenaged girls are very early in their lives confronted with sex willingly escapes her notice. It troubles Palatine a great deal when Dagwood, her neighbour's new boyfriend, starts spending the night with the girls' mother. One morning during the summer vacation, while his girlfriend is at work and Palatine is taking care of the children, Dagwood stays on in the apartment.

Right from the start, Palatine tries to take the three girls along to church, seeing that their blaspheming mother will never do so. Time and again, in the course of more than twenty years, Palatine tries to convince Joy that finding herself a nice coloured boyfriend whom she could marry and have children with would be the right thing to do. However, "Chocolate Chip" remains a one-hit wonder after an interview given by Brenda to some gay magazine in which she announces her coming out as a lesbian.

However, rather than being able to mourn Joy's death, she for the first time learns things about Joy which finally force her to abandon her blinkered view of her "God-sent child" and admit that she was a sinner rather than a saint.
