= Under Plum Lake =

1980 novel by Lionel Davidson

- First edition
- Author: Lionel Davidson
- Illustrator: Mike Wilkes
- Language: English
- Genre: Children’s novel
- Publisher: Jonathan Cape
- Publication date: 1980
- Publication place: United Kingdom
- Media type: Print (Hardcover & Paperback)
- Pages: 136 pp
- ISBN: 0-394-51252-9
- OCLC: 6330758
- Dewey Decimal: 823/.914 Fic
- LC Class: PR6054.A87 U5 1980

Under Plum Lake is a children's adventure novel by Lionel Davidson, first published in 1980.

== Plot ==
A young boy, Barry, explores a cave on the Cornwall coast and discovers a highly advanced subterranean civilization called Egon. Located somewhere deep beneath Earth's oceans, Egon is unknown and inaccessible to humans unless an Egonian chooses to bring them there. On all such occasions, the human being's memories of Egon are erased and replaced with false memories before being returned to the surface.

In Egon, the author imagines all of our social ills and fears have been quieted, health care and education have been vastly improved, and energy and other resources have been better managed. Egonian youth (who are about 100 years old) spend much of their time enjoying extreme sports, taking in intense immersive films, and studying to make their world a better place. Barry gets a tour from a boy named Dido who at first treats Barry like a dog — why can't he just relax and enjoy things? — but later begins to understand Barry’s fear of pain and death.

Like Barry, the reader is ultimately left with a vision of what our lives could be if we didn't spend all our time terrified of poverty, pain, and lost chances. It's a statement in favor of pleasure, intimacy, and risk-taking.

== Reception ==
Kirkus Reviews characterised it as "a little tale, somewhere between fantasy and science fiction, that's less-than-magical yet more than nicely told", written by an author "whose oddly conceived books are usually--like this one--less than fully satisfying."

A review in Library Journal described it as "a curiously engaging novel... richly envisioned".
