= The Sun Chemist =

1976 novel by Lionel Davidson

- First edition
- Author: Lionel Davidson
- Language: English
- Genre: Thriller
- Publisher: Jonathan Cape
- Publication date: 1976
- Publication place: United Kingdom
- Media type: Print (hardcover and paperback)
- Pages: 284
- ISBN: 0-14-004479-5
- OCLC: 16425089

The Sun Chemist is a thriller novel by Lionel Davidson, published in 1976 by Jonathan Cape.

== Plot summary ==
Letters in the archive correspondence of Chaim Weizmann, first president of Israel, hint that, in his profession as a distinguished organic chemist, Weizmann had stumbled on a method for the cheap synthesis of petroleum. Now, decades later, a world buffeted by oil shocks and perpetually rising prices would welcome such a chemical miracle. But Weizmann's laboratory notebooks must be found first, and an unseen and powerful enemy will stop at nothing to keep them hidden.
