= The Night of Wenceslas =

1960 thriller novel by Lionel Davidson

- First edition (UK)
- Author: Lionel Davidson
- Language: English
- Genre: crime novel
- Publisher: Gollancz (UK); Harper & Row (US)
- Publication date: 1960
- Publication place: United Kingdom
- Media type: Print (Hardcover & Paperback)
- Pages: 224 pp
- OCLC: 8479936

The Night of Wenceslas is the debut novel of British thriller and crime writer Lionel Davidson. This Bildungsroman describes the reluctant adventures of Nicolas Whistler, a dissolute young man of mixed English and Czech parentage who finds himself caught up against his will in Cold War espionage. The novel won the Crime Writers' Association's Gold Dagger Award in 1960, and the Author's Club First Novel Award. It was filmed in 1964 under the title Hot Enough for June.

== Plot summary ==
Nicolas is a 24-year-old Londoner, a witty wastrel and the novel's archetypal anti-hero. He hates his job in his late father's glass-making business, where he works under the odious Nimek in anticipation of making full partner one day. He dreams of inheriting untold riches from his Uncle Bela in Vancouver, which will put an end to his current servitude. His bossy Irish girlfriend Maura continually presses him to make something of himself. His one true love is his car, an MG, which he bought on impulse, and its maintenance keeps him in permanent debt to the garage owner "Ratface" Ricketts.

A note arrives from a lawyer called Stephen Cunliffe, stating that his Uncle Bela has died in Canada and left him a fortune. He goes to see Cunliffe, who forwards him a sum of £200 to tide him over until he can begin to enjoy the benefits of his inheritance. However, Nicolas manages to spend this allowance in a matter of days and returns to Cunliffe's office to request a further advance.

Cunliffe now declares that Uncle Bela is very much alive; that he, Cunliffe, is in fact a moneylender and that Nicolas owes him £200, with the MG as security. The distraught Nicolas is told that he can discharge his debt if he is willing to carry out a simple assignment to Prague. He is to bring back a formula for a glass-making process from a glass factory that used to belong to Pavelka, an associate of Cunliffe's.

Nicolas travels to Prague (the city of his childhood) and stays in a plush hotel on Wenceslas Square. He is given a tour of the Czech glass-making industry and spends the night with his guide, a tall attractive girl called Vlasta Simenova. He takes with him a "Norstrund" guidebook, which he is to leave on a desk in the glass factory during his tour. The formula is then hidden inside the book, which he collects at the end of his tour.

Returning to England, Nicolas's debt is written off and he is paid a further £200. However, Cunliffe informs him that the formula is incomplete and requests him to make a second trip, taking a new Norstrund guidebook.

On this second trip, Maura gives him another Norstrund as a present, so he now has two. He tours the glass factory as before and returns to his hotel. His waiter Josef attempts to drug him and while Nicolas pretends to sleep, Josef finds one of the Norstrunds and starts to cut it open. Nicolas sees that there is a document made of rice-paper hidden in the spine of the book. Reading it, he realises that it concerns British nuclear secrets and understands that instead of smuggling glass-making secrets out of Prague, Cunliffe is using Nicolas to smuggle British nuclear secrets out of England.

In a panic, Nicolas flushes the document down the toilet. He leaves the hotel and tries to get to the British embassy, however he realises he has left his wallet and passport in the hotel room. He returns to the hotel where he is beaten up by StB agents, who think he has passed the document on.

Nicolas escapes and hides out in Prague, eventually managing to meet up with Vlasta again, but realises she is an StB agent because she has knowledge of him that he had not told her. Eventually he is able to get to the British Embassy disguised as a milkman.

In the embassy, he is interrogated and debriefed for ten weeks, before finally being made to sign the Official Secrets Act. His knowledge allows the British to capture the Czech network in Britain and Nicolas is sent home in a prisoner exchange for Cunliffe.

At the conclusion, Nicolas receives a letter from his Uncle Bela, who is in fact dying and wants Nicolas to take over his business.
