= Pollard (novel) =

Pilcrow
- First edition
- Author: Laura Beatty
- Cover artist: photo taken by David Spero at Brithdir Mawr
- Language: English
- Publisher: Chatto & Windus
- Publication date: 2008
- Publication place: United Kingdom
- Media type: Print
- Pages: 320
- Awards: Authors' Club First Novel Award
- ISBN: 0-7011-8209-1

Pollard is the debut novel of Laura Beatty, first published in hardback in 2008 by Chatto & Windus and the following year in paperback by Vintage Books. This was her first novel though she had previously written biographies. It won the Authors' Club Best First Novel Award and was shortlisted for the Ondaatje Prize

== Plot introduction ==
The novel concerns Anne, a teenager who leaves her chaotic home life and finds sanctuary in the nearby woods where she makes a new life for herself, foraging and hunting for food and building a house...

== Inspiration ==
The author lives in Salcey Forest in Northamptonshire, one of the few remaining medieval hunting forests in England and which provided the inspiration for the novel, including a tree-top walkway and survival courses.

== Reception ==
- Justine Jordan in The Guardian praises that 'Beatty has a wonderful ear for voice, especially the voices of children, and the characters she constructs through Anne's skewed perception are funny and heartbreaking by turns; but what is really impressive is how she weaves her human comedy with the most powerful nature writing.' Exploring 'questions of ownership and access, wilderness and desecration. Beatty's forest is both a modern, managed location and a magical place encircling its hundreds of years of history. Anne's hut, must look like a witch's lair . In Pollard, Beatty beautifully conveys the loneliness and the ecstasy of an unknowable character, and the charged, complex presence of the natural world around us. Both are too often only in our peripheral vision; she looks at them directly. This novel heralds an exceptional talent.'
- Olivia Laing in The Observer states 'If there is a moral in this fierce and wonderful book, it is that we, the humans, are the ones who will lose out if we continue to desecrate the complex, subtle world we have inherited. But the title suggests a rather more hopeful viewpoint. A pollard is not a natural tree, but one that has been worked by humans, altering its shape. As a symbol, the pollard suggests that something positive and unexpected can arise from our interactions with the wild. Perhaps Anne represents a way of being that remains within our grasp. If that is true, then despite its readability, Pollard is the precise opposite of escapist literature, because it gives the reader back the world.'

== See also ==
- Back-to-the-land movement
