= Matt Irwin (photographer) =

British photographer

- Born: Matthew James Irwin; 10 February 1980; Southport, England
- Died: 5 May 2016 (aged 36); London Fields, London, England
- Cause of death: Suicide by GHB overdose
- Occupation: Photographer
- Family: Carys Bray (sister)

Matthew James Irwin (10 February 1980 – 5 May 2016) was a British celebrity photographer.

== Life and career ==
Matt Irwin was born in Southport, England on 10 February 1980 and grew up in the Church of Jesus Christ of Latter-day Saints, though he "didn't believe" and "felt rejected" for being gay. His older sister is author Carys Bray. Their father was a stake president in Devon and Cornwall.

Irwin started taking photographs at age 15. He moved to London, and worked as an editor and then in-house photographer at the magazine Dazed & Confused, with his first cover shoot first in 2007.

Irwin photographed Lady Gaga, Nicki Minaj, One Direction, Rihanna, Kesha, Rita Ora, Miley Cyrus, and Cara Delevingne, among others.

== Death ==
After his friends did not hear from him for a few days, police found Irwin dead on 5 May 2016 in his London Fields flat on Mentmore Terrace. The door had been left open. His family announced he had committed suicide, which his friends believed was related to a breakup. Irwin's suicide was later confirmed by the coroner at the inquest following his death. The investigating coroner, Jaqueline Devonish, noted that he had been suffering with depression and disclosed the results of his post-mortem revealing that he had died as a result of an overdose of GHB. Irwin left an "Open letter to The World" on his laptop, in which he elaborated on his struggles with depression and "growing up in a cult". The note was published in Dazed in September 2016.
