= Saga Prize =

Black British literary award

The Saga Prize was a literary award for new Black British novelists, which ran from 1995 to 1998.

== History ==
The actress and writer Marsha Hunt established the Saga Prize in 1995 to recognise the literature emerging from 'indigenous black Britons' experiences. The prize – of £3,000 and a book contract – was for unpublished first novels. To be eligible, entrants needed a black African ancestor and to have been born in the United Kingdom or Republic of Ireland. The prize was sponsored by the travel firm Saga plc. Judges included Andrea Levy and Margaret Busby.

The "afrocentric" nature of the Saga Prize and its restrictive definition of blackness caused controversy. The Commission for Racial Equality objected to its creation, and the Society of Authors refused to support it.

The prize ran for four years and closed in 1998

== Winners and further literary careers ==
=== 1995: Diran Adebayo, Some Kind of Black ===
Some Kind of Black (1997) centred on the youthful adventures of its British-born Nigerian protagonist, Dele, in London. The book also won the Writers' Guild of Great Britain's New Writer of the Year Award, the Author's Club First Novel Award, and a Betty Trask Award. It was also longlisted for the Booker Prize.Adebayo wrote one further novel and became a Creative Writing Lecturer. Some Kind of Black is now a Virago Modern Classic and was adapted for BBC Radio 4 in 2022.

=== 1996: Joanna Traynor, Sister Josephine ===
Traynor described her novel as "a semi-autobiographical account of a foster child on a white northern working class council estate and her experience of hospital life as a nurse in Liverpool." In 2008 Traynor won a Churchill fellowship to research the impact of slavery. Traynor wrote two further novels, Divine, 1999, and Bitch Money 2000 both published by Bloomsbury.

=== 1997: Judith Bryan, Bernard and the Cloth Monkey ===
Bernard and the Cloth Monkey is a portrayal of family guilt. Bryan became a Creative Writing Lecturer at Roehampton University and wrote for theatre. Her play A Cold Snap was placed second in the 2008 Alfred Fagon Award, and was subsequently produced in 2011 as Keeping Mum, at the Brockley Jack Studio Theatre as part of Write Now 2. Bernard and the Cloth Monkey was republished in 2022 as part of a collection of rediscovered works celebrating Black Britain curated by Bernardine Evaristo.

=== 1998: Ike Eze-Anyika, Canteen Culture ===
Following this book about the police force, Eze-Anyika did not publish any further works
