= Carl Tighe =

British writer (1950–2020)

- Born: 26 April 1950; Handsworth, Birmingham, England, UK
- Died: 8 May 2020 (aged 70); England, UK
- Education: University of Wales, Swansea
- Occupations: Poet, essayist, novelist, and professor
- Children: None
- Writing career
- Language: English
- Notable work: Burning Worm (2001) Shortlisted for the 2001 Whitbread Awards
- Notable awards: Authors' Club First Novel Award
- Website: carltighe.co.uk

Carl Tighe (26 April 1950 – 8 May 2020) was a British academic, essayist, novelist, and poet. He taught in Poland during the Cold War and was the first Professor of Creative Writing in the UK at the University of Derby.

== Biography ==
Carl Tighe was born in Handsworth, Birmingham. His father had emigrated from Ireland just before World War II and his mother was English.

He started writing poems and short stories as a teenager, and had some published in Ambit magazine; an influence was J. G. Ballard and this led to him applying to study English literature at Swansea University where he graduated in 1973. He completed an MA in 1974 and taught for a month in Poland. However permanent work eluded him and he subsequently held a variety of low-paid jobs, including gutting and cleaning fish, working as a Red Coat at Butlin's and lavatory attendant at a mental hospital to get him by. During this time he got an offer to teach English in Poland and went to Wrocław and Gdańsk for two years on local contracts, taking the train through West and East Germany. He returned to Wales and after two years teaching night-classes at the Mid-Glamorgan Institute of Higher Education, he returned to Poland from 1980 to 1981, where he taught at the Jagiellonian University in Kraków for the British Council and helped monitor foreign radio for Solidarność. Upon returning to Britain he moved to Cardiff and began writing plays for community theatre in Wales, script-reading for the BBC and writing a book on the history and culture of Gdańsk on the Polish-German frontier. He left Wales in 1988 to teach for the extramural department at Manchester University, where he taught English and English for Academic Purposes.

He began his PhD studies in 1989 and was awarded his doctorate in 1994 with a theses exploring the responses of Polish writers toward Communism. It was partly examined by Norman Davies.

His first full time post was as a lecturer in English at the University of Derby in 1998, where in 2000 he led the UK's first undergraduate degree in Creative Writing and in 2004 he became the first Professor of Creative Writing in the country.

During his career Tighe carried out research into writing in Poland, where he lived for three years, America, and Hungary and presented at conferences as far afield as Italy, Wales and Turkey. A favourite retreat was Rhodes. Tighe's research interests were primarily centred in Central European Literature and comparative politics, but he also wrote upon areas as diverse as the works of Heinrich Böll, Gunter Grass, Bret Easton Ellis, Stanislav Lem and Franz Six. Much of this work appeared in the Journal of European Studies.

In December 2018 he was awarded a Doctor of Letters from the University of Manchester for his contribution to the understanding of Polish literature, history and culture.

Tighe died on 8 May 2020, from COVID-19 during the COVID-19 pandemic in England, twelve days after his 70th birthday.

== Writing career ==
By the late 1990s he had written numerous plays and books. He had written for BBC Radio 4, Ambit, and many of his essays had appeared in the Journal of European Studies. His first book of short stories Rejoice was shortlisted for the Irish Times fiction award and he won the All-London Drama Award, 1988 for his stage play A Whisper in the Wind.

Though he had been writing for some time, publishing a novel eluded him. After sending his novel, based on his time in Poland, to countless publishers and getting continuous rejections Tighe did not think his novel would ever hit the shelves. He had almost lost hope but then a small independent press published the novel which went on to earn nominations and awards. The novel, Burning Worm, was shortlisted for Whitbread Award 2002 and won the Authors' Club Best First Novel Award.

== Awards ==
Tighe has had several awards and nominations for his writing

- A Whisper in the Wind, All-London Drama Award, 1988
- Gdańsk Nominated for the Silver PEN Award, 1991
- Rejoice! Nominated for the David Higham Award, 1992
- Rejoice! Shortlisted for The Irish Times Fiction Prize, November 1993
- Pax: Variations, Winner of City Life Writer of the Year 2000 Award
- Burning Worm Shortlisted for Whitbread Award 2002
- Burning Worm Winner of Authors' Club Best First Novel Award 2002

== Works ==
=== Novels ===
- Burning Worm (Impress, 2001)
- KssssS: A Tale of Sex, Money & Alien Invasion (IMPress, 2004)
- Druids Hill (Five Leaves, 2008)

=== Short story collections ===
- Rejoice! And Other Stories (Jonathan Cape, 1992)
- Pax: Variations (IMPress, 2000)
- Guerilla Writing (Independently Published via Amazon Kindle, 2021).

=== Academic books ===
- Gdańsk: National Identity in the Polish German Borderlands (Pluto, 1989)
- The Politics of Literature: Polish Writers and Communism 1945-89 (University of Wales Press, 1999)
- Writing and Responsibility (Routledge, 2005)
- Writing the World: Writing as a Subject of Study (Kingston University Press, 2014)
- Tradition, Literature and Politics in East-Central Europe (Routledge, 2021).

=== Teaching books ===
- Creative and Professional Writing @ University (Independently Published, 2020)
- An Archive of Essays (Independently Published, 2020)

=== Short fiction ===
- 'Day Out' Element 5, no.3, 1983
- 'The Bird House' Spectrum, June 1983
- 'The Colour of Your Money' Iron, no.46, June 1985
- 'A Happy Story' Frames, no.4, 1985
- 'Rejoice' Planet, June 1985
- 'A State of Mind' Planet, August 1987
- 'And Now This' Ambit, no.113, August 1988
- 'And Now This' 20/20, August 1989
- 'Bug Out' Ambit: Irish Edition, no.115, February 1989
- 'Bug Out' Blueprint, August 1989
- 'Interviews after Midnight' Margins, no.10, April, 1990
- 'And Now This' Passport, no.3, 1991
- 'En Nu Dit' De Tweede Ronde, Spring 1991
- 'Underground' New Hungarian Quarterly, no.124, winter 1991
- 'Medhbh' Literary Review, February 1992
- 'Reservations' Metropolitan, winter 1993
- 'Snowman' Metropolitan, winter 1994
- 'A State of Mind' The Big Issue in the North, 19–25 August 1996
- 'Visa' Metropolitan, spring 1997
- 'Hartland' Ambit, no.149, July 1997
- 'Al Haqq' Ambit, no.151, February 1998
- 'Driving Der Führer' De Tweede Ronde, August 1998
- 'Visiting Auntie' Ambit, no.158, November 1999
- 'Visiting Auntie' www.ambit.co.uk November 1999
- 'Visiting Auntie' Heads Exhibition Derby Museum & Art Gallery 15–27 January 2000
- 'Rejoice!' (German trans), Erkundungen: 28 Walisische Erzahler, Berlin, 1989
- 'And Now This', Best Short Stories of 1989, G. Gordon & D. Hughes (eds.), 1990
- 'And Now This', Minerva Short Stories 2, G. Gordon & D. Hughes (eds.), 1991
- 'Medhbh', Six Irish Writers, M. McKernan (ed.), Cape, 1992.
- 'Trumpet of Victory', Telling Stories 3, D. Minshull (ed.), BBC publications, 1994
- 'Virtporn', Waterstone's Alien Landings, August 1997
- 'Reservations', The Best Short Stories of 1994, G. Gordon & D. Hughes (eds.), 1994
- 'KssssS' (selection from novel) Ambit, no.167, January 2002
- 'Visiting Auntie', Manchester Stories 3, R. Page (ed.), City Life 2002
- 'No Breakfast', www.the-phone-book.com September 2002
- 'Living in the Irish Sea', The Quiet Quarter anthology of New Irish Writing, RTÉ/New Island (Dublin), 2004
- 'Living in the Irish Sea', short story, The Quiet Quarter: Ten Years of Great Irish Writing, RTÉ/Lyric fm/New Island (Dublin)
- 'Best Man', The Warwick Review, March 2010
- 'Neighbours and Strangers', Ambit no 200, spring 2010
- 'Six Memories', The Warwick Review, June 2012
- 'Two Nuns', Istanbul Review: The Screen of Literature (Istanbul) March 2013
- 'Early Days', Ambit no 213, August 2013

=== Poetry ===
- 'Five Poems', Element 5, 1982
- 'Four Poems', Frames, 3, 1985
- 'Three Poems', Iron 42, February 1984
- 'Black Man, White Man', Poets against Apartheid, Wales Anti-Apartheid Movement
- 'Black Man, White Man', Poetry Street 2, D. Orme & J. Sale (eds.), 1990,
- 'Black Man, White Man', English GC4 Workbook, Berlin 1995
- 'Two Poems', The Affectionate Punch 2, November 1995
- 'Crazy Eddie and the Teaching Machine', Citi-Zine (Derby) June 2010
- 'Seven poems', Ambit no 203, February 2011
- 'Fourteen Poems', The Swansea Review Spring 2012 (www.swanseareview.com/2012/editorial)
- 'Joyspring', 80 Words for Martin Bax, Ambit Press, August 2013

=== Stage plays ===
- The Walking Upright Show, (joint author) Studio Group 1974
- Work in Progress, a radio play, published in Prospect 1, 1974
- Little Dogs, with music by Lydia Aylot, Gdańsk, 1976
- The 'A' Card, Open Cast Theatre, commissioned and produced, 1977
- Effie's Folly or Ignorance Rewarded, Open Cast Theatre, 1979
- Fair Play, co-devised and scripted, Open Cast Theatre, 1979
- Jewels, reading by Studio Group, 1979; reading by PoW! 1985; reading by Tabard Theatre, 1986
- The Prince and the Dragon, reading by Made in Wales, 1983
- How to be a Lady: v.1 and v.2, co-scripted, Chwarae Teg, 1981–82
- The Big Break, Action PIE, commissioned and produced 1982
- The Hammer and the Anvil, reading by PoW! 1984; reading by Tabard, 1985
- Comic Cabaret Sketches, 24 Hour Speaking Programme, 1984-5
- A Whisper in the Wind, winner of the All-London Drama Prize, 1987
- Rejoice! Commissioned by WOT Theatre, Cardiff 1989; Soho Theatre, workshop, April 1997
- KssssS, stage-play version of the novel, commissioned by Contact Theatre with development finance from the BBC and North West Arts Board, spring 2003

=== Radio scripts ===
- Little Jack Horner, BBC Wales / Raidió Teilifís Éireann Dublin, 1985
- Baku! Commissioned and devised for BBC Wales, 1986
- 'The Bird House', BBC Wales, Morning Story, 11 April 1989
- 'The Trumpet of Victory', BBC Radio 4, Afternoon Story, 19 July 1993
- 'Day Out', BBC Radio 4, Afternoon Story, 31 August 1994
- 'Andrzej, Polish Poet', BBC Radio 4, Afternoon Story, 6 December 1995
- 'April Fool', BBC Radio 4, Afternoon Story, 1 April 1996
- 'Lucy', BBC Radio 4, Afternoon Story, 9 September 1996
- 'Radio Regen Tall Tales: Burning Worm', Radio Regen, 13 August 2000
- 'One' Lyric fm, The Quiet Quarter, Raidió Teilifís Éireann, 24 June 2002
- 'Two' Lyric fm, The Quiet Quarter, Raidió Teilifís Éireann, 25 June 2002
- 'Three' Lyric fm, The Quiet Quarter, Raidió Teilifís Éireann, 26 June 2002
- 'Four' Lyric fm, The Quiet Quarter, Raidió Teilifís Éireann, 27 June 2002
- 'Five' Lyric fm, The Quiet Quarter, Raidió Teilifís Éireann, 28 June 2002
- 'Mothers' BBC Radio 4, Off the Page, 6 Sept 2002
- 'Naggety-Nag' Lyric fm, The Quiet Quarter, Raidió Teilifís Éireann, 24 December 2002

=== Academic articles ===
- 'Andrzej D: Polish Poet' Poetry Wales, spring 1988

=== Journal articles ===
- Franz Six: A Career in the Shadows, Journal of European Studies, 2007.
- Budapest Diary, Journal of European Studies, 2010.

=== Edited works ===
- The Playwrights' Register (Yr Academi Gymreig, 1984)
