= David James Mossman =

David James Mossman (10 September 1926 – 5 April 1971) was a British journalist, broadcaster, TV reporter, film-maker, interviewer and former MI6 agent.

== Career ==
With producer David Webster, he made two notable programmes about the 1964 US presidential election: A Choice or an Echo, about the differences between Lyndon Johnson and Barry Goldwater; and Thunder on the Left, about the Right-wingers surrounding Goldwater. He was a member of the Panorama team in the 1960s specialising in foreign affairs, with a famously acerbic interviewing style. He once verbally attacked then-Prime Minister Harold Wilson live on air, over his support of US President Lyndon Johnson over the Vietnam War. On another occasion, he took the Singapore prime minister to task for his habit of throwing his political opponents in jail. Eventually, he was reassigned to presenting regular arts slot by the BBC because of the controversy around his interviewing style.

== Personal life ==
As a high-profile news reporter but closeted gay man in an era where homosexuality was outlawed, by the mid-1960s Mossman fell in love with Canadian Louis Hanssen. Hanssen was married to a woman and eight years younger than Mossman, however this didn't stop a relationship forming between the two. Hanssen died in 1968 of an accidental overdose.

== Death ==
In 1971, Mossman committed suicide in his cottage in Norfolk by taking a fatal overdose of barbiturates, leaving behind a note that read: "I can't bear it any more, though I don't know what 'it' is."

== In popular culture ==
Peter Shaffer, the author of the play Equus, claimed that during a stay at the Norfolk cottage, Mossman, of whom he was a friend, told him the story on which he based the play.

On 14 February 2007, The Reporter, a play by Nicholas Wright based on his book and directed by Richard Eyre, premiered at the Royal National Theatre in London. The play explores the social climate in the years before Mossman's death as well as the reasons for the death itself.

== Bibliography ==
- Rebels in paradise : Indonesia's civil war, Jonathan Cape publishers, 1961, ISBN B0007KG0SE
- Beggars on horseback. Little Brown, 1966, ISBN B0007DRYJ0 – winner of the Author's Club First Novel Award
- Love, Love, Love, BBC, 1967, ISBN B0007K7YY8
- Lifelines, Bodley Head, 1971, ISBN 0-370-01430-8
