= Segun Afolabi =

Nigerian novelist and short story writer

Segun Afolabi (born 1966) is a Nigerian novelist and short story writer born in Kaduna, Nigeria.

He is the son of a career diplomat. With his family, he moved frequently throughout his childhood, from country to country in Africa, Asia, Europe, and North America. Several critics have remarked on this experience as an obvious influence on his writing.

Afolabi won the 2005 Caine Prize for the story "Monday Morning", first published in Wasafiri, issue 41, spring 2004. His first novel, Goodbye Lucille, was published in April 2007 and won the Authors' Club Best First Novel Award. He was shortlisted for the Caine Prize in 2015.
