= A Long Way to Shiloh =

1966 thriller novel by Lionel Davidson

- First US edition
- Author: Lionel Davidson
- Language: English
- Publisher: Gollancz (UK); Harper & Row (US)
- Publication date: 1966
- Publication place: United Kingdom
- Media type: Print (Hardcover & Paperback)
- Pages: 239

A Long Way to Shiloh is a thriller by Lionel Davidson, published in 1966 by Victor Gollancz Ltd and in the US (under the title The Menorah Men) by Harper & Row. It was a Book Society Choice and won both the Crime Writers' Association's Gold Dagger Award and the Crime Critics' Award for Best Thriller of the Year.

== Plot summary ==
30-year-old womaniser and drunkard Caspar Laing has just been made Professor of Semitic Languages at Bedfordshire University - or, as he sardonically refers to it, the University of Beds. Prior to taking up his post, he is summoned to the Israeli Embassy to confer with the visiting Professor Agrot. An ancient parchment has recently been discovered that appears to report on the hiding of the Menorah, a holy candelabrum rescued from the Jerusalem Temple before its destruction by the Romans. But the Jordanians have a better copy of the parchment, and both of these refer to the location of a third which has details of the actual hiding place of the holy artefact, dating from the time of King Solomon. According to this account it was only a copy that was taken to Rome after the sack of Jerusalem in 70 CE. The race is on, therefore, to recover the treasure before the Arabs get to it.

The Jordanians have already sent scouting parties into the Mount Tabor area north of Jerusalem in search of the third parchment without success. In hope of treating their parchment with chemicals for greater legibility, Caspar visits an old colleague but is waylaid by Jordanians who try to kidnap him over the frontier. He barely manages to escape in time and hides out with the family of Shoshana, the driver of his military jeep, living in Tel Aviv. There Caspar begins to suspect that the report is full of coded misdirections and leaves southwards to prospect in the barren Wilderness of Zin, where he rescues Shoshana from a flash flood and eventually seduces her.

Another clue alerts Caspar to the fact that not only have directions been reversed but the distances mentioned in the parchment must be halved. This narrows his search to the wilderness area behind the Dead Sea, where the border between Jordan and Israel is imprecisely defined and his search takes him into the rugged terrain on the Jordanian side. No sooner has he located the crucial third parchment than he is spotted by a border patrol and taken for a narcotics smuggler. Escaping with difficulty over the Dead Sea, he reaches the kibbutz where his friends are camped.

What the searchers eventually learn is that the hiding place for the Menorah is beneath the foundations of a new hotel. The question of locating it is debated at a special rabbinic court but the verdict is against disturbing the Menorah's hiding place - not without the suspicion of indirect bribery on the part of Teitleman, the capitalist responsible for building the hotel. Caspar, the foreigner who understands the two-tongued language of the land, then returns to the safety of his academic haven.

== Background ==
The novel was written following a visit by Davidson to Israel, to which he returned for a ten-year stay in 1968. It has been particularly commended for its descriptive treatment of the country. However, the geographical and political situation described there was considerably changed by the Six-Day War of 1967. An ironical but later change was the creation of a factual University of Bedfordshire in 1993, initially based in Luton rather than Bedford.
