= Carys Bray =

British novelist (born 1975)

Carys Bray FRSL
- Born: Carys Anne Irwin; December 1975; Southport, England
- Education: Open University; Edge Hill University
- Occupation: Novelist
- Relatives: Matt Irwin (brother)
- Writing career
- Notable awards: Authors' Club Best First Novel Award; Scott Prize; Edge Hill Prize

Carys Anne Bray FRSL (née Irwin; born December 1975) is a British writer.

== Early life and education ==
Bray was born in Southport to a strict Mormon family. She spent her teen years in Exeter; her father was a local stake president in Devon and Cornwall.

Bray graduated with a Bachelor of Arts (BA) in English literature from Open University in 2008 and subsequently completed a Master of Arts (MA) at Edge Hill University in 2010 followed by a PhD.

== Career ==
Bray is a lapsed Mormon, and her debut novel A Song for Issy Bradley (2014) follows a Mormon family undergoing a crisis of faith.

Her second novel, The Museum of You, was published in 2016.

According to The Bookseller, she earned a "strong five figure" advance in 2019 for a novel about climate change, entitled When the Lights Go Out. The book was published in 2020.

== Personal ==
At age 20, Bray married and subsequently had five children before deciding to return to education in her 30s. Her younger brother was the late photographer Matt Irwin (1980–2016).

Bray uses a treadmill desk when writing.

== Awards and honours ==
- 2010: Edge Hill Short Story Prize for MA Creative Writing
- 2011: Scott Prize
- 2015: Authors' Club Best First Novel Award
- 2023: Elected a Fellow of the Royal Society of Literature (FRSL)
