= Diran Adebayo =

British novelist, cultural critic and academic

Diran Adebayo FRSL
- Born: Oludiran Adebayo; 30 August 1968 (age 58); Islington, London, England
- Education: Malvern College; University of Oxford
- Occupations: Writer, cultural critic and academic
- Relatives: Dotun Adebayo (brother)
- Writing career
- Notable work: Some Kind of Black (1996)
- Notable awards: Author's Club First Novel Award; Betty Trask Award; Saga Prize
- Website: diranadebayo.com

Oludiran "Diran" Adebayo FRSL (born 30 August 1968) is a British novelist, cultural critic and academic best known for his 1996 novel Some Kind of Black.

== Early life and education ==
Oludiran Adebayo was born on 30 August 1968 in London, to Nigerian parents. He won a Major Scholarship when he was 12 to Malvern College and is an Oxford University Law graduate. Among his friends at Wadham College, Oxford, were the writers Monica Ali and Hari Kunzru.

== Career ==
Prior to winning the Saga Prize in 1995, Adebayo worked as senior news reporter at The Voice newspaper and as a reporter on BBC Television

Adebayo's debut novel, Some Kind of Black (1997), centred on the youthful adventures of its protagonist, Dele, was one of the first to articulate a British-born African perspective, and won several awards.(below) His follow-up book, the fable My Once Upon A Time, was set in a near-future London-like western city and fused noir with Yoruba folklore. The novel made use of the song "Heaven and Hell" by Chef Raekwon of the Wu-Tang Clan. In 2009, Adebayo donated the short story "Calculus" to Oxfam's "Ox-Tales" project.

Adebayo was a columnist for the now defunct New Nation newspaper, and has written on race, arts and sports for newspapers such as The Guardian, The Independent and New Statesman magazine. He has been featured in The Sunday Times magazine and ES magazine and has appeared as a guest contributor on TV news and arts programmes such as 'Novels That Shaped Our World' and 'The Trouble with Naipaul’. In 2004 Adebayo co-edited New Writing 12, the British Council's annual anthology of British and Commonwealth literature, with Blake Morrison and Jane Rogers. In 2005, Adebayo was Writer-in-residence at the British Museum and the first guest director of the Cheltenham Literature Festival.

In 2006, Adebayo was the International Writing Fellow at Southampton University, before a residency at Georgetown University. In 2012-13, Adebayo was a Royal Literary Fund Fellow. Adebayo was a Creative Writing Lecturer at Lancaster University and is BA Creative Writing Course Leader at the University of Kingston, London.

Adebayo is a former trustee of The Book Trust and the Arts Council of England. He stepped down from the Arts Council in 2010 following controversy over the acceptance of a grant.

In 2022, Adebayo adapted and serialised Some Kind of Black for BBC Radio 4. The novel is now a Virago Modern Classic.

In 2026, Adebayo was one of the judges for the Royal Society of Literature's International Writers programme and has also co-judged Wasafiri magazine's New Writing Prize.

== Recognition and awards ==
Adebayo is a Fellow of the Royal Society of Literature and of the Santa Maddalena Foundation,

Some Kind of Black (1997) won the Writers' Guild of Great Britain's New Writer of the Year Award, the Authors' Club Best First Novel Award, the 1996 Saga Prize, and a Betty Trask Award. It was also longlisted for the Booker Prize.

In 2000, Vienna University awarded Adebayo the $60,000 Abraham Woursell stipend, a prize for young noteworthy European writers.

In 2001 the writer Zadie Smith, praised him for his "humanness", arguing that he is one of a few English writers who "trade in both knowledge and feeling". In 2002 The Times Literary Supplement named him as one of the Best Young British Novelists.

In 2017, he was one of 20 people to have their portraits taken by Oxford University for permanent display, as part of its "Diversifying Portraiture" initiative, in recognition of his "achievements and contributions to the University and to the literary world".

== Personal life ==
He is the younger brother of the writer, journalist, publisher and broadcaster Dotun Adebayo.

== Publications ==
- Some Kind of Black (1997)
- My Once Upon A Time (2001)
- New Writing 12 (co-editor, 2004)
