= The Chelsea Murders =

1978 thriller novel by Lionel Davidson

- First edition
- Author: Lionel Davidson
- Cover artist: D.G. Rossetti "The Blessed Damozel", 1878
- Language: English
- Genre: Thriller
- Publisher: Jonathan Cape
- Publication date: 1978
- Publication place: United Kingdom
- Media type: Print (Hardcover & Paperback)
- Pages: 237 pp
- ISBN: 0-14-005136-8
- OCLC: 59018354

The Chelsea Murders (known in the USA as Murder Games) is a 1978 thriller novel by Lionel Davidson. The book won the Crime Writers' Association's Gold Dagger Award.

== Plot summary ==
Someone is killing residents of the hip bohemian London neighborhood of Chelsea, home to literary giants of the past like Virginia Woolf. What thread connects them in someone's mad mind? The only clue is a fragment of film, which accidentally caught images of the murderer, dressed in an outlandish costume and mask.

== Television adaptation ==
An adaptation of the novel was broadcast in 1981, directed by Derek Bennett as a Television film and was released on DVD in March 2010.
