= Neil Griffiths (novelist) =

British novelist

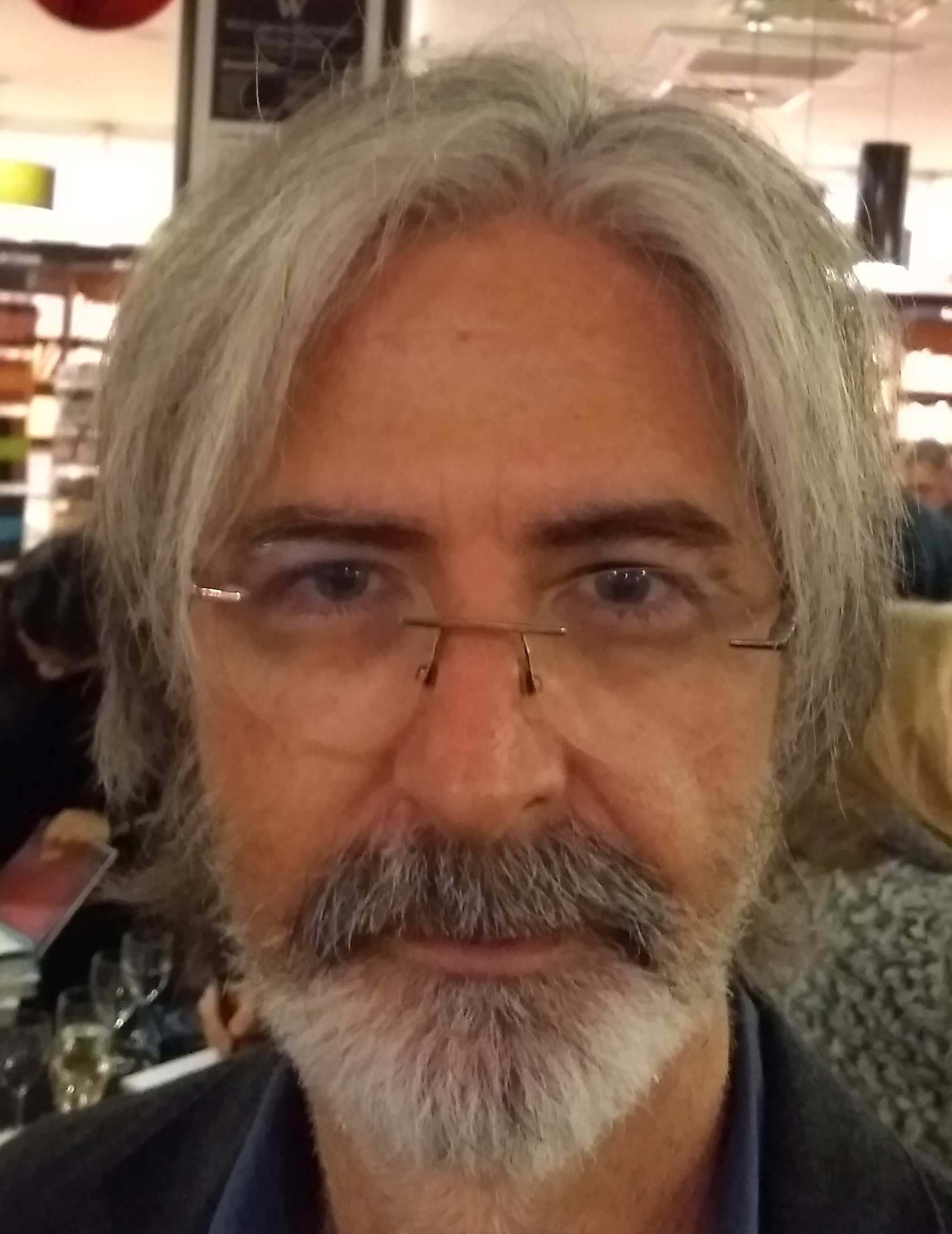
Neil Griffiths, 2017

Neil Griffiths is a British novelist, and the founder of the Republic of Consciousness Prize for Small Presses. He is the winner of the Authors' Club First Novel Award, and has been shortlisted for best novel in the Costa Book Awards.

== Early life ==
Neil Griffiths was born in south London, and grew up in "various places in the South East of England".

== Career ==
Griffiths is writer, publisher and creative writing tutor.

His first novel, Betrayal in Naples, won the Authors' Club First Novel Award, and Saving Caravaggio was shortlisted for the best novel in the Costa Book Awards (formerly the Whitbread Prize).. His critically acclaimed memoir The Wrong Son was published in 2026.

In 2016, Griffiths launched the Republic of Consciousness Prize for Small Presses, to celebrate "small presses producing brilliant and brave literary fiction" in the UK and Ireland, with £2,000 of his own money, and he is hoping other authors will add to this, to get the prize up to about £10,000. The Prize has received support from the Times Literary Supplement, and funding from the Arts Council, and the winner will receive at least £5,000, and all shortlisted books £1,000. The longlist was announced in December 2017.

Until 2016, Griffiths himself had been published by Penguin, a large publisher, and announced that his next novel, As a God Might Be (then provisionally called Family of Love), would be placed with a small publisher - it was published by Dodo Ink in 2017.

Griffiths has been a creative writing tutor for over 25 years at B.A. and M.A. level and a one-to-one mentor to over 30 writers, many who have gone onto be published. He's taught across genres, including literary fiction, genre fiction and memoir. He is quoted as saying: "Teaching creative writing is one of my passions. It gives me more immediate joy than any of my other work and hope my students feel that I communicate this by really listening to their needs and offering an individual pathways to improvement."

Griffiths blogs on literary matters for The Guardian.

== Selected publications ==
- Betrayal in Naples (Penguin, London, 2004)
- Saving Caravaggio (Penguin, London, 2006)
- As a God Might Be (Dodo Ink, 2017)
- The Wrong Son (Weatherglass Books, 2026)

== Personal life ==
He lives in London.
