= Run for Your Life (Line novel) =

1966 novel by Lionel Davidson

Run For Your Life
- First edition
- Author: Lionel Davidson
- Language: English
- Genre: Children’s novel
- Publisher: Jonathan Cape
- Publication date: 1966
- Publication place: United Kingdom
- Media type: Print (Hardcover & Paperback)
- Pages: 153 pp

Run For Your Life (known in the US as Soldier and Me) is a children's adventure novel by Lionel Davidson writing as David Line, first published in 1966. An English boy, Woolcott, and his friend Szolda (whom he calls Soldier) are on the run because Szolda has overheard two men plotting a murder. Filmed as a TV series in 1974 using the US title Soldier and Me starring Gerry Sundquist as Woolcott and Richard Willis as Szolda. 9 30 minute episodes made by Granada Television.
