= Laura Beatty =

British writer (born 1963)

Laura Mary Catherine Beatty (née Keen; born 1 May 1963) is a writer awarded the Authors' Club First Novel Award for her 2008 novel Pollard, also shortlisted for the Ondaatje Prize.

She has also written two biographies, the first about Lillie Langtry which contained the first publication of correspondence between Lillie and her lover Arthur Jones.

== Personal life ==
She is the daughter of Charles Keen and Lady Priscilla Mary Rose Curzon, eldest daughter of Edward Curzon, 6th Earl Howe. Her brother is actor Will Keen (father of actress Dafne Keen) and her sister is poet Alice Oswald. On 29 September 1990, she married the Hon. Nicholas Beatty, son of David Field Beatty, 2nd Earl Beatty. They have one son, David Brin Charles Beatty (born 1992).

== Bibliography ==
=== Non-fiction ===
- Lillie Langtry, Manner, Masks and Morals (1999, Chatto & Windus)
- Anne Boleyn, The Wife Who Lost Her Head (2001, Short Books, for children aged 10+)
- Looking for Theophrastus: travels in search of a lost philosopher (2022, Atlantic Books)

=== Fiction ===
- Pollard (2008, Chatto & Windus)
- Darkling (2014, Chatto & Windus)
- Lost Property (2019, Atlantic Books)
