= Authors' Club Best First Novel Award =

English-language literary award

The Authors' Club Best First Novel Award is awarded by the Authors' Club to the most promising first novel of the year, written by a British or Irish author and published in the UK during the calendar year preceding the year in which the award is presented. Inaugurated in 1954, the Authors' Club Best First Novel Award is the longest-running UK prize for debut fiction and – except for the James Tait Black and the Hawthornden – the oldest literary prize in Britain.

== Winner ==
Award recipients
Year	Author	Title	Ref.
1954	David Unwin	The Governor's Wife	
1955	Brian Moore	Judith Hearne	
1956	Harry Bloom	Episode	
1957	Edmund Ward	Summer in Retreat	
1958	Alan Sillitoe	Saturday Night and Sunday Morning	
1959	David Caute	At Fever Pitch	
1960	Lionel Davidson	The Night of Wenceslas	
1961	Jim Hunter	The Sun in the Morning	
1962	John Pearson	Gone to Timbuctoo	
1963	David Rubin	The Greater Darkness	
1964	Robin Douglas-Home	Hot for Certainties	
1965	David James Mossman	Beggars on Horseback	
1966	Leslie Thomas	The Virgin Soldiers	
1967	Paul Bailey	At the Jerusalem	
1968	Barry England	Figures in a Landscape	
1969	Peter Tinniswood	A Touch of Daniel	
1970	Rachel Ingalls	Theft	
1971	Rosemary Hawley Jarman	We Speak No Treason	
1973	Jennifer Johnston	The Captains and the Kings	
1975	Sasha Moorsom	A Lavender Trip	
1977	Barbara Benson	The Underlings	
1978	Katharine Gordon	The Emerald Peacock	
1979	Martin Page	The Pilate Plot	
1980	Dawn Lowe-Watson	The Good Morrow	
1981	Anne Smith	The Magic Glass	
1982	Frances Vernon	Privileged Children	
1983	Katherine Moore	Summer at the Haven	
1984	Frederick R. Hyde-Chambers	Lama: A Novel of Tibet	
1985	Magda Sweetland	Eightsome Reel	
1986	Helen Harris	Playing Fields in Winter	
1987	Peter Benson	The Levels	
1988	Gilbert Adair	The Holy Innocents	
1989	Lindsey Davis	The Silver Pigs	
1990	Alan Brownjohn	The Way You Tell Them	
1991	Zina Rohan	The Book of Wishes and Complaints	
1992	David Park	The Healing	
1993	Nadeem Aslam	Season of the Rainbirds	
1994	Andrew Cowan	Pig	
1995	T. J. Armstrong	Walter and the Resurrection of G	
1996	Diran Adebayo	Some Kind of Black	
1996	Rhidian Brook	The Testimony of Taliesin Jones	
1997	Mick Jackson	The Underground Man	
1998	Jackie Kay	Trumpet	
1999	Ann Harries	Manly Pursuits	
2000	Brian Clarke	The Stream	
2001	Carl Tighe	Burning Worm	
2002	Ben Faccini	The Water Breather	
2003	Dan Rhodes	Timoleon Vieta Come Home	
2004	Susan Fletcher	Eve Green	
2004	Neil Griffiths	Betrayal in Naples	
2005	Henry Shukman	Sandstorm	
2006	Nicola Monaghan	The Killing Jar	
2007	Segun Afolabi	Goodbye Lucille	
2009	Laura Beatty	Pollard	
2010	Anthony Quinn	The Rescue Man	
2011	Jonathan Kemp	London Triptych	
2012	Kevin Barry	City of Bohane	
2013	Ros Barber	The Marlowe Papers	
2013	I. J. Kay	Mountains of the Moon	
2014	Jack Wolf	The Tale of Raw Head and Bloody Bones	
2015	Carys Bray	A Song for Issy Bradley	
2016	Benjamin Johncock	The Last Pilot	
2017	Rowan Hisayo Buchanan	Harmless Like You	
2018	Gail Honeyman	Eleanor Oliphant Is Completely Fine	
2019	Guy Gunaratne	In Our Mad and Furious City	
2020	Claire Adam	Golden Child	
2021	Ingrid Persaud	Love After Love	
2022	Tish Delaney	Before My Actual Heart Breaks	
2023	Ayanna Lloyd Banwo	When We Were Birds	
2024	Viktoria Lloyd-Barlow	All the Little Bird-Hearts	
2025	Ferdia Lennon	Glorious Exploits	
