= Lionel Davidson =

English writer (1922–2009)

Lionel Davidson FRSL
- Born: 31 March 1922; Hull, England
- Died: October 21, 2009 (aged 87); London, England
- Writing career
- Pen name: David Line
- Genres: spy thrillers; children's novels

Lionel Davidson FRSL (31 March 1922 – 21 October 2009) was an English novelist who wrote spy thrillers. He received Authors' Club Best First Novel Award once and the Gold Dagger Award three times.

== Biography ==
Lionel Davidson was born in 1922 in Hull in Yorkshire, one of nine children of an immigrant Polish-Jewish tailor and trade-union militant, formerly named Davidowitz (see History of the Jews in Kingston upon Hull). His mother was from Vilnius, Lithuania; Davidson taught her to read and write. His father died when he was two. Davidson left school early and worked in the London offices of The Spectator magazine as an office boy. Later, he joined the Keystone Press Agency. During the Second World War, he served with the Submarine Service of the Royal Navy.

When the war ended, he returned to the Keystone Agency and travelled all over Europe as a freelance reporter. It was during one of these trips that he came up with the idea for his first thriller, The Night of Wenceslas (1960). The novel is set in Czechoslovakia during the Cold War, and tells the story of young Nicolas Whistler, a 24-year-old Londoner who is persuaded to take a bogus business trip to Prague which goes horribly awry. The Night of Wenceslas was an instant success, inviting favourable comparisons with Eric Ambler. Davidson became one of the handful of living writers to have their first novel appear in a green Penguin jacket. The book won the Crime Writers' Association's Gold Dagger Award (the top prize for crime and spy fiction in Britain) as well as the Authors' Club First Novel Award. It was filmed as Hot Enough for June (1964), with Dirk Bogarde in the role of Whistler.

His second novel The Rose of Tibet (1962) was equally well received. A Long Way to Shiloh (1966) won Davidson his second Gold Dagger, and he achieved a third with The Chelsea Murders (1978). The Chelsea Murders was also adapted for television as part of Thames TV's Armchair Thriller series in 1981.

Many of Davidson's relatives were killed in the Holocaust. In the 1960s he became more interested in his Jewish heritage, and moved his family to Israel in 1968. His 1968 novel Making Good Again contains reflections on Jewish identity and holocaust reparations.

Davidson went into an extended hiatus after the publication of The Chelsea Murders. He was not to write another thriller for the next sixteen years. Kolymsky Heights appeared in 1994 to international acclaim.

Davidson never quite managed to fulfil his early promise to become a major figure in British spy fiction, although his best novels are of high quality. In 2001, he was awarded the CWA's Cartier Diamond Dagger lifetime achievement award, for making "a significant contribution to crime fiction published in the English language".

Davidson wrote a number of children's novels under the pseudonym David Line. Run For Your Life is an example.

His first wife, Fay Jacobs, died in 1988. His second wife was Frances Ullman. Davidson died on 21 October 2009 in north London aged 87, from lung cancer.

== Awards ==
Awards for Davidson's writing
Year	Title	Award	Result	Ref.
1960	The Night of Wenceslas	Authors' Club Best First Novel Award	Won	
1960	The Night of Wenceslas	Gold Dagger	Won	
1962	The Night of Wenceslas	Edgar Allan Poe Award for Best Novel	Shortlisted	
1966	A Long Way to Shiloh	Gold Dagger	Won	
1978	The Chelsea Murders	Gold Dagger	Won	
1995	Kolymsky Heights	Anthony Award for Best Novel	Shortlisted	

== Publications ==
=== Novels ===
- The Night of Wenceslas, 1960
- The Rose of Tibet, 1962
- A Long Way to Shiloh (US title: The Menorah Men), 1966
- Making Good Again, 1968
- Smith's Gazelle, 1971 (cover art by Bill Botten)
- The Sun Chemist, 1976
- The Chelsea Murders, (US title: Murder Games), 1978
- Under Plum Lake, 1980 (children's novel)
- Kolymsky Heights, 1994

=== Novels for young adults published under the pseudonym "David Line" ===
- Soldier and Me (UK title: Run for Your Life), 1965
- Mike and Me, 1974.
- Screaming High, 1985.

=== Short stories ===
- Note to Survivors - first published in Alfred Hitchcock's Mystery Magazine, May 1958
- Where am I Going? Nowhere! - first published in Suspense (London), February 1961
- Indian Rope Trick - first published in Winter’s Crimes 13, London: Macmillan 1981; reprinted in Mysterious Pleasures London: Little, Brown 2003
- I Do Dwell - first published in Winter's Crimes 16, London: Macmillan 1984
- Tuesday's Child - first published in The Verdict of Us All, Crippen & Landru 2006
