= Confessional (television) =

Stylistic device of reality television

A confessional is a stylistic device used in many reality television shows. It is a type of aside, consisting of cutaways to a close-up shot of one (or occasionally more) cast members talking directly to camera. Confessionals are used to provide narration, exposition, and commentary on ongoing action within the show. In small groups, a confessional may provoke a fellow cast member or reveal something about the other cast members from their reactions. They can also be directed at the audience as an appeal to not vote a cast member off of the program. While confessionals are typically presented as an immediate reaction to events in the show (an illusion enforced by the use of the present tense), they are generally filmed later, sometimes much later, and often at another location.

Cutaway interviews have their origin in documentary filmmaking. Confessionals in the modern sense may have begun with The People's Court, in which litigants gave interviews to the court reporter after arguing their case, in the style of post-game interviews. Judge Judy later dropped the court reporter from these interactions, and had litigants speak directly to camera. Confessionals were also used on MTV's The Real World, which debuted in 1992. Beginning in its second season in 1993, cast members had a room in their dwellings where they could record their thoughts on the goings-on of the house, in addition to the standard interviews with producers asking leading questions.

Confessionals have been criticized as a "gimmick" of the reality TV genre that has lost its freshness and purpose, and their introduction to more traditional game shows has been derided.

The confessional device has been deployed in scripted series parodying the reality genre, most notably The Office and Modern Family.
