= Lost Property (Beatty novel) =

2019 novel by Laura Beatty

- First edition
- Author: Laura Beatty
- Language: English
- Publisher: Atlantic Books
- Publication date: 2019
- Publication place: United Kingdom
- Media type: Print
- Pages: 272
- ISBN: 1-7864-9738-7

Lost Property is the third novel of Laura Beatty, first published in 2019 by Atlantic Books.

== Plot introduction ==
A writer despairs over London, so she leaves with her lover Rupert in a clapped-out camper van. The two travel through France, the Mediterranean, Italy, the Balkans, and finally to the Greek island of Chios, where they assist a refugee camp before returning to Britain via Crete. On the way she meets 10,000 years of civilization with many historical figures from Joan of Arc to James Joyce as she questions them on her spiritual journey through Europe.

== Reception ==
Christobel Kent in The Guardian praises the novel, 'this shifting, unsure quality, made luminous with an extraordinary descriptive brilliance, emerges as the book's strength. The narrative is highly wrought but never laboured, and always humanly tentative, as a quest should be. The last thing Lost Property's narrator wants is to be any kind of authority. Rather, she is a receiver, a channel for other voices, other eyes. She stumbles, she forgets, she contrives to be out of earshot when definitive solutions are expounded. And at the journey's end, when she stands on the shore watching the black boats bobbing towards Greece with their shivering cargoes, what is learned through this magical, shapeshifting narrative is the preciousness not of conviction but of uncertainty, if it is shared as part of our common humanity.

== Journey and people ==
- Boulogne-sur-Mer
  - Eustace II
  - Auguste Mariette
- Troyes
  - Henry V
  - Joan of Arc
- Beaune
  - Nicolas Rolin
- Marseille
  - Pierre Puget
- Camargue
  - Folco de Baroncelli-Javon
- Lake Garda
  - Gabriele D'Annunzio
  - Henry Dunant
  - Christine de Pizan
- Ferrara
  - Elisabetta Gonzaga & Isabella d'Este
  - Ludovico Ariosto
- Trieste
  - James Joyce
- Sarajevo
  - Gavrilo Princip
- Lemnos
  - Yannis Ritsos
  - Philoctetes
