= Joanna Traynor =

British writer

Joanna Traynor is a British writer, who is the author of the novels Sister Josephine, Divine and Bitch Money, all published by Bloomsbury, and an educational television producer/writer.

== Biography ==
Traynor was born in London but raised in foster care in Chester. She is of mixed race — her mother was a daughter of Irish immigrants and her father Nigerian.

Traynor's first novel, Sister Josephine, won the Saga Prize in 1996. She described the novel as "a semi-autobiographical account of a foster child on a white northern working class council estate and her experience of hospital life as a nurse in Liverpool. I used my own childhood as a canvas and painted things on it." By 2007, she had developed a multimedia presentation for schools in Devon, UK, to learn about Devon's role in the trans-Atlantic slave trade. This resulted in her winning a Churchill fellowship to the American South, where she conducted further research.

Her second novel, Divine, dealt with the life of a black woman surrounded by drug abuse, confrontation with the law, rejection and rape. Despite the harshness of the situations in which Traynor's characters find themselves, her ear for dialogue registers their humour as well as their resilience. In an interview, Traynor explained how she saw the incident of her characters' lives:

You just run into these things. It's a reflection of society, and that's why they're in my novels. There are always mad things going on in my novels. But not always bad.

Traynor's third novel, Bitch Money, is a crime thriller. She is passionate about writing, communications, technology and relationship counselling.

== Bibliography ==
=== Novels ===
- Sister Josephine (Bloomsbury, 1997)
- Divine (Bloomsbury, 1999)
- Bitch Money (Bloomsbury, 2000)
