= Community Care =

British trade magazine

Community Care is a British trade magazine for the social care industry previously published by Reed Business Information Ltd. From 2017 it is part of the Mark Allen Group.

Community Care was launched in 1974. It is now entirely online. Before 2011, it was a weekly publication with a circulation of 32,000, though less than 4000 were paid for. The last issue of its print edition appeared on 24 November 2011. The magazine claims to list up to 3,000 social care jobs per week.

Community Care is headquartered in Sutton. It runs an annual two-day conference and exhibition under the title Community Care Live.

Community Care won the PPA Business and Professional Magazine of the Year Award in 2003.
