= Ian Macdonald (barrister) =

Scottish barrister (1939–2019)

Ian Macdonald QC
- Born: Ian Alexander Macdonald; 2 January 1939; Glasgow, Scotland
- Died: 12 November 2019 (aged 80); Australia
- Education: Rugby School; Clare College, Cambridge; Middle Temple
- Occupation: Barrister
- Known for: Human rights, immigration law

Ian Alexander Macdonald QC (2 January 1939 – 12 November 2019) was a Scottish barrister who was "a pioneer of committed anti-racist legal practice" in the UK. During the 1970s, he appeared in many notable political and human rights cases, including those involving the Mangrove Nine, the Angry Brigade, and the Balcombe Street siege. He took silk in 1988 and was leader of the British bar in immigration law for five decades until his death at the age of 80.

== Biography ==
Macdonald was born and raised in Glasgow, Scotland, the son of Ian Macdonald, a banker, and his wife, Helen Nicolson. He attended Rugby School, then studied law at Clare College, Cambridge, going on to be called to the bar via Middle Temple in 1963.

He became a member of the Campaign Against Racial Discrimination (CARD) when it began in 1964, lobbying the Labour government for race relations legislation, which resulted in the enactment of the 1968 Race Relations Act and the establishment of the Race Relations Board.

In 1970, Macdonald was instrumental in the successful defence of the Mangrove Nine, a group of British Black activists tried for inciting a riot following a protest against repeated police raids of The Mangrove, a Caribbean restaurant in Notting Hill, west London. He continually challenged the prejudices of the judge, as well as the prosecution and their witnesses, and what amounted to institutional racism in the justice system was given judicial recognition for the first time, including acknowledgement of behaviour (the repeated raids) motivated by racial hatred, rather than legitimate crime control, within the Metropolitan Police. He later wrote in Race Today: "The Mangrove Nine trial was a watershed because we learnt through experience how to confront the power of the court, because the defendants refused to play the role of 'victim' and rely on the so called 'expertise' of the lawyer. Once you recognise the defendant as a self-assertive human being, everything in the court has to change. The power and role of lawyers – the advocacy and the case preparation … What all radical lawyers have to decide is whether they want to retain their slice of the traditional lawyers cake or to participate in a bold new experience."

Macdonald joined what was to become Garden Court Chambers in 1974. He was the author of the textbook that became known as "the immigration practitioners' bible", Macdonald's Immigration Law and Practice, first published in 1983 and in its ninth edition by the time of his death. In 1984, he founded the Immigration Law Practitioners Association, of which he was chair for the next 30 years.

In another landmark case, that in 1981 of the "Bradford 12" – a group of Asian youths charged with manufacturing home-made milk-bottle petrol bombs when faced with attacks by racists from the National Front – Macdonald successfully argued for their acquittal by the jury on the grounds of a community's right to act in collective self-defence.

Following the 1986 fatal stabbing of a 13-year-old Asian pupil by another 13-year-old pupil in the playground of Burnage High School, in what was believed to be a racially motivated attack, Macdonald in 1987 headed an inquiry into racism and violence in Manchester schools, assisted by Gus John, Lily Khan and Reena Bhavnani, with the findings being published as Murder in the Playground: The Burnage Report.

The Institute of Race Relations noted: "Ian's concern for justice led him to activism in the anti-apartheid movement as well as close collaboration with Black feminists and educationalists, and with trades unionists in defence of workers' rights. ... He loved recounting his battles with the establishment – particularly the story of when he applied to become a QC, and the then Lord Chancellor, Lord Hailsham, in whose gift it was, said 'Over my dead body!'" Hailsham ceased to be Lord Chancellor in 1987, having held the post longer than anyone else in the 20th century, and in 1988 Macdonald finally became a QC, "his appointment to silk after 25 years being well overdue", according to Geoffrey Robertson.

In 1996 Macdonald was founder in Manchester of Garden Court North Chambers, committed to upholding "people's rights through justice."

Macdonald was a trustee of the George Padmore Institute (GPI) from its inception in 1991, and collections at the GPI Archives contain detailed evidence of his work, including that related to campaigns by the Black Parents Movement, the Black Youth Movement and Race Today Collective.

Macdonald died on 12 November 2019, aged 80, of a heart attack while on holiday in Australia with his family.

== In popular media ==
Macdonald appears in the 1973 Franco Rosso and John La Rose documentary film The Mangrove Nine.

Actor Jack Lowden portrays Macdonald in the Mangrove episode of Steve McQueen's 2020 film anthology/television miniseries Small Axe. Based on the trial of the Mangrove Nine, the film shows Macdonald representing Barbara Beese during the case, in addition to offering advice to Altheia Jones-LeCointe and Darcus Howe, the two defendants who chose to represent themselves.

Alongside Altheia Jones-LeCointe and Selma James, Macdonald features in the film How the Mangrove Nine Won, a first-hand account of the Mangrove Nine case made in 2016, and launched in November 2020 by Global Women's Strike as a fundraiser for the Haitian Emergency Relief Fund.
