= Rhodan Gordon =

Black British community activist (1939– 2018)

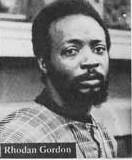
- Born: 9 November 1939; Paradise, Saint Andrew's Parish, Grenada
- Died: 8 May 2018 (aged 78); St George's, Grenada
- Education: Grenada Boys' School
- Occupation: Black British community activist
- Organization: Mangrove Nine

Rhodan Gordon (9 November 1939 – 8 May 2018) was a Black British community activist, who migrated to London from Grenada in the 1960s. He came to public attention in 1970 as one of the nine protestors, known as the Mangrove Nine, arrested and tried on charges that included conspiracy to incite a riot, following a protest against repeated police raids of The Mangrove restaurant in Notting Hill, London. They were all acquitted of the most serious charges and the trial became the first judicial acknowledgement of behaviour (the repeated raids) motivated by racial hatred, rather than legitimate crime control, within the Metropolitan Police.

== Biography ==
Gordon was born in the rural town of Paradise in Saint Andrew's Parish, Grenada, where he attended Grenada Boys' School, before studying agriculture in Trinidad. On graduating, he returned to Grenada, where he worked in government service for 18 months before travelling to Britain in 1960 for further studies.

In the late 1960s, Gordon opened Back-a-yard, a Caribbean café, bookshop and cultural centre at 301–303 Portobello Road in Notting Hill, west London, which like other Black venues would attract police attention. In 1970, he was one of the Mangrove Nine, a group of Black activists tried for inciting a riot at a protest against the police targeting of the Mangrove Restaurant, Notting Hill. The trial lasted 55 days, and the jury deliberated for more than eight hours before all defendants were cleared of the main charge – inciting a riot – with Gordon along with Rupert Boyce, Anthony Innis and Altheia Jones-LeCointe receiving suspended sentences for lesser offences, including affray and assaulting police officers.

Gordon went on to run the Black People's Information Centre on the Portobello Road site of Back-a-yard, intended to improve the rights of and resources available to the Black community, offering free legal advice and helping to defend housing tenants facing discrimination. He also founded the charity Unity Association, on Lancaster Road, which developed into Unity Training Workshop and Unity Restaurant, aiming to give young people vocational skills training. As Amon Saba Saakana has noted: "In 1977 Rhodan was instrumental with others in returning the Notting Hill Carnival to community control when The Notting Hill Carnival Arts Committee was formed and in 1979 was a founder and board member of Notting Hill Carnival Industrial Project training African Caribbean youth in vocational skills relating to carnival arts."

In his last years, Gordon returned regularly to Grenada on family business, and following prolonged ill health he died there while waiting to be moved to a hospital in the island's capital, St George's.

== In media ==
Gordon appears in the 1973 Franco Rosso and John La Rose documentary film The Mangrove Nine.

Actor Nathaniel Martello-White portrays Gordon in Mangrove, an instalment of the 2020 film anthology/television miniseries Small Axe, which was created and directed by Steve McQueen. McQueen's father, Philbert, was a friend of Gordon's since their upbringing in Grenada.
