= Beese =

Beese is a surname. Notable people with the surname include:

- Amelie Beese (1886–1925), German aviator
- Barbara Beese (born 1946), British activist
- Baw Beese (c. 1790 – c. 1850), Potawatomi Indian chief
- Darcus Beese (born 1969), British music executive
- Lorena S. Beese, American biochemist
- Lotte Stam-Beese (1903–1988), German architect and urban planner
