= Universal Coloured People's Association =

Former black power organisation in the UK

Universal Coloured People’s Association
- Abbreviation: UCPA
- Successor: Black Unity and Freedom Party (BUFP)
- Formation: June 5, 1967; 59 years ago
- Founded at: Notting Hill, London
- Dissolved: 26 July 1970; 56 years ago
- Type: Black power organisation
- Region served: United Kingdom
- Key people: Obi Egbuna; Altheia Jones-Lecointe
- Secessions: Universal Coloured People and Arab Association (UCPAAA)
- Funding: Membership fees (5s. on joining, 5d. monthly as of 1968)

The Universal Coloured People's Association (UCPA) was a black power organisation in the United Kingdom from June 1967 to July 1970.

== History ==
The Universal Coloured People's Association (UCPA) was founded on 5 June 1967 at a meeting of 76 members of the Black British community in Notting Hill, London. The UCPA's development as a black power organisation was driven by Stokely Carmichael's July 1967 visit to Britain, where he spoke at the Dialectics of Liberation Congress in London. Just days after Carmichael's visit, Nigerian-born novelist and playwright Obi Egbuna, who had been living in England since 1961, was elected chairman of the association. On 10 September that year, the UCPA launched a pamphlet called Black Power in Britain, the stated purpose of which was "to awake the coloured people of Britain to the lessons of Stokely Carmichael".

Roy Sawh was initially second-in-command of the organisation, but due to disagreements with Obi Egbuna, Sawh and his supporters left the association only a month after its establishment to form a small splinter group called the Universal Coloured People and Arab Association (UCPAAA). Egbuna himself left the association in April 1968 to establish the British Black Panthers; a more hierarchical and disciplined organisation than the UCPA.

Leadership of both UCPA and the British Black Panthers was later taken up by Altheia Jones-Lecointe, who joined the association after earning her Ph.D. She was able to revive both organisations which saw an increase in their membership.

Plagued by in-fighting from its inception, the UCPA split up when most of its members opted to form a new organisation called the Black Unity and Freedom Party (BUFP) on 26 July 1970.

== Ideology ==
As a black power organisation, white people were prohibited from joining the UCPA. However, an association leaflet called "Black Power is Black Unity" defined "black" to include all non-white people, and there were several Asian members including Roy Sawh and Tony Soares. This broad application of the label "black" is known in the UK as political blackness, with "black" intended to act as an antonym to "white" rather than to describe only those of African descent.

Both Marxism-Leninism and pan-Africanism had a significant impact on the UCPA's philosophy. The inclusion of all non-white people as "black" was in line with their conception of imperialism, which declared that the world was being driven into two camps consisting of the imperialist and predominantly white Western powers on the one hand, and those of Asia, Africa, the Caribbean and the Americas on the other. The influence of Marxism-Leninism continued to be central to the UCPA's successor, the Black Unity and Freedom Party (BUFP). Like the BUFP and the British Black Panthers, the UCPA adopted a third-worldist line which dismissed the revolutionary potential of the white working class population due to its indifference to racial prejudice, declaring in 1969 that "Communists are no longer communists. They have become Coloured and White."

== Activities ==
The UCPA set up study groups across the UK, as well as a "Free University for Black Studies".

The largest branch of the association outside London was the Manchester branch, led by Ron Phillips and based in Moss Side.

=== Legal issues ===
Like much of the black power movement, the UCPA and its members were subject to police surveillance and charges of criminal activity. Roy Sawh's speech at Speaker's Corner in which he described black power as the "destruction of the white man’s society" was observed by two Special Branch officers of the Metropolitan Police (Detective Sergeant Francke and Detective Sergeant G. Battye) and the evidence they gathered was used to charge Sawh with "incitement to racial hatred" under the Race Relations Act 1965. Obi Egbuna was also arrested on charges of threatening police, for which he was found guilty.

== See also ==
- League of Coloured Peoples, a civil rights organisation active 1931-1951
- Forever Family, anti-racism organisation established in 2020
- Black Equity Organisation, a black civil rights organisation formed in 2022
