= British Black Panthers =

Black Power organisation in the United Kingdom

The British Black Panthers (BBP) or the Black Panther Movement (BPM) was a Black Power organisation in the United Kingdom that fought for the rights of black people and racial minorities in the country, founded in 1968. The BBP were inspired by the US Black Panther Party, though they were unaffiliated with them. The British Panthers adopted the principle of political blackness, which included activists of black as well as South Asian origin.

The movement reached its pinnacle with the 1970 Mangrove Nine Trial. The trial, involving members of the Panther Movement and other black activists, succeeded in fighting against police harassment of Frank Crichlow's Mangrove restaurant. The movement renamed itself the Black Workers' Movement in 1973.

== About ==
The BBP worked to educate black people, fight against racial discrimination, and raise awareness of black history across Britain. They particularly fought against police brutality in the UK and "emphasized their own preparedness and willingness to confront police when necessary." The BPM also opposed the Immigration Act 1971, defended communities against fascist violence, held civil rights demonstrations, and supported Caribbean and Palestinian liberation struggles. Based on a model of political blackness, both Black British and South Asian activists were involved with the group. The BBP used imagery and symbols already established by the Black Panther Party in the United States.

Several branches existed, but the main centre of the organisation was in Brixton, South London. The BBP also had a Youth League. Headquarters, at 38 Shakespeare Road, were purchased with a donation from writer John Berger (half of his 1972 Booker Prize award for the novel G.). The BBP published its own newspaper called Freedom News, and other publications such as Black Power Speaks (1968) and Black People's News Service (1970).

Neil Kenlock, a Jamaican-born photographer, was a member of the BBP and documented their activities.

== History ==
The Black Panther Movement formed out of the radical black politics developing in Britain in the 1950s and '60s, which included many Caribbean and African immigrants whose own countries were going through a stage of 'secondary decolonisation'. Nigerian writer and Antiuniversity of London teacher Obi Egbuna founded the country's first Black Power organisation, the Universal Coloured People's Association (UCPA), and visited the United States in 1966 to learn about the Black Power movement there. He gained national focus after publishing his own Black Power manifesto.

On Sunday 23 July 1967, Egbuna introduced Stokely Carmichael's address at the Dialectics of Liberation Congress at the Roundhouse in London. Inspired by the speech and the publicity it generated, Egubuna, Darcus Howe, Linton Kwesi Johnson and Olive Morris formed the British Black Power Movement in the summer of 1968, with Egbuna as the leader. Other early members included Altheia Jones-LeCointe, as well as South Asian activists such as Farrukh Dhondy and Mala Sen. The organisation operated under the banner of political blackness, with "black" serving as a political label for all people of colour.

=== Name change ===
Egbuna was arrested and was convicted in December 1968 on the charge of a conspiracy to murder police officers because of an essay he wrote about resisting police violence. The arrest attracted negative media attention calling the group's members "black racialists" and "extremists." After Egbuna, Altheia Jones-LeCointe took his place as leader of the movement. Around 1969, inspired by the Black Panther newspaper and BBC news reports of the US Black Panthers, the organisation changed its name to the British Black Panthers.

In 1969, the Race Today political magazine was founded by the Race Today Collective, becoming a leading organ for Black and Asian politics in 1970s' Britain. It was founded by BPM members including Howe, Dhondy, Kwesi Johnson, and Sen.

The growth of the organisation was slow, but by the early 1970s, they were "firmly ensconced in Britain's left political culture," and there were around 3,000 members. In March 1970, about 300 BBP members demonstrated in front of the American Embassy in Grosvenor Square to protest against the treatment of the American Black Panthers.

=== Mangrove Nine ===
On 9 August 1970, 150 protesters involved with the BBP demonstrated against the constant police raids on the Mangrove, a black-owned restaurant in Ladbroke Grove, a West Indian neighbourhood in west London. There were 700 police involved, and violence and arrests took place. In addition to the police, a Special Branch "black power desk" monitored the protest.

Nineteen members of the BBP were arrested, though later the charges against 10 were dropped. The remaining individuals, who became known as the "Mangrove Nine", chose to either defend themselves or have "radical barrister" Ian McDonald represent them, and requested all-black juries, citing the Magna Carta as precedent. All members of the Mangrove Nine were later found not-guilty by the jury.

The Black Panther Movement were under extensive State surveillance by the Special Branch's "Black Power Desk". Top-secret documents were uncovered by Robin Bunce and Paul Field while writing their political biography of Darcus Howe. The state sought to end the Black Power movement and imprison leading figures within the BPM.

=== Disbanding ===
The group was eventually renamed the Black Workers' Movement in 1973, since several of its founding members believed it should focus on a more class-based approach. Others went on to form breakaway groups. According to The Observer, the movement eventually "collapsed amid infighting, power struggles and 'kangaroo courts'".

== Impact ==
Actions and educational efforts by the BBP helped expose racism in schools and in the government. The trial of the Mangrove Nine drew attention to the fight against racism in the UK police force. Robin Bunce, a biographer of Howe, said: "He basically turned it into a trial of the Police.... His defence appealed to Magna Carta, and the media loved it because it was rooted in English traditions of fair play, but was also enormously radical and subversively funny."

As the BBP began to fall apart in 1973, a number of women including Beverley Bryan, Olive Morris and Liz Obi organised to form the Brixton Black Women's Group in Brixton.

In recent years, Kenlock's photographs of the BPM have been featured in exhibitions and other media. A 2013 project by Brixton arts organisation Photofusion conducted oral histories interviews with a number of members and held an exhibition of Kenlock's photographs of the BPM curated by young people. Tate Britain's 2017 display Stan Firm Inna Inglan: Black Diaspora in London, 1960–70s, featured photographers, including Kenlock, who captured the experiences of black people during that time.

A television drama miniseries, Guerrilla (2017), explores the British Black Panthers movement in the early 1970s. However, American magazine Ebony criticised the series for not representing black women in leadership roles in the black power movement of the UK. There has also been some controversy over Freida Pinto's casting as a female lead, which has been defended as historically appropriate by early British Black Panther members, Farrukh Dhondy and Neil Kenlock, noting the central role of British Asians in the movement, including Asian women such as Mala Sen, who inspired Pinto's character.

== Notable members ==
- Barbara Beese
- Beverley Bryan
- Sunit Chopra
- Farrukh Dhondy
- Obi Egbuna
- Darcus Howe
- Linton Kwesi Johnson
- Neil Kenlock
- Altheia Jones-LeCointe
- Olive Morris
- Liz Obi
- Mala Sen
- Vivan Sundaram
- David Udo

== See also ==
- Black panther (disambiguation)#Political organisations
- Forever Family (UK)
