= Barbara Beese =

British activist and writer (born 1946)

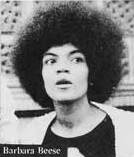
- Born: 2 January 1946 (age 80)
- Occupations: Activist and writer
- Known for: Member of the British Black Panthers and one of the Mangrove Nine
- Partner: Darcus Howe
- Children: Darcus Beese

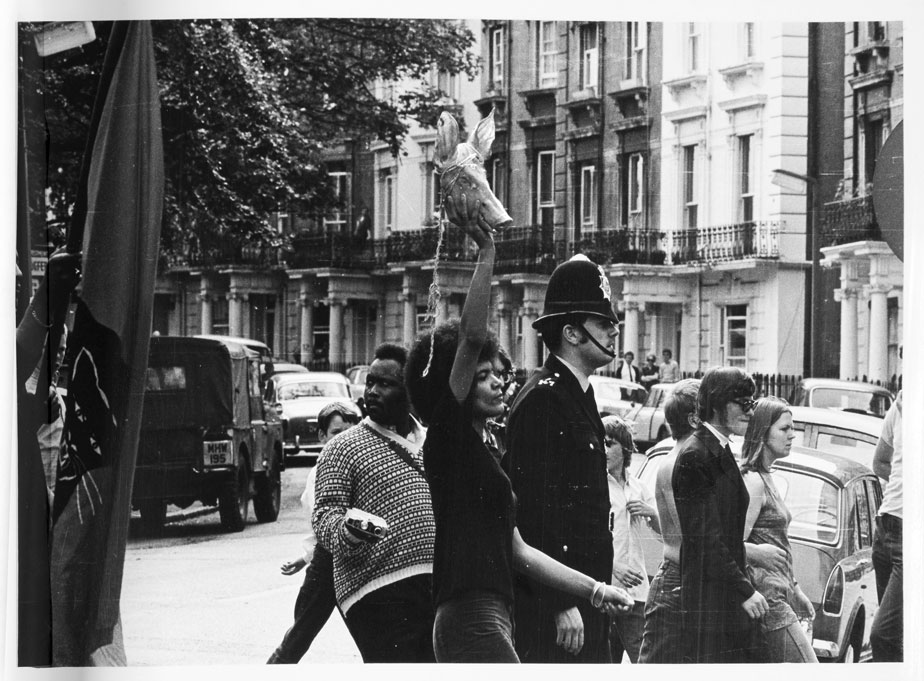
Beese during the Mangrove Nine demonstration of 9 August 1970

Barbara Beese (/ˈbiːz/; born 2 January 1946) is a British activist, writer, and former member of the British Black Panthers. She is most notable as one of the Black activists known as the Mangrove Nine, charged in 1970 with inciting a riot, following a protest against repeated police raids of The Mangrove, a Caribbean restaurant in Notting Hill, west London. They were all acquitted of the most serious charges and the trial became the first judicial acknowledgement of behaviour (the repeated raids) motivated by racial hatred, rather than legitimate crime control, within the Metropolitan Police.

== Black Panthers and activism ==
Beese came to public attention in 1970 as one of the Mangrove Nine, who on 9 August that year marched to the police station in Notting Hill, London, to protest against police raids of The Mangrove, a restaurant run by Frank Crichlow, which was a meeting place for the Black community in the area. Violent clashes between the police and the Black marchers led to charges and an important trial that is said to have "changed racial justice in the UK forever". Beese was one of those arrested and charged on a number of counts, and she was found not guilty of all charges.

She contributed to the journal Race Today on a number of topics, including education.

== Personal life ==
Beese had a relationship with fellow British Black Panther and Mangrove Nine activist Darcus Howe, with whom she had a son, Darcus Beese.

== In popular media ==
Beese appears in the 1973 Franco Rosso and John La Rose documentary film The Mangrove Nine.

Actress Rochenda Sandall portrays Beese in the Mangrove episode of Steve McQueen's 2020 film anthology/television miniseries Small Axe.

== See also ==
- Altheia Jones-LeCointe
