= Altheia Jones-LeCointe =

Trinidadian physician and research scientist (born 1945)

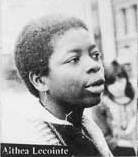
- Born: Altheia Jones; 9 January 1945 (age 81); Trinidad and Tobago
- Education: University College London (PhD)
- Occupations: Physician and research scientist
- Known for: Leader of the British Black Panther movement
- Spouse: Eddie LeCointe

Altheia Jones-LeCointe (born 9 January 1945) is a Trinidadian physician and research scientist also known for her role as a leader of the British Black Panther Movement of the 1960s and 1970s. Jones-LeCointe came to public attention in 1970 as one of the nine protestors, known as the Mangrove Nine, arrested and tried on charges that included conspiracy to incite a riot, following a protest against repeated police raids of The Mangrove restaurant in Notting Hill, London. They were all acquitted of the most serious charges and the trial became the first judicial acknowledgement of behaviour (the repeated raids) motivated by racial hatred, rather than legitimate crime control, within the Metropolitan Police.

== Early life and education ==
Born Altheia Jones in 1945 in Port of Spain, Trinidad, she was one of the three daughters of Viola Jones, a Port of Spain dressmaker and clothes shop proprietor, and Dunstan Jones, the principal of a government school. Her parents also held local leadership roles in the People's National Movement during her childhood. She attended St George's College in Barataria, where she was regarded by her chemistry teacher as "a vibrant, sparkling girl of exceptional ability". In 1965, she left Trinidad to complete a PhD in biochemistry at University College London.

== Political activism ==
While studying in London, Jones-LeCointe became involved in community organising against racism and for the rights of people of African and Asian heritage in the UK. She worked as a teacher and organiser in the Universal Coloured People's Association (UCPA).

=== Leadership of the British Black Panther Movement ===
After the arrest and departure of Obi Egbuna in 1968, Jones-LeCointe became a central and leading figure of the British Black Panther Movement. She recruited a central core of activists into the movement, including Darcus Howe and Eddie LeCointe. Eddie LeCointe, her husband, was also a leading figure of the British Black Panther Movement.

Jones-LeCointe was a Panther teacher; she spoke at schools and taught classes in anti-colonialism. Poet Linton Kwesi Johnson joined the Black Panther Youth league after seeing Jones-LeCointe debate at his sixth-form. In an interview with The Guardian, Johnson describes Jones-LeCointe as "perhaps the most remarkable woman I've ever met".

==== Notable achievements ====
Jones-LeCointe played a key role in ensuring that defending black women and girls was at the core of the movement. This included building structures into the organisation to ensure that men suspected of the abuse or exploitation of women were interrogated and punished if found guilty. W. Chris Johnson, writing in Gender, Imperialism and Global Exchanges (edited by Miescher, Mitchell and Shibusawa, 2015), states: "Jones-LeCointe's authority, and her energetic pursuit of justice, unsettled Panthers who did not see anti-sexism as an intrinsic part of revolutionary praxis."

Under her leadership, the Panthers' influence and reach in the community increased considerably. They produced a newspaper, Freedom News; led campaigns against police brutality and discrimination in employment, housing and education; and ran sessions to encourage black people to study books by radical authors. By the 1970s, Jones-LeCointe had led the recruitment of more than 3,000 people to the British Black Panther Movement.

==== Influence and impact ====
Jones-LeCointe is considered by academics and her contemporaries to be the leader of the British Black Panther Movement. According to the British Black Panthers' official photographer Neil Kenlock: "Althea (sic) never called herself the leader, but she led us." Jones-LeCointe says: "I don't know how I've suddenly become 'a leader,'" she recalls, "we didn't recognize those categories ... we believed in collective leadership."

As part of the Mangrove Nine, Jones-LeCointe and her fellow activists successfully defended themselves and for the first time, spoke about racism in the Metropolitan Police on an official platform – the courtroom. Their arguments and their win, led to the formation of the notable 1976 Race Relations Act.

=== The Mangrove Nine ===
Jones-LeCointe was one of the nine protesters arrested and tried in what has since been described as "Britain's most influential black power trial", and by Bryan Knight of The Guardian as "one [of] the most significant legal cases in British history."

In 1969 and 1970, The Mangrove restaurant in Notting Hill became the target of repeated police raids. The police claimed the restaurant was a hub for criminal activity, despite a lack of evidence found. A march was organised by local Panthers and community leaders to demand police get their "hands off The Mangrove".

==== The March ====
On Sunday, 9 August 1970, an estimated 150 people took part in the protest. Jones-LeCointe and Howe addressed the demonstrators outside the restaurant. Jones-LeCointe spoke on community self-help and rights for British citizens.

The protesters were flanked and monitored by hundreds of police officers, with the estimated number of police officers ranging from 200 to 700. The heavy-handed policing led to clashes in the crowd.

During the march, Jones-LeCointe was coming to the aid of an injured woman when she was seized by three police constables and carried to a van.

==== The trial ====
Jones-LeCointe and Howe made the decision to represent themselves in the trial. They also argued for an all-black jury to deliberate on the case — however, this was denied. Nonetheless, the Mangrove Nine successfully rooted their defending arguments in class struggle and thereby showed that they had a shared struggle with the British working class against institutionally oppressive government structures. In her closing speech, Jones-LeCointe pointed out the persecution of the black community by the police in Notting Hill.

In December 1971, the jury found the defendants not guilty of the most serious charge of conspiracy to incite a riot, which marked a turning point for racial justice in the UK and the recognition of systemic racism within British institutions. Jones-LeCointe and three others were convicted of assault. The jury asked for more lenient sentencing as Jones-LeCointe was pregnant. Judge Clarke suspended the sentences.

== Depiction in the media ==
Jones-LeCointe appears in the 1973 Franco Rosso and John La Rose documentary film The Mangrove Nine.

In 2017, Jones-LeCointe's role in the British Black Panther Movement gained renewed interest following the release of Sky Atlantic drama miniseries Guerrilla, inspired by the emergence of British Black Power.

Guyanese/English actress Letitia Wright portrays Jones-LeCointe in the Mangrove episode of Steve McQueen's 2020 film anthology/television miniseries Small Axe.

Alongside Ian Macdonald QC – as well as Selma James, who was a witness in the Mangrove Nine case – Jones-LeCointe features in the documentary How the Mangrove Nine Won, a first-hand account of the case, filmed in 2016 and launched in November 2020 by Global Women's Strike as a fundraiser for the Haitian Emergency Relief Fund.

== Medical career ==
Jones-LeCointe is a medical researcher and practises as a haematologist in Britain and Trinidad.
