= Frank Crichlow =

British community activist and civil rights campaigner (1932–2010)

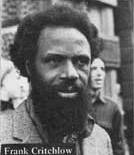
- Born: Frank Gilbert Crichlow; 13 July 1932; Woodbrook, Port of Spain, Trinidad and Tobago
- Died: 15 September 2010 (aged 78); London, England
- Occupation: Community activist
- Known for: The Mangrove restaurant
- Children: 4, inc. Lenora Crichlow

Frank Gilbert Crichlow (13 July 1932 – 15 September 2010) was a British community activist and civil rights campaigner, who became known in 1960s London as a godfather of black power activism. He was a central figure in the Notting Hill Carnival. His restaurant, The Mangrove in All Saints Road, served for many years as the base from which activists, musicians, and artists organised the event.

Crichlow was one of the Black activists known as the Mangrove Nine, who were charged in 1970 with inciting a riot following a protest against repeated police raids of The Mangrove restaurant. The defendants were all acquitted of the most serious charges and the trial became the first judicial acknowledgement of behaviour (the repeated raids) motivated by racial hatred, rather than legitimate crime control, within the Metropolitan Police.

== Early life and emigration to UK ==
Originally from Woodbrook, Port of Spain, Trinidad, Frank Crichlow arrived in England in June 1953 on the SS Colombie, among the first wave of post-war immigrants from the Caribbean. He lived in Paddington at first, working for British Rail, then formed the Starlight Four band in 1956. Margaret Busby writes in The Guardian that the band had a few television and radio appearances, which, by 1959, gave Crichlow enough money to open the El Rio cafe in Notting Hill at 127 Westbourne Park Road. The cafe became a fashionable meeting place — with people such as model Christine Keeler and politician John Profumo as customers — and provided a safe place for black people to meet. Crichlow described it as a "school or university" for hustlers.

== The Mangrove and civil rights activism ==
In 1968, Crichlow opened The Mangrove restaurant at 8 All Saints Road, Notting Hill, attracting both unwelcome police attention and celebrity visitors such as Diana Ross and the Supremes, Vanessa Redgrave, and Sammy Davis Jr. The restaurant was raided six times in the first year, though nothing was found. Crichlow, Darcus Howe, and several others marched on the police station in 1970 in protest against the constant police attention. The Mangrove Nine, as they became known, faced charges of incitement to riot. Although the charges were initially dismissed, they were later reinstated, and all nine were arrested in morning police raids. The Nine defendants unsuccessfully argued for an all-black jury, on the grounds that Magna Carta afforded them a "jury of one's peers". After a 55-day trial that made national headlines in late 1971, all of the Nine were acquitted on Thursday, 16 December 1971. Crichlow called the trial "a turning point for black people".

Crichlow went on to form the Mangrove Community Association to improve housing and services for ex-offenders, drug addicts, and alcoholics. He was also a central figure in the Notting Hill Carnival; his restaurant served for many years as the base from which activists, musicians and artists organised the event.

Despite being well known locally for his anti-drug stance — Heather Mills writes in The Independent that the local joke about him was that "his education is lacking: he's the only Trinidadian who doesn't know what a great draw of ganja is" — Crichlow was charged with drug offences in 1979 but was subsequently cleared of the charges. In 1988, police used sledgehammers to break into The Mangrove, searching for drugs, after hiding in a freight container outside the restaurant, from where they launched the raid. Charged with possession of heroin and cannabis, which he said the police had planted, Crichlow was defended by Gareth Peirce, Michael Mansfield, and Courtenay Griffiths. Crichlow was again acquitted, receiving £50,000 damages from the Metropolitan Police in 1992 for false imprisonment, battery and malicious prosecution.

Abner Cohen, writing in 1993, stated that, although Crichlow was never a "leader" in any formal sense, never sought any important office, and was a "shy, diffident" person, he had nevertheless been "one of the most significant West Indian leaders in Britain during the 1970s and 1980s. His role in the Notting Hill Carnival was paramount. [...] What was astonishing about Crichlow was that he did not give up. During twenty turbulent years, he made the Mangrove into a potent symbol of black unity, defiance and resistance." Continuing his activism beyond the closure of The Mangrove, until his death, Crichlow himself said: "As I see it I stood up for my rights and a lot of people identified with that."

== Personal life and death ==
Crichlow and his partner, Lucy Addington, had a son and three daughters, including Lenora.

Crichlow died of prostate cancer in 2010, aged 78. His funeral took place on 27 September 2010 at St Mary of the Angels, Bayswater.

== In popular media and legacy ==
Crichlow appeared in the 1973 Franco Rosso and John La Rose documentary film The Mangrove Nine.

In 2011, a blue plaque for Crichlow organised by the Nubian Jak Community Trust was unveiled at the former site of The Mangrove in All Saints Road.

Actor Shaun Parkes portrays Crichlow in the Mangrove episode of Steve McQueen's 2020 film anthology/television miniseries Small Axe.

== See also ==
- SS Empire Windrush
- 1958 Notting Hill race riots
- Darcus Howe
