= Darcus =

Darcus is a given name. Notable people with the name include:

- Darcus Beese (born 1969), British music executive
- Darcus Howe (1943–2017), British broadcaster, writer and activist

== See also ==
- Jack Darcus (born 1941), Canadian film director, screenwriter and painter
