= Joel Harrison (author) =

British/Norwegian journalist

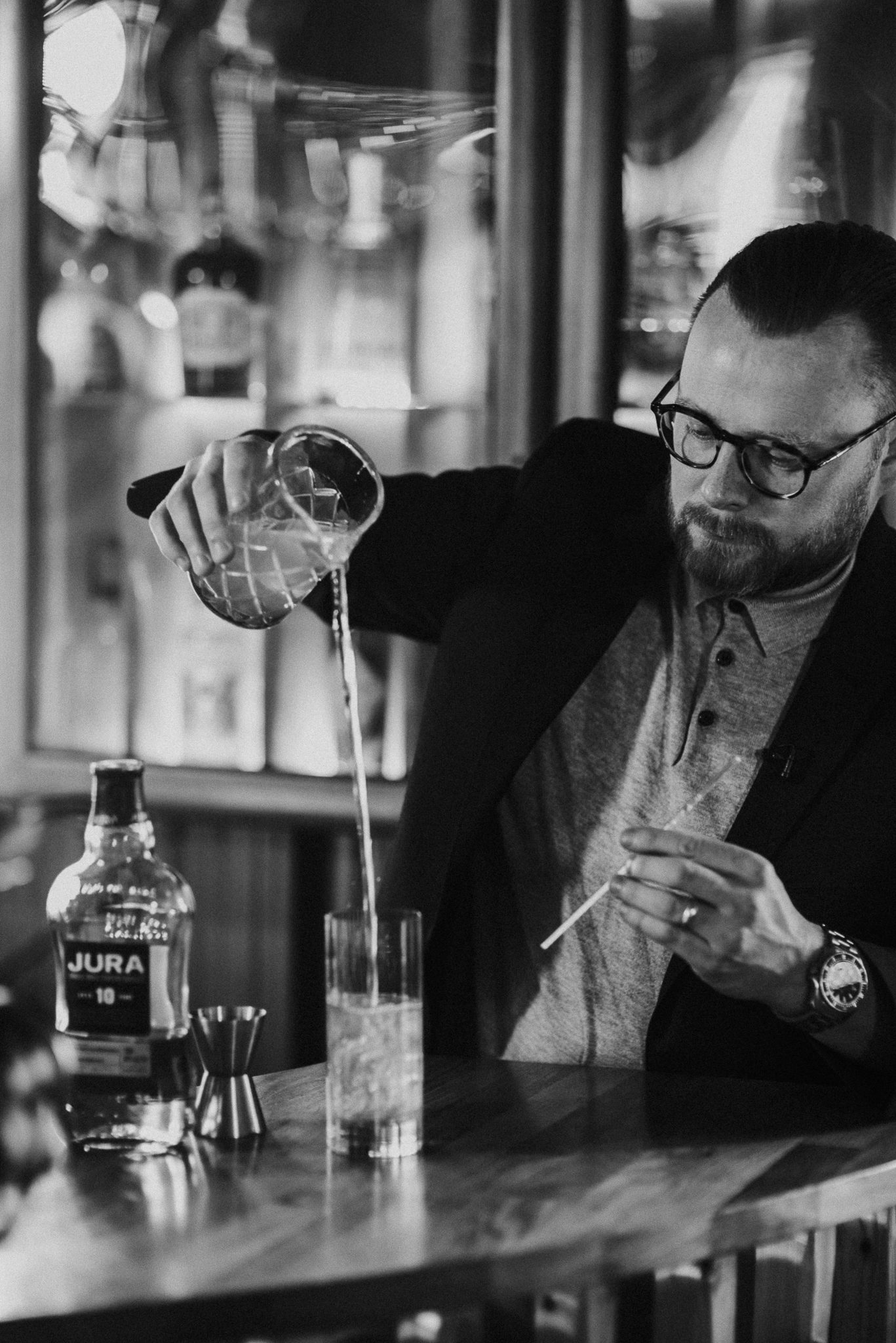
- Joel Harrison makes a cocktail using single malt Scotch whisky
- Born: Joel Harrison; 28 November 1979 (age 46); Oxford, Oxfordshire
- Education: University of Westminster, London
- Occupations: Whisky And Fine Spirits Writer and Presenter

Joel Harrison (born 28 November 1979) is a British/Norwegian whisky and fine spirits writer, focusing on whisky, gin, vodka, brandy and rum. He is best known for his writing work, such as the Fortnum and Mason food and drink award-winning book Distilled which has been published in nine languages around the world, as well as his appearances on TV Shows such as Channel 4 Sunday Brunch where he regularly features discussing drinks with his business and writing partner Neil Ridley.

== Life ==
Harrison was born in Oxford, Oxfordshire, UK

== Music ==
After collecting records from an early age, Harrison started a small record label, Richly Comic Records in his home town of Oxford, inspired by other start-ups such as Shifty Disco and Fierce Panda. This opened the door for Harrison to the music industry, and his label's breakthrough record was with the Manchester-based band Longview, who released a critically acclaimed single on Richly Comic Records. Harrison eventually took a role in Artists and repertoire at Island Records, where he spent seven years from 2000 - 2007 eventually reporting into Darcus Beese.

== Drinks writing and presenting work ==
During his time at Island Records, Harrison became increasingly interested in Scotch whisky, visiting as many distilleries as he could. In 2007, along with his now long-term writing partner and ex-A&R friend Neil Ridley, they set up one of the first whisky blogs (along with the well established WhiskyFun.com, and the now defunct Dr. Whisky), Caskstrength.net.

The success of their blog, its unique content, and approach to whisky won it many plaudits, as well as awards. Harrison and Ridley were approached to write for traditional print media on the subject of whisky, including Whisky Magazine, The Independent and The Telegraph. From 2011 to 2015 Harrison held the role of Drinks Editor at the newspaper Mint in India, writing from his home in London for their Indian readership. The duo eventually closed their blog on 1 April 2015 to focus on professional writing and presenting projects under the banner of 'World's Best Spirits'.

On 6 October 2014 Harrison and Ridley's debut book Distilled was released by the publishing house Mitchell Beazley where they signed a deal directly with the Group Publishing Director. In 2015 Distilled won the Fortnum & Mason Food and Drink Awards Drinks Book of the Year and the book can now be found in nine languages including Swedish, German, Complex Chinese, Korean, Slovak and Spanish.

Harrison and Ridley's second book for Mitchell Beazley, Straight Up, was a guide to drinking around the world due for release in the UK and US in October 2017.

Their third book, The World Atlas of Gin, was released to much acclaim on Sept 5th 2019 and won a gold medal for the German-language edition at The German Gastronomy Academy Awards.

Together Harrison and Ridley wrote ‘London Spirit: The Story of Beefeater Gin’, released in 2021.

In 2022 their fourth book on Mitchell Beazley, ‘60-Second Cocktails’ was released, also finding an outlet through Princetown Architectural Press in the USA and on ZS Verlag in German-speaking countries.

Harrison regularly appears on Channel 4's Sunday morning food and drink show Sunday Brunch with his writing partner Neil Ridley as the drinks experts, serving cocktails and enjoying chat with the hosts and celebrity guests. In 2016 Harrison took part in the filming of a new Channel 4 television show with Michel Roux Jr as the drinks expert, appearing in the studio as well as filming in Scotland and the USA. The show, not then named, was due to air in the UK in May 2017

Harrison counts these selected magazines and newspapers in his list of published works: Olive, Waitrose Magazine, Grazia, The Sunday Telegraph, The Daily Telegraph, The Independent and Whisky Magazine in the UK, France and Hong Kong.

== Event hosting ==
Over the last ten years Harrison has hosted many whisky, gin, rum and vodka tastings across the world, most recently in Stockholm, Sweden. Along with Neil Ridley, Harrison regularly hosts the Telegraph Gin Experience and the Telegraphy Whisky Experience for the Telegraph Media Group.

== Other work and awards ==
As well as writing and broadcasting on distilled drinks, Harrison is a chair judge at the International Wine and Spirit Competition and works as a creative consultant and copywriter through his business Caskstrength Creative to drinks brands around the world. In 2013 Harrison was made a Keeper of the Quaich, the highest honour in Scotch whisky, in 2017 was made a member of the Compagnie des Mousquetaires d’Armagnac for his work in brandy, and in 2019 was admitted to the Gin Guild. Harrison was made a Freeman of the City of London, and made a Liveryman, in 2021, joining The Worshipful Company of Distillers.

== Selected bibliography ==
- Harrison, Joel and Ridley, Neil 'Distilled' ISBN 978-1845339111
- Harrison, Joel and Ridley, Neil 'Straight Up' ISBN 978-1784722739
- Harrison, Joel and Ridley, Neil '60-Second Cocktails' ISBN 978-1784728366
