= Mangrove (film) =

2020 film of Small Axe anthology film series

- Poster for Amazon Prime Video release
- Directed by: Steve McQueen
- Screenplay by: Steve McQueen; Alastair Siddons
- Produced by: Anita Overland; Michael Elliott
- Starring: Letitia Wright; Shaun Parkes; Malachi Kirby; Rochenda Sandall; Alex Jennings; Jack Lowden
- Cinematography: Shabier Kirchner
- Edited by: Chris Dickens; Steve McQueen
- Music by: Mica Levi
- Production companies: BBC Studios; BBC Films; Turbine Studios; Lammas Park; Amazon Studios; EMU Films; Six Temple Productions
- Distributed by: BBC One; Amazon Prime Video
- Release dates: 24 September 2020 (NYFF); 15 November 2020 (United Kingdom); 20 November 2020 (United States)
- Running time: 128 minutes
- Countries: United Kingdom; United States
- Language: English

Mangrove is a 2020 historical legal drama film directed by British director Steve McQueen and co-written by McQueen and Alastair Siddons, about the Mangrove restaurant in west London and the 1971 trial of the Mangrove Nine. It stars Letitia Wright, Shaun Parkes, Malachi Kirby, Rochenda Sandall, Alex Jennings and Jack Lowden.

The film was released as part of the anthology series Small Axe on BBC One on 15 November 2020 and Amazon Prime Video on 20 November 2020. It premiered as the opening film at the 58th New York Film Festival on 24 September 2020.

== Plot ==
Frank Crichlow is a Trinidadian immigrant opening a new restaurant, the Mangrove, in Notting Hill in the late 1960s. Notting Hill was then a Caribbean immigrant neighbourhood. On opening night Constable Frank Pulley looks on and comments to a fellow constable that Black people must be kept in their place.

After the restaurant closes for the night, Pulley aggressively confronts Crichlow and accuses him of running an establishment frequented by drug dealers, gamblers, and prostitutes. Thereafter, Pulley conducts a series of violent raids on the Mangrove, driving Crichlow to financial distress.

The neighbourhood rallies in support of the Mangrove and a march is organised to protest police conduct. The police surround the protesters and provoke violence. A number of protesters are immediately brought up on minor charges including Frank Crichlow, British-born activist Barbara Beese, Trinidadian Black Panther leader Altheia Jones-LeCointe, Trinidadian activist Darcus Howe, Rhodan Gordon, Anthony Carlisle Innis, Rothwell Kentish, Rupert Boyce, and Godfrey Millett. A year later those protesters – the Mangrove Nine – are charged with the serious crimes of riot and affray.

At their 1970 trial the Mangrove Nine make race an issue, asking for an all Black jury. The presiding judge, Judge Edward Clarke, declines the request and refuses to give justification. The defendants use their right to challenge White jury members several times, and the prosecutors challenge black jury members. As witnesses give their testimony, Judge Clarke plainly gives preferential treatment to the prosecution. Jones-LeCointe and Howe, representing themselves, point out fabrications in Pulley's testimony and flaws in the medical examiner's testimony. Pulley attempts to feed answers to policeman Royce while he is in the witness-box, resulting in Pulley's expulsion from the courtroom until his fellow policemen have given their testimony. Barbara Beese then interrupts a witness policeman's gleaming introduction by chanting "the officer has nothing to do with the case" and is soon joined by the other defendants and observers. Judge Clarke reprimands the defendants and observers for disrupting the proceedings and launches an adjournment so emotions can settle. Crichlow and Howe are roughly dragged out of the court box by court officers and thrown into solitary basement cells for disruption. Upon pushback from defending counsels Ian Macdonald and Mr. Croft, Judge Clarke replaces all court officers.

Crichlow is advised by his counsel, Mr. Croft, to plead guilty and abandon his fellow defendants to their own sentences. Crichlow pleads innocent after Jones-LeCointe objects and reveals she is pregnant. The jury acquits Crichlow, Howe, and three other defendants. The judge, commenting that there was evidence of racial prejudice on both sides, gives lenient sentences to the four who were convicted.

== Cast ==
- Letitia Wright as Altheia Jones-LeCointe
- Malachi Kirby as Darcus Howe
- Shaun Parkes as Frank Crichlow
- Rochenda Sandall as Barbara Beese
- Nathaniel Martello-White as Rhodan Gordon
- Darren Braithwaite as Anthony Carlisle Innis
- Richie Campbell as Rothwell Kentish
- Duane Facey-Pearson as Rupert Boyce
- Jumayn Hunter as Godfrey Millett
- Jack Lowden as Ian Macdonald
- Sam Spruell as Police Constable Frank Pulley
- Alex Jennings as Judge Edward Clarke
- Samuel West as Mr. Hill, prosecuting barrister
- Gershwyn Eustache Jr. as Eddie LeCointe
- Gary Beadle as Dolston Isaacs
- Richard Cordery as Mr. Croft
- Derek Griffiths as C. L. R. James
- Jodhi May as Selma James
- Llewella Gideon as Aunt Betty
- Thomas Coombes as PC Royce
- Joseph Quinn as PC Dixon
- Tahj Miles as Kendrick Manning
- Michelle Greenidge as Mrs. Manning
- Joe Tucker as Court Officer
- James Hillier as the police Chief Inspector
- Stephen O'Neill as the Magistrate
- Ben Caplan as Mr. Stedman
- Stefan Kalipha as the card player
- Jay Simpson as the Duty Officer
- Doreen Ingleton as Mrs. Tetley
- Akbar Kurtha as Dr Chadee
- Shem Hamilton as Benson
- Tayo Jarrett as Linton
- Tyrone Huggins as Granville
- Tahj Miles as Kendrick Manning

=== Casting ===
Shaun Parkes was cast as Frank Crichlow, owner of the Mangrove restaurant, and Malachi Kirby was cast as Darcus Howe, an activist and member of the Mangrove Nine, after auditions. Wright was cast as Altheia Jones-LeCointe, a leader of the British Black Panthers and one of the Mangrove Nine, after a meeting with McQueen and casting director Gary Davy. Wright had been unaware of the Mangrove Nine before being approached for the film, saying in an interview with the New York Times that "it's not in the textbooks at school. The stronghold of Black History Month in the U.K. [held in October] is American history ... You have mostly — and I honor and respect them always — Martin Luther King and Malcolm X on the posters, but you don't have the Altheias."

== Production ==
Steve McQueen began developing the Small Axe anthology series in the early 2010s, and while it was initially conceived as a serialized story, he decided to pursue an anthology of distinct films. Mangrove is the longest film in the series and was released as the first of the anthology. Cast member Letitia Wright recalled that McQueen said he chose to tell this story because "The window for our elders' stories to be told is closing. We can't allow them to pass away and become our ancestors without them seeing themselves, their culture and everything they've contributed to the country represented onscreen."

== Release ==
The film was selected for the 2020 Cannes Film Festival alongside Lovers Rock, but the Festival was canceled due to the COVID-19 pandemic. The film later premiered at the 2020 New York Film Festival, which was held virtually, alongside Lovers Rock and Red, White and Blue. It was the opening film at the 64th BFI London Film Festival on 7 October 2020. It premiered on BBC One and became available for streaming on BBC iPlayer in the United Kingdom on 15 November 2020, and became available for streaming on Amazon Prime Video in the United States on 20 November.

== Critical reception ==
Review aggregator Metacritic assigned the film a weighted average score of 90 out of 100, based on 27 critics, indicating "universal acclaim". On Rotten Tomatoes the film holds an approval rating of 99% based on 147 reviews, with an average rating of 8.85/10. The site's critics consensus reads, "Anchored by strong performances and an even stronger sense of conviction, Mangrove is a powerful indictment of institutional racism."

K. Austin Collins of Rolling Stone commended the film's depiction of community life at the Mangrove restaurant, writing that "the power of Mangrove is in precisely the details that give us this impression, often without us even noticing. There's something stealthy in its awareness, in the ways it accrues crumbs of insight and observation and dispenses them throughout the narrative without us even noticing. You emerge from the movie with an enriched, nearly felt sense of the Mangrove as a place, not just as a symbol."

Peter Bradshaw of The Guardian positively reviewed the courtroom drama elements of the film, writing that "Mangrove is clear-sighted and genuinely passionate with performances which are straight from the heart. You are plunged right back into a situation where really dangerous issues are really at stake, and where at any time Crichlow might be tempted to sell out his co-defendants by taking a guilty plea." Bradshaw and several other critics compared the film favorably to another 2020 courtroom drama film, The Trial of the Chicago 7.

Paul Gilroy, a Black British writer and historian, commended the Small Axe series in an interview with The Guardian, saying, "What's exciting about Steve's films, the Mangrove one in particular, is that they are an attempt to offer a historical transfusion that, in the present condition, can give younger viewers and mainstream viewers an alternative sense of what the history of this country might be over the last 50 years."

The film appeared on several critics' top ten lists of best films from 2020.
