= Letitia Wright =

British actress (born 1993)

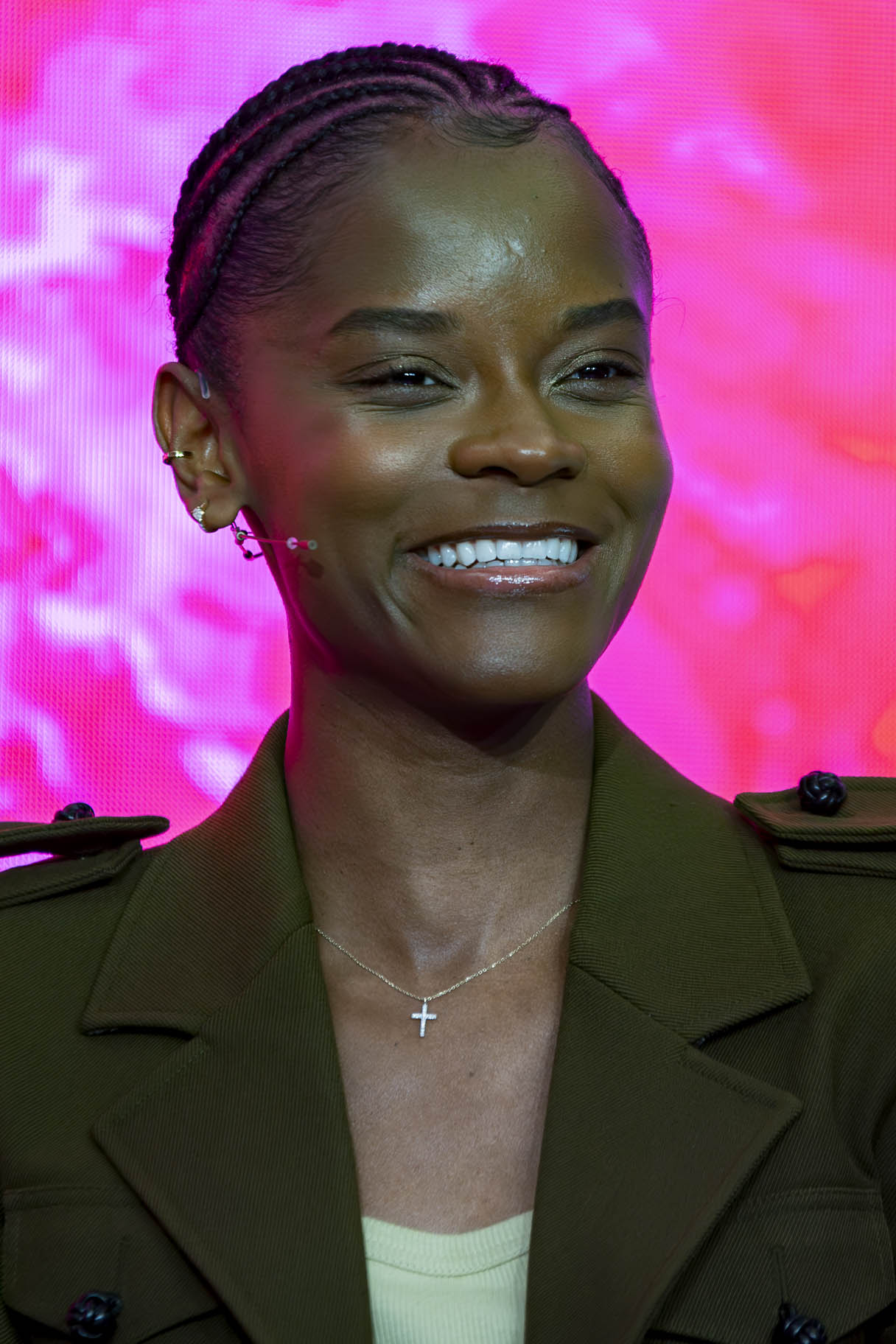
- Wright at SXSW London in 2025
- Born: 31 October 1993 (age 33); Georgetown, Guyana
- Citizenship: Guyana; United Kingdom
- Education: Northumberland Park Community School; Identity School of Acting
- Occupation: Actress
- Years active: 2006–present

Letitia Michelle Wright (born 31 October 1993) is a Guyanese-British actress. She began her career with guest roles in the television series Top Boy, Coming Up, Chasing Shadows, Humans, Doctor Who, and Black Mirror. For the latter, she received a Primetime Emmy Award nomination. She then had her breakthrough for her role in the 2015 film Urban Hymn, for which the British Academy of Film and Television Arts (BAFTA) named Wright among the 2015 group of BAFTA Breakthrough Brits.

In 2018, she attained global recognition for her portrayal of Shuri in the Marvel Cinematic Universe film Black Panther, for which she won an NAACP Image Award and a SAG Award. Wright reprised the role in Avengers: Infinity War (2018), Avengers: Endgame (2019), and Black Panther: Wakanda Forever (2022). In 2019, she received the BAFTA Rising Star Award. She also appeared in Steve McQueen's 2020 anthology series Small Axe, which earned her a Satellite Award nomination.

== Early life and education ==
Letitia Michelle Wright was born on 31 October 1993 in Georgetown, Guyana. Her family moved to London, England, when she was eight years old, and she attended Northumberland Park Community School.

On 1 February 2023, she was awarded an Honorary Doctorate in Arts and Letters from the University of Guyana at an Extraordinary Convocation Ceremony.

== Career ==
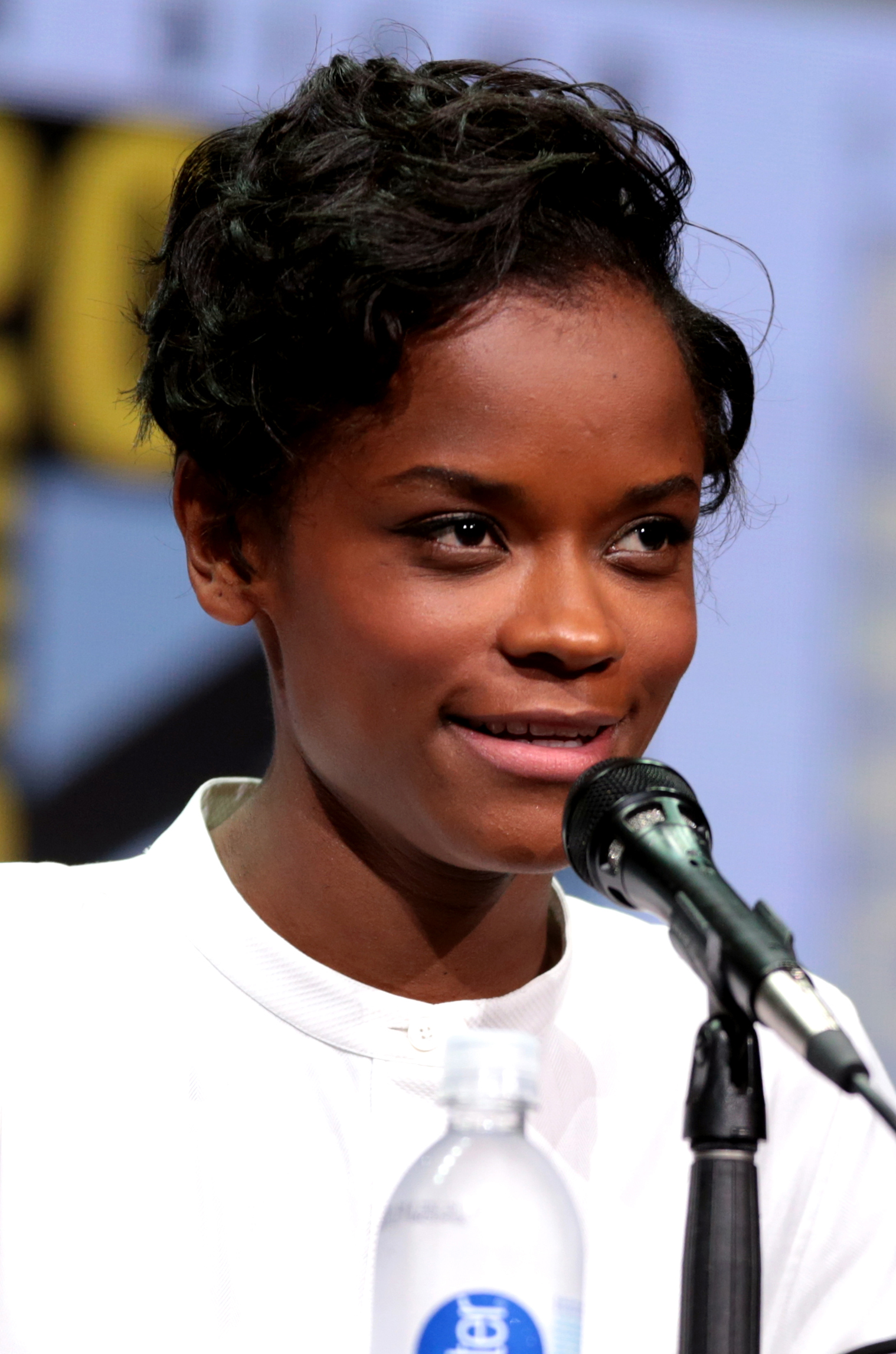
Wright at the 2017 San Diego Comic-Con

Wright performed in school plays, but she credits her desire to be a professional actress to seeing the 2006 film Akeelah and the Bee. She found Keke Palmer's performance inspiring, remarking that the role "resonated. It's one of the reasons why I'm here". She attended the Identity School of Acting.

In 2011, she appeared as a recurring role in the series Top Boy and in two episodes of Holby City. She had a small role in the 2012 film My Brother the Devil, for which she was recognized by Screen International as one of its 2012 Stars of Tomorrow. Michael Caton-Jones cast Wright in her first leading role in Urban Hymn (2015), which brought her to the attention of Hollywood. The same year, she appeared in the Doctor Who episode Face the Raven, and the following year, she began a recurring role as Renie on Humans. During this time, she also appeared in the play Eclipsed (written by Danai Gurira) at London's Gate Theatre. In 2017, Wright starred in the Black Mirror episode "Black Museum"; her performance earned her a Primetime Emmy Award nomination for Outstanding Supporting Actress in a Limited Series or Movie.

Wright co-starred in the 2018 film Black Panther, playing the role of Shuri, King T'Challa's sister and princess of Wakanda. Part of the Marvel Cinematic Universe, the film also starred Chadwick Boseman, Michael B. Jordan, Lupita Nyong'o, and Danai Gurira. Wright won the NAACP Image Award for Outstanding Breakthrough Performance in a Motion Picture for her work in the film, and reprised the role in Avengers: Infinity War, which was released two months later. Also in 2018, Wright appeared as Reb in Steven Spielberg's film adaptation of the 2011 science-fiction novel Ready Player One. Wright features as one of the cameos in Drake's music video for "Nice for What".

In 2018, Wright was also featured in a play called The Convert, which was staged at London's Young Vic Theatre. The play was the story of an English-speaking missionary in the 19th century, where the Africans were trained to speak Victorian English and engage in Christianity. This play was set in 1895, when a Black male Catholic teacher and missionary called Chilford occupies a mission house in Rhodesian Salisbury. Wright plays the character of a Jekesai, a young Rhodesia girl who is being forced into marriage by her uncle, but is saved by Chilford.

In 2019, Wright won the BAFTA Rising Star Award. In April 2019, Wright appeared alongside Donald Glover and Rihanna in Guava Island, a short musical film released by Amazon Studios, before reprising her role as Shuri in Avengers: Endgame.

In 2020, Wright founded the production company 3.16 Productions, named for the Bible verse John 3:16.

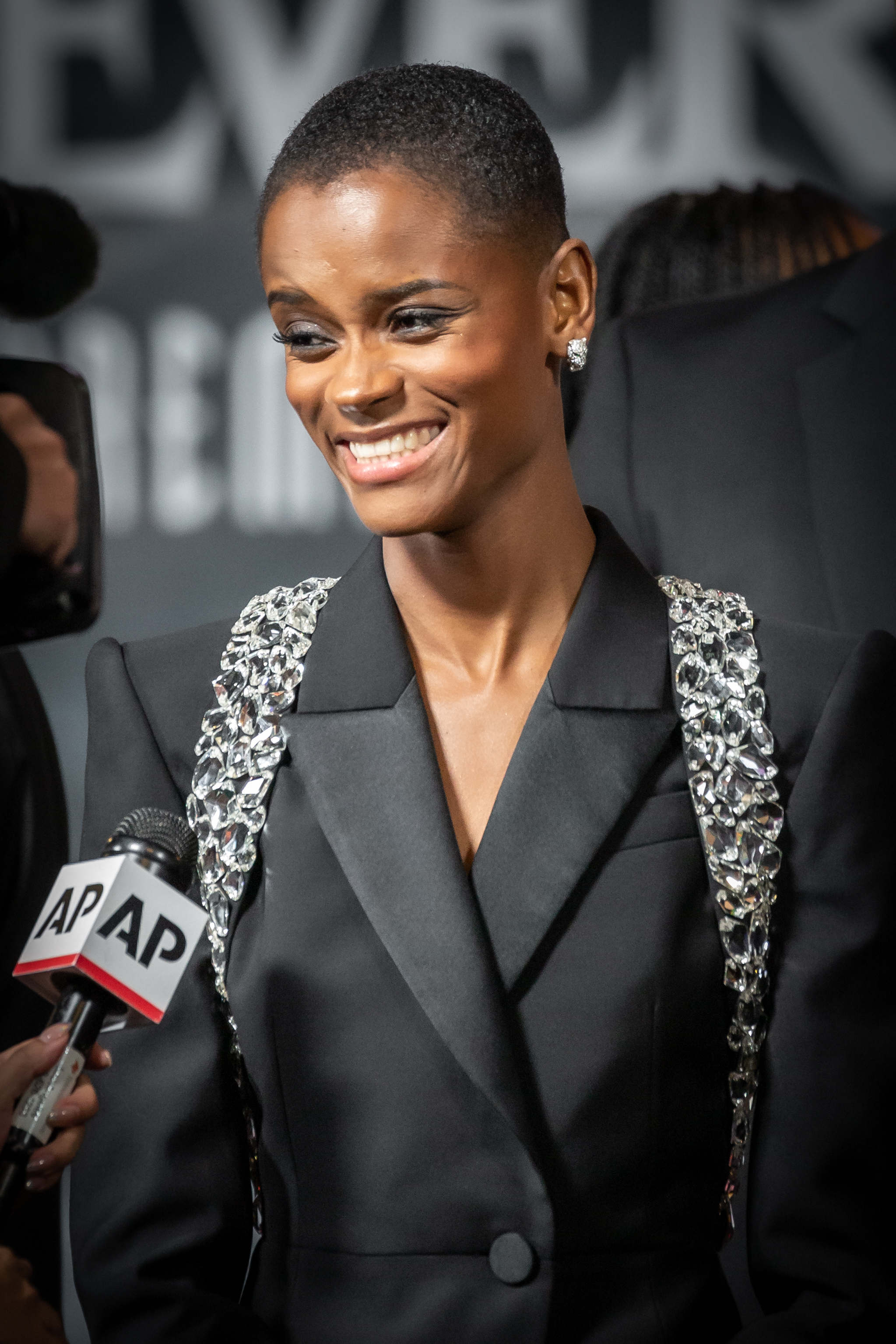
Wright in 2022

Wright appeared in 2022's Death on the Nile. She was also cast in Steve McQueen's mini-series Small Axe, set in London's West Indian community between the 1960s and 1980s. In the first episode, Mangrove, which premiered on BBC One on 15 November 2020, Wright plays British Black Panther leader Altheia Jones-LeCointe, who, along with eight other Black activists, was arrested and charged with inciting a riot after a peaceful protest in 1970. Wright earned "Best Supporting Actress" nominations for this role, bringing "focussed energy and passion" to her depiction of the real-life Jones-LeCointe, as noted by The New Yorker.

In September 2022 appeared as June Gibbons in the film The Silent Twins, based on the 1986 book of the same name by Marjorie Wallace.

Wright returned as Shuri for Black Panther: Wakanda Forever, which depicts Shuri becoming the new Black Panther following the death of T'Challa; the film marked her first leading role. Released in November 2022, the film was made in honor of Chadwick Boseman, who died from colon cancer in 2020. During the filming of a chase sequence in August 2021, she fractured her shoulder and suffered a concussion following a motorcycle accident, causing production to pause while she recuperated. She is set to reprise the role in the upcoming films Avengers: Doomsday (2026), Avengers: Secret Wars (2027), and Black Panther III (2028).

== Personal life ==
Wright has opened up about her struggles with depression. She told Vanity Fair in 2018 that when she first experienced depression at the age of 20, she "was in the dark going through so many bad things". Wright credits her Christian faith, which she discovered after attending a London actors' Bible study meeting, with helping her overcome the depression. To focus on her recovery and her faith, she turned down film roles. She later explained she "needed to take a break from acting" and "went on a journey to discover my relationship with God, and I became a Christian."

In December 2020, Wright generated controversy from media for sharing on Twitter, with praying hands emojis, a video from the YouTube channel On The Table in which Tomi Arayomi, a senior leader with the Light London church, expressed doubts about COVID-19 vaccines and also discussed the COVID-19 lab leak theory, amongst other statements; the video was later deleted. Wright later clarified: "My intention was not to hurt anyone, my ONLY intention of posting the video was it raised my concerns with what the vaccine contains and what we are putting in our bodies. Nothing else." She subsequently left social media.

In October 2021, The Hollywood Reporter reported that Wright had parted ways with her U.S. team of representatives due to the response to the video and her alleged promotion of anti-vaccine sentiments on the set of Black Panther: Wakanda Forever. Wright returned to social media to deny these claims. Her Wakanda Forever co-star Angela Bassett stated that she had never heard Wright share such sentiments during filming, while Marvel vice president Nate Moore said that she was not sharing her views on set and that her status did not affect production. Later that month, Wright condemned The Hollywood Reporter for an article that included her amongst awards-season prospects with "personal baggage", in which its author Scott Feinberg compared her past comments with men accused of abuse and sexual misconduct. She reiterated that she had already apologised for her comments two years prior and had remained silent on the topic, and accused both the publication and Feinberg of having an "agenda" against her, which she described as "vile" and "disgusting" behaviour.

== Filmography ==
Key
†	Denotes films that have not yet been released

=== Film ===
Year	Title	Role	Notes	Ref.
2011	Victim	Nyla		
2012	My Brother the Devil	Aisha		
2015	Urban Hymn	Jamie Harrison		
2018	The Commuter	Jules Skateboarder		
2018	Black Panther	Shuri		
2018	Ready Player One	Reb		
2018	Avengers: Infinity War	Shuri		
2019	Guava Island	Yara Love		
2019	Avengers: Endgame	Shuri		
2021	Sing 2	Nooshy (voice)		
2022	Death on the Nile	Rosalie Otterbourne		
2022	The Silent Twins	June Gibbons	Also producer	
2022	Aisha	Aisha Osagie		
2022	Black Panther: Wakanda Forever	Shuri / Black Panther		
2023	Surrounded	Moses "Mo" Washington	Also producer	
2024	Sound of Hope: The Story of Possum Trot	—N/a	Executive producer	
2025	Highway to the Moon	—N/a	Directorial debut; also writer and producer	
2026	Avengers: Doomsday †	Shuri / Black Panther	Post-production	

=== Television ===
Year	Title	Role	Notes
2011	Holby City	Ellie Maynard	Episodes: "Tunnel Vision" and "Crossing the Line"
2011	Top Boy	Chantelle	Recurring cast (season 1)
2011	Random	Girl 3	TV movie
2013	Coming Up	Hannah	Episode: "Big Girl"
2014	Chasing Shadows	Taylor Davis	Episode: "Only Connect: Part 1 & 2"
2014	Glasgow Girls	Amal	TV movie
2015	Banana	Vivienne Scott	Recurring cast
2015	Cucumber	Vivienne Scott	Recurring cast
2015	Doctor Who	Anahson	Episode: "Face the Raven"
2016	Humans	Renie	Recurring cast (season 2)
2017	Black Mirror	Nish	Episode: "Black Museum"
2020	Small Axe	Altheia Jones	Episode: "Mangrove"
2021	I Am...	Danielle	Episode: "I Am Danielle"

=== Theatre ===
Year	Title	Role	Venue	Notes	Ref.
2013	Cape	Tanya	Unicorn Theater	London	
2026	The Story	Yvonne Wilson	Royal National Theatre	London	

== Awards and nominations ==
Year	Award	Category	Work	Result	Ref.
2018	Primetime Emmy Awards	Outstanding Supporting Actress in a Limited Series or Movie	Black Mirror	Nominated	
2018	Saturn Awards	Best Performance by a Younger Actor	Black Panther	Nominated	
2018	MTV Movie & TV Awards	Best On-Screen Team	Black Panther	Nominated	
2018	MTV Movie & TV Awards	Scene Stealer	Black Panther	Nominated	
2018	Teen Choice Awards	Choice Sci-Fi Movie Actress	Black Panther	Won	
2018	Teen Choice Awards	Choice Breakout Movie Star	Black Panther	Nominated	
2019	Black Reel Awards	Best Supporting Actress	Black Panther	Nominated	
2019	Black Reel Awards	Best Breakthrough Performance, Female	Black Panther	Won	
2019	NAACP Image Awards	Outstanding Breakthrough Performance in a Motion Picture	Black Panther	Won	
2019	NAACP Image Awards	Outstanding Supporting Actress in a Motion Picture	Black Panther	Nominated	
2019	Screen Actors Guild Awards	Outstanding Performance by a Cast in a Motion Picture	Black Panther	Won	
2019	British Academy Film Awards	Rising Star Award	Herself	Won	
2020	Chicago Film Critics Association	Best Supporting Actress	Small Axe	Nominated	
2020	Satellite Awards	Best Supporting Actress – Series, Miniseries or Television Film	Small Axe	Nominated	
2021	Black Reel Awards	Outstanding Supporting Actress, TV Movie/Limited Series	Small Axe	Nominated	
2021	British Academy Television Awards	Best Actress	Small Axe	Nominated	
2022	NAACP Image Awards	Outstanding Character Voice-Over Performance – Motion Picture	Sing 2	Won	
2023	NAACP Image Awards	Outstanding Actress in a Motion Picture	Black Panther: Wakanda Forever	Nominated	
2023	London Film Critics Circle Awards	Award for Actress of the Year	Black Panther: Wakanda Forever	Nominated	
2023	Black Reel Awards	Outstanding Actress	Black Panther: Wakanda Forever	Nominated	
2023	Kids' Choice Awards	Favorite Movie Actress	Black Panther: Wakanda Forever	Nominated	
2023	Critics' Choice Super Awards	Best Actress in a Superhero Movie	Black Panther: Wakanda Forever	Nominated	

== See also ==
- List of British actors
