= Chicago Film Critics Association Award for Best Supporting Actress =

Annual acting award

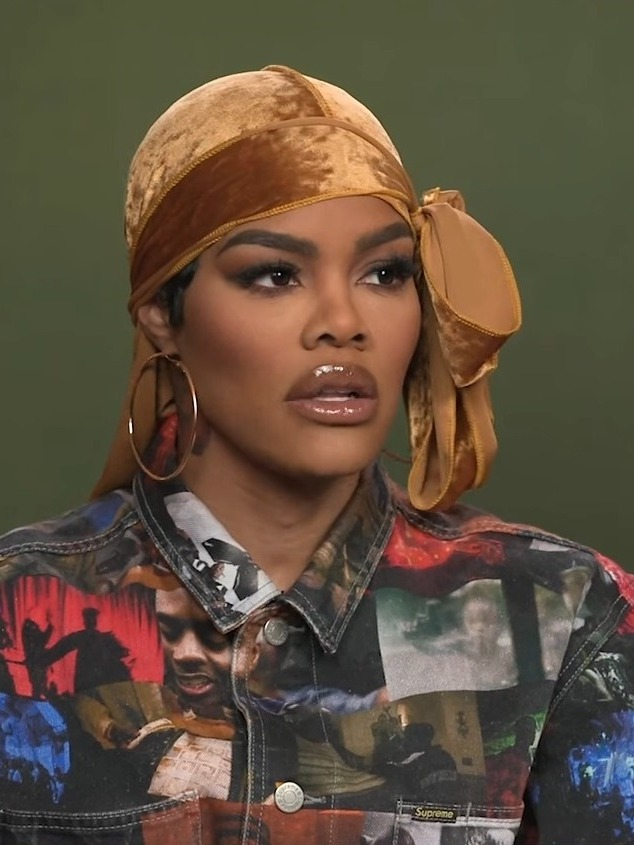
- The 2025 recipient: Teyana Taylor
- Awarded for: Best Performance by an Actress in a Supporting Role
- Country: United States
- Presented by: Chicago Film Critics Association
- First award: Frances McDormand; Mississippi Burning (1988)
- Currently held by: Teyana Taylor; One Battle After Another (2025)
- Website: www.chicagofilmcritics.org

The Chicago Film Critics Association Award for Best Supporting Actress is an annual award given by the Chicago Film Critics Association.

== Winners ==
=== 1980s ===
Year	Winner and nominees	Film	Role
1988	Frances McDormand	Mississippi Burning	Mrs. Pell
1989	Laura San Giacomo	Sex, Lies, and Videotape	Cynthia Patrice Bishop
1989	Ellen Barkin	Johnny Handsome	Sunny Boyd
1989	Shirley MacLaine	Steel Magnolias	Louisa "Ouiser" Boudreaux
1989	Amy Madigan	Field of Dreams	Annie Kinsella
1989	Mary Steenburgen	Miss Firecracker	Elain Rutledge

=== 1990s ===
Year	Winner and nominees	Film	Role
1990	Lorraine Bracco	Goodfellas	Karen Hill
1991	Mercedes Ruehl	The Fisher King	Anne
1991	Halle Berry	Jungle Fever	Vivian
1991	Glenne Headly	Mortal Thoughts	Joyce Urbanski
1991	Diane Ladd	Rambling Rose	Mother
1991	Juliette Lewis	Cape Fear	Danielle Bowden
1991	Elizabeth Perkins	The Doctor	June Ellis
1991	Amanda Plummer	The Fisher King	Lydia
1992	Judy Davis	Husbands and Wives	Sally
1992	Marcia Gay Harden	Used People	Norma
1992	Rosie Perez	White Men Can't Jump	Gloria Clemente
1992	Miranda Richardson	The Crying Game	Jude
1992	Marisa Tomei	My Cousin Vinny	Mona Lisa Vito
1993	Rosie Perez	Fearless	Carla Rodrigo
1993	Andie MacDowell	Short Cuts	Ann Finnigan
1993	Anna Paquin	The Piano	Flora McGrath
1993	Winona Ryder	The Age of Innocence	May Welland
1993	Irene Worth	Lost in Yonkers	Grandma
1994	Dianne Wiest	Bullets Over Broadway	Helen Sinclair
1994	Claire Danes	Little Women	Elizabeth "Beth" March
1994	Kirsten Dunst	Interview with the Vampire	Claudia
1994	Lena Olin	Romeo Is Bleeding	Mona Demarkov
1994	Uma Thurman	Pulp Fiction	Mia Wallace
1995	Joan Allen	Nixon	Pat Nixon
1995	Kathleen Quinlan	Apollo 13	Marilyn Lovell
1995	Kyra Sedgwick	Something to Talk About	Emma Rae King
1995	Mira Sorvino	Mighty Aphrodite	Linda Ash
1995	Diane Venora	Heat	Justine Hanna
1996	Irma P. Hall	A Family Thing	Aunt T.
1996	Joan Allen	The Crucible	Elizabeth Proctor
1996	Juliette Binoche	The English Patient	Hana
1996	Barbara Hershey	The Portrait of a Lady	Madame Serena Merle
1996	Natalie Portman	Beautiful Girls	Marty
1997	Debbi Morgan	Eve's Bayou	Mozelle Batiste Delacroix
1997	Joan Allen	The Ice Storm	Elena Hood
1997	Joan Cusack	In & Out	Emily Montgomery
1997	Julianne Moore	Boogie Nights	Amber Waves
1997	Sarah Polley	The Sweet Hereafter	Nicole Burnell
1998	Kathy Bates	Primary Colors	Libby Holden
1998	Joan Allen	Pleasantville	Betty Parker
1998	Kimberly Elise	Beloved	Denver
1998	Rachel Griffiths	Hilary and Jackie	Hilary du Pré
1998	Lisa Kudrow	The Opposite of Sex	Lucia De Lury
1999	Chloë Sevigny	Boys Don't Cry	Lana Tisdel
1999	Angelina Jolie	Girl, Interrupted	Lisa Rowe
1999	Catherine Keener	Being John Malkovich	Maxine Lund
1999	Julianne Moore	An Ideal Husband	Mrs. Laura Cheveley
1999	Samantha Morton	Sweet and Lowdown	Hattie

=== 2000s ===
Year	Winner and nominees	Film	Role
2000	Frances McDormand	Almost Famous	Elaine Miller
2000	Kate Hudson	Almost Famous	Penny Lane
2000	Julie Walters	Billy Elliot	Mrs. Georgia Wilkinson
2000	Catherine Zeta-Jones	Traffic	Helena Ayala
2000	Zhang Ziyi	Crouching Tiger, Hidden Dragon	Jen Yu
2001	Cameron Diaz	Vanilla Sky	Julianna Gianni
2001	Jennifer Connelly	A Beautiful Mind	Alicia Nash
2001	Helen Mirren	Gosford Park	Mrs. Wilson
2001	Maggie Smith	Gosford Park	Constance, Countess of Trentham
2001	Marisa Tomei	In the Bedroom	Natalie Strout
2002	Meryl Streep	Adaptation	Susan Orlean
2002	Kathy Bates	About Schmidt	Roberta Hertzel
2002	Patricia Clarkson	Far from Heaven	Eleanor Fine
2002	Julianne Moore	The Hours	Laura Brown
2002	Emily Mortimer	Lovely & Amazing	Elizabeth Marks
2003	Patricia Clarkson	Pieces of April	Joy Burns
2003	Ellen DeGeneres	Finding Nemo	Dory
2003	Marcia Gay Harden	Mystic River	Celeste Boyle
2003	Holly Hunter	Thirteen	Melanie Freeland
2003	Miranda Richardson	Spider	Yvonne / Mrs. Cleg
2003	Renée Zellweger	Cold Mountain	Ruby Thewes
2004	Virginia Madsen	Sideways	Maya Randall
2005	Maria Bello	A History of Violence	Edie Stall
2005	Amy Adams	Junebug	Ashley Johnsten
2005	Scarlett Johansson	Match Point	Nola Rice
2005	Catherine Keener	Capote	Harper Lee
2005	Rachel Weisz	The Constant Gardener	Tessa Quayle
2005	Michelle Williams	Brokeback Mountain	Alma Beers-Del Mar
2006	Rinko Kikuchi	Babel	Chieko
2006	Adriana Barraza	Babel	Amelia
2006	Cate Blanchett	Notes on a Scandal	Sheba Hart
2006	Abigail Breslin	Little Miss Sunshine	Olive Hoover
2006	Toni Collette	Little Miss Sunshine	Sheryl Hoover
2006	Jennifer Hudson	Dreamgirls	Effie White
2007	Cate Blanchett	I'm Not There	Jude Quinn
2007	Jennifer Jason Leigh	Margot at the Wedding	Pauline
2007	Leslie Mann	Knocked Up	Debbie
2007	Amy Ryan	Gone Baby Gone	Helene McCready
2007	Tilda Swinton	Michael Clayton	Karen Crowder
2008	Kate Winslet	The Reader	Hanna Schmitz
2008	Amy Adams	Doubt	Sister James
2008	Viola Davis	Doubt	Mrs. Miller
2008	Penélope Cruz	Vicky Cristina Barcelona	María Elena
2008	Rosemarie DeWitt	Rachel Getting Married	Rachel
2009	Mo'Nique	Precious	Mary Lee Johnston
2009	Vera Farmiga	Up in the Air	Alex Goran
2009	Anna Kendrick	Up in the Air	Natalie Keener
2009	Julianne Moore	A Single Man	Charley
2009	Natalie Portman	Brothers	Grace Cahill

=== 2010s ===
Year	Winner and nominees	Film	Role
2010	Hailee Steinfeld	True Grit	Mattie Ross
2010	Amy Adams	The Fighter	Charlene Fleming
2010	Melissa Leo	The Fighter	Alice Eklund
2010	Helena Bonham Carter	The King's Speech	Queen Elizabeth
2010	Jacki Weaver	Animal Kingdom	Janine "Smurf" Cody
2011	Jessica Chastain	The Tree of Life	Mrs. O'Brien
2011	Melissa McCarthy	Bridesmaids	Megan
2011	Carey Mulligan	Shame	Sissy Sullivan
2011	Octavia Spencer	The Help	Minny Jackson
2011	Shailene Woodley	The Descendants	Alexandra King
2012	Amy Adams	The Master	Peggy Dodd
2012	Emily Blunt	Looper	Sara Rollins
2012	Judi Dench	Skyfall	M
2012	Sally Field	Lincoln	Mary Todd Lincoln
2012	Anne Hathaway	Les Misérables	Fantine
2013	Lupita Nyong'o	12 Years a Slave	Patsey
2013	Scarlett Johansson	Her	Samantha (voice)
2013	Jennifer Lawrence	American Hustle	Rosalyn Rosenfeld
2013	Léa Seydoux	Blue Is the Warmest Colour	Emma
2013	June Squibb	Nebraska	Kate Grant
2014	Patricia Arquette	Boyhood	Olivia Evans
2014	Jessica Chastain	A Most Violent Year	Anna Morales
2014	Laura Dern	Wild	Barbara "Bobbi" Grey
2014	Agata Kulesza	Ida	Wanda
2014	Emma Stone	Birdman	Sam Thomson
2015	Alicia Vikander	Ex Machina	Ava
2015	Jennifer Jason Leigh	Anomalisa	Lisa Hesselman
2015	Jennifer Jason Leigh	The Hateful Eight	Daisy Domergue
2015	Cynthia Nixon	James White	Gail White
2015	Kristen Stewart	Clouds of Sils Maria	Valentine
2016	Michelle Williams	Manchester by the Sea	Randi Chandler
2016	Viola Davis	Fences	Rose Maxson
2016	Lily Gladstone	Certain Women	Jamie
2016	Naomie Harris	Moonlight	Paula
2016	Janelle Monáe	Hidden Figures	Mary Jackson
2017	Laurie Metcalf	Lady Bird	Marion McPherson
2017	Mary J. Blige	Mudbound	Florence Jackson
2017	Holly Hunter	The Big Sick	Beth Gardner
2017	Allison Janney	I, Tonya	LaVona Golden
2017	Lesley Manville	Phantom Thread	Cyril Woodcock
2018	Olivia Colman	The Favourite	Queen Anne
2018	Elizabeth Debicki	Widows	Alice
2018	Zoe Kazan	The Ballad of Buster Scruggs	Alice Longabaugh
2018	Regina King	If Beale Street Could Talk	Sharon Rivers
2018	Rachel Weisz	The Favourite	Lady Sarah
2019	Florence Pugh	Little Women	Amy March
2019	Cho Yeo-jeong	Parasite	Yeon-gyo
2019	Laura Dern	Marriage Story	Nora Fanshaw
2019	Jennifer Lopez	Hustlers	Ramona Vega
2019	Zhao Shuzhen	The Farewell	Nai Nai

=== 2020s ===
Year	Winner and nominees	Film	Role
2020	Maria Bakalova	Borat Subsequent Moviefilm	Tutar Sagdiyev
2020	Toni Collette	I'm Thinking of Ending Things	Mother
2020	Amanda Seyfried	Mank	Marion Davies
2020	Letitia Wright	Mangrove	Altheia Jones-LeCointe
2020	Youn Yuh-jung	Minari	Soon-ja
2021	Ruth Negga	Passing	Clare Bellew
2021	Catriona Balfe	Belfast	Ma
2021	Jessie Buckley	The Lost Daughter	Young Leda Caruso
2021	Ariana DeBose	West Side Story	Anita
2021	Riley Keough	Zola	Stefani
2022	Kerry Condon	The Banshees of Inisherin	Siobhán Súilleabháin
2022	Hong Chau	The Whale	Liz
2022	Stephanie Hsu	Everything Everywhere All at Once	Joy Wang
2022	Janelle Monáe	Glass Onion: A Knives Out Mystery	Helen Brand
2022	Michelle Williams	The Fabelmans	Mitzi Schildkraut-Fabelman
2023	Da’Vine Joy Randolph	The Holdovers	Mary Lamb
2023	Jodie Foster	Nyad	Bonnie Stoll
2023	Sandra Hüller	The Zone of Interest	Hedwig Höss
2023	Rachel McAdams	Are You There God? It's Me, Margaret.	Barbara Simon
2023	Julianne Moore	May December	Gracie Atherton-Yoo
2024	Natasha Lyonne	His Three Daughters	Rachel
2024	Danielle Deadwyler	The Piano Lesson	Berniece Charles
2024	Ariana Grande	Wicked	Galinda Upland
2024	Margaret Qualley	The Substance	Sue
2024	Zoe Saldaña	Emilia Pérez	Rita Mora Castro
2025	Teyana Taylor	One Battle After Another	Perfidia Beverly Hills
2025	Odessa A'zion	Marty Supreme	Rachel Mizler
2025	Nina Hoss	Hedda	Eileen Lovborg
2025	Inga Ibsdotter Lilleaas	Sentimental Value	Agnes Borg Pettersen
2025	Amy Madigan	Weapons	Gladys
2025	Wunmi Mosaku	Sinners	Annie
