= T-Bone Wilson =

British actor

- Born: Guyana
- Education: Mountview Theatre School
- Occupations: Actor, dramatist, poet

T-Bone Wilson is a Guyanese-British actor, dramatist and poet.

== Life ==
Wilson came to England from Guyana in 1962 as an engineering student. Deciding to take up drama, he trained at the Mountview Theatre School. Wilson acted in Mustapha Matura's series of short plays, Black Pieces, staged by Roland Rees at the ICA in 1970. Wilson was inspired to become a playwright himself, writing Jumbie Street March, Body and Soul (1974) and Come Jubilee (1977). Jumbie Street March was produced by the Dark and Light Theatre Company.

As a theatre actor, Wilson performed in the National Theatre's 1981 production of Measure for Measure, the first main-stage Shakespeare by a national theatre company to employ a majority of ethnic minority actors. He played Banquo in a 1984 production of Macbeth at the Young Vic Theatre.

Wilson appeared in the 1979 television drama A Hole in Babylon, based on events leading up to the 1975 Spaghetti House siege. He also appeared in Franco Rosso's 1980 film Babylon, which portrayed sound system culture and racism in Brixton.

== Writing ==
=== Poetry ===
- Wilson, T-Bone (1980). Counterblast. London: Karnak House. ISBN 0907015026.

=== Plays ===
- Wilson, T-Bone (1974). Body and Soul. London: Keskidee Arts Centre.
- Wilson, T-Bone (1972). Come Jubilee. London: Bush Theatre.

== Filmography ==
Year	Title	Role	Notes	Ref.
1975	Pressure	Junior	Released 1978	
1977	Black Joy	Shark		
1980	Babylon	Wesley		
1982	Prime Suspect 2			

=== Television ===
Year	Title	Role	Notes	Ref.
1976	The Melting Pot			
1979	Play for Today	Frank Davies	Series 10, Episode 7 "A Hole in Babylon"	

=== Stage ===
Year	Title	Role	Venue	Notes	Ref.
1970s	Jumbie Street March		Keskidee Arts Centre	Also playwright	
1981	Measure for Measure	First Gentleman	National Theatre, Lyttelton Theatre		
1984	Macbeth	Banquo	Young Vic Theatre		
