= Tamara Howe =

British television production manager and executive (born 1965)

- Born: November 1965 (age 60–61); Lewisham, London, England
- Occupations: Television production manager and executive
- Parents: Darcus Howe (father); Una Howe (mother)

Tamara Howe (born November 1965) is a British television production manager and executive with more than 30 years' experience, including working at London Weekend Television, before joining BBC TV, where she held various posts, culminating with the role of Controller of Business, Comedy & Entertainment, Television. She featured in Powerlist 2013: Britain's Most Influential Black People, described as "one of the most influential people at the BBC".

== Early life ==
Tamara Howe, daughter of Race Today editors Una Howe and Darcus Howe, was born in Lewisham, London.

== Career ==
Howe's start in television was as a trainee production assistant at Bandung Productions (whose programmes included Channel 4's Bandung File, co-edited by Darcus Howe with Tariq Ali), and she was Director of Production at Granada from 1999 to 2002, during which time she was a founding member of the Cultural Diversity Network, working with other key broadcasters to improve representation on and off the screen, before joining BBC Current Affairs as Head of Production & Finance in 2003. She moved on to become Chief Operating Officer, BBC Children's (2006–12) and then in 2012 became Controller Production Operations, Vision, with responsibility for programmes such as EastEnders, Top Gear, The One Show, Luther and Strictly Come Dancing.

In 2012, she was appointed the BBC's Controller of Business, Comedy & Entertainment, Television.

In Vice Media's restructuring of its UK-based TV and digital operations, Howe was brought in to oversee content in 2018.

Howe is a London Council member of the Prince's Trust, chairs the Edinburgh TV Festival Talent Schemes, and is a governor at Ravensbourne University London.
