= Grenada Boys' Secondary School =

Location
- Tanteen; St. George; Grenada
- 12.047282°N 61.746353°W

Information
- School type: Governmental, Public
- Motto: Non Palma Sine Labore (No Reward Without Labour)
- Established: 1885
- School district: 5
- School code: 080004
- Chairman: Terence Moore
- Principal: Mr. Phillip Thomas
- Faculty: 50
- Grades: 9-13
- Gender: Male
- Age range: 11-18
- Classes: 20
- Average class size: 35
- Hours in school day: 6
- Houses: Archer Baptiste Hughes McGuire
- Slogan: The Prize To The One Who Earns It
- Website: https://www.facebook.com/thegbss

The Grenada Boys' Secondary School (GBSS) is a secondary school on the island of Grenada.

== Origins ==
The Grenada Boys' Secondary School, initially known as St. George's Grammar School, opened on 2 February 1885 with ten male students at Mrs. Grey's premises on Hospital Street in St. George's.

In 1910–11 the school was restructured and renamed Grenada Boys' Secondary School and was relocated to Melville Street at the present site of the Police Barracks. The new premises was officially opened on September 18, 1911 with an enrollment of 23 students. In May 1946 the school was relocated to Tanteen to wooden barracks, which previously housed the Windward Island battalion for World War II. The wooden barracks were destroyed by Hurricane Ivan in 2004. The school experienced severe destruction from two fires in April and June 2005. Later that year, the school's auditorium was refurbished through the sponsorship of Digicel. The first phase of the new school was constructed from 2006 to 2008 by the government of Grenada, and funded by the World Bank. Further renovations took place in 2021.

The GBSS has been mainly a boys’ school but girls have also attended, especially for the sixth form (A-level) years. Girls were admitted into Form I from 1982 (during the reign of the People's Revolutionary Government) until 1987, but were phased out by 1991.

In recent decades, the school attendance is approximately 840 male students. The administration consists of a principal, 50 teachers, and two counselors. The school can be found on Facebook.

== Notable alumni ==
- Herbert Blaize
- Sir Nicolas Brathwaite
- Vincent Darius
- Peter David
- Sir Leo Victor De Gale
- Kurt Felix
- Rhodan Gordon
- Kirani James
- Junior Murray
- Corey Ollivierre
- Jacob Ross
- Sir Paul Scoon
- K. Dwight Venner
- Lindon Victor
- Kingsley James
