= Babylon (1980 film) =

1980 film by Franco Rosso

- Theatrical release poster
- Directed by: Franco Rosso
- Written by: Franco Rosso; Martin Stellman
- Produced by: Gavrik Losey
- Starring: Brinsley Forde; Karl Howman; Trevor Laird; Stefan Kalipha
- Cinematography: Chris Menges
- Edited by: Thomas Schwalm
- Music by: Dennis Bovell
- Production company: National Film Finance Corporation
- Distributed by: Kino Lorber Repertory Seventy-Seven
- Release date: 30 October 1980 (United Kingdom)
- Running time: 95 minutes
- Country: United Kingdom
- Languages: English and Jamaican patois with subtitles
- Budget: £300,000

Babylon is a 1980 British drama film directed by Franco Rosso. Written by Franco Rosso and Martin Stellman, it is an incendiary portrait of racial tension and police brutality set in south London. The film, anchored by Dennis Bovell’s propulsive score, is partly based on Bovell’s false imprisonment for running a Jamaican sound system, Sufferer’s Hi Fi, in the mid-1970s.

Produced by Gavrik Losey and the National Film Finance Corporation, the film is regarded as a classic.

== Plot ==
Babylon follows a young reggae DJ (Brinsley Forde, M.B.E., frontman of the British group Aswad) of the Ital Lion sound system in Thatcher-era South London as he pursues his musical ambitions while also battling fiercely against the racism and xenophobia of employers, neighbours, police, and the National Front.

== Cast ==
- Brinsley Forde as Blue
- Karl Howman as Ronnie
- Trevor Laird as Beefy
- Brian Bovell as Spark
- Victor Romero Evans as Lover
- David N. Haynes as Errol
- Archie Pool as Dreadhead
- T-Bone Wilson as Wesley
- Mel Smith as Alan
- Beverly Michaels as Elaine
- Maggie Steed as Woman at Lockup Garage
- Bill Moody as man on Balcony
- Stefan Kalipha as Fat Larry
- Beverley Dublin as Sandra
- Granville Garner as Sandra's Father
- Mark Monero as Carlton
- David Cunningham as Sir Watts
- Cosmo Laidlaw as Rastaman
- Terence Dackombe as Thug
- Mikey Campbell as Promoter
- Angus Zeb as Doorman
- Wendell McKellar as Doorman
- Frank Sylvester as Weightlifter
- David Gant as Police Commissioner
- Michael Gunn as Detective at Door
- Harry Miller as Detective at Door
- Yvonne Agard as Mrs. Watts
- Alan Igbon as Rupert
- Donovan Platt as William
- Charles Cork as CID Detective
- Gary Whelan as CID Detective
- David Macdonald as White Gang Leader
- Derek Broome as Bus Conductor
- Anthony Trent as Fence
- Patrick Worrall as Spooky
- Malcolm Frederick as Wolf
- Vilma Hollingbery as Woman in Street
- Cynthia Powell as Mum
- King Sounds as Compere
- Ann Duncan as Beefy's Girl
- Jah Shaka as himself

== Production ==
Babylon was filmed on the streets of Deptford and Brixton, London. The story centres on sound system culture and themes of police brutality, racism, poverty, and disillusionment with lack of opportunities.

Babylon was filmed on a six-week shooting schedule, entirely on location in South London and the West End. The production headquarters were above a rambling church in Deptford. The set was totally closed to visitors, including journalists, because of the film's sensitive subject matter and the fact that shooting was taking place in an area of London where there was racial tension.

The cast of actors were carefully chosen, with the help of casting director Sheila Trezise, Franco Rosso, and Martin Stellman, who all already had many contacts within the black community. Aside from the regular actors, there were many extras. The vast majority were West Indians living around the Deptford, Lewisham, Peckham, and Croydon areas.

== Music ==
The film features an entirely reggae and dub soundtrack, including artists such as Yabby U, I-Roy, Aswad, and Dennis Bovell.

== Release ==
Babylon world-premiered at Cannes' Semaine de la critique in 1980.

It received an X rating, and was released in the United Kingdom in late 1980, and appeared at the 1981 Toronto International Film Festival on 11 September 1981. Originally deemed “too controversial, and likely to incite racial tension” to play at the New York Film Festival, the film was not released in the United States until 8 March 2019. The U.S. release was distributed by Kino Lorber and Seventy-Seven.

On 20 August 2019, Babylon was released on Blu-ray and DVD by Kino Lorber.

== Reception ==
=== Critical response ===
Babylon received praise from critics both at its original 1980 release and 2019 U.S. release. Many praised its representation of Black youth life in South London during the Thatcher-era. Wesley Morris of The New York Times chose the film as a critic's pick, claiming the film "still feels new… You're looking at people who, in 1980 England, were, at last, being properly, seriously seen.” Hua Hsu of The New Yorker noted how "few films portray this moment in black British life quite like Franco Rosso's Babylon".

The film also received acclaim for its themes of racial violence and police brutality. Robert Abele of the Los Angeles Times called the film "assertive and ebullient... alive as a movie can be". Jaya Saxena of GQ describes Blue's journey as "a story with literally epic stakes".

The film has an approval rating of 100% based on 27 critic reviews on the review aggregator Rotten Tomatoes.

=== Accolades ===
For Babylon, Franco Rosso won the 1981 Evening Standard British Film Awards Most Promising Filmmaker award.

== See also ==
- Sound system (Jamaican)
- Sound clash
- Toasting (Jamaican music)
- Rockers (1978 film)
- Lovers Rock (2020 film)
- List of hood films
