= Highway to the Moon =

British short drama film

- Directed by: Letitia Wright
- Screenplay by: Letitia Wright
- Produced by: Letitia Wright
- Starring: Kenyah Sandy; Lamar Waves
- Release date: May 31, 2025
- Country: United Kingdom
- Language: English

Highway to the Moon is a 2025 British short film written and produced and directed by Letitia Wright.

== Plot ==
Micah finds himself in a realm between life and death, the 'Inbetween' following his sudden killing.

== Cast ==
- Kenyah Sandy
- Lamar Waves

== Production ==
The short film is written, directed and produced by Letitia Wright who wrote the film in response to the ongoing knife crime crisis in London, and to spark discourse into dissecting its root causes and has called it a "love letter to young Black men all over the world", and elements were inspired by the killing of one of her brother's friends.

The film was commissioned through WeTransfer’s arts platform, WePresent. Kenyah Sandy and Lamar Waves lead the cast.

== Release ==
The film had its world premiere on 31 May 2025 at the South London Film Festival.
