= Black on Black (TV series) =

British television programme

Black on Black is a British television programme broadcast on Channel 4 between 1982 and 1985. Aimed at British African-Caribbean people, Black on Black was a magazine programme that aired every other week.

== History ==
Black on Black, commissioned and aired on Channel 4, was produced by London Weekend Television. It was directed by Trevor Hampton. The programme had the first team of black television journalists in Britain, including Julian Henriques, Simi Bedford, Kim Gordon, Elaine Smith and Victor Romero Evans. The programme's producer, Trevor Phillips, articulated what he saw as the programme's contribution in 1982:

British audiences are used to seeing blacks as rebels, criminals or victims. We make a positive impact as statesmen, writers, artists, musicians, and just real people.

Black on Black was presented by Beverley Anderson and (for the 1985 season) Pauline Black. In 1984, Darcus Howe did an unsuccessful screen test to be a presenter. Special feature programmes included "Ethiopia Special" (1983), on the 1983–1985 famine in Ethiopia, and "After the Invasion" (1983), on the aftermath of the US invasion of Grenada.
