= Mangrove Nine =

Group of British Black activists

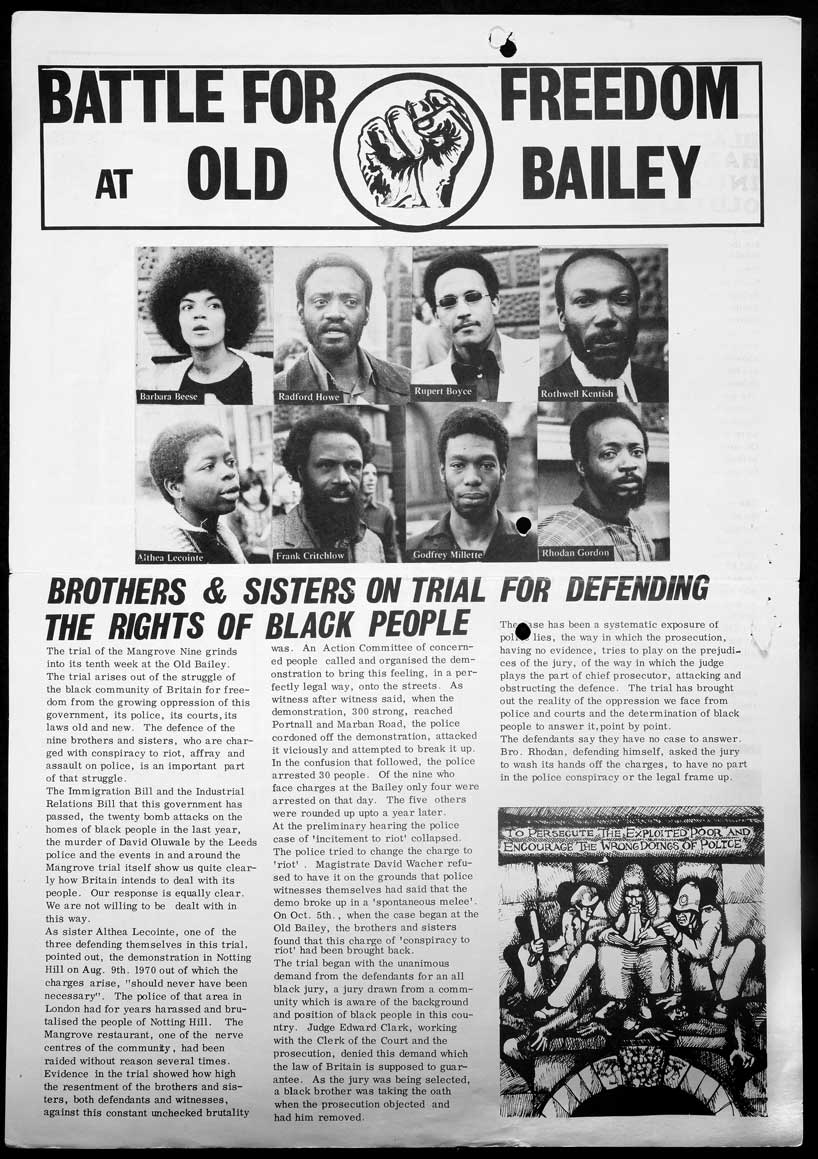

The Mangrove Nine were a group of British Black activists tried for inciting a riot at a 1970 protest against the police targeting of The Mangrove, a Caribbean restaurant in Notting Hill, West London.

Their trial lasted 55 days and involved various challenges by the Nine to the legitimacy of the British judicial process. They were all acquitted of the most serious charges and the trial became the first judicial acknowledgement of behaviour motivated by racial hatred within the Metropolitan Police.

== March on Portnall Road ==
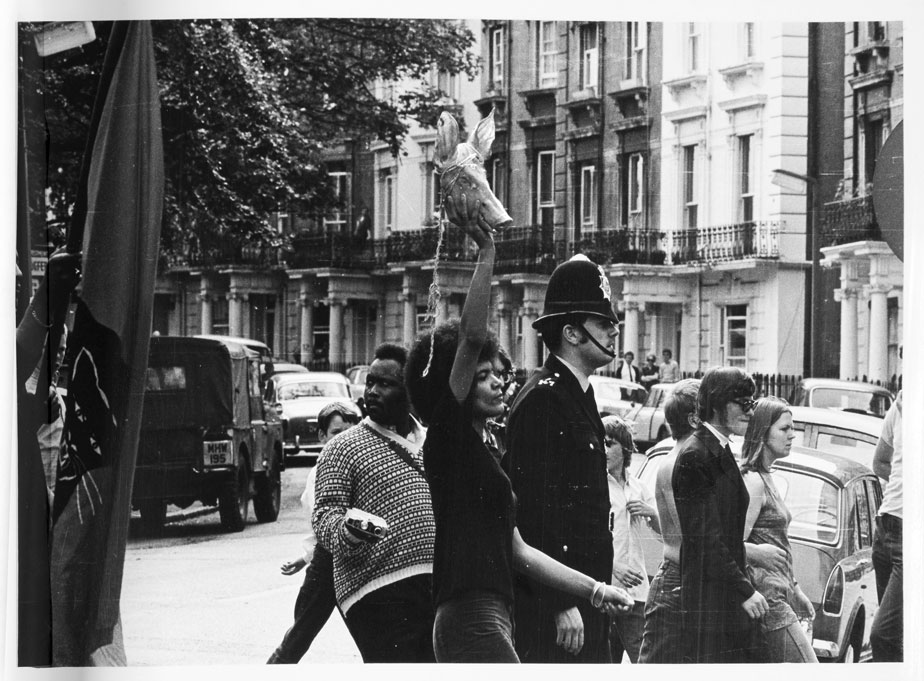
Barbara Beese during the demonstration of 9 August 1970

The Mangrove restaurant, opened in 1968 by Trinidad-born Frank Crichlow, was an important meeting space for the Black community in the Notting Hill area, including for Black intellectuals and activists. It was repeatedly raided by the police, on grounds of drug possession, despite a lack of evidence. In response, on 9 August 1970, the Black community staged a protest, where 150 people marched to the local police station.

Violence between police and protesters led to a series of arrests; after considering a variety of options, including inciting racial hatred under the Race Relations Act and deportation under new immigration rules, they were tried for incitement to riot. The case was thrown out by the presiding magistrate, who found that evidence from 12 police officers showed they equated Black radicalism with criminal intent, but the Director of Public Prosecutions reinstated the charges and the Mangrove Nine were re-arrested in a series of dawn raids.

== The Mangrove Nine ==
The Mangrove Nine were:

- Barbara Beese
- Rupert Boyce
- Frank Crichlow
- Rhodan Gordon
- Darcus Howe
- Elton Anthony Carlisle Inniss , aka Anthony Carlisle Innis, was born in Morvant, Trinidad, in 1947, into a wealthy and educated family. He was sent to England to get an education, and there met his Irish wife. He was a musician and was passionate about African culture. A daughter, Yinka Inniss Charles (later performing as hip hop artist MC Reason), was born a couple of months after the protest. Following the break-down of his marriage, he returned to Trinidad, never to return, traumatised by the treatment he had received in London. He died in 2010.
- Altheia Jones-LeCointe
- Rothwell Kentish
- Godfrey Millett

== Trial ==
In a departure from previous British Black Power trials, the accused decided not to adopt traditional legal tactics. First, two of them, Jones-LeCointe and Howe, opted to defend themselves. A second novelty was a demand for the trial to be heard by an all-Black jury, a tactic they borrowed from trials in the United States where American Black Power activists had cited the 14th Amendment granting equal protection under the law.

In the present case, the claim was based on rights enshrined in Magna Carta to a trial by one's peers. This argument was not accepted. However, after rejecting a total of 63 candidate jurors the defendants did finally ensure that two of the 12 jurors were Black. By asking candidates what they understood by the term "black power", the defendants placed their own political stamp on what were judicial proceedings. This trial marked the first judicial acknowledgement of institutional racism within the Metropolitan Police, highlighting how Black activists reframed criminal charges as an opportunity to challenge systemic bias. As evidence emerged, the case turned attention on allegations of brutality and racism in the Metropolitan Police.

After a trial lasting 55 days, and jury deliberation of more than eight hours, all defendants were cleared of the main charge: inciting a riot. Rupert Boyce, Rhodan Gordon, Anthony Innis and Altheia Jones-Lecointe received suspended sentences for lesser offences, including affray and assaulting police officers.

== Legacy ==
In his summing up, the judge, Edward Clarke, said the trial had "regrettably shown evidence of racial hatred on both sides", a statement the Metropolitan Police attempted, unsuccessfully, to have withdrawn. The trial was highly significant in being the first judicial acknowledgement of racial prejudice in the Metropolitan Police, and it inspired other civil rights activists seeking to take on the legal establishment. It also resulted in the government changing procedures related to the empanelling of juries to make it more difficult for defendants to influence it.

Ian Macdonald wrote in Race Today: "The Mangrove Nine trial was a watershed because we learnt through experience how to confront the power of the court, because the defendants refused to play the role of 'victim' and rely on the so called 'expertise' of the lawyer. Once you recognise the defendant as a self-assertive human being, everything in the court has to change. The power and role of lawyers – the advocacy and the case preparation … What all radical lawyers have to decide is whether they want to retain their slice of the traditional lawyers cake or to participate in a bold new experience."

The Franco Rosso and John La Rose documentary film The Mangrove Nine, released in 1973, includes interviews with the defendants recorded before the final verdicts.

A BBC drama about the Mangrove Nine called Mangrove, part of the Small Axe anthology directed by Steve McQueen, premiered at the 2020 New York Film Festival in September 2020, and was shown on BBC One on 15 November 2020.

In a September 2021 episode of the BBC Radio 4 series The Reunion entitled "The Trial of the Mangrove Nine", Kirsty Wark reunited a group of those who in different ways had been caught up in events associated with the trial, including Farrukh Dhondy, Gus John and others.
