= Lorena S. Beese =

American biochemist

- Born: Durham, North Carolina
- Education: Oberlin College; Brandeis University; Yale University
- Spouse: Homme Hellinga
- Scientific career
- Fields: Cancer Research, DNA replication, DNA mismatch repair
- Workplaces: Duke University School of Medicine
- Academic advisors: Thomas A. Steitz

Lorena Beese is a James B. Duke Professor of Biochemistry and Duke Cancer Institute Member. Her research involves structural mechanisms underlying DNA replication and repair, neurodegenerative diseases, cancer, and microbial pathogenesis; X-ray crystallography and cryo-electron microscopy; structure-based drug design; protein-protein and protein-nucleic acid interactions, enzyme mechanisms, chemical biology, protein structure and function.

== Early life and education ==
Beese gained her BA at Oberlin College in Mathematics and Biology, her PhD from Brandeis University in Biophysics, and was a Postdoctoral Fellow at Yale University in Molecular Biophysics and Biochemistry. Her advisor at Yale was Thomas A. Steitz.

== Research and career ==
Beese's research interests include structural biochemistry of DNA replication and human DNA mismatch repair and its connection to carcinogenesis. She is also interested in protein prenylation enzymes as targets for structure-based discovery of anticancer therapeutics and re-purposing of such therapeutics to treat pathogenic fungi and malaria.

In 2008, Beese published her research on Candida albicans geranylgeranyltransferase-1 (GGTase-1) protein structure. Candida albicans is an opportunistic pathogen commonly found in the human microbiota. In immune compromised individual, Candida albicans result in infections that display resistance to anti-fungal therapies. The investigation and discovery of the structure of a GGTases-1 of Candida albicans provides more information for scientists to understand the protein's importance in the survival of the pathogen and suggests its potential to be targeted for disease treatment.

While at Duke University in 2011, Beese, along with her colleague Eugene Wu, investigated the structural adaptation of DNA Polymerase observed during the recognition and correction of incorrect base pairing. Her findings included an intermediate state between the characteristic “open” and “closed” states of polymerase during DNA replication. This intermediary was termed the “Ajar” confirmation. Beese found that inserting an incorrect nucleotide into the growing DNA caused a bend in the helicase of the DNA polymerase. This finding suggests a mechanism by which polymerases are able to detect incorrect base pairing.

Beese had an integral role in identifying the mismatch repair mechanism through which hExo1 identifies DNA damage. In order to maintain the integrity of DNA, enzymes such as Human exonuclease 1 (hExo1) repair damages in DNA. Through her research, Beese found that the hExo1 enzyme binds the DNA near the site of mismatched pairing, and through exonuclease and endonuclease activity, the enzyme is able to assist in the identification and replacement of incorrect base pairs.

By integrating high-resolution X-ray structures with functional studies and computational analyses, the Beese lab has been able to elucidate key features that determine high-fidelity DNA replication. They are using DNA polymerase as a model system to study molecular mechanisms of DNA mis-pair incorporation and action of carcinogens that can lead to mutations.

In 2023, Beese was involved in research investigating the role of intein splicing in controlling enzyme reactions. The team she was on discovered that adding a thermally activated intein domain into an active polymerase site from a structurally different polymerase family could block DNA and RNA template access. In turn, they were able to change the polymerase and reverse transcriptase activities that would normally be controlled by the intein, allowing the intein to be used as a controlled activation mechanism.

Prominent awards include:

- 1994–1997 Searle Scholar Award
- 2005 SER-CAT Outstanding Science Award
- 2005–2015 NIGMS (MERIT) Award
- 2009 Elected to National Academy of Sciences
