= Forever Family (UK) =

Anti-racism organisation in the UK

- Formation: 20 June 2020; 6 years ago
- Founders: Khari McKenzie (alias Raspect Fyahbingh) and Rachelle Emanuel
- Type: Grassroots organisation
- Purpose: Anti-racism, empowering the Black British Community
- Location: United Kingdom
- Affiliations: Black Lives Matter (UK)
- Website: www.foreverfamilyfund.co.uk

Forever Family, also known as the Forever Family Fund and the FF Force, is a grassroots organisation dedicated to collective community security and the protection and upliftment of children. While it is often associated with anti-racism and empowerment movements, Forever Family fosters unity and collaboration across diverse communities. Its mission emphasises safeguarding neighbourhoods, promoting positive youth development, and addressing societal challenges through education, mentorship, and community-led initiatives.

== Background ==
The group was founded by rapper Khari McKenzie (known by the alias Raspect Fyahbingh) and Rachelle Emanuel during the 2020 George Floyd protests in the United Kingdom, which broke out after the murder of George Floyd by police in the United States. The protests were led by activists from the Black Lives Matter movement and resulted in the toppling of statues across the UK of people associated with the transatlantic slave trade.

McKenzie first became politically active in 2011 after the Killing of Mark Duggan by police in Tottenham Hale, London, which sparked the 2011 England riots. He was previously a member of G.A.N.G, a group that would turn up at the site of gang violence incidents in stab-proof vests and call on residents to "reclaim the space".

Forever Family made their first notable public appearance on 1 August 2020 - the anniversary of the Slavery Abolition Act - when members of the group joined the annual Emancipation Day march in Brixton, London, to demand reparations for Britain's role in the enslavement of multiple generations of people from Africa.

== Methods and image ==
Forever Family often engages in forms of direct action, including protest marches, but also responds to incidents of violence against Black British people by establishing a visible presence in the area. In February 2023, a black teenage girl was beaten by white children who were being encouraged to do so by their white parents outside Thomas Knyvett College in Ashford, Surrey. Members of Forever Family, including founder Khari McKenzie (Raspect Fyahbingh), gathered outside the school demanding the resignation of Headteacher Richard Beeson for failing to protect black students from racial abuse, a demand also backed by London rapper Dave.

Members of Forever Family are notable for their distinctive all-black and military-style dress code and use of body armour, which has been compared to that of the former Black Panther Party and the more recent NFAC in the United States. This fact has proven controversial among some of the group's critics, who have stated that Forever Family's methods are illegal under the Public Order Act 1936, which prohibits using political uniforms and organising "usurping the police functions." Former MEP Nigel Farage described Forever Family as "a paramilitary-style force" about their presence at the 2020 Emancipation Day march in Brixton, which Farage also labelled "terrifying" and "divisive."

The Forever Family Fund's website states that the group organises several charitable activities, such as "collecting food, clothing and essential items for those in need." It also offers contacts for "legal support" and promotes the growth and self-sufficiency of Black-owned businesses in the UK. The Forever Family newsletter also indicates that a branch of the organisation exists in Scotland.

== Legal status ==
Forever Family Ltd was registered with Companies House as a private limited company on 20 June 2020, with the nature of the business described as "fund management activities" and "general public administration activities". Rachelle Emanuel was listed as the company secretary, and Khari McKenzie as director and a person with significant control. The company was dissolved via compulsory strike-off on 1 November 2022.

Forever Family UK CIC was registered with Companies House as a Community Interest Company (CIC) on 1 June 2021, with the nature of the business described as "activities of head offices," "educational support services," and "other social work activities without accommodation." This company was similarly dissolved via compulsory strike-off on 20 December 2022.

== Notable members and supporters ==
- David Orobosa Omoregie, a rapper who performs under the name Dave
- Rachelle Emanuel, co-founder and secretary of the Forever Family Fund
- Sasha Johnson, a Black Lives Matter activist who survived being shot in the head in Peckham, London, in May 2021
- Khari McKenzie (also known as Raspect Fyahbingh), a rapper and co-founder of Forever Family
- Dwayne 'Megaman' Vincent, a member of the UK garage collective So Solid Crew

== See also ==
- Black Equity Organisation
- Black Lives Matter in the United Kingdom
- Black power in the United Kingdom
- British Black Panthers
