= Obi Egbuna =

Nigerian writer and activist (1938–2014)

- Born: Obi Benue Egbuna; 18 July 1938; Ozubulu, Anambra State, Nigeria
- Died: 18 January 2014 (aged 75); Washington, DC, United States
- Other name: Obi Benue Joseph Egbuna
- Education: University of Iowa; Howard University
- Occupations: Novelist, playwright and political activist
- Known for: Pioneer of the Black power movement in Britain

Obi Benue Egbuna // (18 July 1938 – 18 January 2014) was a Nigerian-born novelist, playwright and political activist known for leading the Universal Coloured People's Association (UCPA) and being a founding member of the British Black Panther Movement (1968–72) during the years when he lived in England, between 1961 and 1973. Egbuna published several texts on Marxist–Black Power, including Destroy This Temple: The Voice of Black Power in Britain (1971) and The ABC of Black Power Thought (1973).

== Biography ==
=== Early years and education ===
Egbuna was born in Ozubulu, Anambra State, Nigeria on July 18, 1938. He studied at the University of Iowa and Howard University, Washington, DC, moving in 1961 to England, where he lived until 1973.

=== Political activism in Britain ===
In London, Egbuna was a member of a group called the Committee of African Organisations that had roots in the West African Students' Union, and which organised Malcolm X's 1965 visit to Britain. Egbuna participated in events organized by the Caribbean Artists Movement, and in 1966 his play Wind Versus Polygamy was performed at the World Festival of Negro Arts in Dakar, Senegal, where the Pan African Players and the Negro Theatre Workshop (founded in London by Pearl Connor) represented the United Kingdom. He became a pioneer of the Black Power movement in Britain, forming the Universal Coloured People's Association (UCPA) – "the first avowed Black Power group in Britain in August 1967, following Stokely Carmichael's visit" – and speaking at a major anti-Vietnam War rally in October that year. Egbuna also participated in the Antiuniversity of London.

In August 2020, Egbuna's son, Obi Egbuna Jr, spoke candidly to Bryan Knight's Tell A Friend podcast about his father's political activism and the fight against racism in the Britain of the 1960 and 1970s.

Being heavily influenced by Marxism, Egbuna stressed the importance of an international struggle against capitalism, as a part of the global struggle against racial oppression. In a speech from 1967 at Trafalgar Square, London, Egbuna stated: "Black Power means simply that the blacks of this world are out to liquidate capitalist oppression of black people wherever it exists by any means necessary." On 10 November 1967, he launched the Black Power Manifesto, published by the Universal Coloured People's Association. As spokesperson for the group, he claimed they had recruited 778 members in London during the previous seven weeks. In 1968 Egbuna published a pamphlet entitled Black Power or Death.

Egbuna also saw the socialist and communist student movements of the 1960s as problematic to the Black Power cause. Although ideologically rooted in a similar Marxist intellectual tradition, he saw the student organisations as "socialist snobs" who decree from "the premise that only they have read and can understand Marx". This intellectual snobbery was, according to Egbuna, "doing a great harm to the cause they claim to be upholding" by ignoring race as a key reason for oppression of black workers:

Nobody in his right mind disputes that the fact that the White worker is a prey to capitalist exploitation, as well as the Black Worker. But equally indisputable is the fact that the White worker is exploited only because he is a worker, not because he is white, while in contrast, the Black Worker is oppressed, not only because he is a worker, but also because he is Black.

During the 1960s, many sympathisers of Black Power left their socialist and communist student organisations and subsequently started their own Marxist-orientated Black Power organisations, such as Black Socialist Alliance.

As a consequence of the Race Relations Act 1965, incitement of racial violence had become illegal in the United Kingdom. Several members of Egbuna's UCPA were fined under this act. Egbuna was later that year imprisoned accused of threatening to kill police and certain politicians. His play The Agony, which drew on this experience, was staged by London's Unity Theatre in 1970. The cast included Rudolph Walker.

=== Later years ===
Egbuna's last novel, The Madness of Didi, was published in 1980. He died in Washington, DC, on 18 January 2014, aged 75, and a tribute to his life and work was held on Saturday, 1 March 2014, at the Rankin Memorial Chapel, Howard University, Washington, DC.

Egbuna's papers are held at the Schomburg Center for Research in Black Culture, Manuscripts, Archives and Rare Books Division, at the New York Public Library.

== Bibliography ==
Drama:

- The Anthill: A play (London: Three Crowns Books/Oxford University Press, 1965)
- The Agony (1968)

Novels:

- Wind Versus Polygamy (London: Faber & Faber, 1964) (republished in paperback by Fontana Books as Elina, 1978)
- The Minister's Daughter (1975; Fontana paperback, 1985)
- The Madness of Didi (1980)

Short stories:

- Daughters of the Sun and Other Stories (Three Crowns Books, 1970)
- Emperor of the Sea and Other Stories (London: Fontana/Collins, 1974)
- The Rape of Lysistrata (Nigeria: Fourth Dimension Publishers, 1980)
- Black Candle for Christmas (Nigeria: Fourth Dimension Publishers, 1980)

Non-fiction:

- Black Power in Britain (London: UCPA, 1967)
- Black Power or Death (Black Star, 1968)
- The Murder of Nigeria: An Indictment (Panaf, 1968)
- Destroy this Temple: The Voice of Black Power in Britain (London: MacGibbon & Kee, 1971)
- The ABC of Black Power Thought – A Negro Book (1973)
- The Diary of a Homeless Prodigal (Nigeria: Fourth Dimension Publishers, 1976)

== See also ==
- Black Power
- Marxism
