= Darcus Howe =

British broadcaster, writer and campaigner (1943–2017)

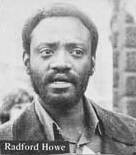
- Born: Leighton Rhett Radford Howe; 26 February 1943; Moruga, Trinidad, British West Indies
- Died: 1 April 2017 (aged 74); Streatham, London, England
- Other names: Radford Howe; Darcus Owusu
- Education: Queen's Royal College
- Occupations: Broadcaster, columnist, activist
- Organization(s): British Black Panthers, Mangrove Nine
- Known for: Race Today, Black on Black, Bandung File
- Spouse: Leila Hassan
- Relatives: Tamara Howe (daughter); Darcus Beese (son); C. L. R. James (uncle)
- Website: darcushowe.org/darcus-howe/

Leighton Rhett Radford "Darcus" Howe (26 February 1943 – 1 April 2017) was a British broadcaster, writer and racial justice campaigner. Originally from Trinidad, Howe arrived in England as a teenager in 1961, intending to study law and settling in London. There he joined the British Black Panthers, a group named in sympathy with the US Black Panther Party.

He came to public attention in 1970 as one of the nine protestors, known as the Mangrove Nine, arrested and tried on charges that included conspiracy to incite a riot, following a protest against repeated police raids of The Mangrove restaurant in Notting Hill, London. They were all acquitted of the most serious charges and the trial became the first judicial acknowledgement of behaviour (the repeated raids) motivated by racial hatred, rather than legitimate crime control, within the Metropolitan Police. In 1981, he was instrumental in organising a 20,000-strong "Black People's Day of Action" in protest at the handling of the investigation into the New Cross house fire, in which 13 black teenagers died.

Howe was an editor of Race Today, and chairman of the Notting Hill Carnival. He was best known as a television broadcaster in the UK for his Black on Black series on Channel 4, his current affairs programme Devil's Advocate, and his work with Tariq Ali on Bandung File. His television work also included White Tribe (2000), a look at modern Britain and its loss of "Englishness"; Slave Nation (2001); Who You Callin' a Nigger? (2004); and Is This My Country? (2006), a search for his West Indian identity. He was a columnist for the New Statesman and The Voice, as well as writing for other national publications including The Guardian.

== Early life, activism and writing ==
Leighton Rhett Radford Howe was born in the village of Moruga in Trinidad, the son of teacher Lucille (née Rudder) and Cipriani Nathaniel Howe, an Anglican priest and headmaster; his mother taught at and his father ran the Eckles Village School at which he was educated. Howe was schooled in Port of Spain at Queen's Royal College (QRC), where he won a scholarship.

At the age of 18, after leaving QRC, Howe moved to England, arriving on the SS Antilles at Southampton on 11 April 1961, after a two-week journey, and taking a train on to London Waterloo station. He intended to study law, but after two years at Middle Temple he left, becoming more involved with journalism. In 1969, he returned to Trinidad, where his cousin (some sources give James as Howe's uncle but records from Howe's archive at the Columbia University established that their shared ancestor, Joshua Rudder, was James's grandfather and Howe's great-grandfather, making them first cousins once removed) and mentor, radical intellectual C. L. R. James, inspired him to combine writing with political activism. A brief spell as assistant editor on the Vanguard, weekly newspaper of the Oilfields Workers' Trade Union, was followed by a return to Britain.

Howe became a member of the British Black Panther Movement, and adopted the nickname "Darcus" around that time. In the summer of 1970, he took part in a protest against the frequent police raids of the Mangrove restaurant in Notting Hill, where he worked on the till. The restaurant had become a meeting place for black people, serving as what Howe called the "headquarters of radical chic". It was raided 12 times between January 1969 and July 1970 by police looking for drugs, and so 150 demonstrators marched on the local police station in protest, a demonstration that ended in violence. Six weeks later, Howe and eight others (the Mangrove Nine) were arrested for riot, affray and assault. In what would come to be considered a landmark case, Howe elected to represent himself. He and four of his co-defendants were acquitted of all charges after a 55-day trial in 1971 at the Old Bailey, which included an unsuccessful demand by Howe for an all-black jury, and fighting in the dock when some of the defendants tried to punch the prison officers. The judge stated that there was "evidence of racial hatred on both sides".

From 1973 to 1985, Howe served as editor of the magazine Race Today (1973–88), which was originally connected with the Institute of Race Relations. As Howe recalled in 2013:

When the institute set up Race Today, it began by publishing mainly academic articles on the colonial territories. It later focused on British immigration, especially the children of the first generation, from India, Pakistan, Africa and the Caribbean. After a shift on the council in a more radical direction, they appointed me, the first black editor. We turned it into a radical black newspaper. We moved it to Brixton, reoriented the whole journal, and worked with ex-Panthers who'd squatted in Brixton, including the writer and activist Farrukh Dhondy. The intention was to be aggressively campaigning, and to 'record and recognise' the emerging struggles in the black community.

The Brixton-based Race Today Collective also included Linton Kwesi Johnson, Barbara Beese, and others. Howe's successor as editor, Leila Hassan, would eventually become his third wife.

In 1977, Howe was sentenced to three months' imprisonment for assault, after a racially motivated altercation at a London Underground Station, but was released upon appeal after protests over his arrest. Linton Kwesi Johnson contributed a song, "Man Free (For Darcus Howe)", to the campaign for his release.

Howe was involved over many years with the Notting Hill Carnival, both as a participant — in 1971 he founded the Renegades steelband, sponsored by Race Today and eventually called Mangrove/Renegades — and as Chair of the Carnival Development Committee, elected in April 1977.

In 1981, Howe was instrumental in organising a 20,000-strong "Black People's Day of Action" in protest at the handling of the investigation into the New Cross house fire, in which 13 black teenagers died; Kehinde Andrews noted in The Guardian: "His key skill, as one of the main figures in the anti-racist, anti-police brutality movement, was to translate the energy and anger of street protests into government action. He had a major impact on Lord Scarman, who was commissioned to investigate the causes of the 1981 riots. The rebellions in Brixton and elsewhere against the sus laws had shaken the nation; the Scarman Report was the first in Britain to take the police force to task for racial bias."

== Broadcasting ==
In 1982, Howe began his broadcasting career on Channel 4's television series Black on Black, was subsequently co-editor with Tariq Ali of Bandung File (1985–91) and later White Tribe, a look at modern-day Britain and its loss of Englishness. Howe continued to write in the New Statesman and fronted the Channel 4 current affairs programme Devil's Advocate (1992–96). He was a keynote speaker at the 2005 Belfast Film Festival's "Film and Racism" seminar and presented his documentary Who You Callin' a Nigger? at the festival.

In October 2005, Howe presented a Channel 4 documentary entitled Son of Mine, about his troubled relationship with his 20-year-old son Amiri, who had been caught handling stolen passports, shoplifting, and accused of attempted rape, of which Amiri was later found not guilty at the Old Bailey.

Howe appeared on the discussion programme Midweek (on BBC Radio 4) to promote the documentary on 19 October 2005 and, live on air, became involved in an angry debate with American comedian Joan Rivers. The dispute began when Howe suggested that Rivers was offended by the use of the term "Black"; Rivers objected strongly to the suggestion that she was racist and accused Howe of having a "chip on his shoulder".

Is This My Country? (Paul Yule, 2006) was a reflection on his life and a search for his West Indian identity in the face of strident calls for assertions of Britishness by the political elite.

Howe was one of several public figures who fell foul of satirist and prankster Chris Morris on Morris's show Brass Eye, in the final episode, "Decline". Instead of a legitimate interview, Morris hurled a volley of degrading insults at him, before quickly apologising and claiming to have mistakenly read out the introduction to Robert Elms.

== 2011 BBC interview ==
Howe was interviewed by Fiona Armstrong for BBC News on 9 August 2011 at the time of the 2011 England riots. During the interview, Armstrong twice referred to him as "Marcus Dowe", then asked: "You are not a stranger to riots yourself, I understand, are you? You have taken part in them yourself." Howe denied this, saying: "I have never taken part in a single riot. I've been part of demonstrations that ended up in a conflict. Have some respect for an old West Indian Negro, and stop accusing me of being a rioter. Because you wanted for me to get abusive, you just sound idiotic—have some respect." The BBC apologised for any offence the interview caused, and said "it had not intended to show him any disrespect".

Asked about the unfolding situation in London, Howe discussed the death of Mark Duggan: "What I am not – what I'm concerned about more than anything else, there's a young man called Mark Duggan. He has parents, he has brothers, he has sisters, and two yards away from where he lives, a police officer blew his head off."

== Marriage, children and death ==
Howe was married three times and had seven children.

Howe was married to the British editor and activist Leila Hassan, who succeeded him as editor of Race Today. The 2005 Channel 4 documentary Son of Mine examines Howe's relationship with his 20-year-old son Amiri Howe, who faced jail for charges related to stolen passports. Howe's daughter Tamara Howe was a director of production for London Weekend Television before moving to the BBC, where she rose to be Controller of Business, Comedy & Entertainment, Television.

Howe also had a relationship with fellow Black Panther and Mangrove Nine member Barbara Beese, and they have a son, Darcus Beese, who is a former president of Island Records.

Howe was diagnosed with prostate cancer in April 2007 and he subsequently campaigned for more men to get tested. He died aged 74 on 1 April 2017, at his home in Streatham, London, where he lived with his wife Leila Howe. An event in his honour, "Tribute to Darcus, Man Free", took place at the Black Cultural Archives on Sunday, 9 April. On 20 April, his funeral service was held at All Saints Notting Hill Church, following the cortege's procession through Brixton, with wreath-laying at the Railton Road building where the Race Today collective was formerly based. Those who gave spoken tributes and eulogies at the church included his daughter Tamara and Farrukh Dhondy. A note of condolence from Jeremy Corbyn was read out.

== Academic legacy ==
Darcus Howe: a Political Biography, by Robin Bunce of Cambridge University and human rights activist Paul Field, was published in 2013 by Bloomsbury Academic, and in a 2017 paperback edition entitled Renegade: The Life and Times of Darcus Howe.

The Darcus Howe Papers – containing "correspondence, writings, interview transcripts, court reports and transcripts, printed material, and audio and video tapes regarding the life and work of journalist and activist, Darcus Howe—a British citizen and native of Trinidad" – are archived at Columbia University Libraries.

== In popular media ==
Howe appears in the 1973 Franco Rosso and John La Rose documentary film The Mangrove Nine.

Actor Malachi Kirby portrays Howe in the Mangrove episode of Steve McQueen's 2020 film anthology/television miniseries Small Axe.

Linton Kwesi Johnson wrote about Darcus Howe in the song “Man Free” on his 1978 debut album Dread Beat an' Blood.

In March 2023, a special memorial edition of Race Today dedicated to Howe was published, linked to what would have been his 80th birthday and coinciding with the launch of the magazine's on-line archive at an event organised by the Darcus Howe Legacy Collective, hosted at Goldsmiths, University of London, at which journalist and broadcaster Gary Younge was the keynote speaker.

== Selected bibliography ==
- Black Sections in the Labour Party, London: Creation for Liberation, 1985. ISBN 978-0947716066
- President Nyerere in Conversation with Darcus Howe and Tariq Ali, London: Creation for Liberation, 1986. ISBN 978-0947716073
- From Bobby to Babylon: Blacks and the British Police, London: Race Today Publications, 1988. ISBN 978-0947716127

As editor

- The Road Make to Walk on Carnival Day: The Battle for the West Indian Carnival in Britain, London: Race Today Collective, 1977.
- With Margaret Busby, C. L. R. James's 80th Birthday Lectures (lectures delivered in I981 at Kingsway Princeton College), London: Race Today Publications, 1984. ISBN 978-0947716011.

== See also ==
- British African-Caribbean community
