= Political blackness =

Concept within racial studies

The notion of "political blackness" arose in the United Kingdom in the 1970s, advocating for "black" as an umbrella term to refer to all people in the UK who were likely to experience discrimination based on skin colour; i.e., anyone who was not white.

== History ==
Following increased immigration to the United Kingdom after the Second World War, most non-white immigrants were designated as "coloured". The notion of "political blackness" became a popular concept from the 1970s onwards, but began to fall out of favour by the early 1990s.

Although seen as an important frame of reference in Britain in linking prejudice against British Asian and Black British people (especially British African-Caribbean people), its applicability was criticised by some as an imposition not allowing for specific British Asian or Black British prides, or implying that the situation of Asian and Black African-Caribbean British people were the same.

== Responses ==
In 2016, students of the University of Kent criticised its student union for promoting UK Black History Month with images of Zayn Malik and Sadiq Khan, who are of Asian heritage. Similarly, Riz Ahmed – a British actor of Pakistani heritage – also used the term "black" to refer to "ethnic minorities, of all backgrounds" in a video for Operation Black Vote. The term is also used in this sense by the Black Female Professors Forum, a primarily-online informal network for highlighting both the presence and absence of senior women professors who are not white.

The Black Students' Campaign is a group that uses the term "black" to refer to all non-white students; in recent years, there have been calls to change the group's name because of this.

== See also ==
- Person of colour, a term originating in the United States that is sometimes favoured by those in Britain to whom it applies.
- Racial classification of Indian Americans, who like British Asians have been classified as Black throughout American history.
- Black, Asian and minority ethnic, a similar contested grouping in the UK
- Global majority, an umbrella term in the UK that has grown in popularity since the 2010s.
- Whiteness studies
- Brown (racial classification)
