= Darcus Beese =

British music industry executive (born 1969)

Darcus Beese OBE
- Born: 1969 (age 55–56)
- Occupation: Music executive
- Employer: Warner Music UK (since 2021)
- Notable credit(s): Island Records (former president and CEO)
- Parents: Darcus Howe (father); Barbara Beese (mother)

Darcus Beese OBE (born 1969) is a British music executive and the former president and chief executive officer of Island Records from his appointment in 2018 till his departure on 3 February 2021. Beese, who has been described by Music Week as "one of the great A&R people of his or any other generation", subsequently joined Warner Music UK as executive vice-president.

== Background ==
Darcus Beese grew up in Fulham, London, the son of Barbara Beese and Darcus Howe. He has said: "The music in my household growing up was definitely a mixture of reggae, soul and calypso. My father was from Trinidad and my mother was of mixed heritage. So, yeah, my upbringing musically ranged from soca to reggae." Leaving school early, Beese worked in a hairdressing salon before eventually being employed in 1993 as a tea boy in the promotions department at Island Records, where he progressed upwards through various jobs, including A&R Director, and in 2008 co-president of the label, until in July 2013 he became president of Island Records. Among his key signings were Amy Winehouse, Jessie J, Taio Cruz, Florence & The Machine, Mumford & Sons, Dizzee Rascal and Rizzle Kicks.

In May 2018, it was announced by Universal Music Group (UMG) that Beese was to become President of Island Records USA, taking over from David Massey, and relocating to New York City. Describing Beese as someone who "has impeccable creative instincts and takes a long-term view of artist development", the chairman and CEO of UMG, Lucian Grainge, said: "Few in the music industry have Darcus's track record of creative and commercial success.... I'm excited to support him in signing, developing and breaking many more artists."

In February 2021, it was announced that Beese was leaving the label and returning to the UK "for personal reasons and to pursue new career opportunities".

It was announced in June 2021 that he would be joining Warner Music UK as executive vice-president and launching a new joint-venture label.

== Awards and recognition ==
In 2013, Beese was made an Honorary Fellow of Falmouth University.

In 2014, Beese was honoured as an Officer of the Order of the British Empire (OBE) in the Queen's Birthday Honours list for services to the UK music industry.

In 2016, he was named European Executive of the Year by MUSEXPO Europe.

In 2011 and 2015, The Guardian named Beese to their list of the most important people in the British music industry.
