= Small Axe (anthology) =

2020 British anthology film series by Steve McQueen

- Genre: Drama
- Created by: Steve McQueen
- Written by: Steve McQueen; Courttia Newland; Alastair Siddons
- Directed by: Steve McQueen
- Composer: Mica Levi
- Country of origin: United Kingdom
- Original language: English
- No. of series: 1
- No. of episodes: 5 (list of episodes)

Production
- Executive producers: Steve McQueen; Tracey Scoffield; David Tanner; Lucy Richer; Rose Garnett
- Producers: Anita Overland; Mike Elliot
- Cinematography: Shabier Kirchner
- Editors: Chris Dickens; Steve McQueen
- Running time: 405 minutes
- Production companies: Turbine Studios; EMU Films; BBC; Amazon Studios

Original release
- Network: BBC One
- Release: 15 November – 13 December 2020

Small Axe is a British anthology film series, created and directed by Steve McQueen. The anthology consists of five films that tell distinct stories about the lives of West Indian immigrants in London from the 1960s to the 1980s. Two episodes of the series were selected into the 2020 Cannes Film Festival. The series premiered on 15 November 2020 on BBC One in the United Kingdom and on 20 November 2020 on Amazon Prime Video in the United States. The title references a proverb – "Small axe fall big tree" or "If you are the big tree, we are the small axe" – that was popularised by Bob Marley in his 1973 song "Small Axe".

== Films ==
Episode	Title	Director	Screenwriters	UK release date	US release date	Runtime
1	Mangrove	Steve McQueen	McQueen and Alastair Siddons	15 November 2020	20 November 2020	128 min.
2	Lovers Rock	Steve McQueen	McQueen and Courttia Newland	22 November 2020	27 November 2020	68 min.
3	Red, White, and Blue	Steve McQueen	McQueen and Courttia Newland	29 November 2020	4 December 2020	80 min.
4	Alex Wheatle	Steve McQueen	McQueen and Alastair Siddons	6 December 2020	11 December 2020	66 min.
5	Education	Steve McQueen	McQueen and Alastair Siddons	13 December 2020	18 December 2020	63 min.

== Production ==
=== Development ===
It has been reported that Steve McQueen began working on the idea for Small Axe in 2010, and that some form of the series was in development since 2012. While the series was initially conceived as a conventional television series with a serialized story, McQueen realized during development that he had sufficient material to make several distinct films. In January 2014, it was announced that he would write and direct an untitled television series for either BBC One or BBC Two about the experience of black people in Britain. In August 2015, it was announced that the series would air on BBC One. In June 2019, Amazon Prime Video was announced to be distributing the series in the United States, with Amazon Studios co-producing. The screenwriters include the British-Caribbean novelist Courttia Newland (author of The Gospel According to Cane, 2013) and Alastair Siddons.

=== Casting ===
In June 2019, it was announced that Letitia Wright, John Boyega, Malachi Kirby, Shaun Parkes, Rochenda Sandall, Alex Jennings, and Jack Lowden had joined the cast of the series. In January 2020, Micheal Ward joined the cast of the series.

== Release ==
Lovers Rock had its world premiere as the opener of the 58th New York Film Festival on 17 September 2020. Mangrove had its world premiere at the festival on 25 September, and Red, White, and Blue on 3 October. Mangrove also opened the 64th BFI London Film Festival on 7 October 2020; Lovers Rock screened at the same festival on 18 October.

The series premiered in the UK on BBC One on 15 November 2020 and in the United States on Amazon Prime Video on 20 November 2020, with one episode released per week on both platforms.

The series received a Blu-ray release by The Criterion Collection on 25 April 2023. The release includes the five films, plus interviews and conversations with director Steve McQueen and various cast and crew members, the 2021 documentary Uprising (co-directed by McQueen and James Rogan), trailers, and an essay by Ashley Clark.

== Reception ==
=== Critical response ===
Critical press reviews of each individual film were positive. All five films received approval ratings of at least 95% on the review aggregator website Rotten Tomatoes, while Metacritic assigned four of the five a score indicating "universal acclaim".

Lovers Rock, in particular, was named the best film of 2020 by the British film magazine Sight & Sound in its poll of 104 critics worldwide; Mangrove came in at 13th.

Film	Rotten Tomatoes rating	Metacritic rating
Mangrove	99% (147 critics; 8.85/10)	90 (27 critics)
Lovers Rock	98% (133 critics; 8.90/10)	95 (27 critics)
Red, White and Blue	97% (88 critics; 8.30/10)	84 (18 critics)
Alex Wheatle	96% (47 critics; 7.40/10)	77 (19 critics)
Education	96% (48 critics; 8.10/10)	87 (15 critics)

=== Accolades ===
Award	Category	Nominee(s)	Result	Ref.
Boston Society of Film Critics Awards	Best Cinematography	Shabier Kirchner (for "Lovers Rock")	Runner-up	
Broadcasting Press Guild	Best Drama Series	Small Axe	Nominated	
Broadcasting Press Guild	Best Actress	Letitia Wright	Nominated	
Broadcasting Press Guild	Best Actor	Shaun Parkes	Nominated	
Broadcasting Press Guild	Best Writer	Steve McQueen, Courttia Newland, Rebecca Lenkiewicz and Alastair Siddons	Nominated	
Broadcasting Press Guild	Breakthrough Award	Amarah-Jae St. Aubyn	Nominated	
British Academy Television Awards	Best Mini-Series	Steve McQueen, Tracey Scoffield, David Tanner, Michael Elliott, Anita Overland	Nominated	
British Academy Television Awards	Best Actor	John Boyega (for "Red, White and Blue")	Nominated	
British Academy Television Awards	Best Actor	Shaun Parkes (for "Mangrove")	Nominated	
British Academy Television Awards	Best Actress	Letitia Wright (for "Mangrove")	Nominated	
British Academy Television Awards	Best Supporting Actor	Malachi Kirby (for "Mangrove")	Won	
British Academy Television Awards	Best Supporting Actor	Micheal Ward (for "Lovers Rock")	Nominated	
British Academy Television Craft Awards	Best Costume Design	Jacqueline Durran	Won	
British Academy Television Craft Awards	Best Director: Fiction	Steve McQueen	Nominated	
British Academy Television Craft Awards	Best Editing: Fiction	Chris Dickens and Steve McQueen	Nominated	
British Academy Television Craft Awards	Best Make Up and Hair Design	Jojo Williams	Won	
British Academy Television Craft Awards	Best Photography & Lighting: Fiction	Shabier Kirchner	Won	
British Academy Television Craft Awards	Best Production Design	Helen Scott	Won	
British Academy Television Craft Awards	Best Scripted Casting	Gary Davy	Won	
British Academy Television Craft Awards	Best Sound: Fiction	Paul Cotterell, James Harrison, Ronald Bailey	Nominated	
British Academy Television Craft Awards	Best Writer: Drama	Alastair Siddons and Steve McQueen	Nominated	
British Society of Cinematographers Awards	Best Cinematography in a Television Drama	Shabier Kirchner (for "Mangrove")	Nominated	
Chicago Film Critics Association Awards	Best Film	Lovers Rock	Nominated	
Chicago Film Critics Association Awards	Best Director	Steve McQueen (for "Lovers Rock")	Nominated	
Chicago Film Critics Association Awards	Best Supporting Actress	Letitia Wright (for "Mangrove")	Nominated	
Chicago Film Critics Association Awards	Best Cinematography	Shabier Kirchner (for "Lovers Rock")	Nominated	
Chicago Film Critics Association Awards	Best Editing	Chris Dickens and Steve McQueen (for "Lovers Rock")	Nominated	
Critics' Choice Television Awards	Best Actor in a Limited Series or Movie Made for Television	John Boyega (for "Red, White and Blue")	Won	
Golden Globe Awards	Best Limited Series or Television Film	Small Axe	Nominated	
Golden Globe Awards	Best Supporting Actor – Television	John Boyega	Won	
Gotham Awards	Breakthrough Series – Long Format	Small Axe	Nominated	
Hollywood Critics Association TV Awards	Best Streaming Limited Series, Anthology Series or Live-Action Television Movie	Small Axe	Nominated	
Hollywood Critics Association TV Awards	Best Supporting Actor in a Limited Series, Anthology Series or Television Movie	John Boyega	Nominated	
Independent Spirit Awards	Best New Scripted Series	Small Axe	Nominated	
London Film Critics Circle Awards	Film of the Year	Lovers Rock	Nominated	
London Film Critics Circle Awards	Director of the Year	Small Axe	Won	
London Film Critics Circle Awards	Supporting Actor of the Year	Shaun Parkes	Won	
London Film Critics Circle Awards	Attenborough Award for British/Irish Film of the Year	Lovers Rock	Nominated	
Los Angeles Film Critics Association Awards	Best Picture	Small Axe	Won	
Los Angeles Film Critics Association Awards	Best Director	Steve McQueen	Runner-up	
Los Angeles Film Critics Association Awards	Best Cinematography	Shabier Kirchner	Won	
Los Angeles Film Critics Association Awards	Best Music	Mica Levi (for "Lovers Rock")	Runner-up	
NAACP Image Awards	Outstanding Directing in a Drama Series	Steve McQueen (for "Mangrove")	Nominated	
New York Film Critics Circle Awards	Best Cinematographer	Shabier Kirchner	Won	
Primetime Emmy Awards	Outstanding Cinematography for a Limited or Anthology Series or Movie	Shabier Kirchner (for "Mangrove")	Nominated	
RTS Programme Awards	Mini-Series	Small Axe	Nominated	
RTS Programme Awards	Actor - Male	Shaun Parkes	Won	
RTS Programme Awards	Writer - Drama	Steve McQueen and Alistair Siddeon	Nominated	
RTS Craft & Design Awards	Director - Drama	Steve McQueen	Nominated	
Satellite Awards	Best Miniseries & Limited Series	Small Axe	Nominated	
Satellite Awards	Best Actor in a Miniseries or TV Film	John Boyega	Nominated	
Satellite Awards	Best Actress in a Miniseries or TV Film	Letitia Wright	Nominated	
Peabody Awards	Entertainment	Small Axe	Won	
