= Crime control =

Methods taken to reduce crime in a society

Crime control refers to methods taken to reduce crime in a society. Crime control standardizes police work. Crime prevention is also widely implemented in some countries, through government police and, in many cases, private policing methods such as private security and home defense. However, the police or security deployment may not necessarily be the best way to prevent a crime from happening.

President Bill Clinton signed the Presidential Decision Directive 42 (PDD-42), issued on October 21, 1995. It got United States government agencies of the executive branch to increase the resources devoted to crime control, achieve more by improving internal coordination, work closer with other international governments to help develop a global response to the threat of international crime not being controlled, and use all legal means available to prevent international crime.
