= Franco Rosso =

British film director (1941–2016)

- Born: 29 August 1941; Turin, Piedmont, Italy
- Died: 9 December 2016 (aged 75)
- Education: Camberwell School of Art; Royal College of Art
- Occupations: Film producer and director
- Notable work: Babylon (1980)

Franco Rosso (29 August 1941 – 9 December 2016) was an Italian-British filmmaker. He is known for making films about Black British culture, and in particular for the 1980 cult film Babylon, about Black Jamaican youth in south London.

== Early life ==
Rosso was born in Turin in 1941. His parents were both workers at a Fiat plant. At the age of eight, he and his parents moved to England, and he was brought up in London. After attending comprehensive school in Battersea, Rosso went on to Camberwell School of Art and the Royal College of Art (at which he was a contemporary of Ian Dury).

He was an assistant on Ken Loach's 1969 film Kes, and Rosso's subsequent career as a filmmaker encompassed feature films, as well as television documentaries and series, working as an editor, producer, director and writer. Following early productions at the Royal College of Art, Rosso made his notable directorial debut with the documentary The Mangrove Nine, scripted by John La Rose and narrated by Andrew Salkey, about the resistance to police attacks on the popular Mangrove restaurant in the early 1970s and the resultant trial of a group of black activists. According to Martin Stellman's obituary of Rosso, The Mangrove Nine film was "so uncompromising in its portrayal of police racism that the BBC delayed its transmission. For several years afterwards, Rosso could not get work with the corporation and firmly believed he had been blacklisted."

In 1981, Rosso won an Evening Standard Award for Most Promising Film-Maker for his drama Babylon, which was backed by the National Film Finance Corporation. It was called by New Britain fanzine "one of the best British films ever made, not just one of the best 'Black' or 'Youth' films".

== Selected filmography ==
- 1967: Rainbows Are Insured against Old Age – Royal College of Art (director)
- 1968: Dream Weaver – Royal College of Art (director)
- 1973: The Mangrove Nine – documentary about the Mangrove Nine (director; co-producer Horace Ové, scripted by John La Rose)
- 1979: Dread Beat an' Blood – documentary for Omnibus (BBC television), featuring Linton Kwesi Johnson (director)
- 1980: Babylon – drama (director, writer)
- 1983: Ian Dury – biopic (director)
- 1983: Salt on a Snake's Tail – BBC TV (director)
- 1984: The Caribbean in Crisis: The West Indies One Year after the Grenada Invasion – documentary for Channel Four (producer)
- 1985: Sixty-Four Day Hero: A Boxer's Tale (director)
- 1986: Struggle for Stonebridge – documentary for 40 Minutes, BBC Two (director)
- 1988: The Nature of the Beast (director)
- 1991: Lucha Libre – for television (director)
- 1995: Money Drugs Lock-up (director)
