= Lola Olufemi =

British writer (born 1996)

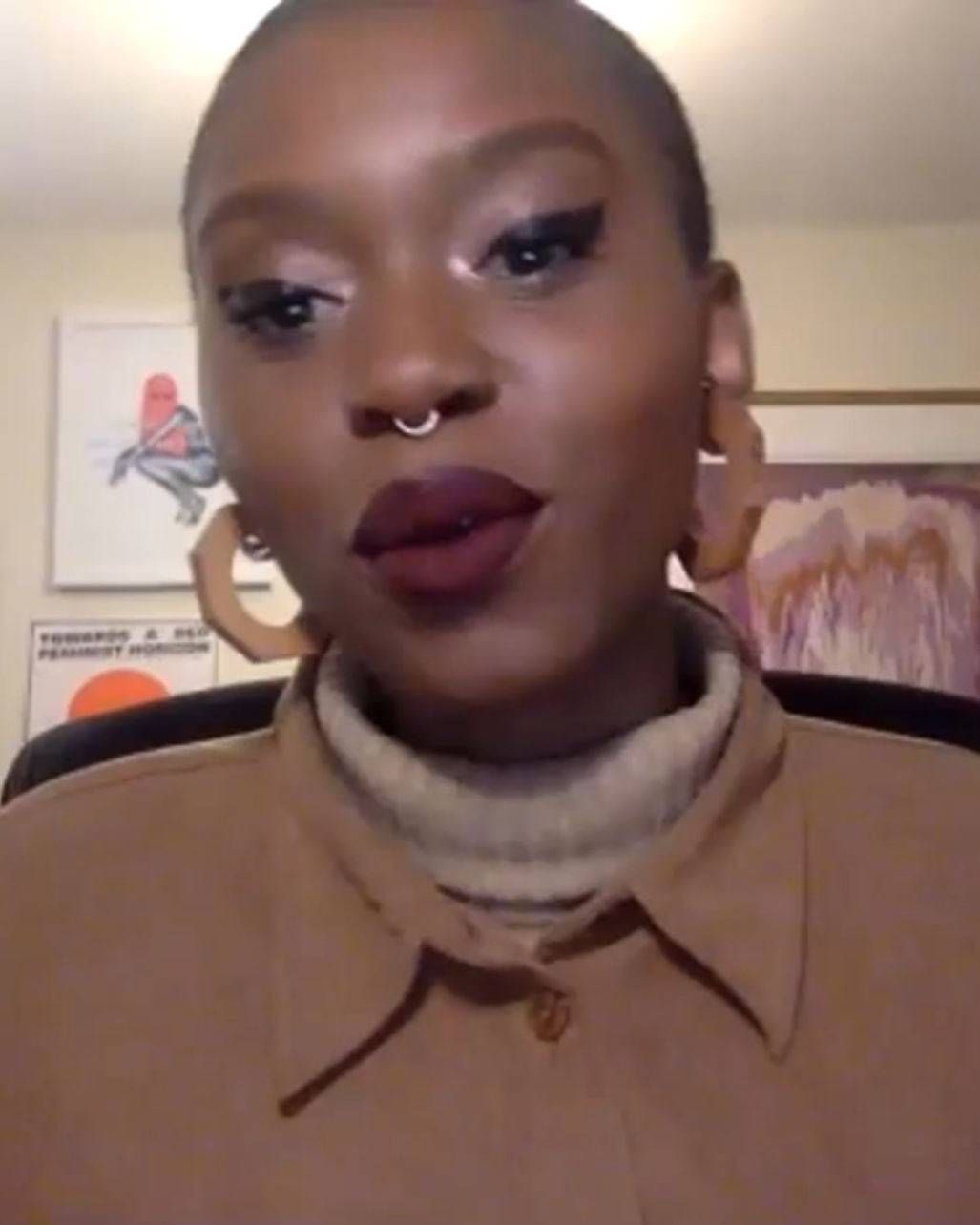
- Olufemi in 2020
- Born: 1996 (age 29–30); London, England
- Education: Selwyn College, Cambridge
- Occupation: Writer
- Years active: 2017–present

Lola Olufemi (/ɒluˈfɛmi/; born 1996) is a British writer. She is an organiser with the Feminist Library in London, and her writing has been published in many national and international magazines and newspapers. She is the author of Experiments in Imagining Otherwise and Feminism, Interrupted: Disrupting Power, and the co-editor of A FLY Girl's Guide to University: Being a Woman of Colour at Cambridge and Other Institutions of Power and Elitism.

== Early life and education ==
Olufemi was born and grew up in London, England, their family home being in Edmonton. She attended Enfield County School and studied English at Selwyn College, Cambridge. She was the Women's Officer for Cambridge University Students' Union, and one of the facilitators of FLY, the university's network for women and non-binary people of colour.

In 2024, she completed her PhD, entitled But... The Luminous Tree: The Uses of the Imagination in Resistant Cultural Production. Her research was funded by the TECHNE AHRC Collaborative Doctoral Studentship with the University of Westminster and Stuart Hall Foundation.

== Work ==
=== Writing and speaking ===
Olufemi has written and spoken on a range of topics including: art and culture; feminism, gender and sexism (including the Women's Strike and Time's Up movements); food equality; climate justice and race; race and racism, including archives of radical Black British activism; and higher education issues, including institutional justice and sexual harassment in universities, and decolonising practices in higher education (for which she was targeted with a "vicious and misleading" sexist and racist harassment by British right-wing press).

Poet Jay Bernard interviewed Olufemi for Housmans Bookshop, and the pair discussed the "internationalist ethos of black feminist movements in the 70s and 80s", connecting feminist struggles such as protests against sexual violence with opposition to settler colonialism.

Olufemi with Che Gossett and Sarah Shin organised a month-long programme of talks and events under the title "Revolution is not a one-time event" in summer 2020. The launch event, hosted by Silver Press on 9 June 2020, took the form of a fundraiser for Black liberation. The fundraiser was hosted by Akwugo Emejulu and featured Che Gossett, Helena Rubinstein, Ru Kaur, Olufemi and Amrit Wilson in conversation.

=== Art ===
Olufemi is a member of "bare minimum", an interdisciplinary, anti-work arts collective. She has been commissioned by Tate Modern to run a feminist workshop as part of a Feminist Library event.

=== Influences ===
Olufemi cites several key feminist, trans-inclusive, and Black feminist thinkers and collectives that have influenced her, in interviews and her writing, including: Angela Davis, Ann Oakley, Assata Shakur, Audre Lorde, the Brixton Black Women's Group, the British Black Panthers, Claudia Jones, the Combahee River Collective, Gail Lewis, the Grunwick Strikers, Judith Butler, Kate Millett, Liz Obi, Olive Morris, OWAAD, Saidya Hartman, Stella Dadzie, Shulamith Firestone, Silvia Federici, Selma James, the Young Lords, and Sylvia Wynter.

== Bibliography ==
- A FLY Girl's Guide to University: Being a Woman of Colour at Cambridge and Other Institutions of Power and Elitism (Verve Poetry Press, 2019), edited with Odelia Younge, Waithera Sebatindira, and Suhaiymah Manzoor-Khan.
- Feminism, Interrupted: Disrupting Power (Pluto Press, 2020).
- "Red", shortlisted for the 2020 Queen Mary Wasafiri New Writing Prize in the Fiction category.
- Experiments in Imagining Otherwise (Hajar Press, 2021).
