= Gerlin Bean =

Jamaican community worker and activist (1939–2025)

- Born: 10 February 1939; Hanover Parish, Jamaica
- Died: 2 February 2025 (aged 85)
- Education: London School of Economics; University of the West Indies
- Occupations: Community worker, activist
- Years active: 1959–?

Gerlin Bean (10 February 1939 – 2 February 2025) was a Jamaican community worker who was active in the radical feminist and Black nationalist movements in the United Kingdom in the 1960s and 1970s. Trained as a nurse, she became a dedicated community activist and social worker, involved in the founding of the Black Women's Action Committee of the Black Unity and Freedom Party, the women's section of the Black Liberation Front, the Brixton Black Women's Group, and the Organisation of Women of African and Asian Descent (OWAAD). Bean's work and activism focused on eliminating discriminatory policies for people of colour, women, and people with disabilities. She fought for equal educational opportunity, fair wages, adequate housing, and programmes that supported families, such as counselling services, child care, and health care.

In 1983, Bean left England when Zimbabwe gained its independence and worked there on development programmes for women and children for five years. She later returned to Jamaica and focused on women's and children's issues there too. She was the managing director of 3D Projects, a charity that provided assistance programmes for children with disabilities and their families. She has been involved in the development of schools to assist children and in other community education programmes regarding disability. Bean has also served on the St. Catherine's Parish Council. Her activism has been celebrated by activities arranged for the UK Black History Month festivities, such as the 2014 exhibit "400 Years of African Women Resistance Leaders" in Islington, and a 2017 sculpture of the clenched fists of Black women activists that was exhibited at the Guildhall Art Gallery in London.

== Background ==
Bean was born on 10 February 1939 in Hanover Parish, Jamaica, to a couple who were farmers. The rural setting taught her about communal living and instilled the values of mutual aid in the community. She trained as a general and psychiatric nurse after moving to Surrey, England, at the age of 19. When she turned 20 in 1960, she had a daughter, Jennifer, but broke off her engagement to her daughter's father. From the time Jennifer was six months old, Bean arranged foster care for her with a local family so that her child's life would remain stable whilst she worked. Bean earned a bachelor's degree in Social Science and Administration at the London School of Economics and in 1995 completed a master's degree in Public Health at the University of the West Indies in Mona, Jamaica.

Bean died on 2 February 2025, at the age of 85.

== Career and activism ==
=== England (1960–1982) ===
==== Social work and community development ====
After several years of working as a nurse in London, Bean left the field of medical care and began working as a community development and youth activist. She helped set up the 70s Coffee Bar in Paddington, which was organised by the Westminster City Council as a youth activities and counselling centre. Later, she left Paddington and moved to Brixton to found the Gresham Youth Project. In 1969, the Caribbean Education and Community Workers' Association, based in North London, organised a conference to evaluate how West Indian children were faring in the British school system. A paper presented at the symposium by Bernard Coard demonstrated the systemic bias of administrative policies, which routinely placed Caribbean children in special classes for students with learning disabilities. Parents were outraged at the report's conclusion that their children were considered intellectually inferior because of their race.

Parents from Brixton met to discuss a pioneering solution brought forward by Bean, Reverend Anthony Ottey, and the teacher Ansel Wong to hold supplementary schools to help children with their homework and reading. The plan also aimed to empower parents by teaching them how to interact with teachers and administrators and be more involved in their children's education. The trio, who worked together at the Gresham Youth Project, founded the Afiwe School, which among other services sent volunteers to accompany parents to school meetings, provided tutoring services, and assisted in outreach with schools and tuition solutions. Bean, Ottey, and Wong also provided information to the Lambeth Council for Community Relations, which launched a temporary housing and counselling service for runaway youth.

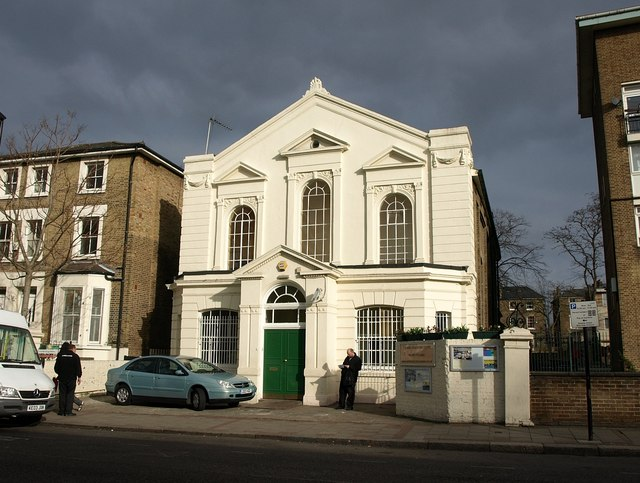
The Karibu Centre at 7, Gresham Road in Brixton (formerly the Abeng Centre). Number 5 is on the left

Bean, Gloria Cameron, and Mabel Carter began meeting as the West Indian Parents Action Group (WIPAG) around 1971, but the group was not formalised until 1974. The goal of the organisation was to address under-achievement by Black children in the British school system and was particularly focused on early childhood education that gave training to children before they entered formal schooling. Bean was also involved with Wong, Lu Garvey, and Tony Soares in 1972 in establishing a cooperative in the basement of 61 Golborne Road in Kensal Town, where community experts were able to train unemployed young people in various skills, including barbering, electrical repair, and typesetting. Around the same time, Wong and Bean created the Abeng Centre in Brixton. The staff of the facility worked in conjunction with the Afiwe School, providing advice and counselling services, vocational training, and serving as a youth club.

After searching for a suitable property, WIPAG secured a lease from the Housing Directorate of Lambeth in 1976 for 7 Canterbury Crescent, an abandoned terraced house. Delays in funding for staff training and equipment pushed the opening of the facility back to January 1978. Within a short period of time, 24 children were enrolled and more than 80 children were on the waiting list. Problems with the building and the need for a bigger space led Bean and Cameron to search for a more suitable location. They found a building at 3 & 5 Gresham Road and negotiated a 30-year lease at a peppercorn rent with the Lambeth Council. The planning authority granted WIPAG renovation permission in 1979 and in 1981 the facility was given official charitable status. The new nursery school officially opened in 1983, the year Bean moved to Zimbabwe.

==== Political activism ====
Around 1966, Bean began to attend meetings with the Gay Liberation Front in London. While she recognised that some people viewed homosexuality as a threat to families, she maintained people should be free to be who they were. In 1970, the Black Unity and Freedom Party (BUFP) was formed and Bean began pressing for the group to include a women's platform. She had been inspired by her attendance at the Women's Liberation National Conference held that year at Ruskin College, Oxford University. There were 600 women at the meeting and Bean was one of only a few Black women attendees. (Note: Several sources indicate the presence of only two Black women. These sources include A. S. Francis, and Bean, who said in an interview that only herself and Pat Smith of Essex University attended; however, Natalie Thomlinson, a historian at the University of Reading, notes that video recorded at the Ruskin conference shows Bean and "several Black women".) Before the BUFP was a year old, Bean had founded the Black Women's Action Committee, as its women's section. She specifically wanted to focus on Black women's issues because white feminists addressed different issues, such as abortion and being paid for housework. These were not central problems for Black women who sought to be paid sufficient wages to provide child care for their children, needed adequate housing and educational opportunities, and called for protection from racism and violence.

Bean published a pamphlet Black Women Speak Out in 1970–71. Despite this overt expression of the point of view of Black women and the space afforded to women by the BUFP to "express themselves politically", the scholar Rosalind Eleanor Wild notes that some members continued to "feel very constricted". The activist and academic Harry Goulbourne has also observed that the BUFP was "extremely authoritarian, extremely intolerant". When the Black Liberation Front (BLF), a group with stronger socialist ties than a strictly Black nationalist focus, was formed in 1971, Bean left the Black Unity and Freedom Party. She founded a women's section of the BLF and began publishing "Sister's Column" in the organisation's Grassroots newsletter.

The three main black power movements — the British Black Panthers, the Black Liberation Front and the Black Unity and Freedom Party — all initially attracted women members, but women often found that their issues were not taken seriously. According to scholars such as John Narayan and W. Chris Johnson, women activists in these movements often felt that they were the "oppressed of the oppressed" and "most exploited" because they were impacted by the same racial and class discrimination as Black males, but also had to face sexism from both white and Black men.

By 1973, the British Black Panthers had dissolved and women in the other two political groups stopped gathering. In 1974 Bean, Zainab Abbas and Wong formed part of the British delegation to the Sixth Pan-African Congress, which was hosted in Dar es Salaam, Tanzania. The British delegates' address to the Congress reiterated the commitment of Black Britons to the liberation of Africans, people of African descent, and others throughout the world, from colonial policies, imperialism, and racism.

==== Women's rights ====
In 1973, Bean joined with Abbas, Beverley Bryan, Olive Morris, Liz Obi and other activists to found the Brixton Black Women's Group (BBWG). Though they were accused by some male activists of splitting the Black struggle, the women believed that their issues were not being heard and wanted to find solutions by working with other women, including women's groups in Africa. Gail Lewis, a BBWG member, stated in a 2019 interview in Feminist Theory:

Activism was understood in a singular way, even if it happened in a multiplicity of places/spaces of life: work, the courtroom, the police station, the school, the local and central state. …It happens in all our kitchens, because whether they're from the Caribbean or from the African Continent or South Asia the women were leading from the kitchen. And by 'the kitchen' I mean an understanding that the lived realities and social relations of the kitchen were as much about politics as everything else, including the bedroom. And I also mean that 'the kitchen' was and is a place of political learning and theory-making. …[I]n that kind of register, and then of course we would – we being me, and Avtar [Brah] who was with Southall Black Sisters then, and Gerlin Bean, and all these people – would raise these questions with the guys. In Brixton we had a very tense relationship with Race Today, around feminism really, but they didn't just write us off, and it wasn't really hostile.

Of paramount importance to the women were the lack of available housing; Sus laws, which allowed police to stop and search anyone who might be suspected of having the intent to commit an offence; and education. Sus law arrests were often directed at Black youth and police at the time were given broad latitude in interpreting the terms "suspect" and "intent". (Note: The Home Affairs Committee on Race Relations and a subcommittee from Immigration conducted a study between 1979 and 1980 that found that Black youth were disproportionately targeted by the Sus laws and that only six police divisions actually used the laws as a basis for arrest. Those that did use the laws had an average 78 per cent conviction rate throughout England and Wales. However, London's conviction rate was 82 per cent. The report also pointed out that the police were allowed to use their own judgement rather than relying on independent evidence or witness accounts. Public outcry and the report itself eventually led to reforms beginning in 1984.) The Brixton Black Women's Group worked to obtain state funding to expand the Sabarr Bookshop, using the store as a link to provide educational materials both for schools and activists.

In 1978, Bean, Stella Dadzie and Morris met with students from Ethiopia and Eritrea, who were attending the London School of Economics. Together, they formed the Organisation for Women of Africa and African Descent. The formation of this group was identified by historians Line Nyhagen Predelli and Beatrice Halsaa as "a watershed in the history of Black women's rights activism" in their 2012 publication Majority-Minority Relations in Contemporary Women's Movements: Strategic Sisterhood. Within six months, the group asked Asian activists to join them and the name changed to the Organisation of Women of African and Asian Descent, known as OWAAD. This umbrella organisation allowed Black — from the political stance (Note: The term "politically Black" as used by 1970s British women's groups meant anyone of or within the diaspora of African, Asian, Latina/o, or Middle Eastern descent, who was forced by society to face discrimination on the basis of their identity, including bi-racial women, as well as indigenous women.) — women's groups throughout England to work together on common issues. As one of the first Black feminist groups that was politically formalised, OWAAD gave members experience in how to organise their communities, battle against discrimination, and educate themselves and the community about government policies. Bean served as the chair of OWAAD's first conference held in 1979 at the Abeng Centre. That same year, Bean and Dadzie went to Chicago, Illinois, to develop networks with the National Alliance of Black Feminists.

=== Zimbabwe (1982–1988) ===
From 1982, Bean focused on establishing programmes to assist women and children in Zimbabwe. Then, after Zimbabwe gained its independence from the UK, she moved to Africa in 1983. She worked with women to develop plans for family health and children's welfare. As a volunteer for the Catholic Institute for International Relations in Harare, Bean recruited doctors and nurses from the UK, encouraging them to move to Zimbabwe and work in rural areas to improve education and health facilities and programmes. She maintained ties with WIPAG, sharing educational materials from Africa with the nursery school on Gresham Road in London.

=== Jamaica (1988–2025) ===
Bean returned to Jamaica in 1988 and studied for a degree in public health. In 1994, she became the deputy director at the Project Dedicated to the Development of Persons with Disabilities, known as 3D Projects, a charitable organisation that provided services for persons with disabilities and support for their families. She co-wrote a chapter titled "Mobilising Parents of Children with Disabilities in Jamaica and the English Speaking Caribbean" with Marigold J. Thorburn for a book published in 1995. Within four years, Bean was serving as a project director of 3D Projects, which was headquartered in Spanish Town, in Saint Catherine Parish, and by 2002 had become its managing director. As director of that development, in 2005, she initiated an innovative programme called "Skills For Life" to teach sex education to people with disabilities and their carers. The programme was designed to reduce the taboos of talking about sex and minimize the vulnerability and potential for sexual exploitation of persons with disabilities. Supported with funds provided by the United Nations International Children's Emergency Fund, the programme was connected to a treatment project for young people in Jamaica who were living with HIV/AIDS. In 2009, she established a school in Saint Catherine Parish to provide early education opportunities for children with disabilities.

Bean participated in the University of the West Indies lecture series titled "That Time In Foreign — Life Stories of Jamaican England Returnees", which ran from 2006 to 2007. She has been a presenter for numerous community seminars touching on issues of disability, family violence, HIV/AIDS education, and overall health and support for people with disabilities. She worked as the chair of the gender section on the Council for Voluntary Social Services in 2007 and served as a member of the Saint Catherine Parish Committee from 2008 to 2011. She has worked with international organisations such as the Committee on the Rights of the Child and UNESCO, national policy boards and regional policy groups of the Disabled Peoples' International in order to create and design inclusive policies for children and persons with disabilities.

In 2020, Bean was one of the few Black feminists who participated in the Oxford International Women's Festival at Oxford University, which was organised to honour the 50th anniversary of the 1970 Ruskin Conference at Oxford. The event was criticised for being predominantly white and middle-class and Bean told The New Yorker that, as a Black woman, she "couldn't really pick on the relevance" of the conference.

== Legacy ==
Bean is thought of by many activists as a mentor who introduced them to and guided them in their political development. Among these are Abbas, Dadzie, Ama Gueye, and Gail Lewis. When the book The Heart of the Race (1985) was in the planning stages, Bean worked with Dadzie and Bryan to ensure that it involved as many varied experiences of women activists as possible and to show that they had united in the common cause to resist economic exploitation, imperialism, racism, and sexism. When the Remembering Olive Collective was formed to gather materials in commemoration of Olive Morris, Bean donated her personal photographs and memorabilia of her friend to the archive. The Olive Morris Collection was made available to the public in 2009 and is housed at the Lambeth Archives in South London.

Bean has been the subject of two papers about her involvement radical feminism presented by W. Chris Johnson of the University of Toronto. Her activism in Britain has been recognised in UK Black History Month celebrations, such as the 2014 exhibit "400 Years of African Women Resistance Leaders" hosted by Black History Walks in Islington and a 2017 sculpture, A Fighters' Archive, by Wijnand De Jonge, which was exhibited at the Guildhall Art Gallery in London. The sculpture featured bronze casts of the clenched fists (to represent boxing or fighting) of 15 Black women activists, including Bean. The castings were made live with each of the women.

In 2023, a book-length biography of Bean by A. S. Francis, Gerlin Bean: Mother of the Movement, was published by Lawrence & Wishart.

== Selected works ==
- Bean, Gerlin; Thorburn, Marigold (1995). "Mobilising Parents of Children with Disabilities in Jamaica and the English Speaking Caribbean". In O'Toole, Bryan; McConkey, Roy (eds.). Innovations in Developing Countries for People with Disabilities (PDF). Chorley, Lancashire: Lisieux Hall Publications. pp. 105–120. ISBN 978-1-870335-18-8. Archived (PDF) from the original on 5 November 2018.
- Bean, Gerlin (2000). "Politics and the State: Caribbean". In Kramarae, Cheris; Spender, Dale (eds.). Routledge International Encyclopedia of Women: Global Women's Issues and Knowledge. Vol. III. Identity Politics—Publishing. New York, New York: Routledge. pp. 1577–1580. ISBN 978-0-415-92091-9.
