= Women's liberation movement in the United Kingdom =

The women's liberation movement in the UK has consisted of a diverse, and often interconnected, group of individuals, collectives, publishing houses, and protests through the 20th century and after. The movement emerged from earlier developments in women's and workers' liberation and civil rights in the UK, including equal suffrage ideologies, and proto-feminist writing, and generated new movements in feminist, queer, and anti-racist activism in the UK into the late 20th and 21st centuries. The UK women's liberation movement is characterised by organising on the grounds of intersections between women's rights and other issues, for instance workers' rights, racism and ethnic discrimination, religion, and social justice.

== Key issues ==
The Women's liberation movement in the UK was spurred on by events within the nation and globally which forced women to think in different ways about their political lives. Informal or grassroots groups emerged to tackle a range of issues, with new members to formal WLM groups recruited through consciousness-raising sessions. US-based writing was key to some developments in the movement, with Redstocking activist, Kathie Sarachild's articles used by women to analyze issues impacting their own lives and question whether those challenges were broadly effecting other women, giving each woman a personal stake in the outcome of the movement. Women who joined leftist movements felt that feminist issues were relegated to the sidelines, leading to specific campaigns led by women, with queer women and women of colour creating further spaces to address intersectional oppression.

=== Worker and domestic carer rights ===
Two important events, the Dagenham Ford Plant strike by women machinists in 1968 over pay inequality, and a campaign launched the same year by women in Hull over local fishermen's safety, led to a desire for women throughout the nation to organise on workers' rights. The Power of Women and the Subversion of the Community (1972) by Selma James and Mariosa Dalla Costa examined the place of women in terms of paid and unpaid labor. The book led to several chapters of the Wages for housework (WFH) campaign in Britain and other countries.

=== Reproductive rights ===
Abortion was a unifying issue for liberationists throughout the nation. The British Abortion Act of 1967 was passed to eliminate unsupervised primitive and unhygienic procedures and had little to do with women's rights to govern their own bodies. From the emergence of the WLM in Britain activists felt the importance of shifting the debate to self-determination. In 1971 the British edition of Our Bodies, Ourselves, originally written by the Boston Women's Health Book Collective, was edited and published by Angela Phillips and Jill Rakusen in England, becoming an important text, urging women to become familiar with their own bodies.

In 1975, the National Abortion Campaign (NAC) formed to defend abortion rights, advocate for further improvements and extensions of reproductive rights, and promote awareness of family planning services and contraceptives. Distrust between NAC, unions and WLM activists led to several fissures, but despite the uneasy alliance the groups worked together and there was some fluidity with activists participating in multiple factions for the cause.

A series of proposals were introduced in the 1970s, starting with James White’s 1975 bill to restrict abortion on the basis of gestation. In June 1975, NAC staged a demonstration that attracted between 15,000 and 20,000 people. NAC fought against various House Of Commons' Bills that were intended to restrict abortion rights, creating alliances with organisations that worked with "other oppressed and exploited groups".

Bill Benyon’s 1977 bill to not only limit abortion based upon gestation time but to give medical professionals an opt-out to refuse; and then in 1979, a bill introduced by John Corrie to restrict not only gestation but the grounds on which abortion could be attained. Further complicating the debate was the paucity of National Health Service facilities throughout the UK, giving women in southern England readily available abortion centers, which were lacking in other areas of the nation. Though there were a wide variety of views among individual liberationists on the topic, the movement was in favor of women's autonomy over their own bodies.

There were conflicts within the WLM in how they approached the subject of abortion on England. Women in the WLM criticised labor unions for not going far enough in political support for free abortions on demand. Nevertheless, the Trade Union Congress (TUC) and the NAC along with the Committee in Defence of the 1967 Act (CoOrd) planned an October 1979 march in support of abortion rights. The march was the largest pro-abortion march in the country and was part of the Campaign Against the Corrie Bill (CACB). The differences between the organisers of the pro-abortion march led to an "angry clash" with radical feminists from the London Women's Liberation and Women's Aid holding up the parade because they felt they, not the other organisations should lead it. NAC was criticized by some feminists for working with male bureaucracies, but maintained a policy that all allies, regardless of their roots, who were working against the Corrie Bill to restrict abortion rights were critical to defeat the bill.

=== Violence against women ===
Another critical area of work during the period focused on violence against women. Out of consciousness raising sessions, women wanted to find means to combat violence and bring the problem into the public sphere.

In 1972, one of the first shelters for victims of domestic violence was set up in England. It was called Chiswick Women's Aid and was largely steered by Erin Pizzey. The first rape crisis centre in England and Wales was opened in 1973. The Bristol Women's Centre opened that same year and one of the services they offered was pregnancy testing, vital when no self-testing existed in the period. They also had a space to offer emergency shelter to "battered women", as victims of violence were called at the time. In other areas, women's centres became hubs for activists in the movement, for example, the centre in Norwich had meeting space for consciousness-raising groups and training, provided advice services on a variety of issues like health, housing, and marriage, as well as offering pregnancy tests. In Brighton, the women's centre, opened in 1974, was next door to the women's shelter, allowing women the pretext of going to the centre, when they were actually fleeing violence. By 1979, more than forty women's centres offered a variety of services throughout the country.

The Women's Aid Federation of England was founded by liberationists in 1974 to specifically work on the issues of domestic violence, with branches established in each of the four countries of the UK. The central body was critical for networking, as well as attaining government funds to assist with the work. In 1977, the British edition of Susan Brownmiller's Against Our Will was published and became an influential text, showing how rape had been weaponized throughout history. In response liberationists throughout the UK worked to shift the focus away from women's behaviour toward the perpetrator. Through establishment of rape crisis centres, they led the effort to provide support to victims and campaigned for change, publishing articles to increase awareness among the public.

After a serial rapist attacked and killed five women in West Yorkshire with little response from the police, liberationists in Leeds organized the Leeds Rape Crisis Centre and planned a conference to discuss violence against women. They organized the first Reclaim the Night march in 1977 to challenge the idea that women should stay inside after dark in order to avoid rape and assault. Reclaim the Night protests spread to Bolton and Brighton and a national march was held in London on 20 January 1979. The Guardian reported in 1979 that the marches had had "little attention except for a few sneers and weak jokes". However, the marches took place in 12 locations in England and involved hundreds of women. Reclaim the Night inspired the Take Back the Night movement in the United States.

In 1979, the Southall Black Sisters formed to address violence against women and address issues within the black and Asian communities. Based on a liberationist model, they offered consciousness-raising discussions, counseling services and information in a multi-lingual format.

=== Race, ethnicity, and sexuality ===
The women's liberation movement in the UK was concurrent with, and intersected with, wider movements for political rights for marginalised people. Important figures in the women's right's movement were active in lobbying for rights for lesbian, gay, trans, and queer people in the United Kingdom, and dedicated groups and protests were organised against discrimination faced by women of African and Asian descent, Irish women, and women who organised under politically black identies. That is not to say that all UK women's liberation groups were intersectional: in 1985 the London-based 'Black Feminist Newsletter' criticised the general WLM movement for being "racist because it does not take seriously the experiences of non-white women".

=== Peace and anti-war activism ===
Student activists in France and the UK were involved in protests over Apartheid and the Vietnam War, radicalizing them on other issues. The Greenham Common Peace Camp was established in 1981, beginning with women from Wales and growing to include hundreds of women across 19 years.

=== Mental health ===
The Women's Therapy Centre, founded to provide counseling and help with mental health issues, was established in London in 1976 by Susie Orbach and Luise Eichenbaum.

== Conferences and collectives ==
=== National Women's Liberation Movement ===
The first National Women's Liberation Movement Conference, attended by around 600 women took place in Britain, for three days, from 27 February 1970, at Ruskin College. At the conference the liberationists laid out their focus areas, which included child care, equal education and opportunity, pay equity, and reproductive rights.

NWLM Conferences throughout Britain occurred at varied locations, including Sheffield (June 1970), Skegness (1971), Manchester (March 1972), London (November 1972), Bristol (1973), Edinburgh (1974), Manchester (1975), Newcastle (1976), London (1977) and Birmingham (1978). Though changing the location was meant to unify the women, it led to feelings in some quarters that the long journeys to nationwide conferences were marginalizing women from other parts of the country. At the 1974 conference of the WLM in Edinburgh two additional goals—economic and legal independence for women and the right to autonomy over their sexuality, free from discrimination—were adopted. At the eighth and final conference, held in 1978 in Birmingham, liberationists added a demand for freedom from violence.

By the end of the 1970s the movement had grown so large that it was difficult to sustain the personal and individual aspects which characterized the early movement. Conferences in Britain numbering near 3,000 participants made it difficult for individual activists to have a say in shaping policy or in discussions. Fragmentation on issues which were important to their personal political perspectives, was common for activists in the later part of the movement. In the drive to move from theory to action, liberationists began working on single-issue campaigns to ensure that gains which had been made were not rolled back. In addition, as the state had reformed many policies toward women and political and economic situation had shifted dramatically, activists felt a need to shift the way that they engaged with the state and public.

=== Black British and British-Asian collectives ===
In 1973, black British women organised the Brixton Black Women's Group to focus on education and contraceptive issues in their community. Women who were former British Black Panthers, such as Olive Morris, Beverly Bryan and Liz Obi, were involved in this group. The organisation was the first black women's group in the UK. Morris also helped start other women's groups such as the Manchester Black Women's Co-operative, the Black Women's Mutual Aid Group, and a self-help bookstore, the Sarbarr Bookshop.

Members of several organisations came together to form the Organisation of Women of Asian and African Descent (OWAAD). OWAAD formed in 1978 and in March 1979 sponsored a conference, where around 250 met to talk about the multiple issues they faced based on their gender, race and class. Many of the members were immigrants from various British colonies and were concerned with the impact of immigration laws on their communities. Founding a journal, FOWAAD, with the purpose of keeping women involved connected and informed, one of their first direct actions was a sit-in at Heathrow Airport to protest virginity tests given to women upon entering the UK.

The Southall Black Sisters was founded in 1979.

== Literature and publishing ==
Writing about women's history became very important during the women's liberation movement in the UK. Large and small press publications and pamphlets were created at or following conferences, and were linked to collectives across the UK.

=== Spare Rib ===
Spare Rib was one of the longest-running magazines emerging from the women's liberation movement in the UK. It was established in 1972, folded in 1993, and has been digitised by the British Library.

=== Black feminist publishing ===
The journal FOWAAD was founded by OWAAD with the purpose of keeping women involved connected and informed.

Sheba Feminist Press opened in 1980, with the purpose of expanding printing services to women and translating works from other languages to English. They were accused of spreading erotica or lesbian propaganda by Conservatives in the government.

Other small presses vital to black feminist activism included Mukti (magazine), a multi-language publication by an Asian women's collective; and Speak Out published by Brixton Black Women's Group.

=== Regional publications ===
When publications supposedly representative of all groups and subgroups in the country appeared to be London-centric, activists in the north felt alienated. During the 1975 conference in Manchester, liberationists decided to create the Women’s Information and Referral Service (WIRES), which both produced a newsletter for women in Leeds and York, but acted as a news service to distribute information to the other groups and subgroups of liberationists throughout the nation.

=== Feminist books ===
In 1970, British feminist Germaine Greer published her book, The Female Eunuch, which garnered international acclaim from feminists on an international scale. In 1971 Juliet Mitchell's Woman's Estate was released and extracts of the book were widely disseminated and discussed in local consciousness raising sessions. Topics of relationships, marriage and sexuality were often discussed in groups, evaluating duty, domestic life and women's sphere in ways which allowed women to build confidence and share things like homosexuality or abuse, which had previously been taboo subjects.

== Women and gender studies in the UK ==
=== Education courses ===
In the 1960s-1970s, Women's Studies and Gender Studies courses were formalised in adult, further, and higher education at colleges and universities in the UK. Juliet Mitchell created the first course named ‘Women's Studies’ at the Anti-University in 1968, with the first MA launching at Kent in 1980.

To assist women with education and bring women to the movement, many WLM members taught courses with the Workers' Educational Association (WEA). Some of these began as courses on the movement and then became the foundation of university classes of women's studies. Activists in Norwich gave talks to church groups, members of the Housewives Register and at Women's Institutes, but in the conservative climate were less bold than activists in other areas. Brighton's liberationists ran a successful course on the issues of the movement in 1978 and were asked to re-run it the following year.

=== Archives ===
Archives and special collections with significant holdings related to WLM in the UK include the Women's Library at the London School of Economics, the British Library, the Black Cultural Archives, the Feminist Library, London, Manchester Working Class Movement Library, and Glasgow Women's Library.

The 'Women Activists of East London' collection of 37 interviews, which cover topics including "gender violence, the labour movement, racism, environment and peace movements between 1888 and 2016" is held by the Bishopsgate Institute.

In 2018, the East End Women's Museum and Hackney Museum organised the exhibition 'Making Her Mark' bringing together stories of women-led activism in Hackney.

== Regional organising ==
=== England ===
The WLM movement emerged as groups of women took part in local campaigns or more traditional lobbies and marches in support of civil rights, peace and the New Left. Their activities were triggered by a period of rapid social and cultural change in the 1960s and 1970s. In addition to WLM meetup centres in private houses and community centers, magazines, leaflets and posters were published by the women who gathered there. "Consciousness raising" groups appeared in the early 1970s, where women talked about their own life experiences together in different locations throughout London. Women were also able to recognize the unpaid labor that women do every day, including housework, emotional labor and care-giving. The first national WLM conference took place in late February and early March 1970 at Oxford. There were more than 600 women in attendance where they discussed four primary issues: Equal pay, equal education and job opportunities, free contraception and abortion on demand and free 24 hour nurseries.

In November 1970, protesters went to Royal Albert Hall to protest the Miss World pageant and challenge the idea of women being judged by their physical appearance. Protesters had fliers and shouted, "We're not beautiful, we're not ugly, we're angry!" This protest was organised by Jane Grant and protesters threw out "leaflets, bags of flour and smoke bombs". Several of the women, including Jenny Fortune, who had brought a "busload of women from Essex University", were arrested and conducted their own defence in court. The protesters, numbering around 50 or so women, were fined 100 pounds and the Women's Liberation Network paid the fines for the women. The Guardian called the protest a "galvanising moment in the women's liberation movement". An earlier, smaller protest of 50 women who called themselves the Women's Liberation Workshop, had taken place the year before in 1969.

The Women's Liberation Network formed in north London in the early 1970s, a WLM group began in Bolton in 1970 with three members, a group formed in Norwich, as did one in Bristol. Groups started publishing newsletters to inform activists of developments and by the mid-1970s most towns and cities throughout England had a group publishing about local WLM happenings. The newsletters were critical as many families still did not have home telephones. Spare Rib was launched in July 1972 and became popular throughout the UK. Other English publications which became important included Shrew, Women's Report and Women's Voice. Women involved in the WLM in England felt that it was a time "of enormous innocence, enthusiasm and creative power, when small groups of women were forming across the country, talking about their circumstances, and feeling the rush of recognition as they realised they weren't alone in their frustrations".

In the late 1970s, revolutionary feminism took off in England, with more militant feminists who were inspired by a workshop and a conference paper at the National Women's Liberation Conference of 1977. Revolutionary liberationists tended to be separatist, adhered to a doctrine of political lesbianism and directed their actions toward pornography, sexual abuse, and sexual violence. They argued that "male violence against women is an expression of male supremacy and political control of women" and conceptualized gender as class, in which all men held the power positions and all women were the exploited class. Increasingly, revolutionary feminists refused to engage with men, even those who engaged in similar social struggles. After 1977, more women's journals and documents were known to be or designated as items to be read by women only and by the 1978 nationwide conference fractures between liberationist and separatist feminists disrupted the conference and led to a collapse of the plenary session. The emotional response to the conference led to no one wanting to take on the responsibility of organizing further conferences.

Through the late 1980s, a liberationist group in Norwich was continuing direct action and protest on the issues of violence against women; however, most liberationists by the 1980s were transitioning away from direct action and recognizing that they had to find ways to engage with local, regional and national governments and agencies.

=== Northern Ireland ===
In Northern Ireland, the idea of Women's Liberation was often bound to the Nationalist Troubles of the era. Difficulties in advocating for women's rights when adherence to religious norms on morality and reproduction had become politicized, created a climate where advocates often had to shift focus to maintain an apolitical stance. During the period of Direct Rule, it was difficult for women to unite in a single struggle against patriarchy as the entire society was divided between whether there should be a United Ireland or a United Kingdom. Further, as men were interned, women were increasingly involved in developing coping mechanisms to care for their families and the violence surrounding them.

The Northern Ireland Women's Rights Movement (NIWRM), formed in 1975, tried to achieve neutrality by focusing on employment rights and sexism. As an umbrella organization with a formal charter and a mission aimed toward reforming legislation, by bringing Britain's sex discrimination laws to Northern Ireland, it was not a liberationist organization. However, the Women's Aid Federation, which was developed by a group of women who broke away from NIWRM, in 1977, was based on a non-hierarchical structure and formed from the Liberation Movement. Groups were autonomous and were open to all women, regardless of their political affiliation. The organizational goals were to provide refuges from family violence for women and children and they established groups in Belfast, Coleraine and Derry, spreading to Newry, North Down and Omagh in the 1980s.

Three London-based collectives working with women in Northern Ireland were the Women on Ireland Collective, Women and Ireland Group and the London-Armagh Coordinating Group. Each of these groups were autonomous organizations without a hierarchical organizational structure and affiliated with British WLM organizations, though they did not focus directly on patriarchal inequalities. The Women on Ireland Collective formed in 1974 and existed for one year. Members were all from Northern Ireland, members of the English WLM, and their work focused on improving awareness in Britain about Northern Irish women in working-class neighborhoods. Members worked to publicise the issues in Northern Ireland through conferences and public meetings, as well as through public demonstrations protesting prisoners' rights. After calling a hunger strike for two sisters, Marian and Dolours Price, and equating the government response of their force-feeding to suffragettes who had faced similar measures, the group drew harsh criticism from other members of the WLM. The Price sisters were seen as combatants because of their involvement with bombings and the controversy led to the dissolution of the collective in 1975.

The Women and Ireland Group was formed in 1976 from some of the members of the Women on Ireland Collective. They participated in the rally held for the Peace People in Trafalgar Square in November 1976, but as opposition to the peace activists because of their support for the Provisional Irish Republican Army, as opposed to being neutral. The group, like its predecessor focused on support for working-class women in Northern Ireland and raising awareness among British WLM members. Branches formed in Bristol, Brighton, Dundee and Manchester and increasingly worked with women political prisoners, before dissolving in 1980. London-Armagh Coordinating Group, typically known as the Armagh Group, formed in 1980 and was active through 1987. Their activities focused on women political prisoners and prisoner rights.

=== Scotland ===
As in other countries within the UK, the WLM emerged in Scotland in 1970. Student protests and the challenges to authority that emerged in the 1960s, were key to the development of Scottish activists. Specifically the challenge to Malcolm Muggeridge, rector at Edinburgh University, by over his opinion regarding distributing the pill at the Student Union. In what came to be known as the Muggeridge Affair, Anna Coote, at the time editor of the campus newspaper The Student and later a prominent liberationist, wrote a series of articles calling for him to resign. Coote's position was that as rector, Muggeridge should have put his personal convictions aside to support the student pro-distribution position, as he was their elected representative. In the wake of the criticism, Muggeridge resigned.

Consciousness-raising groups quickly formed and spread throughout Scotland, and though they were locally based had ties to regional and national networks of other groups. By 1970, groups had been established in Aberdeen, Edinburgh, Glasgow and St Andrews, and among other places were founded in Dundee and Shetland in 1972. Groups continued to be formed throughout the 1970s, with establishments created in North Lanarkshire with members from Cumbernauld and Kilsyth assembling in 1978 and the Falkirk Area Women's Group forming in the Central Lowlands in 1979. The first Women's Liberation conference in Scotland was held in Glasgow in 1972 and thereafter occurred annually until 1976, when it became a twice yearly event. Conference locations shifted annually to allow women from all geographical locations to be able to participate in the events and activists donated to funds to pool monies for travel.

Women's health became a focus of the WLM group from Glasgow, whereas lack of adequate childcare facilities became an important issue for groups in Aberdeen, Dundee, and Edinburgh. Other issues, such as women's objectification were addressed in direct actions, like when Edinburgh liberationists entered "Miss Conception", "Miss Fortune", "Miss Placed", "Miss Treated, and "Miss Used" in a mock beauty pageant staged in 1975. Similar action was taken by liberationists from Aberdeen who had been omitted from the "women's fayre" hosted at the Music Hall in celebration of International Women's Year. Activists in Dundee protested the male-only policy of the Tay Bridge Bar and sent complaints to the licensing board about the discrimination of being forced to retire to the lounge. Similar protests were held in Aberdeen, with the goal being to generate media coverage. In Shetland liberationists demonstrating against the opening of a strip club in Lerwick found themselves surrounded by religious groups who supported them, though not over their issue of women's objectification.

Scottish liberationists who focused on the issue of abortion were aware that many of the challenges to the existing law came from Scottish politicians. Because of this, they focused more on abortion than the broader issues of reproduction and contraception. The lack of facilities in Scotland which performed abortions became an issue for liberationists, as for example, women from Shetland had no access and were forced to travel to Aberdeen for services. They campaigned for Area Health Boards to provide facilities in each geographical area. Members of various WLM groups published articles on how their MPs voted on the issue; distributed guides, like the Abortion Law Reform Association's booklet, A Woman's Right to Choose: Action Guide; and performed street theatre to highlight the perils of backstreet abortions. Fierce debate in the period, occurred at rallies hosted by anti-abortion and pro-abortion forces, polarizing society.

Women's studies courses began in Aberdeen and Edinburgh in 1974 as part of an adult education initiative. Courses in Glasgow began in 1978 as part of an initiative sponsored by the Workers' Educational Association and the Extra-Mural Department of the University of Glasgow. Chris Aldred, a liberationist from Aberdeen and Margaret Marshall, head of the North of Scotland District WEA designed a ten-week programme to introduce women's education to Scottish working-class women. From 1975, Scottish women, who had up to that point relied on English publications for information about the movement, began their own initiatives. The Tayside Women's Liberation Newsletter began in 1975 and was published by WLM groups from Dundee and St Andrews. The Scottish Women's Liberation Journal began publication in 1977, changing its name to MsPrint the following year originated in Dundee and was printed by Aberdeen People's Press. Nessie, published in St Andrews, was begun in 1979.

Disagreements over ideological issues with socialist feminists were prevalent from the beginning of the movement. Marxist or Maoist feminists believed that the focus should be on class struggle, with recognition that certain systems were biased towards male supremacy. Liberationists argued that socialist feminism failed to recognize the differences in class struggle and women's issues, which were often sidelined by focus on class. Socialist feminists also felt the focus on men as the enemy and the idea of women needing to separate themselves from men, led to misunderstandings and characterizations of feminists as man-haters and lesbians, regardless of their actual sexual orientation. To many, in the period where sexuality had been a taboo topic, lesbians were seen as more "scary than scared". Though the movement was fluid and aimed to incorporate all women, these types of differences often led to group fractures and by the late 1970s, separate conferences were held for socialist feminists and liberationists.

From the mid-1970s liberationists in Scotland focused on violence against women and reached out to other autonomous women's groups to better understand as well as combat the problem. In 1972, activists in Edinburgh established a women's shelter to accommodate women and children. WLM members in Glasgow opened Interval House in 1974 and that same year the groups in Aberdeen and Dundee also opened shelters. Falkirk began planning a refuge in 1975 and opened a facility in 1976. Scottish liberationists, who had shunned participation in formal politics because of their patriarchal and reformist tendencies, began to develop campaigns and organizational structures which engaged with the state in the late 1970s. The Scottish Women's Aid formed in 1976 from liberationist groups, but recognizing the need to attain funding for the organization, they created a formal structure. By 1977, there were fifteen women's shelters scattered across the country, in places like Clackmannan, Kirkcaldy, Perth and Stirling.

The first rape crisis centre in Scotland was established in 1976 and by 1979 a network linking the centers across the country was established. As Scottish women were not covered by the Sexual Offences (Amendment) Act of 1976, survivors of rape had to either have medical evidence or a witness to the violation to file charges. In addition, marital rape was not a crime. To raise awareness on the issue, WLM members wrote articles in journals and sent letters to their MPs. Beginning in 1976, liberationists participated in direct protests, such as Witching the Meadows, where Edinburg's WLM members dressed as witches and hexed a particularly dangerous section of The Meadows Park. From 1977, they staged marches known as Reclaim the Night in Aberdeen, Dundee and Glasgow to gain publicity of the dangers to women of walking after dark. The last two WLM conferences in Scotland occurred in 1987 in Glasgow and 1989 in Edinburgh.

=== Wales ===
The Women's liberation movement in Wales was active in Cardiff and Swansea, but also had subgroups operating in Aberystwyth, Bangor, Carmarthen, Newport, and Pontypridd. The 1972 publication of The Descent of Woman by Welsh feminist and author, Elaine Morgan was influential for women involved in the movement. In 1974, the first Welsh National Women's Liberation Conference took place in Aberystyth. In 1978, the Welsh Women's Aid federation was established, which was led by Jane Hutt from its founding to 1988. Because of the WLM, the attitude of men towards women in pubs in Wales changed, becoming less taboo.

The Greenham Common Peace Camp started in 1981. A group of women protesting nuclear missiles marched from Cardiff to the RAF Greenham. Women left their jobs and families in order to occupy the space and fight for peace in a direct action which recognized that men were responsible for most of the world's violence. Unaligned with political groups, the women gained wide support from the media and public for their stance to non-violence. Helen John was one of the founders of the occupation.

== See also ==
- Feminism in the United Kingdom

== Bibliography ==
- Agyepong, Heather (10 March 2016). "The Forgotten Story of the Women Behind the British Black Panthers". The Debrief. London, England. Archived from the original on 28 May 2018.
- Aughey, Arthur; Morrow, Duncan (2014). Northern Ireland Politics. Abingdon-on-Thames, England: Routledge. ISBN 978-1-317-89083-6.
- Barber, Abi; Russell, Polly; Jolly, Margaretta; Cohen, Rachel; Johnson-Ross, Freya; Delap, Lucy (8 March 2013). "Activism and the Women's Liberation Movement". Sisterhood and After. London, England: British Library. Archived from the original on 27 September 2017.
- Barrington, Judith (May 2003). "Women's Lib Hits London". Gay & Lesbian Review Worldwide. 10 (3): 14–16 – via EBSCOhost.
- Begoña, Aretxaga (March 1995). "Ruffling a Few Patriarchal Hairs: Women's Experiences of War in Northern Ireland". Cultural Survival Quarterly. Cambridge, Massachusetts: Cultural Survival. Archived from the original on 24 April 2018.
- Bindel, Julie (2006-11-22). "Marching to Freedom". The Guardian. London, England. Archived from the original on 31 May 2017.
- Bindel, Julie (2011-11-03). "Miss World is back. How much has changed?". The Guardian. London, England. Archived from the original on 29 July 2016.
- "The Black Women's Movement" (PDF). London, England: Black Cultural Archives. 2013. Archived from the original (PDF) on 28 May 2018.
- Breitenbach, Esther; Mackay, Finona (2010). "Feminist politics in Scotland from the 1970s to 2000s: engaging with the changing state". In Breitenbach, Esther; Thane, Pat (eds.). Women and Citizenship in Britain and Ireland in the 20th Century: What Difference Did the Vote Make?. London, England: Bloomsbury Publishing. ISBN 978-1-4411-4900-8.
- Brixton Black Women's Group (Autumn 1984). "Black women organising". Feminist Review (17): 84–89. doi:10.2307/1395018. ISSN 0141-7789. JSTOR 1395018.
- Browne, Sarah (21 February 2017). The Women's Liberation Movement in Scotland. Oxford, England: Oxford University Press. ISBN 978-1-5261-1665-9 – via Project MUSE.
- Bruley, Sue (March 2016). "Women's Liberation at the Grass Roots: a view from some English towns, c.1968 –1990". Women's History Review. 25 (5): 723–740. doi:10.1080/09612025.2015.1132874. ISSN 0961-2025. S2CID 147563428.
- Campbell, Beatrix (2010-11-19). "Another World". The Guardian. London, England. Archived from the original on 19 January 2016.
- Carradice, Phil (2011). Snapshots of Welsh History: Without the Boring Bits. Bedlinog, Wales: Accent Press. ISBN 9781682991077.
- Cochrane, Kira (25 February 2010). "Forty years of women's liberation". The Guardian. London, England. Archived from the original on 2 February 2018.
- Cohen, Rachel (19 May 2011). "Pragna Patel discusses Southall Black Sisters". British Library. London, England. Archived from the original on 30 May 2018.
- Connolly, Linda Mary (September 1997). From Revolution to Devolution: A Social Movements Analysis of the Contemporary Women's Movement in Ireland (PDF) (PhD). Maynooth, County Kildare, Ireland: National University of Ireland Maynooth. Archived from the original (PDF) on 28 April 2018.
- Davenport, Hugo (27 June 1982). "CND Backs Growing Call for 1960s-type Direct Action". The Observer. London, England – via Newspapers.com.
- Dawson, Graham; Dover, Jo; Hopkins, Stephen (2017). The Northern Ireland Troubles in Britain: Impacts, Engagements, Legacies and Memories. Oxford, England: Oxford University Press. ISBN 978-0-7190-9631-0.
- Guest, Katy (14 March 2010). "Women who changed the world: 'There's always room for one more woman...'". The Independent. London, England. Archived from the original on 25 March 2017.
- Hannam, June (2008). "Women's History, Feminist History". Making History. London, England: Institute of Historical Research. Archived from the original on 28 March 2018.
- Hill, J. R. (2010). A New History of Ireland Volume VII: Ireland, 1921-84. Oxford, England: Oxford University Press. ISBN 978-0-19-959282-1.
- Hill, Myrtle; McAuley, Caroline; McLaughlin, Eithne; Porter, Fran (March 2006). Eighty Years of Talking About Equality in Northern Ireland: A History of Equality Discourses and Practices (PDF) (Report). Belfast, Northern Ireland: Equality and Social Inclusion in Ireland Project. Working Paper No 5. Archived from the original (PDF) on 6 July 2017.
- Hoggart, Lesley (2000). "Socialist Feminism, Reproductive Rights and Political Action". Capital & Class. 23 (70): 95–125. doi:10.1177/030981680007000105. ISSN 0309-8168. S2CID 144320604.
- Hughes, Celia (2015). Young Lives on the Left: Sixties Activism and the Liberation of the Self. Oxford, England: Oxford University Press. ISBN 9780719091940.
- Jolly, Margaretta (2014). "The Feelings Behind the Slogans: Abortion Campaigning and Feminist Mood-Work Circa 1979". New Formations. 82 (82): 100–113. doi:10.3898/NEWF.82.06.2014. S2CID 144016683.
- Mackie, Lindsay (10 October 1981). "GLC Accused of Aiding Pornography". The Guardian. London, England – via Newspapers.com.
- McMillan, Lesley (2007). Feminists Organising Against Gendered Violence. Houndsmills, Hampshire, England: Palgrave Macmillan. ISBN 978-0-230-59224-7.
- Noha, Bisila (2016-11-19). "Where did all the black women in history go?". Lon-art. London, England: Lon-Art CIC. Archived from the original on 29 June 2017.
- Peck, Tom (2011-11-07). "Anti-Miss World protesters back after 41 years". The Independent. London, England. Archived from the original on 27 May 2018.
- Potts, Malcolm; Diggory, Peter; Peel, John (1977). Abortion. Cambridge, England: Cambridge University Press. pp. 326. ISBN 9780521291507.
- "History of Rape Crisis". Rape Crisis England & Wales. Leeds, England. 2015. Archived from the original on 26 January 2018.
- Rees, Jeska (July 2010b). "A Look Back at Anger: the Women's Liberation Movement in 1978". Women's History Review. 19 (3): 337–356. doi:10.1080/09612025.2010.489343. ISSN 0961-2025. S2CID 144415673.
- Rees, Jeska (Spring 2010a). "'Are you a Lesbian?' Challenges in Recording and Analysing the Women's Liberation Movement in England". History Workshop Journal. 69 (69): 177–187. doi:10.1093/hwj/dbp033. ISSN 1363-3554. JSTOR 40646100. PMID 20514741. S2CID 10497082.
- Renzetti, Claire M.; Edleson, Jeffrey L. (2008). "Chiswick Women's Aid". Encyclopedia of Interpersonal Violence. Thousand Oaks, California: SAGE Publications. pp. 126–127. ISBN 9781412918008.
- Robinson, Jo (11 November 2011). "Miss World Contest". British Library. London, England. Archived from the original on 4 June 2016.
- Rolph, Avril (27 April 2002). "Not just the miners' strike—the Women's Liberation Movement in South Wales". The feminist seventies. York, England: University of York. Archived from the original on 21 November 2008.
- Rynder, Constance B. (Spring 2002). "The Origins and Early Years of the Northern Ireland Women's Coalition". New Hibernia Review. 6 (1): 44–58. ISSN 1092-3977 – via Project MUSE.
- Stoller, Sarah (2018). "Forging a Politics of Care: Theorizing Household Work in the British Women's Liberation Movement". History Workshop Journal. 85: 95–119. doi:10.1093/hwj/dbx063. S2CID 158596776 – via Project MUSE.
- Southwood, Julie (12 March 1982). "Out in the Cold for Peace". The Age. Melbourne, Victoria, Australia – via Newspapers.com.
- Wilde, William H.; Hooton, Joy; Andrews, Barry (1994). The Oxford companion to Australian literature (2nd ed.). Melbourne, Australia: Oxford University Press. ISBN 978-0-19-553381-1. "... the book became almost a sacred text for the international women's liberation movement of the 1970s, notwithstanding sporadic criticism of aspects of its ideology from some feminists."
- "UK: Wales: AMs—Jane Hutt". London, England: BBC. 1 September 1999. Archived from the original on 5 March 2016.
- "Second Wave of Feminism". Cardiff Women's Aid. Cardiff, Wales. 2016. Archived from the original on 26 May 2018.
- "Timeline of the Women's Liberation Movement". The British Library. London, England. 2015. Archived from the original on 23 April 2018.
- "We Never Walk Alone". The Guardian. 2 March 1979 – via Newspapers.com.
- "Austrian Beauty Wins New Miss World Crown". The Lawton Constitution. Lawton, Oklahoma. 28 November 1969 – via Newspapers.com.
- "National Abortion Campaign – NAC". Women's International Network News. 17 (4): 25. September 1991 – via EBSCOhost.
- "About Us". Women's Therapy Centre. London, England. 2013. Archived from the original on 30 September 2017.
