= Zainab Abbas (activist) =

Black British activist (born 1950)

- Born: 1950 (age 75–76); Middlesbrough, England
- Occupation: Activist
- Known for: Founding member of Brixton Black Women's Group

Zainab Abbas (born 1950) is a Black British activist working for women’s rights and social change, who has been a notable participant since the late 1960s and '70s in various key organisations of the UK black power movement, such as the Black Liberation Front, the British Black Panthers, and the Brixton Black Women's Group,

== Biography ==
Abbas was born in 1950, in Middlesbrough, in the north of England, to an Egyptian family of Nubian descent. Her mother had worked as a nurse in Palestine before leaving for reasons of safety because of the unrest there; as Abbas shared in an interview:

"Mother’s background was that she was raised in an orphanage in Egypt, and the good thing about being raised in an orphanage, probably the only good thing, was she got an education. So she was able to go to university and qualify as a nurse....

"She was brought to the UK by a major in the British army and his family....They were nice and just wanted to get her into Britain. She went down to London and there she met my dad. Then I know she worked in the health service as a nurse....

"I lost my father when I was very young. My mother raised five of the six of us, because my sister died, as a single parent. She was very inventive, I’ve had a great deal of respect all my life for my mother."

Abbas has spoken of the effect the US Black Power movement had on her as a teenager; she was particularly impressed by hearing Stokely Carmichael speak in July 1967 at the Roundhouse in London, where she had hitchhiked to attend her first ever political meeting. She also recalls the impact of hearing James Brown's 1968 song "Say It Loud – I'm Black and I'm Proud", as well as being inspired by Malcolm X.

In 1971, she moved down to Birmingham, in the West Midlands, where she joined the Birmingham Black Panthers and taught in the black supplementary school system. Then, in 1971, she went to London, joining the Black Liberation Front (BLF). The organisation was affiliated with the International Panther network, and as the BLF's international secretary, Abbas liaised with the US Panthers, developing a lasting friendship with Kathleen Cleaver.

In 1973, Abbas joined with Gerlin Bean (whom she saw as a mentor), Beverley Bryan, Olive Morris, Liz Obi and other activists to found the Brixton Black Women's Group (BBWG), an influential and foundational Black feminist grouping.

Abbas, together with Bean and Ansel Wong, was in the British delegation to the Sixth Pan-African Congress, which was hosted in Dar es Salaam, Tanzania, in 1974. The UK delegates' address to the Congress reiterated the commitment of Black Britons to the liberation of Africans, people of African descent, and others throughout the world, from colonial policies, imperialism, and racism.

In 1980, Abbas started the first Black-owned public relations company in the UK and she has worked extensively on public affairs in Africa and the Middle East.

Abbas is among those interviewed in the 2021 film Black Power: A British Story of Resistance, directed by George Amponsah. On 13 July 2024, she was a leading participant in the inaugural Black Lives Matter UK Festival of Collective Liberation held at Friends House in London, attended by more than 600 activists and supporters.
