= Speak Out (newsletter) =

Second-wave feminist newsletter

- Categories: Women's liberation, Black feminism
- Founded: 1977
- Company: Brixton Black Women's Group
- Country: United Kingdom
- Based in: London

Speak Out was a second-wave feminist newsletter, launched in 1977 by the Brixton Black Women's Group (BBWG). The aim of the newsletter was to keep alive the debate about the relevance of feminism to black politics and provided a black women's perspective on immigration, housing, health and culture.

The editorial of the first issue describes one of its objectives to "we free our minds to free our bonds and our sisters bonds!" The fifth and final issue was published in 1983.

The publication "frequently used a 'Marxist framework' to criticise the racism of the State". Contributions to Speak Out marking International Women's Day in 1982 connected local Black feminist activism to international efforts towards furthering women's rights around the world. Group member Melba Wilson explained how the magazine was a way of furthering BBWG's aims to support other causes, including "independence for Palestine. Groups fighting for South African independence […] We worked with Irish groups who were fighting for Irish independence and those kinds of initiatives."

Speak Out was one of several feminist small press publications in the 1970s-1980s which supported communities of Black and Asian women, which included addressing issues facing mothers, workers, lesbians and queer women, including FOWAAD (published by OWAAD), We Are Here, and Mukti.

== Notable contributors ==
Beverley Bryan, Stella Dadzie, Liz Fajemisin, Sindamani Bridglal, Takumba Ria Lawal, Monica Morris, Suzanne Scafe, Jocelyn Wolfe, Amina Mama, Sylvia Erike, Gerlin Bean, Olive Morris, Lindiwe Tsele, Olive Gallimore, Judith Lockhart, Joan Morris, Dorothea Smartt, Claudette Williams, and Melba Wilson.

== Legacy ==
Speak Out!: The Brixton Black Women's Group, a collection of the writings of BBWG, was published in 2023, edited by Milo Miller with an introduction and interview by Jade Bentil.

Issues of Speak Out are held by collections including the Bishopsgate Institute, and Feminist Library.
