= Martin Luther King Memorial Prize =

Annual literary prize

The Martin Luther King Memorial Prize was instituted by novelist John Brunner and his wife and was awarded annually to a literary work published in the United States or Britain that was deemed to improve interracial understanding, 'reflecting the ideals to which Dr Martin Luther King dedicated his life'. As of 1984, the author of the winning work was awarded £100 (equivalent to £330 in 2025). Brunner died in 1995, and it is uncertain if the award has continued.

== Recipients ==
Winners of the prize have included:

- Because They're Black (1972) by Derek Humphry and Gus John
- Black and White: The Negro and English Society, 1555–1945 (1973) by James Walvin
- The Fight Against Slavery (1975) by Evan Jones
- A Dry White Season (1980) by André Brink
- In a Dark Time (1984) edited by Nicholas Humphrey and Robert Lifton
- The Heart of the Race: Black Women's Lives in Britain (1985) by Beverley Bryan, Stella Dadzie and Suzanne Scafe
- The European Tribe (1987) by Caryl Phillips
- Behind the Frontlines: Journey into Afro-Britain (1988) by Ferdinand Dennis.
- Parting the Waters: America in the King Years, 1954–63 (1988) by Taylor Branch
