= BBWC =

BBWC may refer to:

- Battery-backed write cache, a technique for accelerating disk writes
- Beveled-base wadcutter, a type of bullets
- Brixton Black Women's Centre
