= Sheba Feminist Press =

UK women's movement publishing co-operative

- Founded: 1980
- Defunct: 1994
- Country of origin: United Kingdom
- Headquarters location: London
- Publication types: Books

Sheba Feminist Press was a UK publishing co-operative formed in 1980 by a group of seven women involved in the women's liberation movement. Sheba was among a few small independent publishers to emerge out of the UK women's movement during the 1970s and early 1980s. Unlike other companies of the era such as Virago and The Women's Press, Sheba was a workers' collective, operating as a political project that published activist works from the struggles of the women's movement, with a focus on publishing new writers and "ordinary, non-privileged women", and an emphasis on race and class.

Sheba has been described in The Financial Times as "one of the UK's most innovative and radical feminist publishers" and "unquestionably groundbreaking — it was the first to publish Audre Lorde in the UK, printed books about lesbian sexuality and erotica and provided a space for authors of colour such as Jackie Kay, Gail Lewis and Pratibha Parmar."

Other writers published by Sheba included bell hooks, June Jordan, Jewelle Gomez, Joan Nestle, and Sarah Schulman, and among titles produced by the co-operative were the anthologies Through the Break: Women and Personal Struggle, Charting the Journey: Writings by Black and Third World Women, Girls are Powerful: Young Women's Writing from Spare Rib, Positively Women: Living with AIDS, and two volumes of Serious Pleasure: Lesbian Erotic Stories. Another notable anthology, compiled by Sue O'Sullivan, was the 1987 feminist cookery book Turning the Tables: Recipes and Reflections from Women, contributors to which included Angela Carter, Julie Christie, Linda Bellos, Michelene Wandor, Val Wilmer, Zoe Fairbairns, Miriam Margolyes, and Catherine Hall, among others.

Sheba ceased trading in 1994. Records of Sheba Feminist Press are held at the London School of Economics.
