= Gail Lewis =

Gail Lewis may refer to:

- Gail Robinson (Neighbours), also Lewis, a fictional character from the Australian soap opera Neighbours
- Gail Lewis (academic) (born 1951), British writer, psychotherapist, researcher, and activist
