= Clover Graham =

Jamaican human rights lawyer (1956–2012)

- Born: 1956; Portland Parish, Colony of Jamaica, British Empire
- Died: 2012 (aged 56)
- Education: Kingston University; London School of Economics
- Occupation: Lawyer

Clover Graham (1956–2012) was a Jamaican lawyer, university lecturer, and honorary liaison to the UNHCR in Jamaica (1998–2012), specialising in human rights.

== Early life and education ==
Graham was born in Portland, Jamaica. She studied at Kingston University and the London School of Economics.

== Career ==
Graham worked at Brixton Community Law Centre, specialising in racial discrimination cases, and defending people prosecuted during the 1981 Brixton riot. She also worked at the Norman Manley Law School legal aid clinic, and lectured at the University of Technology, both in Jamaica. She also specialised in defending immigrants and asylum seekers.

== Activism ==
She campaigned for the curriculum at Norwood Girls' School, South London, to reflect Black history and achievements.

She was a member of the Brixton Black Women's Group, facilitating the Mary Seacole craft group which supported working class mothers to gain skills and financial independence. She was a volunteer at Sabarr Books, Brixton, the first volunteer-run Black bookshop in London.

== Personal life ==
Graham was diagnosed with cancer in 2001. In 2007, her son, Taiwo, and his girlfriend, Jhanel Whyte, were murdered in St Andrew, Jamaica.

Graham was murdered in August 2012, at the age of 56. Human Rights Watch, UNHRC, and The Inter-American Commission on Human Rights called for justice for the crime.
