= The European Tribe =

1987 essay collection by Caryl Phillips

- First UK edition
- Author: Caryl Phillips
- Language: English
- Genre: Essays
- Publisher: Faber and Faber
- Publication date: 1987
- Publication place: United Kingdom
- Media type: Print

The European Tribe is the first book of essays by Caryl Phillips, published in 1987 (in the UK by Faber and Faber and in the US by Farrar, Straus & Giroux). Characterised by Andrea Lee in The New York Times as "part travelogue, part cri de coeur", the collection chronicles the author's journey through multiracial Europe of the 1980s, "guided by a moral compass rather than a map" and "seeking personal definition within the parameters of growing up black in Europe". Maya Jaggi of The Guardian has called it "a coolly indignant dissection of the 'sickness in Europe's soul'".

According to a review in The Caribbean Writer, "The topics of race, nationality and culture have loomed large in the consciousness of 20th century individuals, and they continue to attract literary writers of diverse sensibilities. Rarely, however, has the black writer attempted to grapple with such impassioned issues among Europeans; it is an enticing subject, for which Mr. Phillips would appear to be exceptionally equipped." Charles R. Johnson in the Los Angeles Times wrote:

"Novelist Caryl Phillips' brief, eye-opening book, The European Tribe, is one black man's answer to Tocqueville's classic [Democracy in America], and may well become a classic of cultural exploration itself. ...Phillips' true theme in his travels everywhere is the global disenfranchisement of black people at a time when 'America has conquered Europe economically, politically, and culturally.' In 1831, Tocqueville wrote of Americans: 'The taste for superiority crops up everywhere.' A century and a half later, Phillips sees Europe in decline, America, 'the Frankenstein that Europe created risen from the slab,' and right-wing extremism becoming increasingly the solution to unemployment, hopelessness, and disillusionment in Western Europe.

The European Tribe, comprised partly of personal odyssey, partly of political indictment, is too important a book to be ignored."

The European Tribe was awarded the Martin Luther King Memorial Prize in 1987.
