= National Women's Liberation Conference =

The National Women's Liberation Conference (or National Women's Liberation Movement Conference) was a United Kingdom initiative organised to bring together activists in the Women's Liberation Movement with the aim of developing a shared political outlook. Ten conferences took place between 1970 and 1978. There was a Welsh conference in 1974 and a Scottish conference in 1977.

During these conferences, the seven demands of the UK Women's Liberation Movement were formulated. These demands were for equal pay, equal educational and job opportunities, free contraception and abortion on demand, free 24-hour nurseries, legal and financial independence for all women, the right to a self defined sexuality and an end to discrimination against lesbians, and freedom for all women from intimidation by the threat or use of violence or sexual coercion regardless of marital status and an end to the laws, assumptions and institutions which perpetuate male dominance and aggression to women.

== First Conference, Oxford, 1970 ==
The first National Women's Liberation Conference was held from 27 February to 1 March 1970, and attracted over 600 women. The first four demands were discussed. The conference was held at Ruskin College, Oxford. It was organised by a group of women who had been participating in the History Workshop seminars including Ruskin students Arielle Aberson and Sally Alexander, and historian Sheila Rowbotham. It was initially planned as an academic conference on women's history but it was decided that a meeting to address the contemporary lives of women was needed. Rowbotham gave the call for papers and historians Anna Davin, Catherine Hall, Juliet Mitchell and others gave papers and spoke.

Attendees included approximately 60 men and 40 children. Male attendees, which included Stuart Hall, ran the child care centre so the women could attend. Jamaican-born youth worker Gerlin Bean was one of the few Black women who attended. In an interview following the conference she said “the problems as women are the same; the problems as black women are different. Very different.” Bean went on to co-found the Brixton Black Women's Group, a key organisation in the UK's Black Women's Movement. The conference organisers had to expand the conference into the Oxford Union because of the high turnout of attendees. Rowbotham stated that the move to the Oxford Union was “poignant considering it was an environment that was meant to produce male orators who would become prime ministers”.

At the final session of the conference, called “Where Are We Going?” facilitated by Lois Graessle, attendees voted unanimously on four demands:

1. Equal pay
2. Equal educational and job opportunities
3. Free contraception and abortion on demand
4. Free 24-hour nurseries

British newspaper The Guardian called the conference the "biggest landmarks in British women's history". The conference and the creche were filmed by Sue Crockford, Tony Wickert and Ellen Adams and they joined this with film from the following International Women’s Day March to create the film, "A Woman's Place".

== Second Conference, Skegness, 1971 ==
This was held on 15–17 October 1971. The four demands from the First Conference were agreed.

== Third Conference, Manchester, 1972 ==
This was held on 25–26 March 1972.

== Fourth Conference, London, 1972 ==
This was held in November 1972.

== Fifth Conference, Bristol, 1973 ==
This was held on 25–26 March 1973.

== Sixth Conference, Edinburgh, 1974 ==
This was held in July 1974. The fifth and sixth demands were added.

== Welsh National Women's Liberation Conference, Aberystwyth 1974 ==
This was held in Aberystwyth in 1974.

== Seventh Conference, Manchester, 1975 ==
This was held on 25–26 March 1975.

== Eighth Conference, Newcastle, 1976 ==
This was held on 23–25 April 1976.

== Ninth Conference, London, 1977 ==
This was held in 1977.

== Tenth Conference, Birmingham, 1978 ==
The tenth conference was held from 7 to 13 April 1978 at Ladywood School in Birmingham. More than three thousand women attended. At the plenary session, the seventh demand was added, which combined two campaigns of the Women's Liberation Movement against rape and domestic violence. It read "We demand freedom from intimidation by threat or use of violence or sexual coercion, regardless of martial status, and an end all laws, assumptions and institutions which perpetuate male dominance and men's aggression towards women". The sixth demand was amended so that "the right to a self-defined sexuality" became the preface for the rest of the other demands. It was also agreed that all seven demands would be considered over the next year and any proposals for their amendment would be voted on at the 1978 conference.

There were a number of workshops on Saturday which encouraged small group discussion. On the Sunday, a number of specialist workshops were held on topics such as women in printing, women against fascism and racism, guilt and jealousy, the national abortion campaign, country women and Jewish women. There was live music, including Frankie Armstrong, street theatre on the theme of YBA Wife?, and a disco on the Saturday night. Twenty male volunteers ran the day care, supervising more than a hundred children.
