= Beatrice Halsaa =

Norwegian political scientist

Beatrice Halsaa (born 7 December 1947) is a Norwegian political scientist, gender studies expert and feminist. She was appointed as Professor of Gender Studies at the University of Oslo in 2003, the second person to hold a chair in that discipline at the University of Oslo. She was leader of the EU research project "Gendered Citizenship in Multicultural Europe: The Impact of Contemporary Women's Movements," which was a cooperation of 15 research institutions in ten countries. Her fields of expertise are gender equality, women's movements, feminist theory, and multiculturalism.

Halsaa holds a cand.polit. degree in political science from 1975. She worked at Lillehammer University College from 1977 to 2001, where she became Associate Professor in 1988. She was Professor II (part-time chair) at the Norwegian University of Science and Technology from 1999 to 2002. In 2001, she became Associate Professor at the University of Oslo, and full Professor in 2003. She was a member of the Executive Board of the Norwegian Association for Women's Rights from 2002 to 2010.

== Selected publications ==
- Christensen, Hilda Rømer, Beatrice Halsaa, Aino Saarinen (eds.):Crossing Borders. Re-Mapping Women's Movements at the Turn of the 21st Century. University Press of Southern Denmark, Odense, (2004), ISBN 8778388597
- Halsaa, Beatrice og Else Viestad: I pose og sekk. Framtidsbilder. Emilia, Oslo, (1990), ISBN 8274190068
- Halsaa, Beatrice: Ingen heksekunst! Håndbok for kommunale likestillingsutvalg. Kommuneforlaget, Oslo, (1989)
- Halsaa, Beatrice and Janneke van der Ros: Muligheter og motstand: Rett person på rett sted. ODH Skriftserie nr. 81. Oppland distriktshøgskole/Østlandsforskning, Lillehammer, (1989)
- Halsaa, Beatrice og Dag Seierstad: Norsk og internasjonal politikk. Cappelen, Oslo, (1988)
- Haavio-Mannila, Elina, Drude Dahlerup, Maud Landby Eduards, E. Gudmundsdottir, Beatrice Halsaa, Helga M. Hernes, E. Hänninen-Salmelin, B. Sigmundsdottir, S. Sinkkonen, and Torild Skard: Unfinished Democracy. Women in Nordic Politics. Pergamon Press, Oxford, (1985)
