= The Heart of the Race =

1985 socio-historical study book

- Author: Beverley Bryan, Stella Dadzie and Suzanne Scafe (with other members of the Brixton Black Women's Group)
- Language: English
- Genre: Sociology
- Publisher: Virago Press
- Publication date: 1985
- Publication place: United Kingdom
- Pages: 250 (first edition)
- ISBN: 9780860683612
- OCLC: 1050057930

The Heart of the Race: Black Women's Lives in Britain was a 1985 book by Beverley Bryan, Stella Dadzie and Suzanne Scafe. A socio-historical study, it looked at the realities of life for Black women in the United Kingdom after the Second World War. Although authorship was credited to Bryan, Dadzie and Scafe, the book was in fact written not only by those three named women but also by several others in the Brixton Black Women's Group (BWG), of which all the authors were members. The BWG originally planned for The Heart of the Race to be credited to the "Brixton Black Women's Group" as a whole. However, the book's publisher Virago Press refused to use a collective name and instead credited three members of the BWG, namely, Bryan, Dadzie and Scafe.

The Heart of the Race was dedicated to Olive Morris, a co-founder of the BWG, who died in 1979.

The book discusses the history of Afro-Caribbean immigration to the UK, specifically focusing on the experiences of Black British women. The BWG focused on the role played by Black British women in the postwar economy, including the development of the National Health Service (NHS), in addition to discussing the anti-racist work Black British women were involved in.

The book won the Martin Luther King Memorial Prize in 1985.

The Heart of the Race was later republished in 2018 by Verso Books.
