= Lambeth Women's Project =

Defunct women's organisation in Lambeth, London

Coordinates: 51.4667°N 0.1175°W

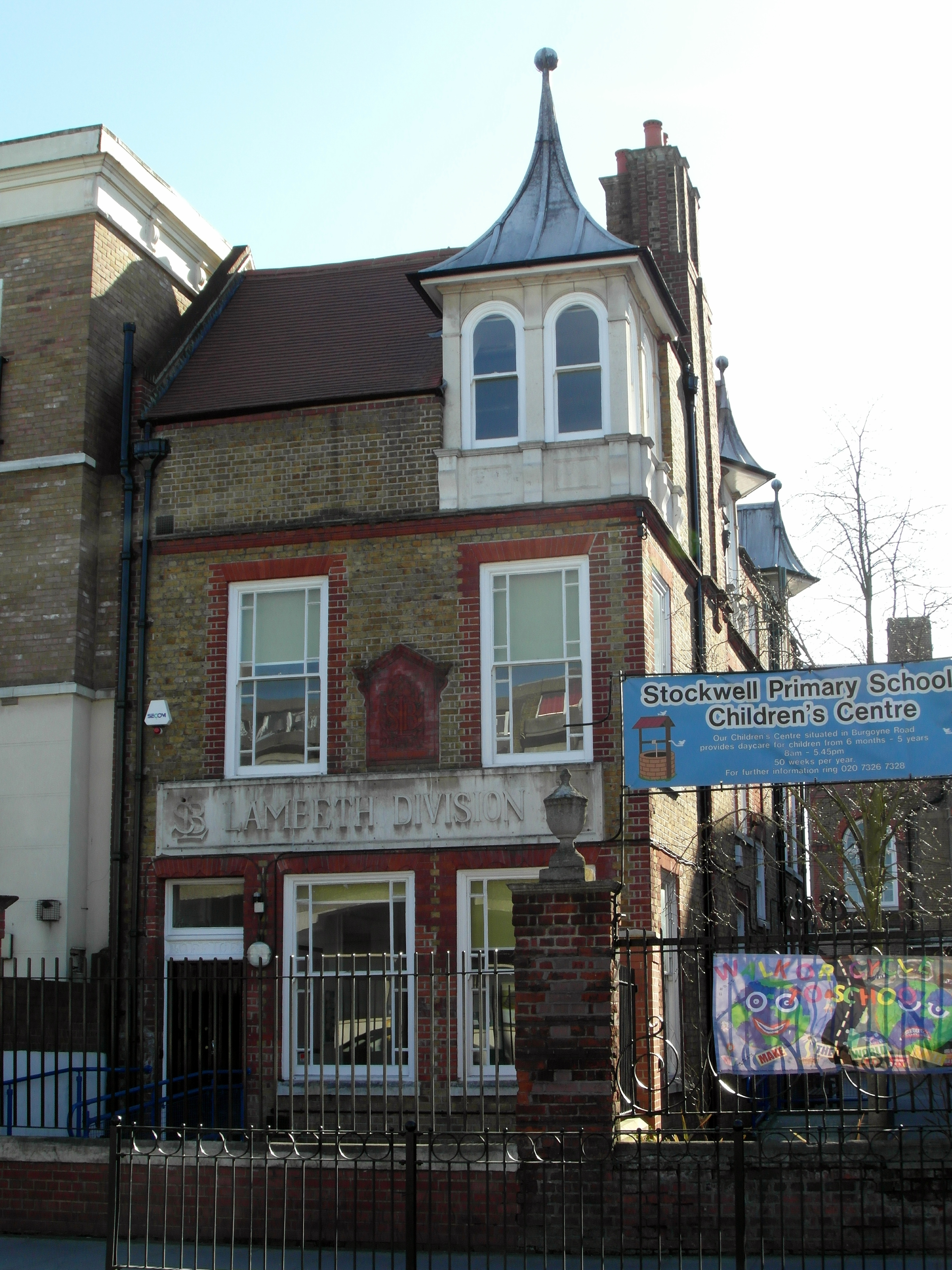
- The front of the building that had previously housed Lambeth Women's Project, shown in 2013
- Formation: 1979
- Dissolved: 2012
- Location: 166a Stockwell Road, Lambeth, London
- Formerly called: Lambeth Girl's Project

Lambeth Women's Project is a women's organisation located at 166a Stockwell Road in Stockwell, Lambeth, South London that provides counselling and a range of other services to women in the area.

== History ==
It was founded by a group of women youth workers in 1979 as Lambeth Girl's Project. The women's project provided a space for various community groups to meet, as well as services for women including counselling, sexual-health advice, meditation, mentoring, crafts, yoga, art, and music. Over 150 women used the space each month.

Some of the proceeds from Ladyfest London in 2002 were used to buy a drumkit for the space. In 2007 Ladies Rock Camp, organised by Nazmia Jamal and Liz Riches, was held in the project's building. Post-punk band The Raincoats gave a talk and performed there on the opening night.

It closed in 2012 after being evicted from their location by Stockwell Primary School and Children's Centre, who had been handed management of the building by Lambeth Council. 12 volunteers, including mothers, staged a sit-in at the building to protest the eviction. A pot banging protest was held during the occupation.

The history of the organisation is preserved at Lambeth Archives, catalogued by archivist and youth worker Ego Ahaiwe Sowinski who had been a member of the project. The LWP blog was also preserved as part of the UK Web Archive.

Writing in 2024, Nydia A. Swaby identifies Lambeth Women's Project as "deeply inspired" by Amy Ashwood Garvey who opened the first Black women's centre in London in 1954.
