= Amrit Wilson =

British-Indian writer and activist (born 1941)

- Born: 1941 (age 84–85); India
- Occupations: Writer, journalist and activist
- Notable work: Finding a Voice: Asian Women in Britain (1978)

Amrit Wilson (born 1941) is a British-Indian writer, journalist and activist who since the 1970s has focused on issues of race and gender in Britain and South Asian politics. Her 1978 book Finding a Voice: Asian Women in Britain won the Martin Luther King Award, and remains an influential feminist book. Her other book publications include Dreams, Questions, Struggles: South Asian Women in Britain (London: Pluto Press, 2006), and as a journalist she has been published in outlets including Ceasefire Magazine, Media Diversified, openDemocracy and The Guardian.

== Background ==
Wilson grew up in India and came to Britain as a student in 1961. She became a freelance journalist in 1974, and was active as an anti-racist militant in the 1970s. Wilson's book Finding a Voice: Asian Women in Britain, first published in 1978 and reprinted 40 years later, has been described as "[c]hallenging the views of South Asian women as weak, submissive, one-dimensional stereotypes" and as having "cleared the space for Asian women to speak for themselves". Wilson was a founder member of Awaz, the UK's first Asian feminist collective, and was active in OWAAD, the Organisation of Women of Asian and African Descent (1978–82). She was formerly chair of Imkaan, a national network of Black, Asian, Minority Ethnic and Refugee women's refuges and services for women facing violence, and is a founder member of South Asia Solidarity Group.

She also was Senior Lecturer in Women's Studies/South Asian Studies at Luton University, and has carried an Overseas Citizenship of India (OCI).

In April 2024, Wilson revealed that she had had her OCI card withdrawn by the Indian government and is unable to travel to India after having been accused of "anti-India activities" and "detrimental propaganda against India."

== Selected bibliography ==
- Finding a Voice: Asian Women in Britain (1978; second edition Daraja Press, 2019, ISBN 978-1988832012)
- The Challenge Road: Women and the Eritrean Revolution (The Red Sea Press, 1991, ISBN 978-0932415714)
- Dreams, Questions, Struggles: South Asian Women in Britain (London: Pluto Press, 2006; ISBN 9780745318479)
- The Threat of Liberation (Pluto Press, 2013; ISBN 9781849649407)
