= List of Queen's Counsel in England and Wales appointed in 1954 =

A Queen's Counsel (post-nominal QC), or King's Counsel (post-nominal KC) during the reign of a king, is an eminent lawyer (usually a barrister or advocate) who is appointed by the monarch to be one of "Her Majesty's Counsel learned in the law." The term is recognised as an honorific. Appointments are made from within the legal profession on the basis of merit rather than a particular level of experience. Members have the privilege of sitting within the bar of court. As members wear silk gowns of a particular design (see court dress), appointment as Queen's Counsel is known informally as taking silk, and hence QCs are often colloquially called silks.

The rank emerged in the sixteenth century, but came to prominence over the course of the nineteenth. Appointment was open to barristers only until 1995. The first women KCs had been appointed only in 1949.

== 1954 ==
Name	Inns of Court	University	Notes	Ref
Ronald Owen Lloyd Armstrong-Jones, MBE				
Sir John Rowlatt, KCIE, CB, MC				
Clive Stuart Saxon Burt	Gray's Inn (1925)	University College, Oxford	Burt was born in 1900 and graduated from Oxford in 1922 with a history degree. After being called to the bar, he practised on the Western Circuit, although this was interrupted by service in the Second World War; he was commissioned into the Scots Guards in 1940 and ended the war a Captain. He was appointed chairman of the Performing Rights Tribunal in 1957, but the following year became a Metropolitan Magistrate, serving until 1973. He died in 1981.	
Charles John Addison Doughty				
David Eifion Puleston Evans				
Maurice Legat Lyell				
Bernard Benjamin Gillis				
Myer Alan Barry King-Hamilton				
Percy Malcolm Wright, MBE				
Thomas George Talbot				
Dingle Mackintosh Foot				
Norman John Skelhorn				
John Anthony Plowman				
John Fitzgerald Marnan, MBE	Inner Temple (1931)	Trinity College, Oxford	Marnan was born in 1908, the son of an Irish barrister. He married three times, firstly to a daughter of the civil servant Sir Keith Price, and thirdly to a daughter of Major-General W. N. Herbert. He graduated from Oxford in 1931. His practice as a barrister was interrupted by service in the Second World War with the Irish Guards; he was appointed an MBE in 1944 and ended the war with the rank of Major. He was appointed a Metropolitan Magistrate in 1956, but two years later became a Crown Counsel in Kenya. In 1959, he was appointed a Justice of the Federal Supreme Court of the West Indies Federation. He returned to England in 1962 to be a commissioner in the Crown Court, moving to the Central Criminal Court two years later. He was appointed Deputy Chairman of the Greater London Quarter Sessions in 1966 and Chairman of the North East area of London Quarter Sessions two years later. His final judicial appointment was as a Circuit Judge; he sat between 1972 and 1980. He died in 1990.	
Richard Orme Wilberforce, OBE				
Alexander David Karmel				
David Lockhart-Mure Renton, TD				
John Thompson				
Ernest Martin Jukes				
Joseph Donaldson Cantley, OBE				
George Stanley Waller, OBE				
Leonard Caplan				
