= Feminist Review =

- Cover of the first issue
- Discipline: Women's studies
- Language: English

Publication details
- History: 1979–present
- Publisher: SAGE Publishing
- Frequency: Triannually
- Impact factor: 1.341 (2019)

Standard abbreviations
- ISO 4: Fem. Rev.

Indexing
- ISSN: 0141-7789 (print); 1466-4380 (web)
- LCCN: 80647745
- JSTOR: 01417789
- OCLC no.: 40348469

Links
- Journal homepage; Online access; Online archive

Feminist Review is a triannual peer-reviewed academic journal with a focus on exploring gender in its multiple forms and interrelationships. The journal was established in 1979. It is published by SAGE Publishing and is edited by a collective.

== Abstracting and indexing ==
- Applied Social Sciences Index and Abstracts
- British Humanities Index
- Current Contents/Social & Behavioural Sciences
- International Bibliography of Book Reviews of Scholarly Literature and Social Sciences
- International Bibliography of Periodical Literature
- International Bibliography of the Social Sciences
- International Political Science Abstracts
- Social Sciences Citation Index
- Scopus
- Sociological Abstracts
- Studies on Women and Gender Abstracts
- Worldwide Political Science Abstracts

According to the Journal Citation Reports, the journal has a 2018 impact factor of 0.932.

== See also ==
- Gender studies
- List of women's studies journals
- Feminist Studies
- Signs
- Frontiers: A Journal of Women Studies
