= Gail Lewis (academic) =

British writer, psychotherapist, researcher, and activist (born 1951)

- Born: 1951 (age 74–75); London, England
- Occupations: Psychotherapist, researcher

Academic background
- Education: London School of Economics; University of Sussex
- Alma mater: Open University

Academic work
- Discipline: Psychoanalysis
- Institutions: Birkbeck College; Open University; Lancaster University
- Main interests: black feminism; subjectivity; intersectionality

Gail Lewis (born 1951) is a British writer, psychotherapist, researcher, and activist. She is visiting senior fellow in the Department of Gender Studies at the London School of Economics, and Reader Emerita of Psychosocial Studies at Birkbeck College, London. She trained as a psychodynamic psychotherapist at the Tavistock Clinic.

Lewis's work is rooted in black feminist and anti-racist struggle, and a socialist, anti-imperialist politics. She was a co-founder of the Organisation for Women of African and Asian Descent (OWAAD), and she was a member of the Brixton Black Women's Group. She was a founding collective editorial member of the Feminist Review. Lewis was interviewed for the oral history project "Sisterhood and After: The Women's Liberation", archived at the British Library, a project that interviewed "feminists who were at the forefront of the Women's Liberation Movement in the 1970s and 80s".

== Biography and education ==
Lewis was born and raised in London; her mother was white and her father was from British Guiana. Her 2009 article "Birthing Racial Difference: conversations with my mother and others" uses autobiographical references and reflections on psychoanalysis and sociology to "explore how 'race' has operated as structuring principle in Britain since the end of the Second World War", and "mixed-race, mother-child relations".

Lewis studied Social Anthropology at the London School of Economics (LSE), followed by an MPhil in Development Studies at the University of Sussex. She passed her PhD in Social Policy with the Open University, and taught in the Open University Social Sciences Faculty between 1995 and 2004 and 2007 to 2013.

Lewis is an Arsenal football club fan.

== Career ==
Lewis was Reader in Psychosocial Studies in the Department of Psychosocial Studies at Birkbeck College until 2019, having joined the department in 2013 and served as Assistant Dean between 2015 and 2017. She was Head of Department of the Institute of Women's Studies at Lancaster University.

She has been a visiting Scholar at Clark University, Massachusetts, USA.

Lewis frequently contributes to feminist discussions and events: she interviewed Hortense Spillers for the ICA in 2018.

Lewis has held many roles within academic publishing, including:

- Co-Editor: European Journal of Women's Studies (2008–2017)
- Editorial Board: Social Politics (2007–2010)
- Editorial Board: Free Associations (2012–2018)
- Advisory Board: Studies in the Maternal (2010–2017)
- Co-Editor: Feminist Theory (2005–2007)
- Editorial Collective: Feminist Review (1990–1999)

== Activism and contributions to policy and politics ==
In 1998, Lewis assisted the legal team (led by solicitors Dieghton and Guedalla) representing Duwayne Brooks (friend of Stephen Lawrence) in the MacPherson Inquiry into the Murder of Stephen Lawrence. With Professor S. Hall and Dr. E. McLaughlin, Lewis co-authored a submission on racial stereotyping.

Lewis gave evidence in 2000 to the "Commission on the Future of Multi-Ethnic Britain", published as The Parekh Report. Lewis identified the importance of gender to the future of multi-ethnic Britain and the role of social policy in social inclusion.

Writing for the Guardian for a 2014 International Women's Day piece (which included feminist activists Robin Morgan, Charlotte Raven, Amrit Wilson, Selma James, and Nawal El Saadawi), Lewis reflected on "intersectionality" and "infighting" in feminism, writing: "The current debates about intersectionality recall, if not repeat, many of the battles fought between black and Asian feminists (along with their white anti-racist compañeras) and white feminists who felt the struggle was being diverted by the call to pay attention to the inseparability of misogyny, racism, homophobia and class. While there remains much to do to expand an intersectional understanding of the conditions that determine what it means to be a woman and who may be included, without those earlier moments of infighting, feminism today would be all the poorer."

== Honours ==
- In 2019, Lewis was invited to give the Feminist Review Annual Lecture. Lewis's lecture was entitled "Lies and Disguises: The Racialisation of "Culture" and Child Sexual Exploitation".
- In 2019, Lewis was awarded an honorary doctorate from the Tavistock Clinic/Essex University.
- Lewis was recognised as one of the "feminists who were at the forefront of the Women's Liberation Movement in the 1970s and 80s", and interviewed for the oral history project 'Sisterhood and After: The Women's Liberation', archived at the British Library. Other women interviewed for the project include Anna Davin, Zoe Fairbairns, and Barbara Taylor.

== Selected publications ==
=== Books ===
- Editor and co-author of Citizenship: personal lives and social policy (Bristol: The Policy Press in Association with the Open University, 2004).
- Race, Gender, Social Welfare: Encounters in a postcolonial society (Cambridge: Polity Press, 2000).

== See also ==
- Birkbeck College
- Organisation for Women of African and Asian Descent (OWAAD)
