= Stella Dadzie =

British activist and writer (born 1952)

- Born: 1952 (age 73–74); London, United Kingdom
- Occupations: Educationalist, activist, writer and historian
- Notable work: The Heart of the Race: Black Women's Lives in Britain (1985); A Kick in the Belly: Women, Slavery & Resistance (2020); A Whole Heap of Mix Up (2025)

Stella Dadzie (born in 1952) is a British educationalist, activist, writer and historian. She is best known for her involvement in the UK's Black Women's Movement, being a founding member of the Organisation of Women of African and Asian Descent (OWAAD) in the 1970s, and co-authoring with Suzanne Scafe and Beverley Bryan in 1985 the book The Heart of the Race: Black Women's Lives in Britain.

In 2020, Verso published a new book by Dadzie, A Kick in the Belly: Women, Slavery & Resistance. In October 2025, a collection of Dadzie's personal, political and creative writings, entitled A Whole Heap of Mix Up, was published by Lawrence & Wishart.

== Early life ==
Dadzie was born in London to a white English mother and Ghanaian father, who was the first trained pilot in Ghana and after joining the RAF he flew as a navigator in missions over Belgium during the Second World War. Dadzie was in foster care in Wales for about 18 months, before being returned to her mother at the age of four. Interviewed in 2020, Dadzie said: "We experienced poverty, homelessness and racism – my mother was ostracised as she had a black child and was a single parent. We moved around London a huge amount, as we were constantly getting thrown out by racist landlords. There was a lot of pain and suffering." Dadzie did not meet her father and siblings again until she was 12.

== Activism and work ==
As a student in the early 1970s, Dadzie spent a year studying in Germany, where she recalls having experienced "very in-your-face racism". On returning to Britain, she worked with the publication African Red Family and British journal The Black Liberator, selling copies outside Brixton tube station. However, she found them too theoretical. In her twenties, she attended protests in London and Greenham Common.

She was working as a teacher when she became a founder member of the Organisation of Women of African and Asian Descent (OWAAD), active between 1978 and 1982, an umbrella group that challenged white domination of the women's liberation movement of the time. Before co-founding OWAAD, Dadzie was already a part of the Tottenham-based United Black Women's Action Group (UBWAG), where she met Martha Osamor. She had also met Gail Lewis and Gerlin Bean, members of the Brixton Black Women's Group (BBWG). These activists, along with other members of Black women's groups in Britain such as Olive Morris, worked together under OWAAD.

In 1985, The Heart of the Race: Black Women's Lives in Britain was published by Virago Press, having been commissioned by the publisher five years earlier in 1980. The authors, Dadzie, Beverley Bryan and Suzanne Scafe, relied on interviews, weaving together stories to address the experiences of Black women in Britain and the development of the UK's Black Women's Movement. The Heart of the Race won the 1985 Martin Luther King Award for Literature. The book was reissued by Verso (with a new foreword by the Guardian columnist Lola Okolosie) in 2018. In a final chapter added to the new edition, Dadzie states: "In these crucial times we need to remember who we are, remember what we've come from, remember what we've achieved, and never let that be forgotten, because it gives us power, strength and vision. This is what feeds the enthusiasm and the energies of the next generation."

Dadzie has written widely on curriculum development and good practice with black adult learners, and the development of anti-racist strategies with schools, colleges and youth services. Her poetry has been published in Tempa Tupu! Africana Women's Poetic Self-Portrait (Africa World Press, 2008), and in the 2019 anthology New Daughters of Africa (edited by Margaret Busby).

In 2020, Verso published a new book by Dadzie, A Kick in the Belly: Women, Slavery and Resistance, which explores how enslaved women "kicked back" against slavery. She has said that the seeds for the book were planted some decades earlier when she took time off from teaching to study at SOAS, University of London, working on an MA thesis that led her to focus on Jamaica and what life was like for women living on the plantation. As she writes:

"I came to realize that studying history was like detective work. However bloodied or one-sided the evidence, it could be interrogated and interpreted in an infinite number of ways. Then as now, lying by omission was common practice, and nowhere was this more apparent than in regard to black and brown-skinned women. The records, diaries, plantation inventories, abolitionist debates, much of the primary evidence, in fact, had either been written, compiled or interpreted by white males who assumed their experience was not only central but all-embracing. So, despite immersing myself in specialist history texts for months on end, my question continued to rankle: in over 400 years of slavery, with all of its documented horrors, what happened to the women?

The TLS review of A Kick in the Belly commented that Dadzie "puts a narrative of empowerment and hope at the centre of the brutal history of slavery. ... It is a necessary addition to discussions of the legacies of slavery in Britain."

Pluto's 2021 edition of Black People in the British Empire by Peter Fryer carries a foreword by Dadzie, as does the book Hairvolution: Her Hair, Her Story, Our History, by Saskia Calliste and Zainab Raghdo (Supernova Books, 2021).

Dadzie's papers are held at the Black Cultural Archives, where they are among the most visited collections.

== Selected works ==
- The Heart of the Race: Black Women's Lives in Britain, with Beverley Bryan, Suzanne Scafe; Virago, 1985, ISBN 9780860683612. New edition, London: Verso Books, 2018, ISBN 9781786635860
- Essential Skills for Race Equality Trainers, with Andy Forbes, Gurnam Heire; National Institute of Adult Continuing Education, 1992, ISBN 9781872941165
- Older and Wiser: A Study of Educational Provision for Black and Ethnic Minority Elders, National Institute of Adult Continuing Education, 1993, ISBN 9781872941486
- Blood, Sweat and Tears: A Report of the Bede Anti-Racist Detached Youth Work Project, National Youth Agency, 1997, ISBN 978-0861551712
- Toolkit for Tackling Racism in Schools Trentham, 2000, ISBN 9781858561882
- A Kick in the Belly: Women, Slavery and Resistance, Verso, 2020, ISBN 9781788738842
- Hairvolution: Her Hair, Her Story, Our History (foreword), Supernova Books, 2021, ISBN 978-1-913641-13-9
- Encounters with James Baldwin: Celebrating 100 years (contributor), Supernova Books, 2024, ISBN 978-1-913641-41-2
- A Whole Heap of Mix Up, Lawrence & Wishart, 2025, ISBN 9781913546991
