= Organisation of Women of African and Asian Descent =

British activist organisation (1978–1983)

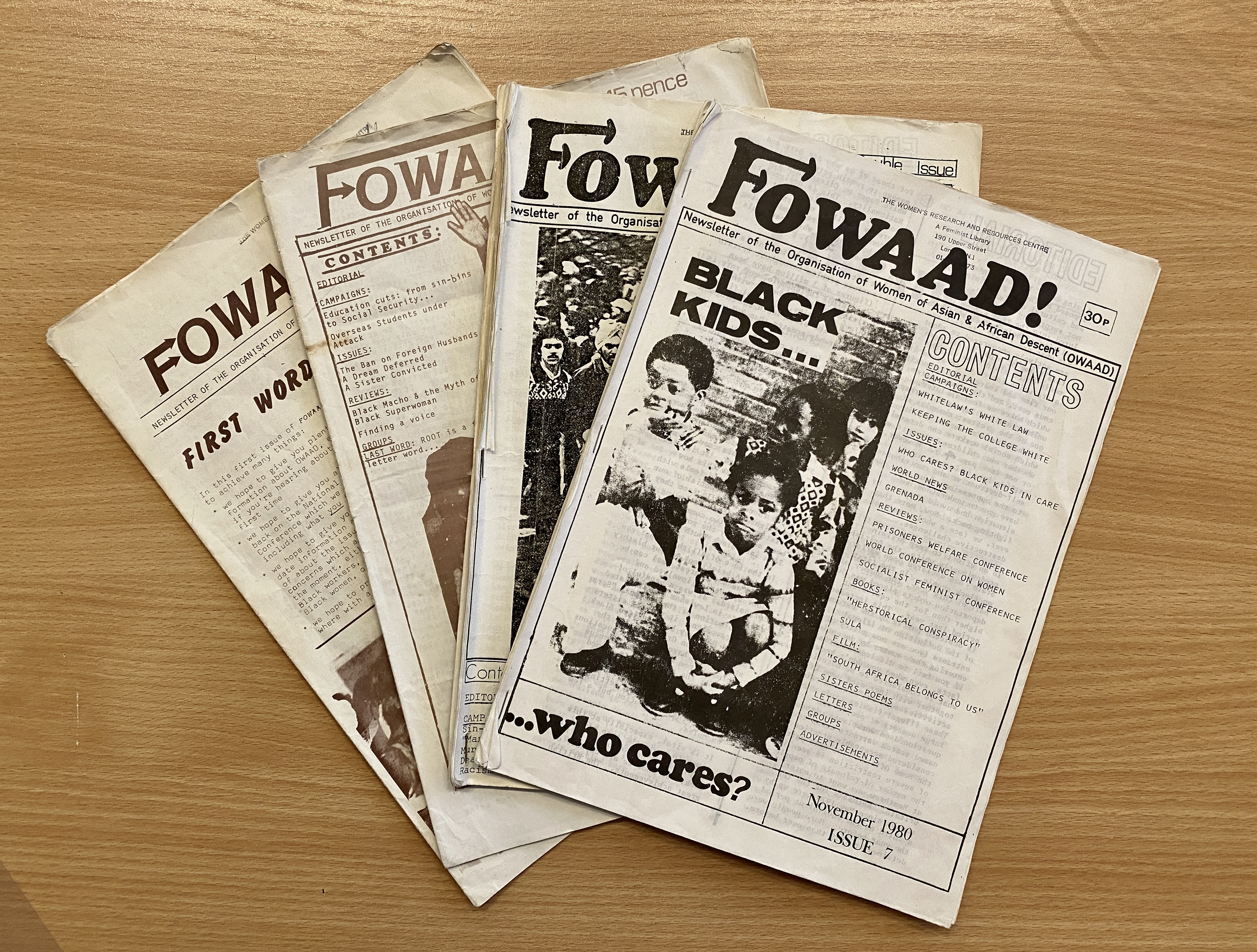
- FOWAAD magazine
- Abbreviation: OWAAD
- Formation: 1978
- Founders: Stella Dadzie; Olive Morris
- Dissolved: 1982
- Headquarters: London

The Organisation of Women of African and Asian Descent (OWAAD) was an activist organisation that focused on issues affecting Black and Asian women in Britain. It was the first national black women's organisation in the United Kingdom. Founded in 1978 by key figures in the British black women's movement Stella Dadzie and Olive Morris, it was active until 1983. Its aims were to organise and respond to political and social injustice, to issues of racism and sexism, and it aimed to highlight the presence and contributions of black British women, and bring a black feminist perspective to contemporary political thought. OWAAD has been called "a watershed in the history of Black women's rights activism".

OWAAD was a broadly socialist, non-hierarchical national umbrella organisation. It held four annual conferences from 1979 to 1982, the first leading to black women's groups being formed nationwide. OWAAD held a sit-in at Heathrow Airport to protest virginity tests being carried out on Asian female immigrants to test their residency and marriage claims.

== Origins of OWAAD ==
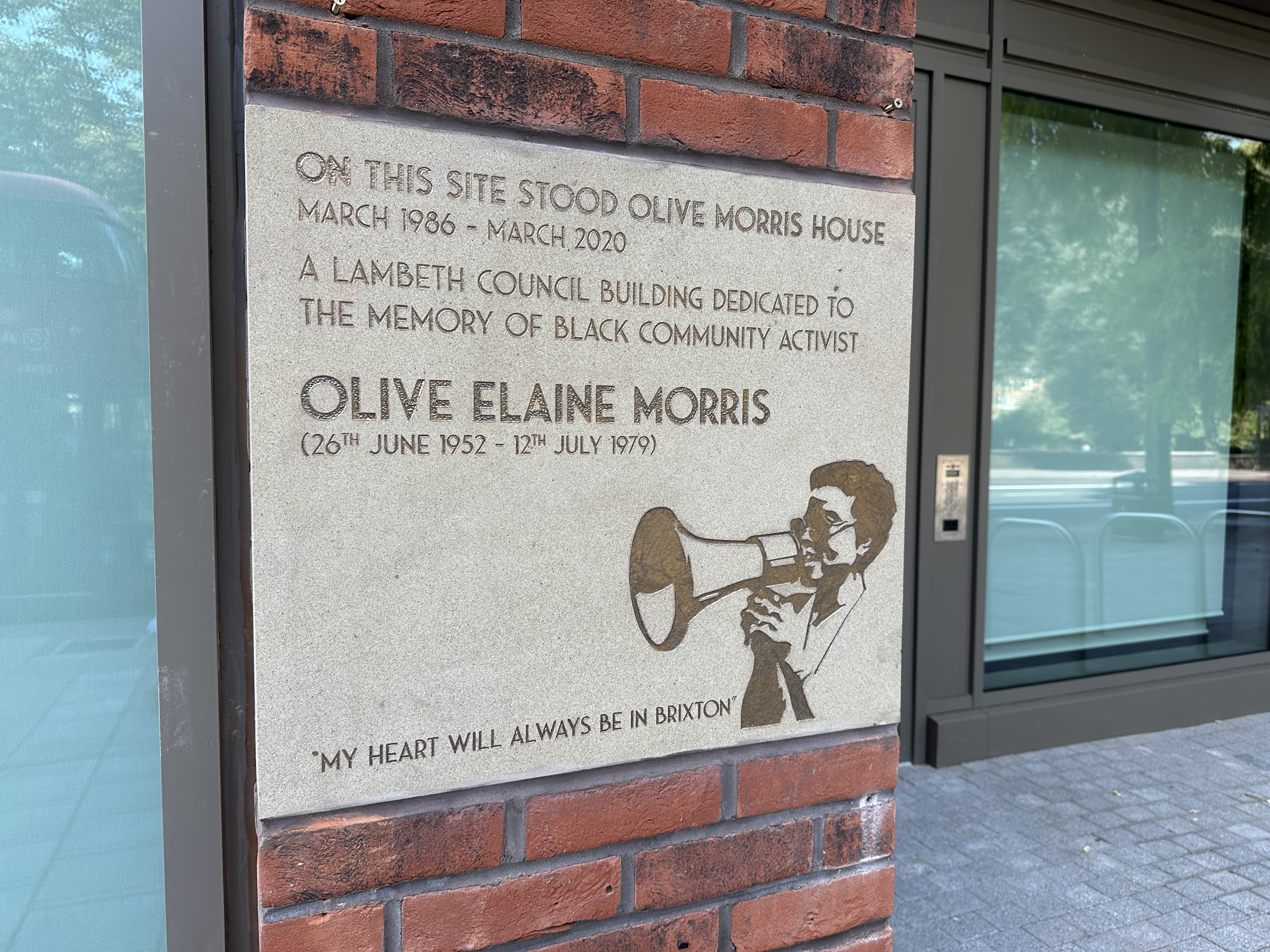
A plaque in Brixton, South London, dedicated to Olive Morris, one of the founders of OWAAD.

Due to the limitations of other activist groups such as African Students' Union (ASU) and British feminist groups that were often dominated by patriarchal male-dominated leaders and white supremacy, the voices and experiences of Black Women were often overlooked. Black women in this group were often seen as "...minute-takers, typists, and coffee-makers but hardly ever as political and intellectual equals." Several members of OWAAD were members of Brixton Black Women's Group, which had been founded in 1973.

Black Women being excluded from anti-racist spaces and feminist spaces has been defined as an effect of intersectionality coined by Kimberle Crenshaw in 1989. Founding members Stella Dadzie, Olive Morris and Gail Lewis created OWAAD to be an independent, national, umbrella organisation of Black women. The original name of the group was "Organisation of Women of Africa and African Descent"; however, realising the commonalities between Black and Asian Women in the UK, the name changed to Organisation of Women of African and Asian Descent.

== Community work ==
OWAAD organised around multiple issues impacting both Black and Asian Women, such as domestic violence, children's rights in school, anti-Black discrimination within policing, and immigration and deportation. OWAAD joined the campaign against Section 4 of the 1824 Vagrancy Act which enabled police officers discretionary power to arrest anyone they deemed as suspicious. This gave British police and the UK Criminal Justice System the power to arrest, charge and convict someone for walking down the street. Black men were disproportionately arrested on this law.

OWAAD also protested for reproductive rights for Black and Asian Women, including agitating against the testing of Depo-Provera, a contraceptive drug on Black, Asian and other marginalised groups. In the 1960s-1970s there were widespread reports of sterilisation abuse directed at women of colour in the USA. New contraceptives in the 1990s such as Depo-Provera aimed to temporarily sterilize women via an intramuscular injection was often given to women of colour as "guinea pigs" within the US and internationally. The documentary film "The Ultimate Test" found that several thousands of African-American women were unaware they were participating in clinical trials of the drug. OWAAD protested that Depo-Provera which had long-term side effects was being used to control the number of children in Black and Asian women.

Virginity testing was often used against Asian women on arrival in the UK in the 1970s. Immigration officers would be able to fast track women into the UK with physical proof that they were unmarried and childless. These virginity tests were used to determine the outcome of a woman's application with the added restrictions of the Immigration Act 1971 that increased discriminatory practices to limit non-white Commonwealth migrants. In 1979 the UK Asian Women's collective (Awaz) and OWAAD organised a protest at Heathrow airport to stop virginity tests that some migrant women were subjected to by immigration services on arrival to the UK.

== Conferences ==
The first OWAAD conference in 1979 was held in Brixton at the Abeng Centre in Gresham Road with a panel of speakers on education, employment, immigration, the health service and more. Issue 87 (October 1979) of Spare Rib magazine covered the conference.

The second conference was held in 1980 and aimed to discuss "Black Women in Britain – Fighting Back". Conferences – Feminist Activist Forum

The third conference was held in 1981 in London

June 1982 saw the final OWAAD conference, with focus on "Black feminism".

== Disbandment ==
OWAAD disbanded in 1982 for a variety of reasons. The group was very diverse, and "struggled to maintain unity between the different perspectives of Asian, Afro-Caribbean and African women". Some members recalled that homophobia within the group contributed to the end of the project.

== Publications and legacy ==
OWAAD published the newsletter FOWAAD after the first National Black Woman's Conference. It aimed to connect all members covering relevant campaigns and listing information on Black feminist groups. It included literature and media reviews and letters from members discussing issues that were oppressing Black and Asian women. The newsletter was part of a wider movement in Black feminist and lesbian activism in the 1970s and 1980s.

OWAAD founders authored the book The Heart of the Race: Black Women's Lives in Britain (1985), which documented the experiences of black women in the UK. The group was also involved in the publication of the journal Sisterhood and the anthology Charting the Journey: Writings by Black and Third World Women (1988).

Members of OWAAD have been interviewed as part of oral history projects, including interviews conducted by artist and activist Ana Laura Lopez De La Torre between 2008 and 2009 for the ‘Do you remember Olive Morris?’ (DYROM) project, held at Lambeth Archives; and in the 2010s by researcher and curator Margaretta Jolly for a project deposited with the British Library, London.

In 2023, Modern Art Oxford commissioned Valerie Asiimwe Amani, a Tanzanian artist and writer, for their summer programme "Boundary Encounters", for which she created an immersive installation in response to the OWAAD archive of newsletters and journals.

== See also ==
- Southall Black Sisters
- Brixton Black Women's Group
- Women's Liberation in the UK
