= Liz Obi =

British activist

Elizabeth Obi is a British activist who was involved in the feminist, black nationalist, and squatters' rights campaigns of the 1970s. A close friend of Olive Morris, in 2009 she founded the Remembering Olive Collective, which researches and documents Morris's life.

== Life ==
Obi was close friends with fellow activist Olive Morris and, in 1972, they attempted to visit Eldridge Cleaver in Algeria, but only made it as far as Morocco. They joined the British Black Panthers together and met other young black feminists and black nationalists such as Jackie Blake, Geneva DaCosta and Stella Dadzie. Also in 1972, the two women squatted a privately owned property above a laundrette at 121 Railton Road in Brixton. Morris and Obi then moved on to another squat at 65 Railton Road. The 121 squat became the 121 Centre and continued to be occupied until 1999. Together with Beverley Bryan, Obi and Morris established the Brixton Black Women's Group (BBWG) in 1973.

In 2008, Obi set up the Remembering Olive Collective (ROC) in tandem with Ana Laura Lopez de la Torre, intending to commemorate the life of Olive Morris.

In 2015, Obi took part in the conference "Black British Feminism: Past, Present and Futures" at the Black Cultural Archives in Brixton organised by a new generation of Black British feminists such as Chardine Taylor-Stone and others.
