= Olive Morris =

Jamaican-born British community leader and activist (1952–1979)

- Born: 26 June 1952; St Catherine, Jamaica
- Died: 12 July 1979 (aged 27); Lambeth, London, England
- Education: London College of Printing; Victoria University of Manchester
- Occupations: Community leader and activist

Olive Elaine Morris (26 June 1952 – 12 July 1979) was a Jamaican-born British-based community leader and activist in the feminist, black nationalist, and squatters' rights campaigns of the 1970s. At the age of 17, she was assaulted by Metropolitan Police officers following an incident involving Clement Gomwalk, a Nigerian diplomat in Brixton, South London. She joined the British Black Panthers, becoming a Marxist–Leninist communist and a radical feminist. She squatted buildings on Railton Road in Brixton; one hosted Sabarr Books and later became the 121 Centre, another was used as offices by the Race Today collective. Morris became a key organiser in the Black Women's Movement in the United Kingdom, co-founding the Brixton Black Women's Group and the Organisation of Women of African and Asian Descent in London.

When Morris studied at the Victoria University of Manchester, her activism continued. She was involved in the Manchester Black Women's Co-operative and travelled to China with the Society for Anglo-Chinese Understanding. After graduating, Morris returned to Brixton and worked at the Brixton Community Law Centre. She became ill and received a diagnosis of non-Hodgkin lymphoma. She died at the age of 27. Her life and work have been commemorated both by official organisations – Lambeth Council named a building after her – and by the activist group the Remembering Olive Collective (ROC). Friends and comrades recalled her as fearless and dedicated to fighting oppression on all levels. She was depicted on the B£1 note of the Brixton Pound and has featured on lists of inspirational black British women.

== Early life ==
Olive Morris was born on 26 June 1952 in Harewood, St Catherine, Jamaica. Her parents were Vincent Nathaniel Morris and Doris Lowena (née Moseley), and she had five siblings. When her parents moved to England, she lived with her grandmother and then followed them to South London at the age of nine. Her father was employed as a forklift driver and her mother worked in factories. Morris went to Heathbrook Primary School, Lavender Hill Girls' Secondary School, and Dick Sheppard School in Tulse Hill, leaving without qualifications. (Note: The Oxford Dictionary of National Biography states: "Olive attended Heathbrook primary school and then Lavender Hill Girls' Secondary School and Tulse Hill secondary school". A BBC News article says "Lavender Hill Primary School and Dick Sheppard School in Tulse Hill". Heathbrook Primary School does exist; Lavender Hill Girls' School was attended by Morris and later closed down in 1979; Dick Sheppard School was for girls only until its closure in 1994 and was attended by Morris; She did not go to Tulse Hill School since it was for boys only.) She later studied for O-Levels and A-levels, and attended a class at the London College of Printing (now named the London College of Communication).

== Adult life and activism ==
In the late 1960s and early 1970s, black British activists embraced the multi-ethnic political discussions concerning black nationalism, classism and imperialism in Africa, Asia and the Caribbean, as well as in the United Kingdom. Their overriding goals were to find their identity, cultural expression and political autonomy by helping their own communities, and others with similar struggles.

Despite the passage of the Race Relations Act 1965, Afro-Caribbean people (alongside other minority groups) continued to experience racism; access to housing and employment was restricted in discriminatory ways and black communities were put under pressure by both the police and fascist groups such as the National Front. To combat these issues, black Britons used anti-colonial strategies and adopted African-inspired forms of cultural expression, drawing on black power movements, or black liberation movements in Angola, Eritrea, Guinea-Bissau, Mozambique and Zimbabwe. Similarly, black British activists challenged ideas of respectability by the choices they made for their adornment, clothing, and hair styles. They listened to reggae and soca from the Caribbean and soul from the United States, and displayed images of internationally known revolutionary figures, such as Che Guevara and Angela Davis. Their fashion sense was also influenced by the civil rights movement.

Morris was drawn into this movement because it allowed her to affirm her Caribbean roots and blackness, while also providing a means for her to fight against problems affecting her community. Just over five feet tall, she gained a reputation as a fierce activist. She was described by other activists as fearless and dedicated, refusing to stand by and allow injustice to occur. Oumou Longley, a gender studies and black history researcher, notes that Morris's identity was complex: "A Jamaican-born woman who grew up in Britain, a squatter with a degree from Manchester University, a woman with a long-term white-skinned partner and a woman who during this time had intimate relationships with other men and women". She deliberately appeared androgynous, adopting a "queer revolutionary soul sister look". Morris smoked, preferred jeans and T-shirts, either went bare-footed or wore comfortable shoes, and wore her hair in a short-cropped Afro. Her personal style choices challenged not only notions of what it meant to be British, but also Caribbean. African-American scholar Tanisha C. Ford observes that Morris was gender-nonconforming in the same way as the activists of the Student Nonviolent Coordinating Committee in the US, who cut their hair short and switched from wearing dresses and pearls to overalls.

=== Mistreatment following the Gomwalk incident ===
On 15 November 1969, Nigerian diplomat Clement Gomwalk was confronted by Metropolitan Police officers while parked outside Desmond's Hip City, the first black record shop in Brixton. The Mercedes-Benz car he was driving bore a different number on the licence plate to that on the licence disc; police officers pulled him from the car and questioned him under the "sus law" (a stop and search power), disputing that he was a diplomat. A crowd formed around them and then a physical altercation took place. Local journalist Ayo Martin Tajo wrote up an account of the events a decade later which stated that Morris pushed through the crowd and attempted to stop the police hitting the diplomat; this led to the police assaulting her and several others. On Morris's own account as published in the Black People's News Service (the newsletter of the British Black Panthers), she arrived after Gomwalk had been arrested and taken away in a police van.

The situation with the police officers escalated after the crowd began to confront them about their brutal treatment of Gomwalk. Morris recalled her friend being dragged away by police, shouting "I've done nothing" as his arm was broken. She did not relate exactly how she became involved, but did record that she was arrested and later beaten in police custody. Since she was dressed in men's clothing and had very short hair, the police believed she was a young man, one of them saying "She ain't no girl". According to Morris' account, she was forced to strip and threatened with rape: "They all made me take off my jumper and my bra in front of them to show I was a girl. A male cop holding a billy club said, 'Now prove you're a real woman.'" Referencing his club (truncheon or baton), he stated: "Look it's the right colour and the right size for you. Black cunt!" Morris's brother Basil described her injuries from the incident, saying that he "could hardly recognize her face, they beat her so badly". She was fined £10 and given a three-year suspended sentence of three months in prison for assaulting a police officer; the term was later reduced to one year. This was a formative experience for Morris, who became a Marxist–Leninist communist and a radical feminist. Her politics were intersectional, focusing on racism worldwide whilst aware of the connections to colonialism, sexism and class discrimination.

=== British Black Panthers ===
Morris decided to campaign against police harassment and joined the youth section of the British Black Panthers at the beginning of the 1970s. The group was not affiliated with the Black Panther Movement in the United States, but shared its focus on improving local communities. The British Panthers promoted Black Power and were pan-African, black nationalist and Marxist-Leninist. Morris was introduced to Altheia Jones-LeCointe, Farrukh Dhondy and Linton Kwesi Johnson and in August 1972, she attempted to meet Eldridge Cleaver, a leader of the US movement, in Algeria; travelling with her friend Liz Obi, she only made it as far as Morocco. They ran out of money and had to ask at the British consulate in Tangier for help to return home.

In the early 1970s, there were many court cases involving black activists on trumped up charges. At the trial of the Mangrove Nine, the Black Panthers organised solidarity pickets; the accused were eventually found not guilty, the judge acknowledging that officers of the Metropolitan Police were racially prejudiced. During the trial of the Oval Four, Morris was arrested after a scuffle with police officers outside the Old Bailey alongside Darcus Howe and another person. The three were charged with assault occasioning actual bodily harm and took a political approach to their subsequent trial, requesting that members of the jury were either black, working-class or both. They researched the background of the judge, John Fitzgerald Marnan, and discovered that as Crown counsel in Kenya he had prosecuted participants in the anti-colonial Mau Mau Uprising. When the case came to trial in October 1972, the nine police officers gave contradictory evidence, including about the footwear Morris had been wearing, a crucial point since she was accused of kicking an officer. The jury acquitted her and the other defendants.

Upon the demise of the British Black Panthers, Morris founded the Brixton Black Women's Group with Obi and Beverley Bryan in 1973. The collective explored the experience of women in the Black Panther Party and aimed to provide a space for Asian and black women to discuss political and cultural matters more generally. It was critical of white feminism, finding that issues such as abortion and wages for housework were not central to the black experience, since participants were more concerned about childcare and getting paid for their cleaning jobs. The group was organised non-hierarchically; it published the newsletter Speak Out and produced The Heart of the Race: Black Women's Lives in Britain, which was published by Virago Press in 1985. Three women from the collective were credited as authors because the publisher refused to use a collective name. Dedicated to Morris, the book was republished by Verso Books in 2018.

=== Squatting in Brixton ===
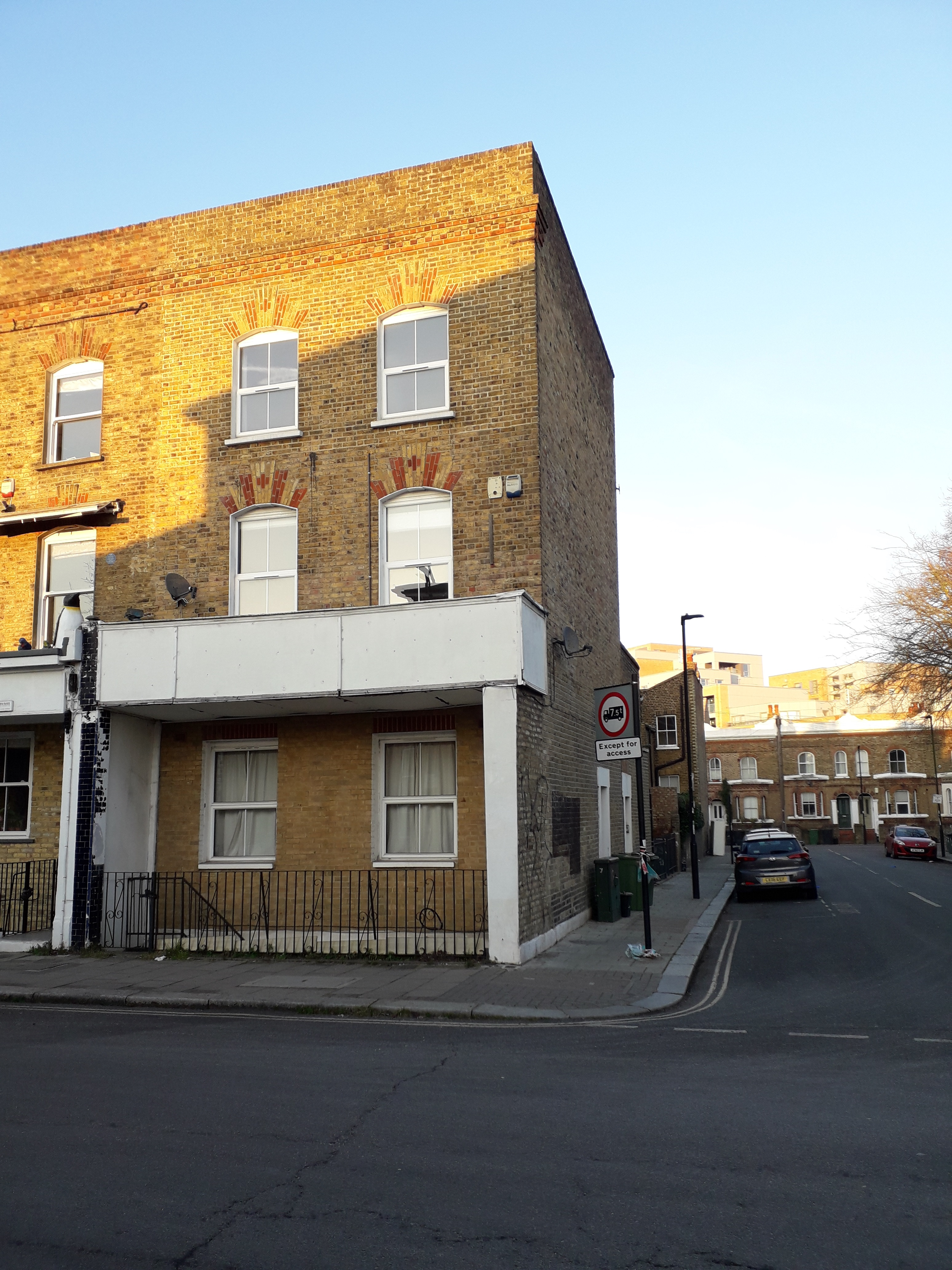
121 Railton Road in 2023

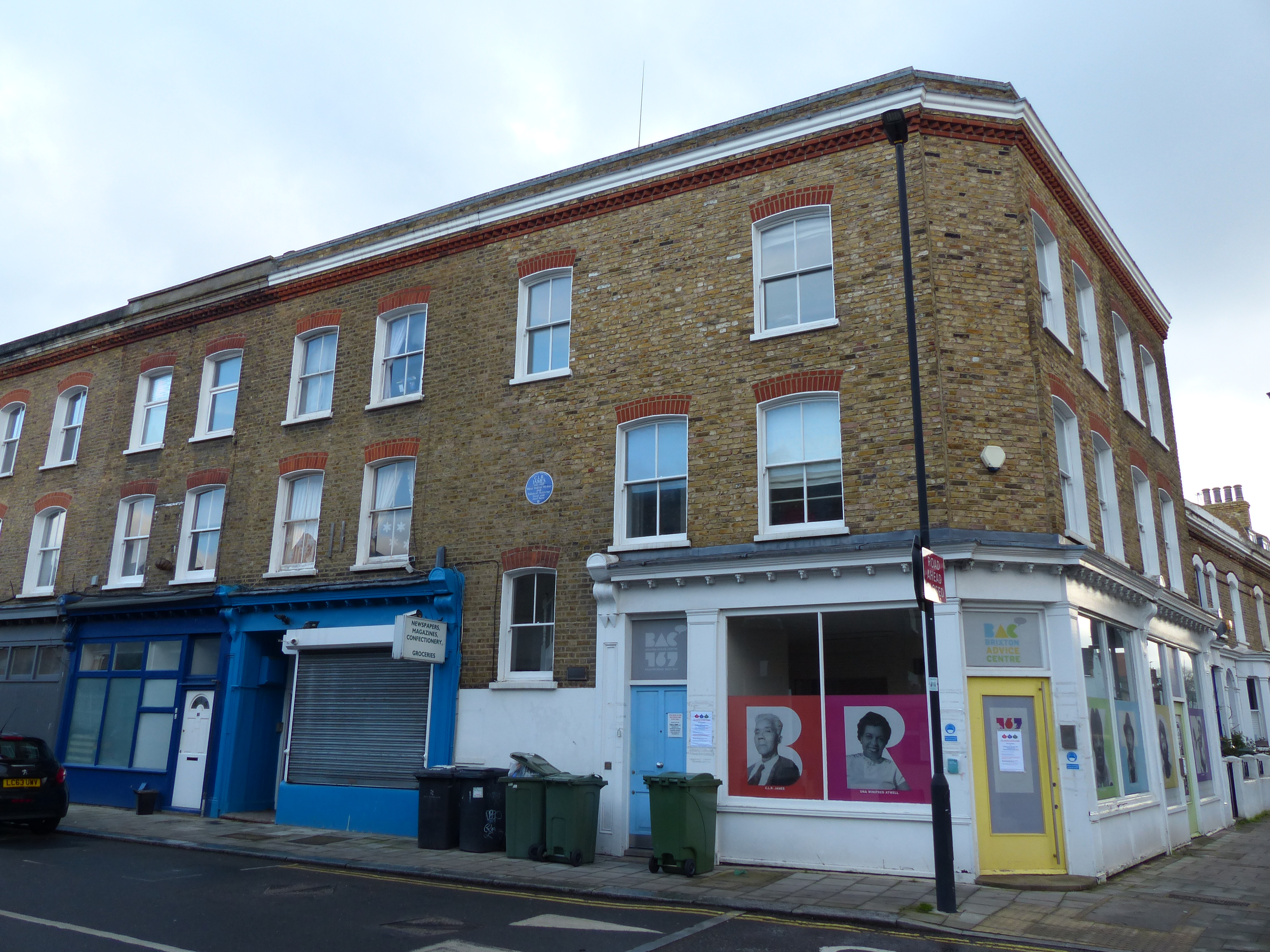
165–167 Railton Road, where Race Today was produced and C. L. R. James lived. The blue plaque commemorating James' residency is visible in the centre of the photograph.

Having begun to squat buildings in Brixton on account of housing need, Morris came to see occupation as a means to establish political projects. Squatting provided a way for the Brixton Black Women's Group to remain autonomous from the broader women's liberation movement in England. In 1973, Morris squatted 121 Railton Road with Liz Obi. When workers broke in and took away their belongings, Morris and Obi quickly re-squatted the house and made a deal with the estate agent. Speaking to the London daily newspaper The Evening Standard, Morris said "the prices for flats and bedsits are too high for me". The Advisory Service for Squatters used a photograph of Morris climbing up the back wall of the squat on the cover of its 1979 Squatters Handbook. The building became a hub of political activism, hosting community groups such as Black People against State Harassment and the Brixton Black Women's Group. Sabarr Bookshop was set up by a group of local black men and women that included Morris and through it, activists were able to work with schools to provide black history reading materials for a more diverse curriculum. Morris and Obi then moved on to another squat at 65 Railton Road.

The 121 squat later became an anarchist self-managed social centre known as the 121 Centre, which existed until 1999. Anthropologist Faye V. Harrison lived with Morris and her sister in the mid-1970s; she later recalled that Morris saw housing as a human right and squatting as direct action to provide shelter, so she was keen to encourage other people to squat. Morris was also involved with the Race Today collective, which featured Farrukh Dhondy, Leila Hassan, Darcus Howe and Gus John. When it split from the Institute of Race Relations in 1974, she helped it find a base in the squats of Brixton. The offices were eventually located at 165–167 Railton Road, where the collective produced the magazine and held discussion sessions in the basement. C. L. R. James lived on the top floor of the building. The offices later became the Brixton Advice Centre.

=== Manchester ===
Morris studied economics and social science at the Victoria University of Manchester from 1975 until 1978. She quickly integrated with grassroots political organisations in Moss Side, co-founding the Black Women's Mutual Aid Group and meeting local activists such as Kath Locke and Elouise Edwards. Locke had set up the Manchester Black Women's Co-operative (MBWC) in 1975 with Coca Clarke and Ada Phillips; Morris got involved and members later recalled her vigour. She also campaigned against the university's plans to increase tuition fees for overseas students. After her death, the MWBC folded due to financial mismanagement and reformed as the Abasindi Women's Co-operative; from its base in the Moss Side People's Centre, Abasindi organised educational, cultural and political activities without any public funding.

Morris helped to establish a supplementary school after campaigning with local black parents for better education provision for their children, and a black bookshop. As part of her internationalist perspective she participated in the National Co-ordinating Committee of Overseas Students and travelled to Italy and Northern Ireland. In 1977, she travelled to China with the Society for Anglo-Chinese Understanding and wrote "A Sister's Visit to China" for the newsletter of the Brixton Black Women's Group. The article analysed anti-imperialist praxis and community organisation in China.

=== Return to Brixton ===
After graduating in 1978, Morris returned to Brixton and worked at the Brixton Community Law Centre. With her partner Mike McColgan she wrote "Has the Anti-Nazi League got it right on racism?" for the Brixton Ad-Hoc Committee against Police Repression. The pamphlet questioned whether the Anti-Nazi League was correct to fight fascism whilst ignoring institutional racism. With educationalists Beverley Bryan and Stella Dadzie, plus other women, Morris set up the Organisation of Women of African and Asian Descent (OWAAD) in London. It held its first conference at the Abeng Centre in Brixton, which Morris had helped to found. Bryan later remembered Morris as a "strong personality".

At the conference, 300 African, Asian and Caribbean women from cities including Birmingham, Brighton, Bristol, Leeds, London, Manchester and Sheffield came together to discuss issues that concerned them, such as housing, employment, health and education. OWAAD aimed to be an umbrella group linking struggles and empowering women, whilst also opposing racism, sexism and other forms of oppression. Alongside the Brixton Black Women's Group, OWAAD was one of the first organisations for black women in the United Kingdom. Morris edited FOWAD!, the group's newsletter, which continued to publish after her death.

== Death ==
Whilst on a cycling trip in Spain with McColgan in 1978, Morris began to feel ill. Upon her return to London, she went to King's College Hospital and was sent away with tablets for flatulence, only to later receive a diagnosis of non-Hodgkin lymphoma in September. The cancer treatment was unsuccessful and she died on 12 July 1979 at St Thomas' Hospital, Lambeth, at the age of 27. Her grave is at Streatham Vale Cemetery.

== Recognition and legacy ==
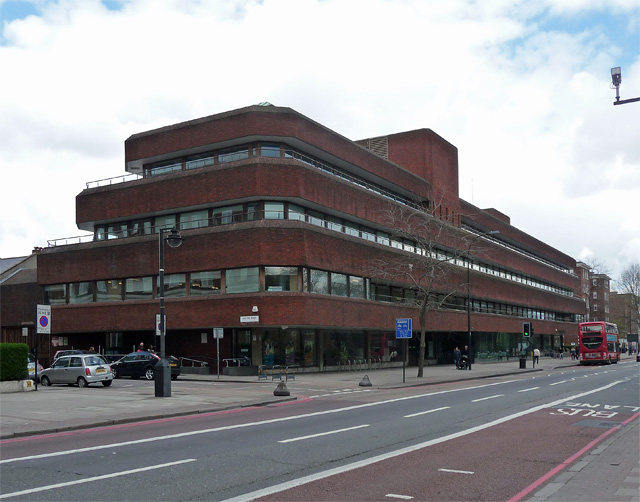
Olive Morris House at 18 Brixton Hill, in 2013. It was demolished in 2020.

Alongside other women such as Liz Obi, Morris played an important part in the creation of a feminist Black Power movement in the UK and anthropologist Tracy Fisher describes her contributions as "immeasurable". The Brixton Black Women's Group published an obituary in the third issue of its newsletter praising Morris for her "total dedication to the struggles for liberation, democracy and socialism". In his 1980 poetry collection Inglan Is A Bitch, Linton Kwesi Johnson published "Jamaica Lullaby" in memory of Morris. Lambeth Council named its new building at 18 Brixton Hill after her in 1986, following a campaign by the Brixton Black Women's Group. The local housing benefit office was based there; Morris had demonstrated outside the office for better housing rights.

The naming of the building followed the 1985 Brixton riot, which had been triggered by the police shooting of Cherry Groce; it was demolished in 2020. A playground was also named after Morris in Myatt's Fields.

In 2000, Obi put on an exhibition about Morris at Brixton Library. Ana Laura López de la Torre launched the "Remember Olive Morris" blog in 2007 to commemorate Morris' legacy and the following year the Remembering Olive Collective (ROC) was launched, with members including Ford and Obi. It commemorated the life of Morris, collating information and situating her experiences within a broader history of black Brixton; the pamphlet Do You Remember Olive Morris? was published in 2010 and distributed to local schools in Lambeth. ROC set up the Olive Morris Memorial Awards in 2011, in order to offer financial support to women of African or Asian descent aged between 16 and 27. In 2019, the collective was re-launched as ROC 2.0 since the council building bearing Morris's name was scheduled for demolition and the group wanted to ensure that she would continue to be remembered.

Ford sees ROC as driven by community historians, who in the UK are often behind projects such as the Black Cultural Archives, the Feminist Library and the George Padmore Institute. De la Torre and Obi deposited the materials they had collected into the Olive Morris Collection at the Lambeth Archives. The archives were based at the Minet Library until it was announced in 2020 that they would move to the new Olive Morris House, which would be constructed on the site of the old building as part of the Your New Town Hall housing project.

Morris is depicted on the B£1 note of the Brixton Pound, a local currency. In 2017, a mural entitled "SAY IT LOUD" was painted in the Blenheim Gardens housing estate in Brixton, as part of the Watch This Space initiative. It was painted by the South African artist Breeze Yoko and draws on his character "Boniswa", while also paying homage to Morris. In celebration of the 100th anniversary of most women gaining the right to vote in 2018, The Voice listed eight black women who have contributed to the development of Britain: Morris, Kathleen Wrasama, Connie Mark, Fanny Eaton, Diane Abbott, Lilian Bader, Margaret Busby, and Mary Seacole. Morris was also named by the Evening Standard on a list of 14 "Inspirational Black British Women Throughout History" alongside Seacole, Mark, Busby, Abbott, Claudia Jones, Adelaide Hall, Joan Armatrading, Tessa Sanderson, Doreen Lawrence, Maggie Aderin-Pocock, Sharon White, Malorie Blackman, and Zadie Smith. Morris was recognised with a Google Doodle in the UK on 26 June 2020 to mark what would have been her 68th birthday. Morris's life and activism was dramatised in the BAFTA-nominated 2023 short film The Ballad of Olive Morris.

In 2021, Olive Morris Court opened in Tottenham, on the site of a former storage yard. The project included 33 modular-homes designed to support people experiencing homelessness and rough-sleeping .

In October 2024, Morris was commemorated with an English Heritage blue plaque that was unveiled at 121 Railton Road.
