= Beverley Bryan =

Jamaican academic (born 1949)

- Born: 18 August 1949 (age 76); Portland, Colony of Jamaica, British Empire
- Education: Keele University; University of London
- Occupations: Educationalist, activist, academic
- Notable work: The Heart of the Race: Black Women's Lives in Britain (co-author; 1985)

Beverley Bryan (born 18 August 1949) is a Jamaican educationist and retired academic who was a professor of language education at the University of the West Indies in Mona. Settling in Britain with her parents in the late 1950s, she went on to become a founding member of the Brixton Black Women's Group and co-authored the 1985 book The Heart of the Race: Black Women's Lives in Britain.

== Early life ==
Bryan was born in Portland, Jamaica, but immigrated to England in 1959 to join her parents who had gone ahead to Britain in 1953, as part of the "Windrush generation". She and her parents eventually settled in Brixton, London, which had a large Afro-Caribbean community. Bryan studied teaching at Keele University, Staffordshire, and moved back to Brixton to teach at a primary school. Bryan later undertook further studies at the University of London, graduating with a B.A. in English, an M.A. and Ph.D. in language education. She was a member of the British Black Panthers in the early 1970s, and later together with such activists as Olive Morris and Liz Obi helped to found the Brixton-based Black Women's Group (BWG), a collective that shared similar radical views.

Bryan co-authored with Stella Dadzie and Suzanne Scafe the book The Heart of the Race, a collaborative work that came about through the concerns of the BWG, which was published in 1985 by Virago Press. Speaking of the focus of the BWG, Bryan has noted: "Women came to us with issues from their workplace, incidents in hospitals or health centres; with their care of their children’s case of abuse from the police or schools... This came to the fore and so by the time I came to co-author Heart of the Race, we had the full range of the lives and stories that we could draw on." The book was reissued in 2018 by Verso Books, with a new foreword by Lola Okolosie, and including an interview with the authors by Heidi Safia Mirza, focusing on the impact of the book since publication and its continuing relevance.

In June 2020, Bryan spoke about her involvement with the Black Panther Movement in a rare interview with Tell A Friend podcast. She spoke about the challenges she experienced during the 1970s era of racial discrimination.

== Career ==
In 1992, Bryan moved back to Jamaica to join the University of the West Indies (UWI) as a lecturer in educational studies. She was promoted to senior lecturer in 2002 and to professor in 2011, and served as head of the Department of Educational Studies. Bryan is a leading authority on Jamaican Creole learners of English, and has worked as a consultant to the Ministry of Education on language policy. She has also advised other Caribbean governments on literacy policies, as well as serving as a member of the United Nations Literacy Decade Experts' Group.

She was one of the founders of the Caribbean Poetry Project launched in 2010, a collaboration between UWI and the University of Cambridge that aims to increase the visibility of Caribbean writers in the UK.

Bryan was the keynote speaker at the Eighth Annual Huntley Conference in 2013, addressing the topic "Educating Our Children, Liberating Our Futures".

She is a contributor to the 2019 anthology New Daughters of Africa (edited by Margaret Busby) with "A Windrush Story".

In 2021, Bryan delivered the Windrush Day Online Lecture, entitled "Key Moments and Issues In The Black British Civil Rights Movement: A Brief History Of Our Story/Journey (So Far)".

== Selected works ==
- As a member of the Brixton Black Women's Group, Bryan contributed to the group's newsletter, Speak Out.
- The Heart of the Race: Black Women's Lives in Britain, with Stella Dadzie, Suzanne Scafe; Virago Press, 1985, ISBN 9780860683612. New edition with Introduction by Lola Okolosie, Verso Books, 2018, ISBN 9781786635860
- Between Two Grammars: Language Learning and Teaching in a Creole-speaking Environment, Ian Randle Publishers, 2010, ISBN 978-9766373528
