= Brixton Black Women's Group =

Organisation for black women in Brixton, London

- Abbreviation: BWG
- Formation: 1973
- Dissolved: 1989
- Purpose: Socialist feminist organising
- Headquarters: London
- Publication: Speak Out newsletter

The Brixton Black Women's Group (BWG) was an organisation for Black women in Brixton, London, England. One of the first Black women's groups in the UK, the BWG existed from 1973 to 1989. BWG members were also involved in Organisation of Women of African and Asian Descent (OWAAD) and members were integral in organising the OWAAD conferences from 1979 and 1982.

== Politics ==
Established as a socialist feminist group, BWG's aim was to provide a space for women of African and Asian descent to meet and organise around issues specific to their experiences.

Member Melba Wilson explained in a 2018 interview how BWG's aims also looked beyond the local area, to make connections between local and global justice:

It was about joining forces with anti-imperialist struggle and anti-capitalist struggle. It was about creating a different kind of movement whose basis was about a more egalitarian and equal way of distributing wealth. Also acknowledging the diverse kind of groupings that existed at that time. Actually, what we are doing still feels very relevant today, connections can still be made in terms of fighting for independence and solidarity with many oppressed groups around the world.

== Foundation ==
Several of the group's founding members, including Beverley Bryan, Olive Morris and Liz Obi, had previously been active in the British Black Panthers. BWG was formed partly from frustrations that although there was a women's caucus, the Panthers were not taking women's issues seriously.

For its first two years, the group lacked a dedicated meeting space and met in members' homes, or at a squat at 121 Railton Road, Brixton. They also met at Lambeth Women's Project. Later, together with the Mary Seacole Craft Group, the BWG established the Mary Seacole House on Clapham High Street, renamed the Black Women's Centre in 1979.

== Publications ==
From 1979 to 1983, the BWG published the Speak Out newsletter. The newsletter was written collectively by members of the BWG and provided a space to further discuss issues about the relationship between feminism, the women's liberation movement and the Black liberation movement in the UK. The newsletter also published articles related to key campaigns around housing, education, reproductive rights, and politics.

Speak Out was anthologised in a book published in 2023, Speak Out!: The Brixton Black Women's Group.

== Notable members ==
- Beverley Bryan
- Stella Dadzie
- Gail Lewis
- Amina Mama
- Olive Morris
- Liz Obi
- Dorothea Smartt
- Clover Graham

== See also ==
- Organisation of Women of African and Asian Descent
- Southall Black Sisters
- British Black Panthers
- Women's Liberation in the UK
