= OTD =

OTD may refer to:

- Doctor of Occupational Therapy (OTD)
- OTD (company)
- ObjecTime Developer
- Observed Time Difference, see E-OTD
- Off the derech, a term for someone who has left an Orthodox Jewish community
- Operational Technology Division, part of the FBI's Data Intercept Technology Unit
- Ot Danum language (ISO 639-3 code: OTD)
- Contadora Airport (IATA: OTD), Panama
- Old Taiwan dollar, the former currency of Taiwan
- Order to Delivery (OTD), a concept similar to Build to order
- Out Time Days, a science fiction play-by-mail wargame published in 1985
