= AllSaints =

British fashion retailer

- Industry: Fashion
- Founded: 1994
- Headquarters: London, United Kingdom
- Number of locations: 281 stores
- Area served: Worldwide
- Number of employees: 2,200
- Website: www.AllSaints.com

AllSaints (formerly AllSaints Spitalfields) is a British fashion retailer headquartered in London, United Kingdom. AllSaints sells menswear, womenswear, footwear, and accessories in 281 stores, and has approximately 2,400 employees across 27 countries and regions including the UK, France, Ireland, US, Mexico, Canada, Taiwan, Japan, South Korea and China.

== History ==
=== Founding (1994–1998) ===
AllSaints was founded in 1994 by Stuart Trevor and Kait Bolongaro, who was the original womenswear designer at AllSaints and who went on to start Bolongaro Trevor. AllSaints started as a wholesale menswear brand that sold exclusively to high-end retailers such as Harvey Nichols and Harrods. The company was named after Stuart Trevor's nickname, "The Saint", from his initials "ST", and All Saints Road in Notting Hill, London, where he spent much of his time. The first stand-alone AllSaints store was opened in Foubert Place off Carnaby Street in London on AllSaints Day in 1997. The company's first womenswear collection followed the next year in 1998.

=== Growth and expansion (1999–2018) ===
By mid-2004, AllSaints had expanded to 10 stores in the UK. Between mid-2004 and the end of 2005, fashion financier Kevin Stanford, co-founder of womenswear chain Karen Millen, bought out each of AllSaints partners besides Stuart Trevor, thereby acquiring a majority stake in the company. In December 2005, Stanford bought Trevor's stake in the company as well. In 2006, AllSaints sold a 35% stake in the company to Icelandic investment firm, Baugur Group, with Kevin Stanford remaining the majority shareholder. In late 2006, the company launched its e-commerce website.

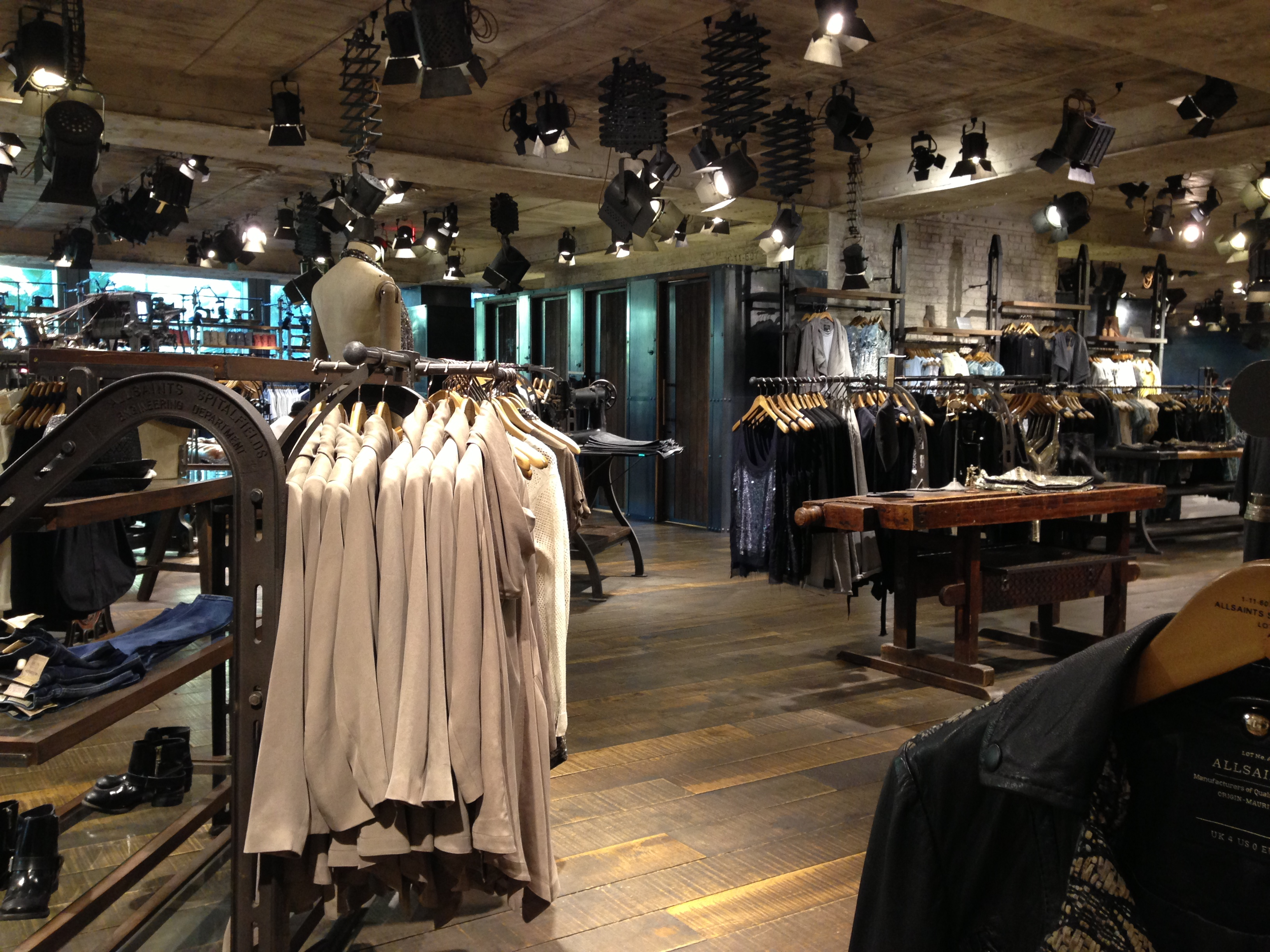
AllSaints store at the Cosmopolitan of Las Vegas in Las Vegas, Nevada

In 2009-2010, AllSaints rapidly expanded globally, launching a US-specific e-commerce site and opening its first US store in New York. Following this, AllSaints opened stores across the United States; including in Boston, Los Angeles, San Francisco, Miami, Las Vegas, Washington, D.C., Santa Monica, Seattle and Chicago. By 2010, the cost of North American expansion was £43 million. Approximately half of the revenues now come from overseas.

In 2016, AllSaints launched its first stores in Italy, Turkey, Chile, Peru, Qatar, Taiwan and Dubai.

In October 2018, AllSaints partnered with Revlon to launch its first fragrance line featuring Metal Wave, Incense City, and Sunset Riot.

=== Acquisition by Lion Capital (2011–12) ===
In April 2011, due to rapid expansion and the collapse of Icelandic investment firm Baugur Group, All Saints was £53 million in debt and on the brink of collapse. In May 2011, citing AllSaints' international potential and online presence, Lion Capital LLP, the British private equity firm headed by Lyndon Lea, combined with Goode Partners to purchase a 76% stake in AllSaints Spitalfields for £105 million. Lion Capital effectively saved AllSaints from collapse, which would have resulted in the loss of 3,000 jobs. The firm began to take an active role in day-to-day management and hired 8 new top executives to manage the company. In 2012, Wil Beedle, formerly men’s design director, was appointed Chief Creative Officer, overseeing the design and creative vision for all product categories.

In March 2012, Goode Partners sold its 11% stake to Lion Capital as well as another 11% stake it held with other co-investors.

=== William Kim leadership (2012–2018) ===
In 2012, Lion Capital brought in William Kim, an industry veteran whose career included several years at Gucci Group and most recently, Burberry, to be Chief Executive Officer. Under CEO William Kim’s leadership, the company turned around its fortunes, with a revenue increase of 6% to £231.1 million in the year to 31 January 2015 and, in the same period, an increase of 41% in EBITDA to £24.4 million.

Kim was responsible for the company's expansion into Asia, where he focused on the airport retail sector. Kim's tenure as CEO also saw the company increase its focus on digital retail with the launch of AllSaints.com.

Kim left AllSaints in 2018 to become the head of digital investment at parent company Lion Capital.

=== Wood leadership (2018–present) ===
Peter Wood has been employed by AllSaints since 2010, holding a number of positions such as CFO, COO, and interim CEO before he became CEO in 2018, including presiding over the HR function during the time when a woman introduced to Lyndon Lea by Epstein was employed by AllSaints In the year to February 2019, AllSaints' revenues grew to £331 million. Wood has developed the business in three areas: increased investment in core apparel, expansion into digital and social media marketing (including using AllSaints staff as online advocates) and developing its wholesale, concessions, franchising and licensing offerings.

In the year to February 2020, AllSaints’ revenues grew 10% to reach £364.1m. In the same period, operating profit rose 161% to £9.4m, making it the best financial performance in the brand's history. The performance was driven by growth in every channel and trading region. The company is reported to have seen online sales increase by 70% in the first half of its current financial year.

Following the coronavirus pandemic of 2020, AllSaints filed for Chapter 15 bankruptcy in the US in June 2020, and undertook a company voluntary arrangement in the UK in July 2020, in an effort to move the majority of its UK and North America stores to turnover-based rents. In a statement, the company said this was to "ensure the long-term viability" of the business. AllSaints Canada went into creditor protection under the Companies' Creditors Arrangement Act in December 2020.

In 2020, US menswear brand John Varvatos was purchased by AllSaints’ owner, Lion Capital. The following year, the brand was integrated into AllSaints.

In 2022, AllSaints suspended trading in Russia due to the Russian aggression in Ukraine.

In the year to January 2022, company revenues increased to £337 million. This included four months’ trading performance of John Varvatos, which was acquired by AllSaints in October 2021. In the same period, the company’s operating profit grew to £10.1 million, compared to £0.7 million in the previous year. In the six months to July 2022, revenues for AllSaints and John Varvatos increased by 36% and 13% respectively, owing to better-than-forecast footfall and digital conversions.

In the year to January 2023, AllSaints reported a 36% increase in sales to £457 million and a 50% increase in profit to £58.6 million. The company said this was a record sales and profit performance, and attributed it to product development, a new e-commerce platform, a growing global store network and rigorous inventory management. The results included a full year of trading for John Varvatos, the New York-based alternative luxury menswear brand.

== Controversy ==
In 2026, it emerged that AllSaints chairman, and owner via his Lion Capital firm, Lyndon Lea maintained a friendship with Jeffrey Epstein following Epstein's release from prison in late 2009 for soliciting a child for prostitution. According to emails in the Epstein files between Lea and Epstein, Lea attended a dinner hosted by Jean-Luc Brunel , who died in prison in 2022 while being held for rape and trafficking of minors. On January 18, 2010 Epstein emailed Brunel saying: “It would be nice and i thinnk beneficial for you to have a dinner for lyndon lea. in new york this week.” Brunel replied: “Done …I am inviting also 10 models. You can tell him.” Lea was introduced by Epstein to a young Romanian woman, who he referred first to an internship at Findus and later to AllSaints, where she wrote to Epstein that she was working as the executive assistant to CEO William Kim, and then described: "Also, wanted you to see William Kim, my ex-boss...current bf :) let me know what you think :)". Wood and his wife attended Lyndon Lea’s wedding to a lingerie model Lea met when she was 18. Wood wrote, on AllSaints 30th birthday: “Without our chairman Lyndon Lea whose firm has owned and supported us for almost as long as I’ve been here, we wouldn’t be celebrating today.”

== Products and aesthetic ==
AllSaints sells menswear, womenswear, footwear, and accessories through its department store locations, stand-alone retail stores and its website. The brand launched its first comprehensive handbag line, "The Capital Collection", in September 2015.

== In popular culture ==
AllSaints has had a connection to popular culture since its founding in 1994 when it was named after a famous London street (All Saints Road in Notting Hill). Young American and British celebrities are seen and photographed wearing AllSaints clothes to events and entering or leaving AllSaints stores.

=== Music ===
The company's strongest connection to date has been to the music industry, where they have collaborated with many established musical acts, including: Kings of Leon, Blonde Redhead, and the Dum Dum Girls. AllSaints hosts a series of live music performances in Los Angeles titled "The LA Sessions". including global artists such as OneRepublic and Mikky Ekko.

In 2010, the English rapper Tinie Tempah released a single titled "Frisky" that entered the UK Singles Chart at #2 and mentioned the brand in one of the lyrics: "I think I found a winner, with no ring around her finger. Her dress from AllSaints, but I think I’ve found a sinner". In 2013, Justin Timberlake released a single titled "Suit & Tie" featuring Jay-Z in which Jay-Z also mentioned the brand in the lyrics: "Tom Ford tuxedos for no reason. AllSaints for my angel. Alexander Wang too".

=== Activism and philanthropy ===
In addition to music, AllSaints is also active in social causes and public service. In Summer 2011, the company entered into a long-term partnership with the Not For Sale organization and launched a T-shirt line whose profits go toward combating human trafficking. Later that year, AllSaints released a short documentary titled Voices of the Cloth intended to promote British design and manufacturing.

AllSaints also supports UK homeless charity Shelter, as well as charity partnerships with LGBTQ+ rights charity Kaleidoscope Trust and anti-racism charity Black Minds Matter UK.

AllSaints is a member of the Better Cotton Initiative and in 2020 joined the British Retail Consortium’s Climate pledge to reduce to net-zero emissions by 2040.
