= Radiolocation =

Process of finding the location of something using radio waves

Radiolocation, also known as radiolocating or radiopositioning, is the process of finding the location of something through the use of radio waves. It generally refers to passive, particularly radar—as well as detecting buried cables, water mains, and other public utilities. It is similar to radionavigation in which one actively seeks its own position; both are types of radiodetermination. Radiolocation is also used in real-time locating systems (RTLS) for tracking valuable assets.

== Basic principles ==
An object can be located by measuring the characteristics of received radio waves. The radio waves may be transmitted by the object to be located, or they may be backscattered waves (as in radar or passive RFID). A stud finder uses radiolocation when it uses radio waves rather than ultrasound.

One technique measures a distance by using the difference in the power of the received signal strength (RSSI) as compared to the originating signal strength. Another technique uses the time of arrival (TOA), when the time of transmission and speed of propagation are known. Combining TOA data from several receivers at different known locations (time difference of arrival, TDOA) can provide an estimate of position even in the absence of knowledge of the time of transmission. The angle of arrival (AOA) at a receiving station can be determined by the use of a directional antenna, or by differential time of arrival at an array of antennas with known location. AOA information may be combined with distance estimates from the techniques previously described to establish the location of a transmitter or backscatterer. Alternatively, the AOA at two receiving stations of known location establishes the position of the transmitter. The use of multiple receivers to locate a transmitter is known as multilateration.

Estimates are improved when the transmission characteristics of the medium is factored into the calculations. For RSSI this means electromagnetic permeability; for TOA it may mean non-line-of-sight receptions.

Use of RSSI to locate a transmitter from a single receiver requires that both the transmitted (or backscattered) power from the object to be located are known, and that the propagation characteristics of the intervening region are known. In empty space, signal strength decreases as the inverse square of the distance for distances large compared to a wavelength and compared to the object to be located, but in most real environments, a number of impairments can occur: absorption, refraction, shadowing, and reflection. Absorption is negligible for radio propagation in air at frequencies less than about 10 GHz, but becomes important at multi-GHz frequencies where rotational molecular states can be excited. Refraction is important at long ranges (tens to hundreds of kilometers) due to gradients in moisture content and temperature in the atmosphere. In urban, mountainous, or indoor environments, obstruction by intervening obstacles and reflection from nearby surfaces are very common, and contribute to multipath distortion: that is, reflected and delayed replicates of the transmitted signal are combined at the receiver. Signals from different paths can add constructively or destructively: such variations in amplitude are known as fading. The dependence of signal strength on position of transmitter and receiver becomes complex and often non-monotonic, making single-receiver estimates of position inaccurate and unreliable. Multilateration using many receivers is often combined with calibration measurements ("fingerprinting") to improve accuracy.

TOA and AOA measurements are also subject to multipath errors, particularly when the direct path from the transmitter to receiver is blocked by an obstacle. Time of arrival measurements are also most accurate when the signal has distinct time-dependent features on the scale of interest—for example, when it is composed of short pulses of known duration—but Fourier transform theory shows that in order to change amplitude or phase on a short time scale, a signal must use a broad bandwidth. For example, to create a pulse of about 1 ns duration, roughly sufficient to identify location to within 0.3 m (1 foot), a bandwidth of roughly 1 GHz is required. In many regions of the radio spectrum, emission over such a broad bandwidth is not allowed by the relevant regulatory authorities, in order to avoid interference with other narrowband users of the spectrum. In the United States, unlicensed transmission is allowed in several bands, such as the 902-928 MHz and 2.4-2.483 GHz Industrial, Scientific, and Medical ISM bands, but high-power transmission cannot extend outside of these bands. However, several jurisdictions now allow ultrawideband transmission over GHz or multi-GHz bandwidths, with constraints on transmitted power to minimize interference with other spectrum users. UWB pulses can be very narrow in time, and often provide accurate estimates of TOA in urban or indoor environments.

Radiolocation is employed in a wide variety of industrial and military activities. Radar systems often use a combination of TOA and AOA to determine a backscattering object's position using a single receiver. In Doppler radar, the Doppler shift is also taken into account, determining velocity rather than location (though it helps determine future location). Real Time Location Systems RTLS using calibrated RTLS, and TDOA, are commercially available. The widely used Global Positioning System (GPS) is based on TOA of signals from satellites at known positions.

== Mobile phones ==
Radiolocation is also used in cellular telephony via base stations. Most often, this is done through trilateration between radio towers. The location of the Caller or handset can be determined several ways:

- angle of arrival (AOA) requires at least two towers, locating the caller at the point where the lines along the angles from each tower intersect
- time difference of arrival (TDOA) resp. time of arrival (TOA) works using multilateration, except that it is the networks that determine the time difference and therefore distance from each tower (as with seismometers)
- location signature uses "fingerprinting" to store and recall patterns (such as multipath) which mobile phone signals are known to exhibit at different locations in each cell

The first two depend on a line-of-sight, which can be difficult or impossible in mountainous terrain or around skyscrapers. Location signatures actually work better in these conditions however. TDMA and GSM networks such as Cingular and T-Mobile use TDOA.

CDMA networks such as Verizon Wireless and Sprint PCS tend to use handset-based radiolocation technologies, which are technically more similar to radionavigation. GPS is one of those technologies.

Composite solutions, needing both the handset and the network include:

- assisted GPS (Wireless or TV) allows use of GPS even indoors
- Advanced Forward Link Trilateration (A-FLT)
- Timing Advance/Network Measurement Report (TA/NMR)
- Enhanced Observed Time Difference (E-OTD)

Initially, the purpose of any of these in mobile phones is so that the public safety answering point (PSAP) which answers calls to an emergency telephone number can know where the caller is and exactly where to send emergency services. This ability is known within the NANP (North America) as wireless enhanced 911. Mobile phone users may have the option to permit the location information gathered to be sent to other phone numbers or data networks, so that it can help people who are simply lost or want other location-based services. By default, this selection is usually turned off, to protect privacy.

== International regulation ==
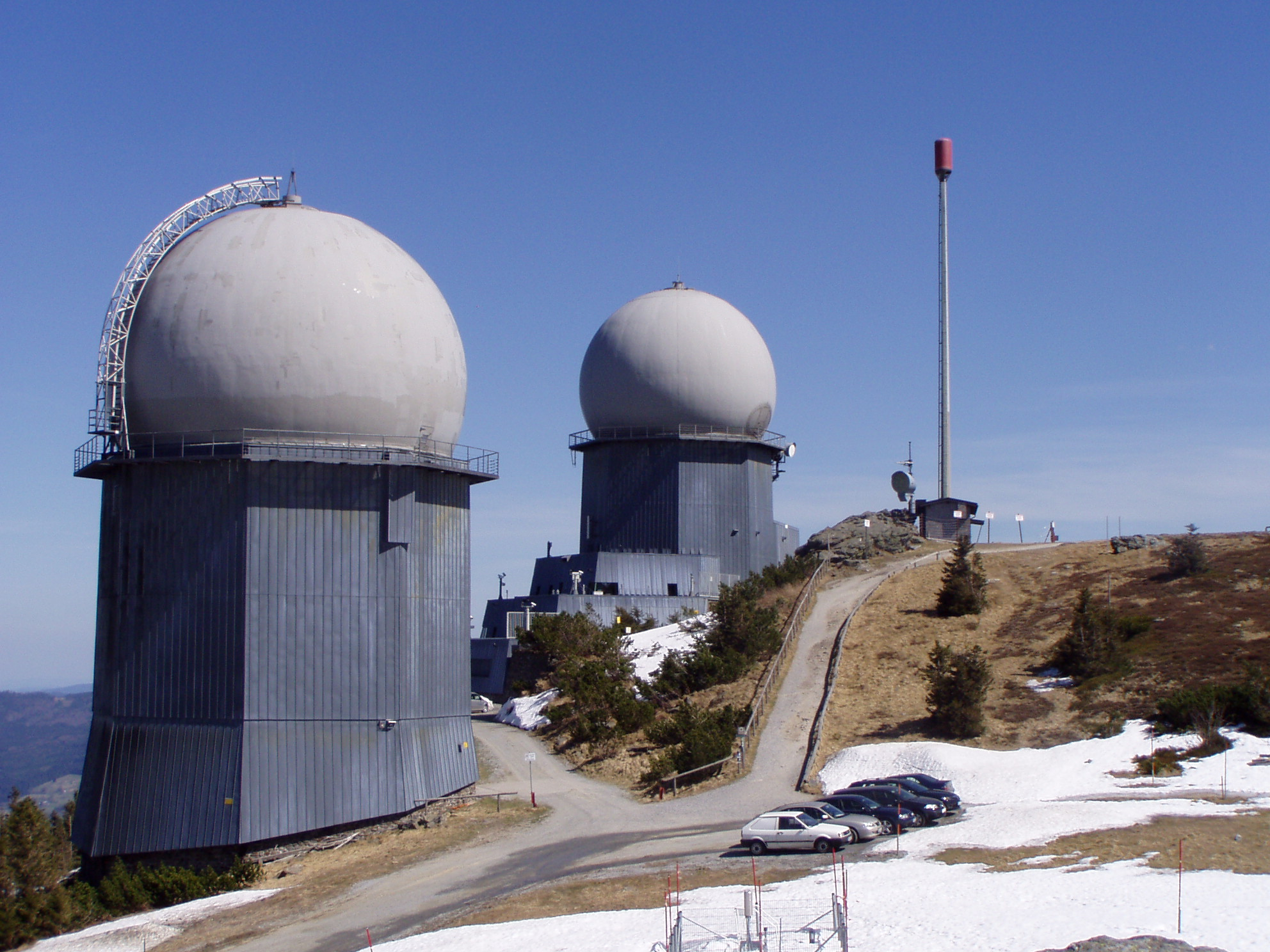
Remote Radar Post 358 (RRP 117 of the German Air Force)

Radiolocation service (short: RLS) is – according to Article 1.48 of the International Telecommunication Union's (ITU) Radio Regulations (RR) – defined as "A radiodetermination service for the purpose of radiolocation", where radiolocation is defined as: "radiodetermination used for purposes other than those of radionavigation."

=== Classification ===
This radiocommunication service is classified in accordance with ITU Radio Regulations (article 1) as follows:

- Radiodetermination service (article 1.40)
- Radiolocation service (article 1.48)
  - Radiolocation-satellite service (article 1.49)

The radiolocation service distinguishes basically

- Radiolocation mobile station land-mobile, air-mobile, sea-mobile (article 1.89)
- Radiolocation land station (article 1.90)

=== Examples ===
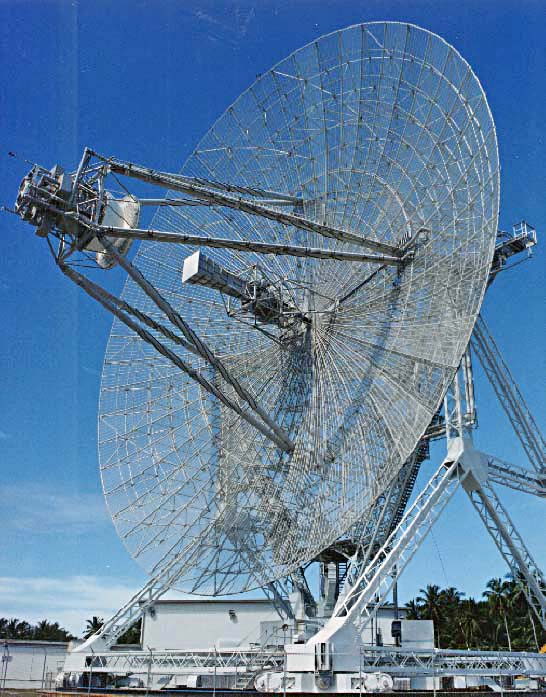
Land radar (parabolic antenna)

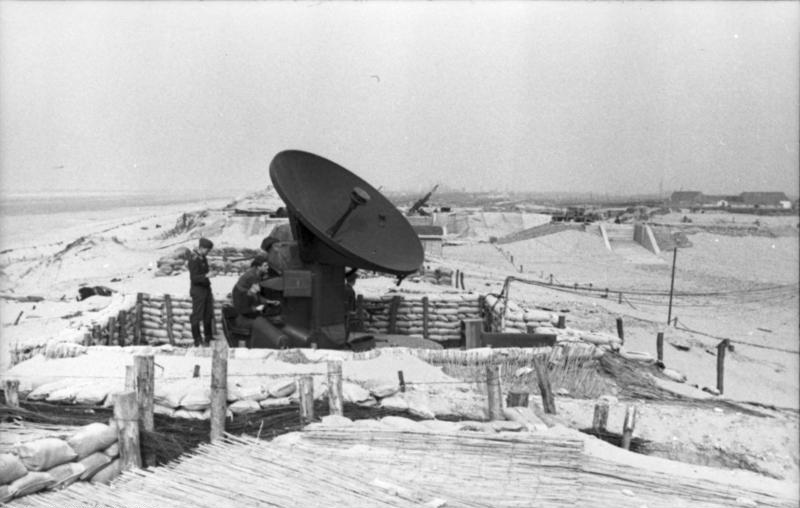
Land radar (Fire control radar FuMG 39 "Würzburg")

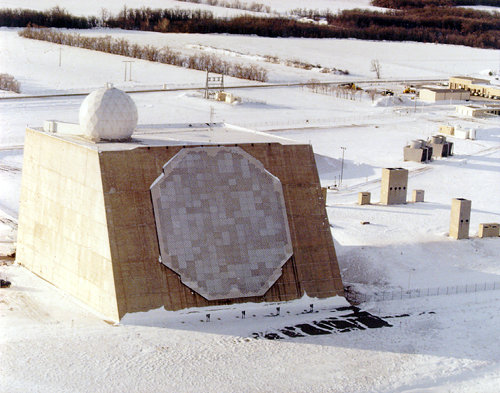
Land radar (AN/FPQ-16 early warning radar)

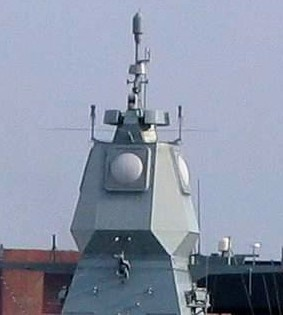
Sea-mobile radar (Active Phased Array Radar on Frigate Hamburg)

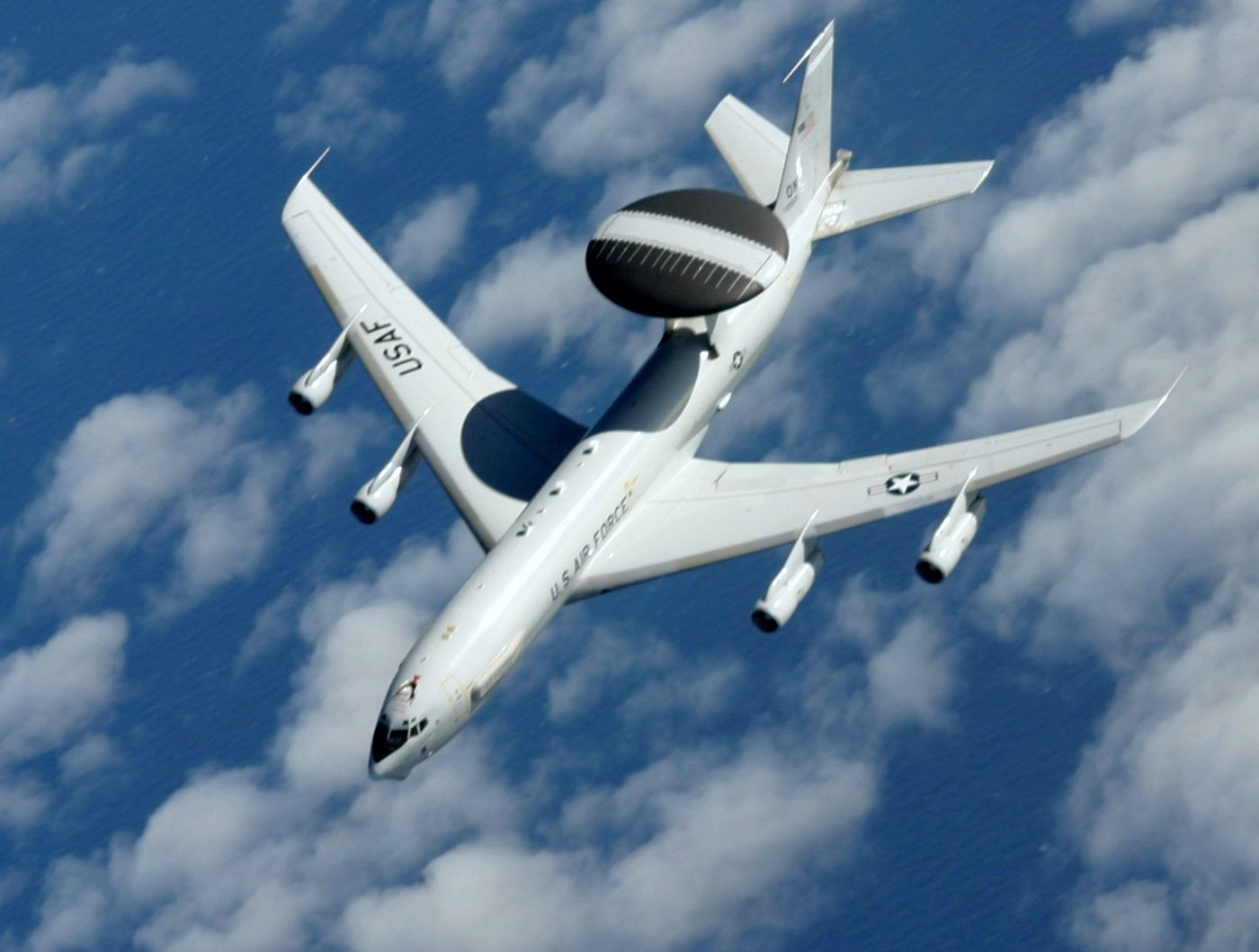
Air-mobile radar (Boeing E-3 Sentry with rotating radar dome)

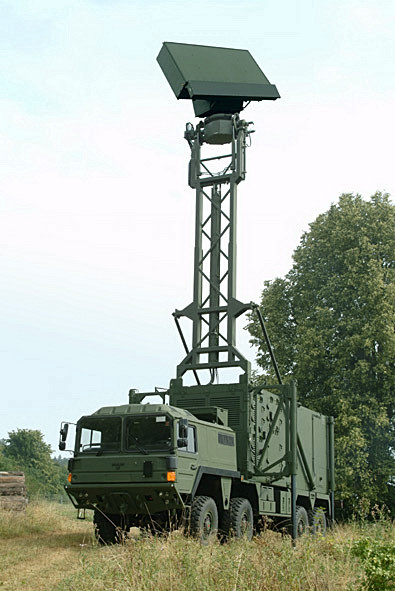
Land-mobile radar (TRML-3D Air Surveillance Radar )

== Satellites ==
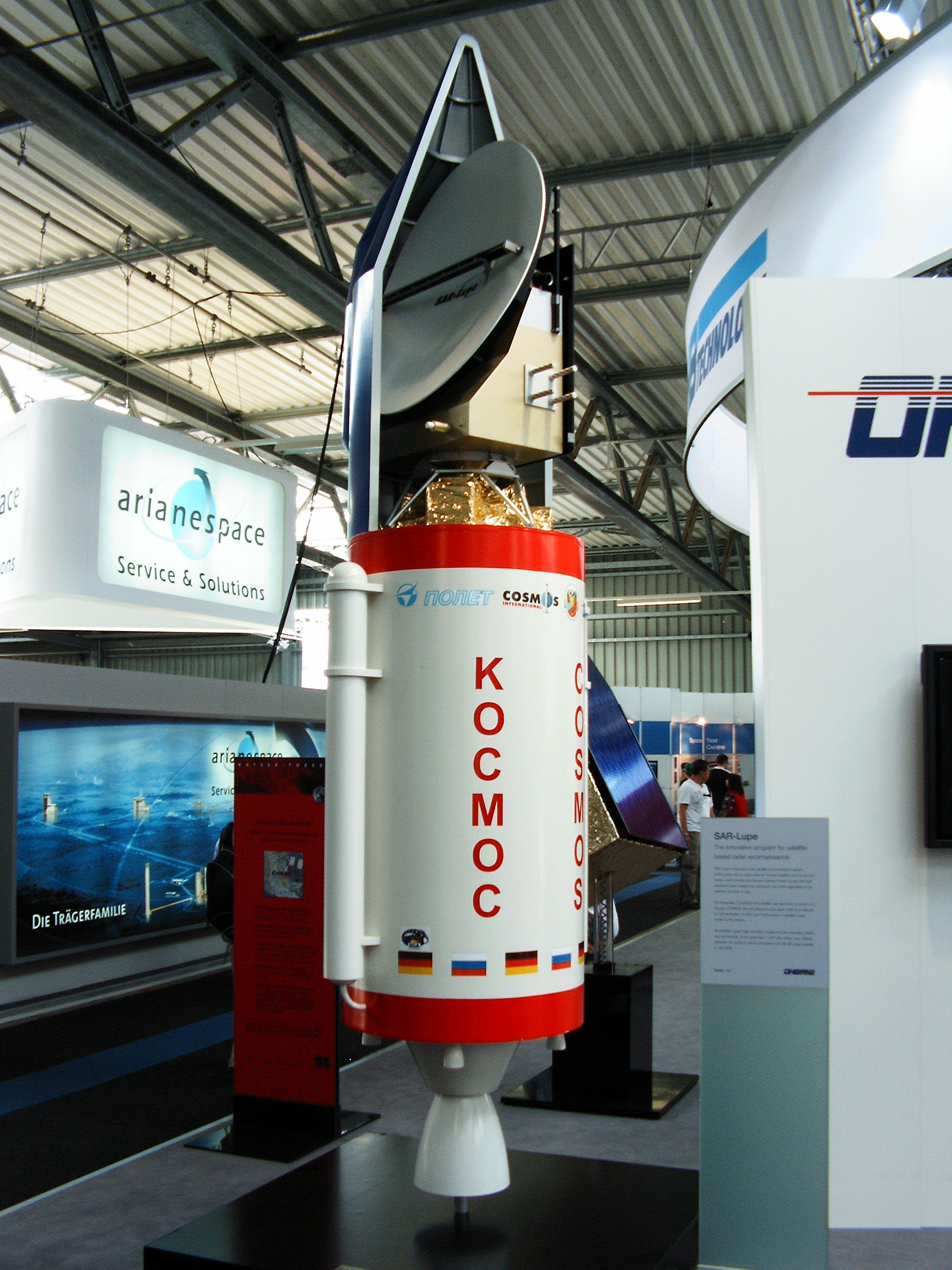
SAR-Lupe (space radio station of the radiolocation-satellite service)

Radiolocation-satellite service (short: RLSS) is – according to Article 1.49 of the International Telecommunication Union's (ITU) Radio Regulations (RR) – defined as «A radiodetermination-satellite service used for the purpose of radiolocation. This (radiocommunication) service may also include the feeder links necessary for its operation.»

The radiolocation-satellite service distinguishes basically

- Earth radio stations
- Feeder links and
- Space radio stations

For example military radar sensors in earth satellites operate in the radiolocation-satellite service n this service.

Examples of radio stations in the radiolocation-satellite service

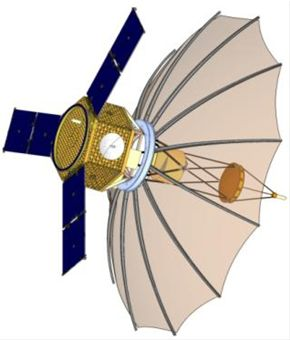
"ORS-2" space-based radar

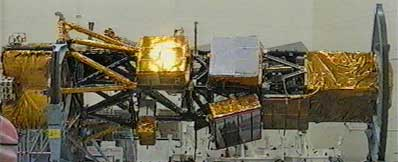
"NRO Lacrosse" radar satellite

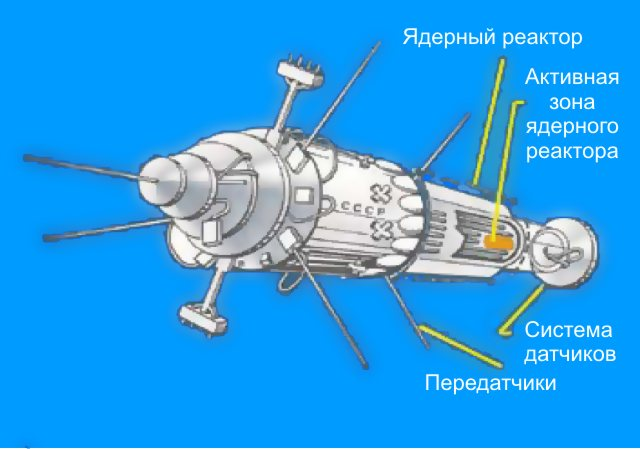
"ROSAR" radar satellite

List of radar-satellites (not complete)
Name	Country	Sensoric
Lacrosse	USA	military radar (imaging) reconnaissance satellite
SAR-Lupe	Germany	military radar (imaging) reconnaissance satellite
IGS	Japan	radar reconnaissance and optoelectronic reconnaissance
RORSAT	Russian Federation	Radar Ocean Reconnaissance SATellite

=== Frequency allocation ===
The allocation of radio frequencies is provided according to Article 5 of the ITU Radio Regulations (edition 2012).

In order to improve harmonisation in spectrum utilisation, the majority of service-allocations stipulated in this document were incorporated in national Tables of Frequency Allocations and Utilisations which is within the responsibility of the appropriate national administration. The allocation might be primary, secondary, exclusive, and shared.

Example of frequency allocation

Allocation to services
Region 1	Region 2	Region 3
24.65-24.75 GHz FIXED FIXED-SATELLITE (Earth-to-space) INTER-SATELLITE	24.65-24.75 INTER-SATELLITE RADIOLOCATION-SATELLITE (Earth-to-space)	24.65-24.75 FIXED FIXED-SATELLITE (Earth-to-space) INTER-SATELLITE MOBILE

== Stations ==
=== Land station ===
RAdio Detection And Ranging Principle

A radiolocation land station is – according to article 1.90 of the International Telecommunication Union's (ITU) ITU Radio Regulations (RR) – defined as "a radio station in radiolocation service not intended to be used while in motion." Each radiolocation station shall be classified by the radiocommunication service in which it operates permanently or temporarily.

In accordance with ITU Radio Regulations (article 1) this type of radio station might be classified as follows:

- Radiodetermination station (article 1.86) of the radiodetermination service (article 1.40 )
- Radionavigation mobile station (article 1.87) of the radionavigation service (article 1.42)
- Radionavigation land station (article 1.88) of the radionavigation service
- Radiolocation mobile station (article 1.89) of the radiolocation service (article 1.48)
- Radiolocation land station

Selection radiolocation land stations

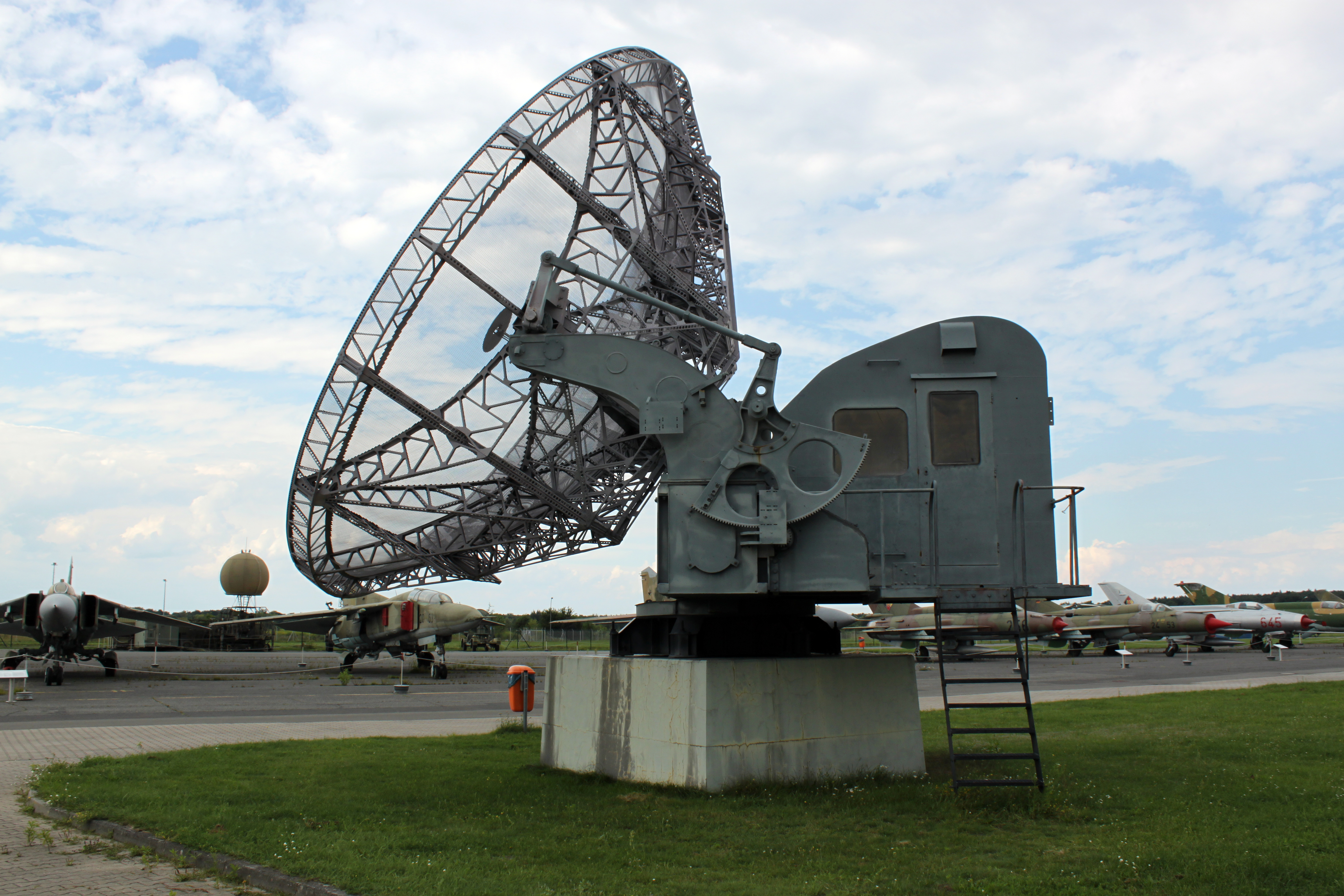
German Radar Wurzburg Riese (FuMG 65)

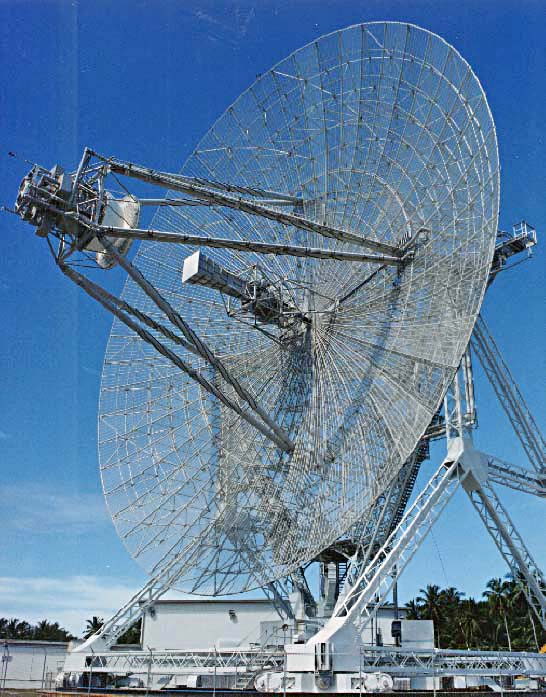
ALTAIR (ARPA Long-Range Tracking and Instrumentation Radar)

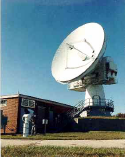
NASA Wallops Flight Facility Radar

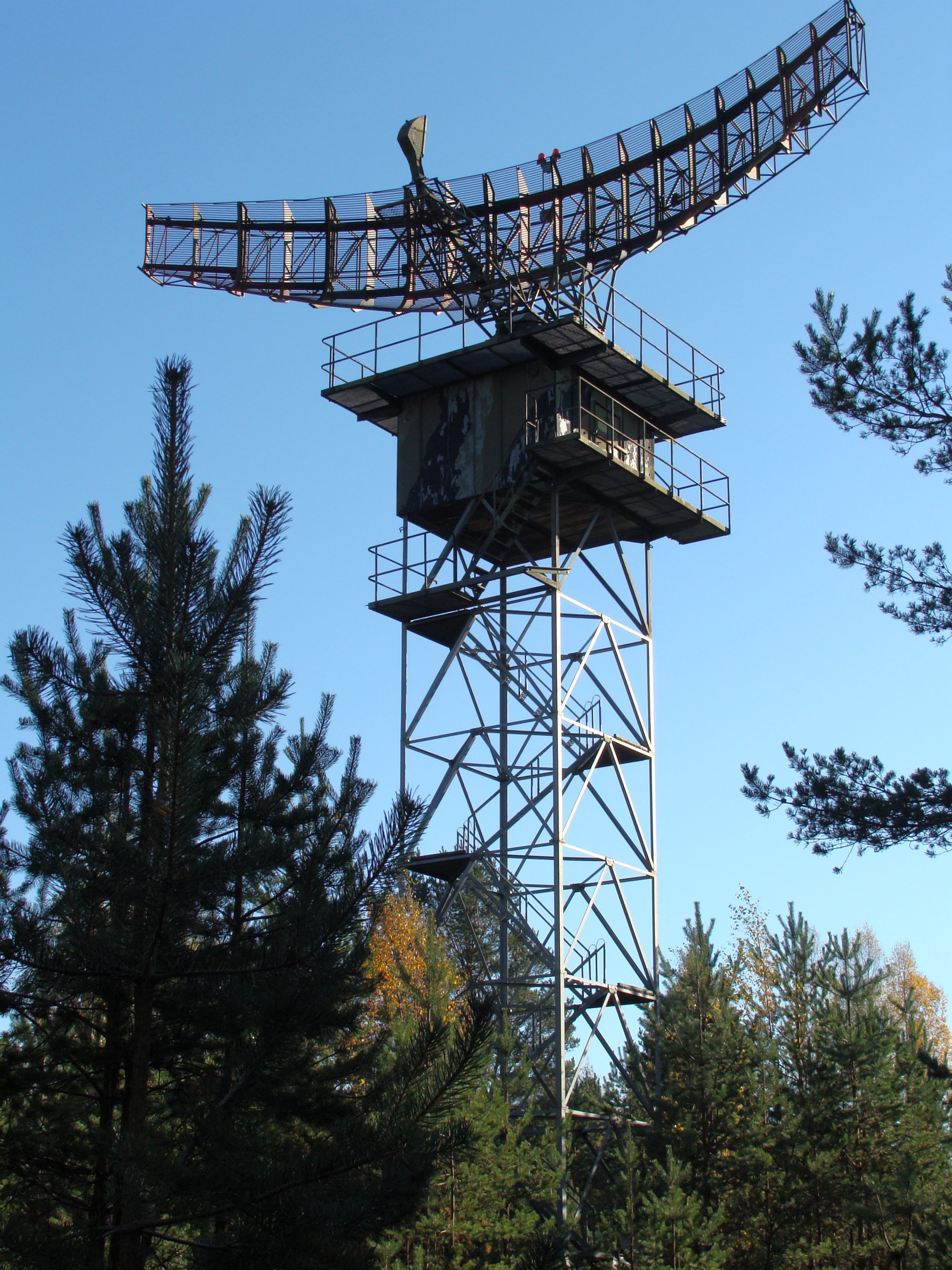
Antenna radar L band TAR Finland

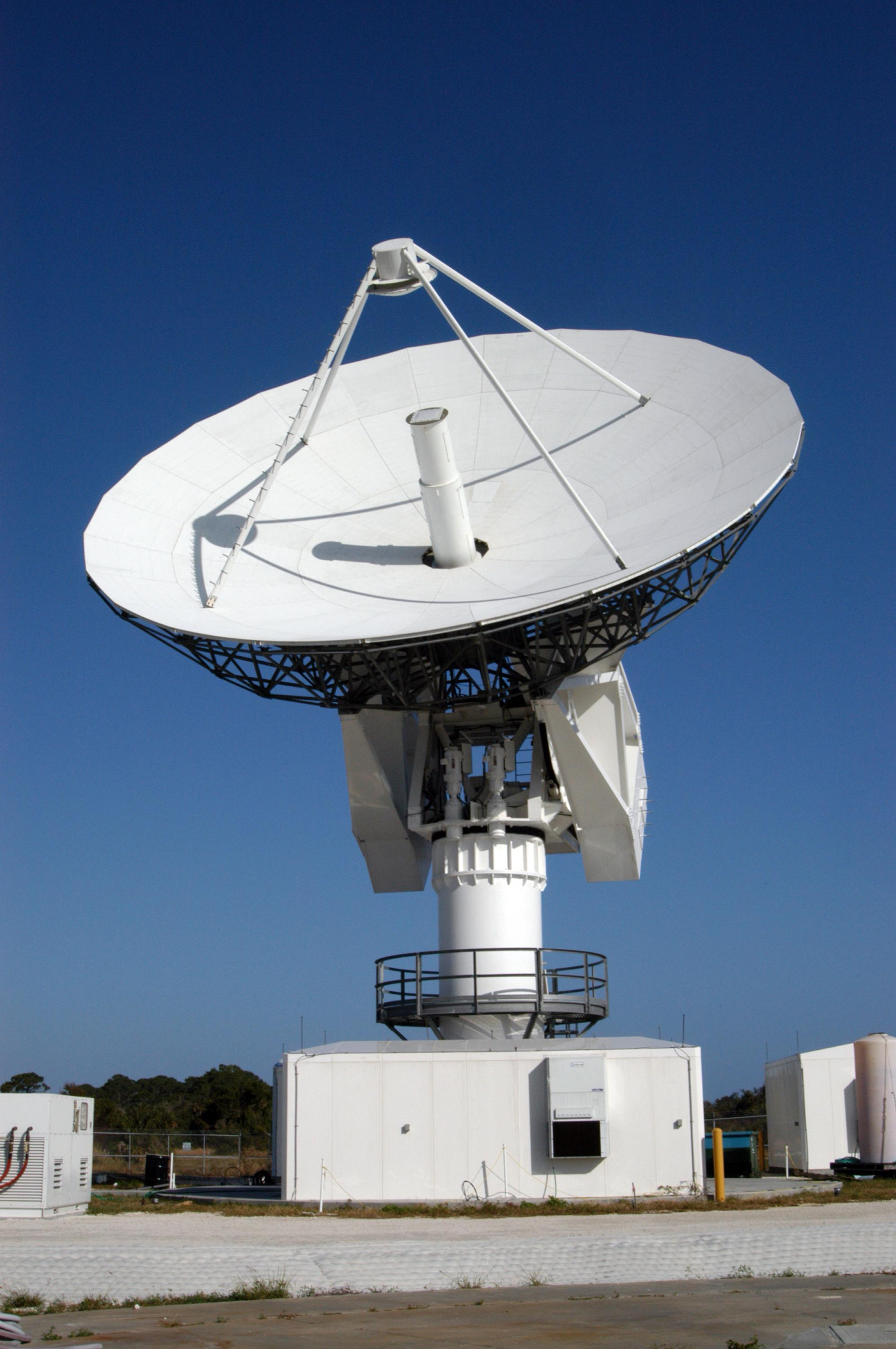
50 Feet dish Antenna of a 3 kW C band Radar

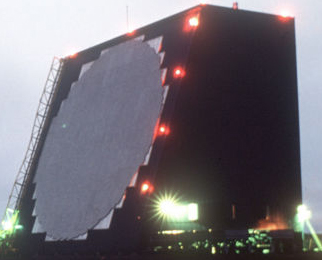
Intelligence-gathering phased array radar FPS-108 COBRA DANE

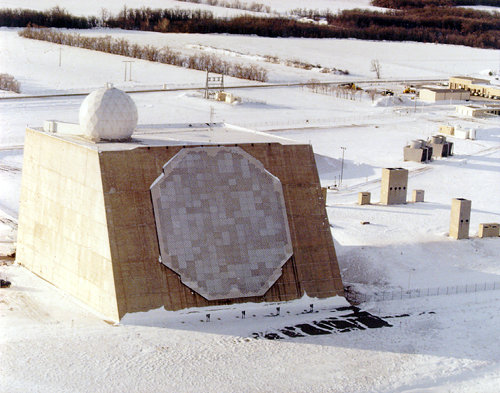
Phased array radar AN/FPQ-16 PARCS

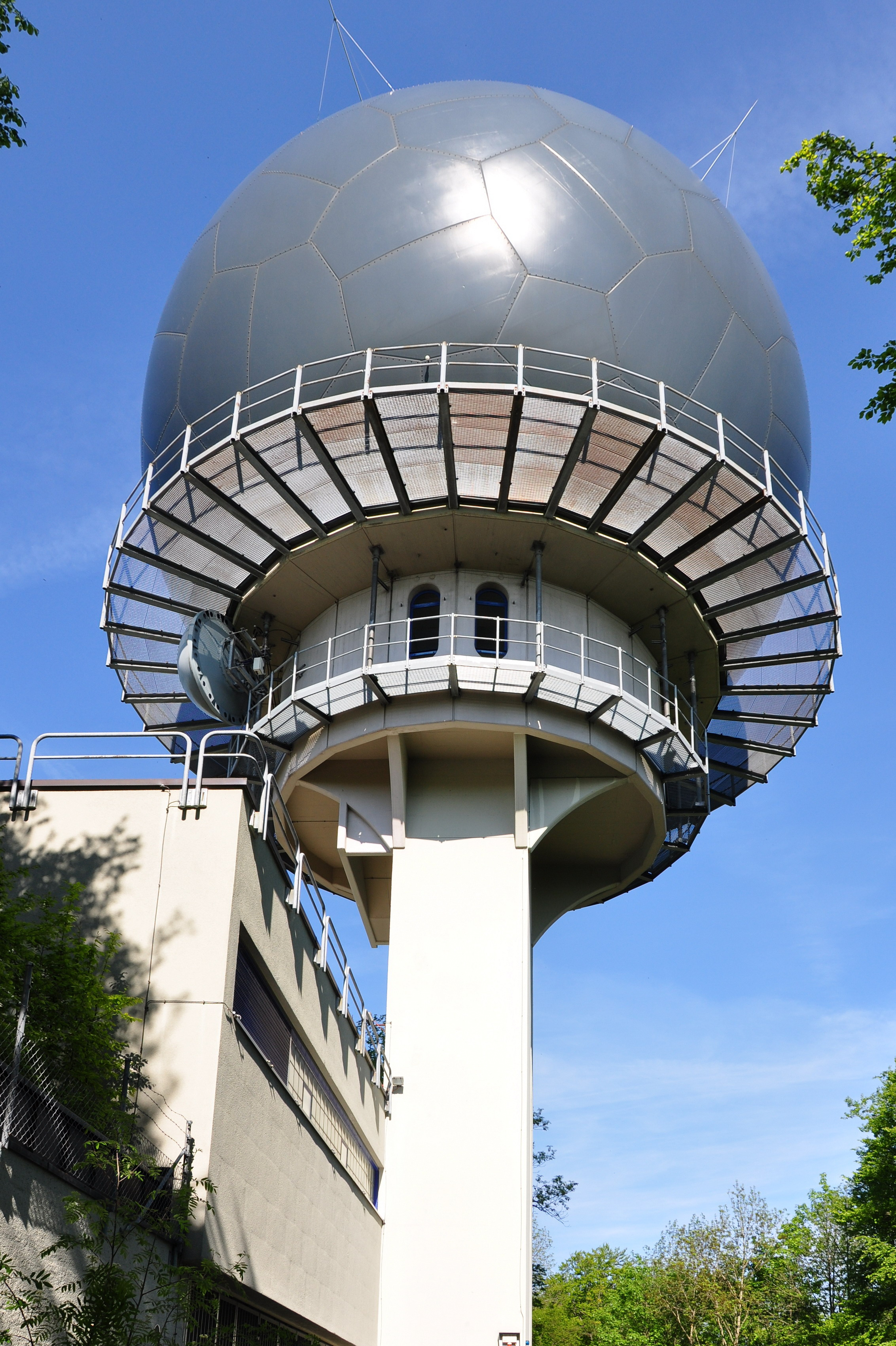
Skyguide radar, Hochwacht in Boppelsen on Lägern (Switzerland)

=== Mobile station ===
Radiolocation mobile station is – according to article 1.89 of the International Telecommunication Union's (ITU) ITU Radio Regulations (RR) – defined as "A radio station in radiolocation service intended to be used while in motion or during halts at unspecified points." Each radiolocation station shall be classified by the radiocommunication service in which it operates permanently or temporarily.

In accordance with ITU Radio Regulations (article 1) this type of radio station might be classified as follows: Radiodetermination station (article 1.86) of the radiodetermination service (article 1.40)

- Radionavigation mobile station (article 1.87) of the radionavigation service (article 1.42)
- Radionavigation land station (article 1.88) of the radionavigation service
- Radiolocation mobile station

Selection radiolocation mobile stations

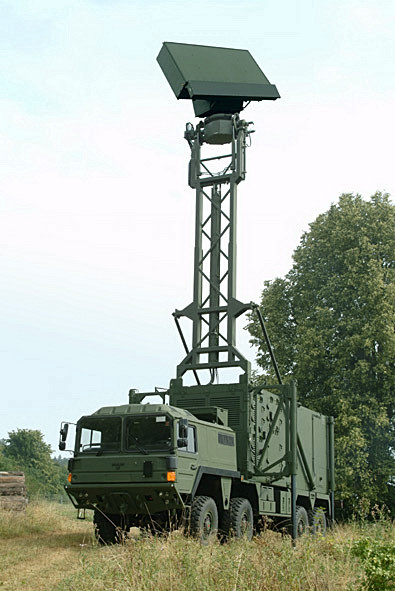
Air Surveillance Radars TRML-3D

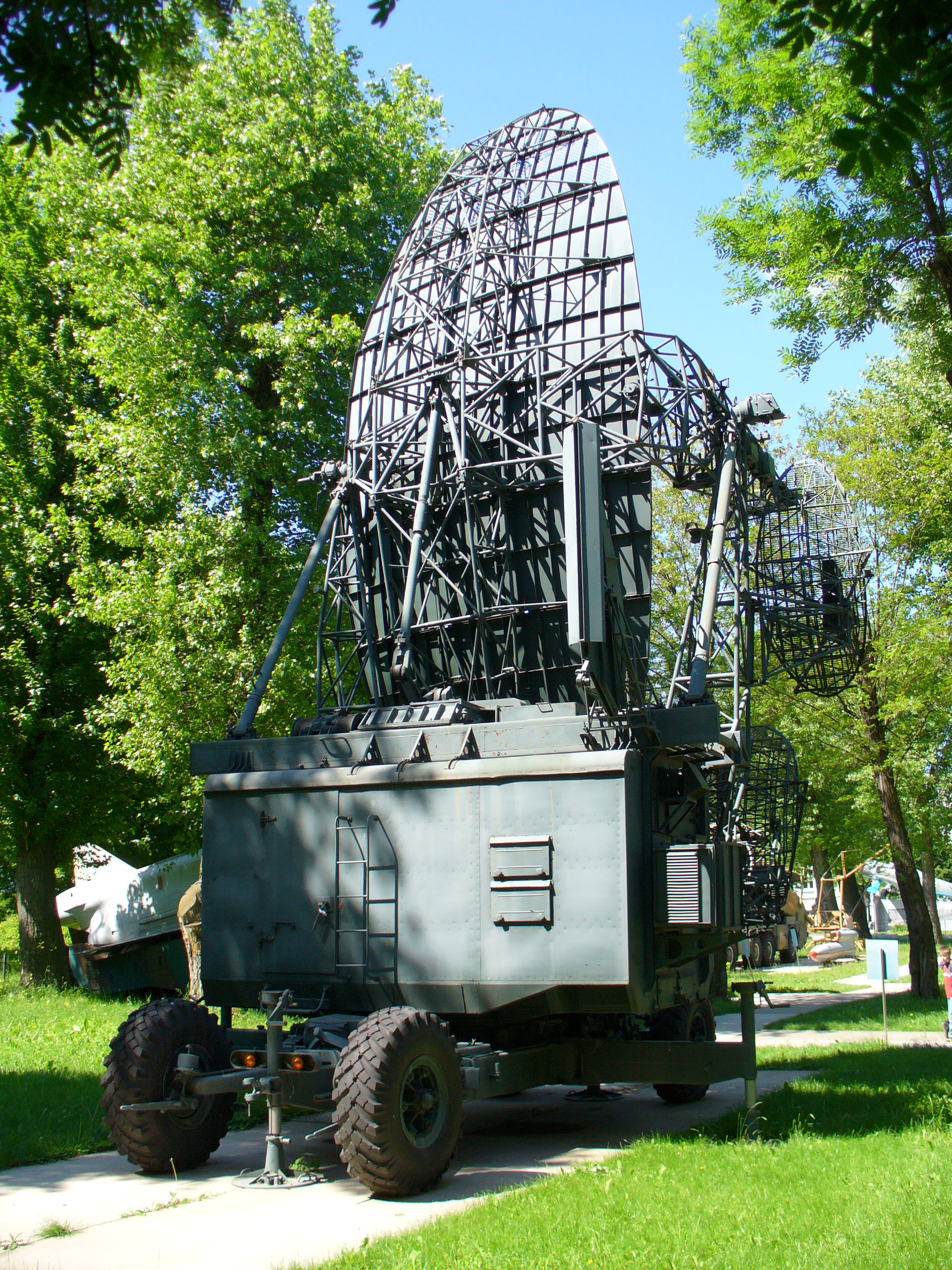
High finder radar

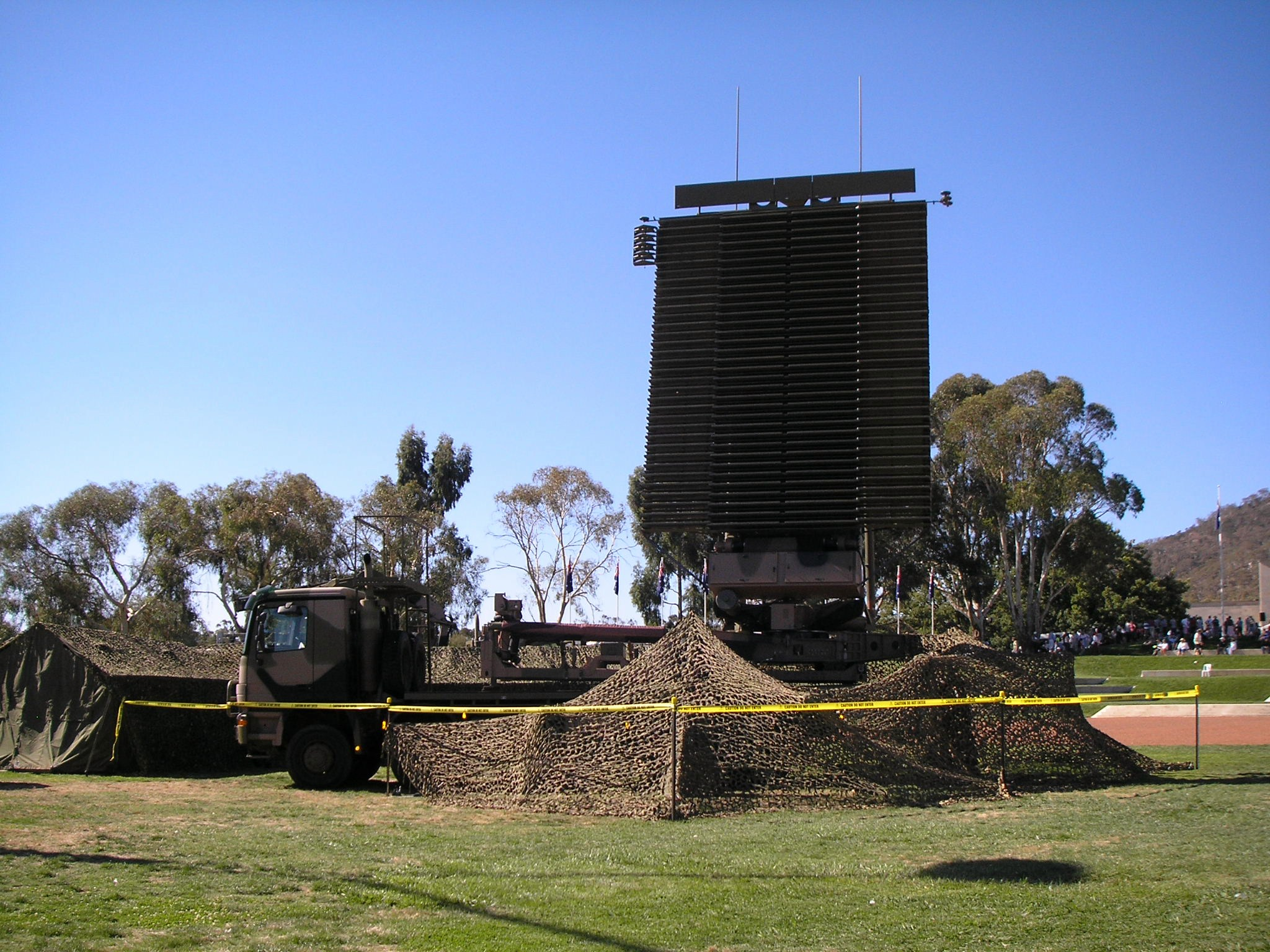
RAAF radar, AN/TPS-77

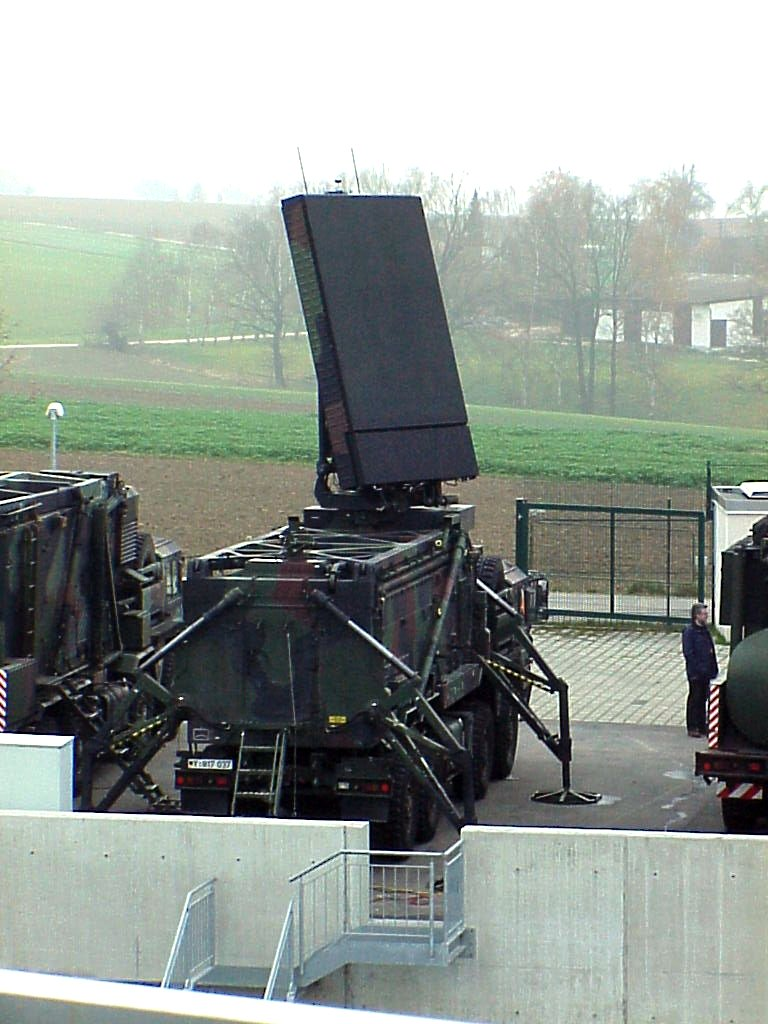
German radar sensor LÜR

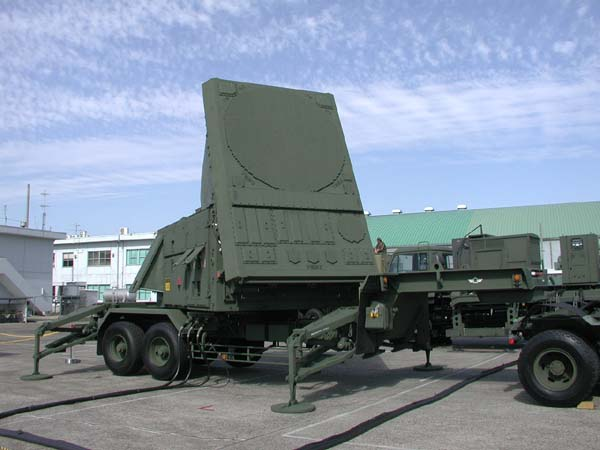
MIM-104 Patriot in Japanese service

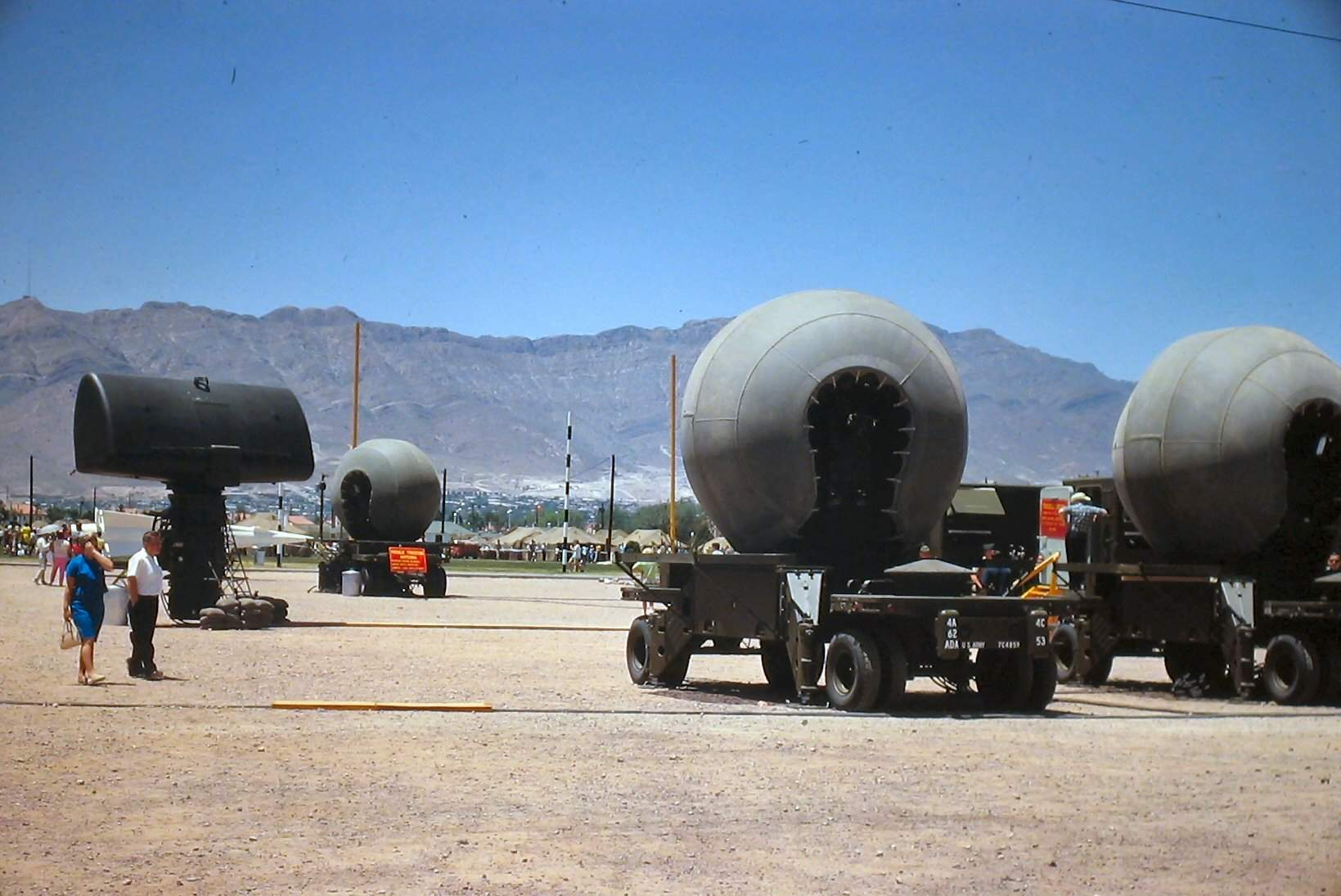
Nike Hercules IFC radars LOPAR and the tracking radars (MTR, TTR, TRR) f.l.t.r.

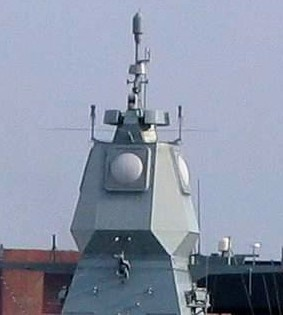
APAR-radar Fregatte Hamburg (F 220)

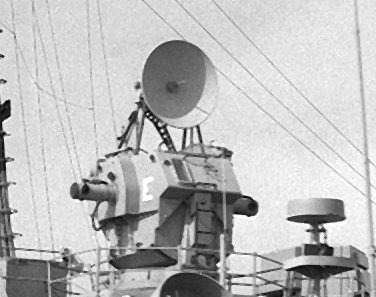
Weapon control radar

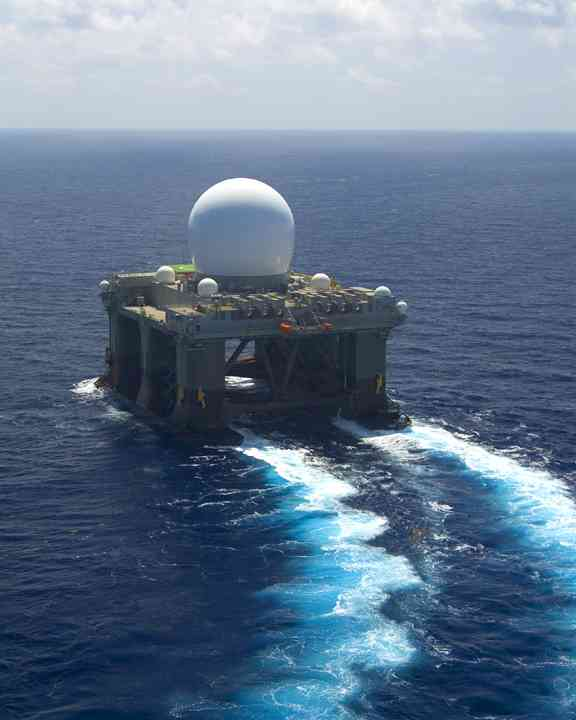
Sea-based x-band radar underway

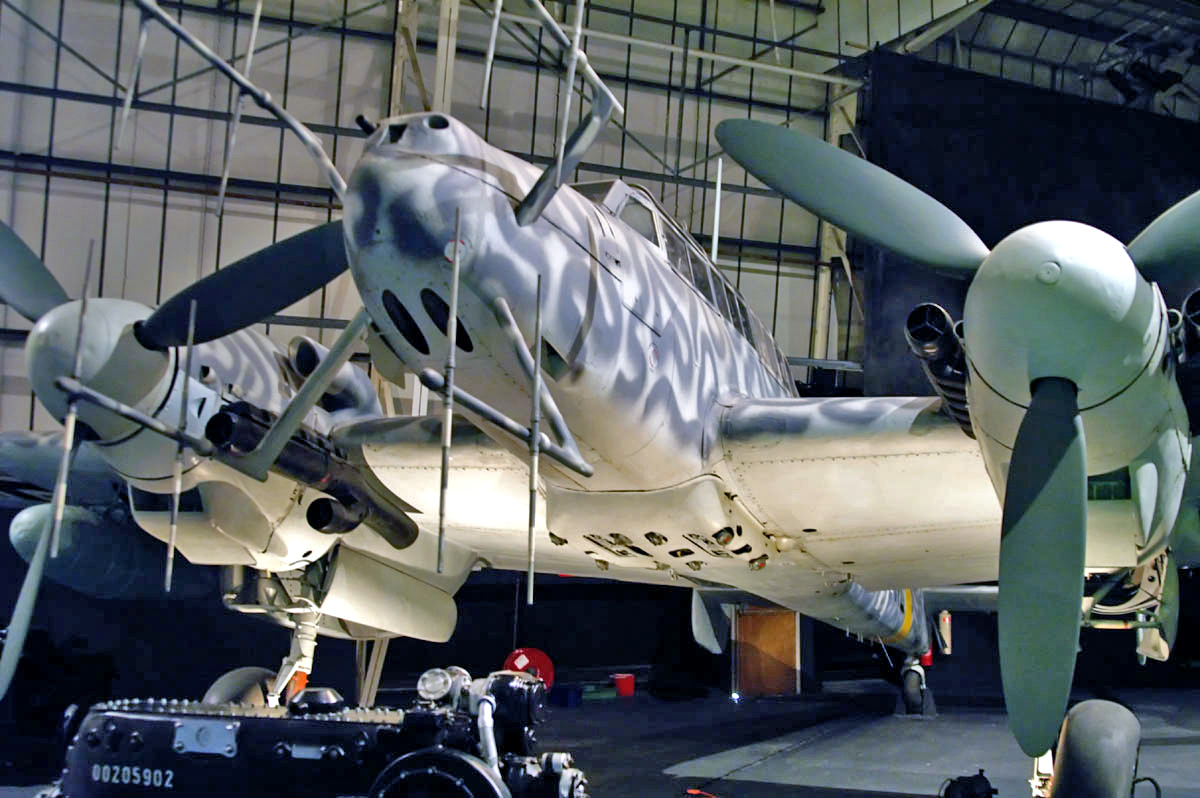
Air borne radar "Lichtenstein SN-2" in the ME Bf 110G

== See also ==
- Radio direction finding
- Real time locating
- Lightning detection
