= John Varvatos =

American fashion designer (born 1954)

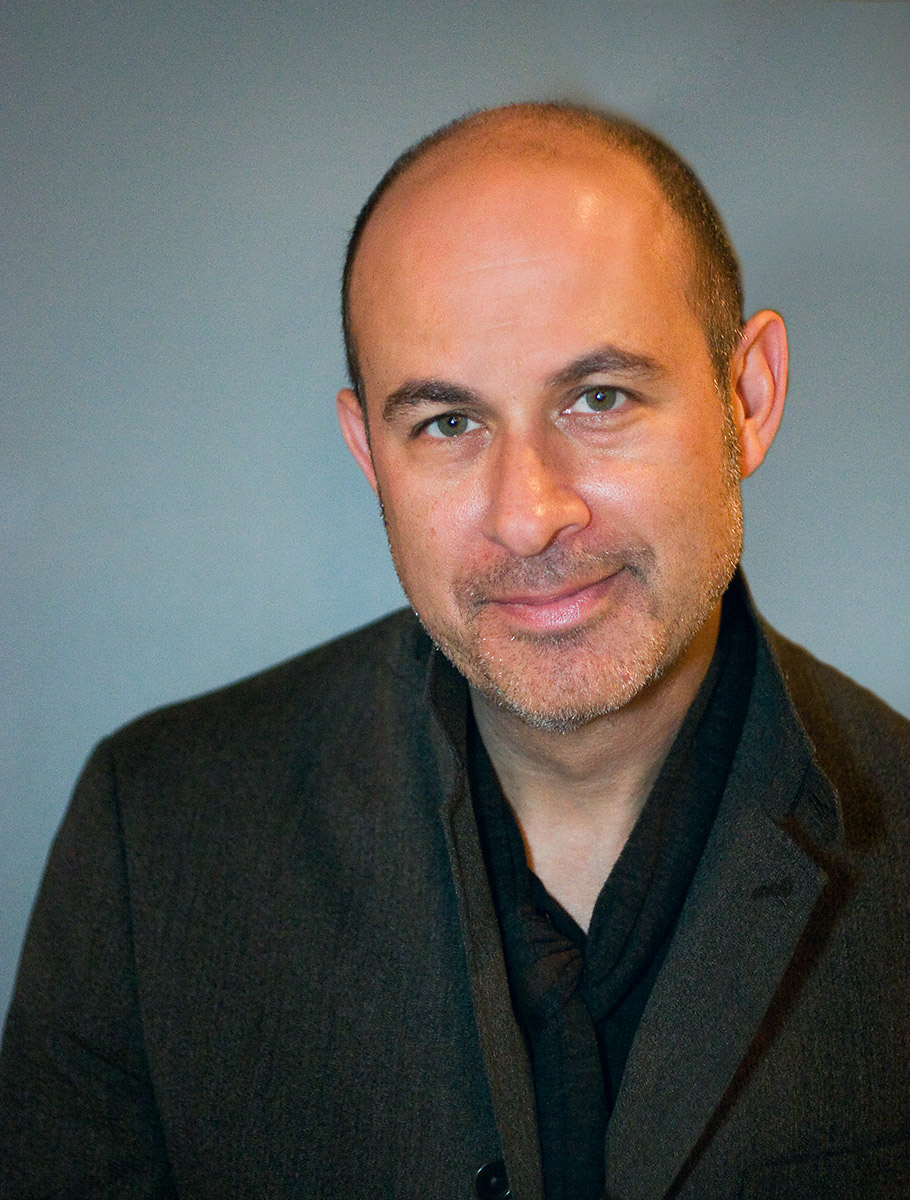
- John Varvatos (2006)
- Born: August 8, 1954 (age 72); Detroit, Michigan, US
- Education: Eastern Michigan University
- Labels: John Varvatos; John Varvatos Records
- Awards: Perry Ellis Award for Menswear, 2000; CFDA: Menswear Designer of the Year, 2001 and 2005; GQ: Designer of the Year, 2007

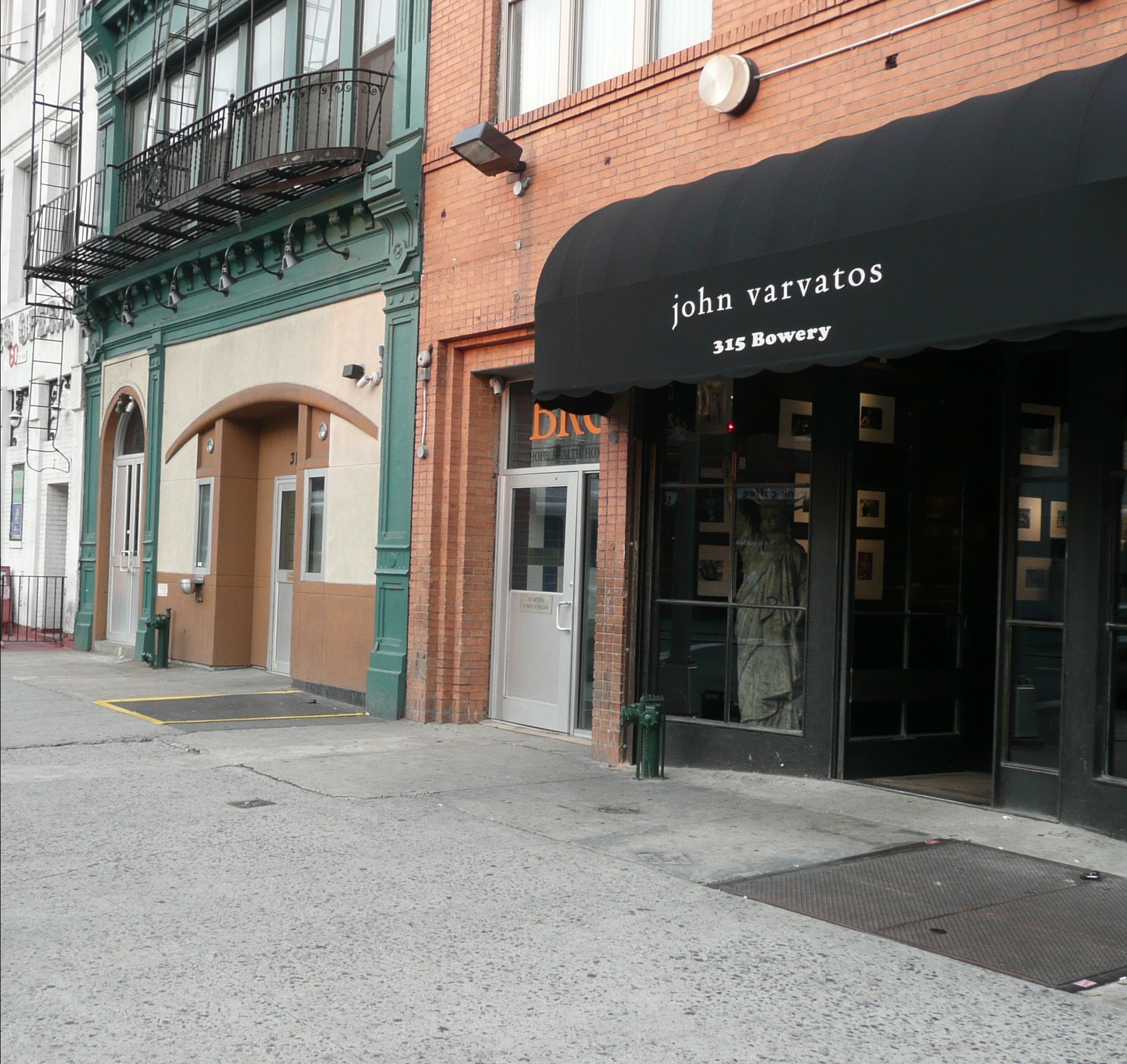
Store at 315 Bowery, New York

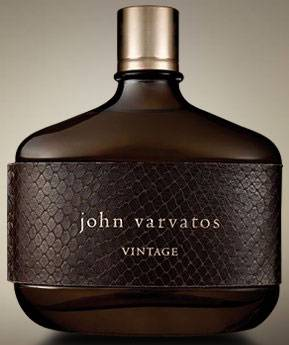
Bottle of John Varvatos VINTAGE

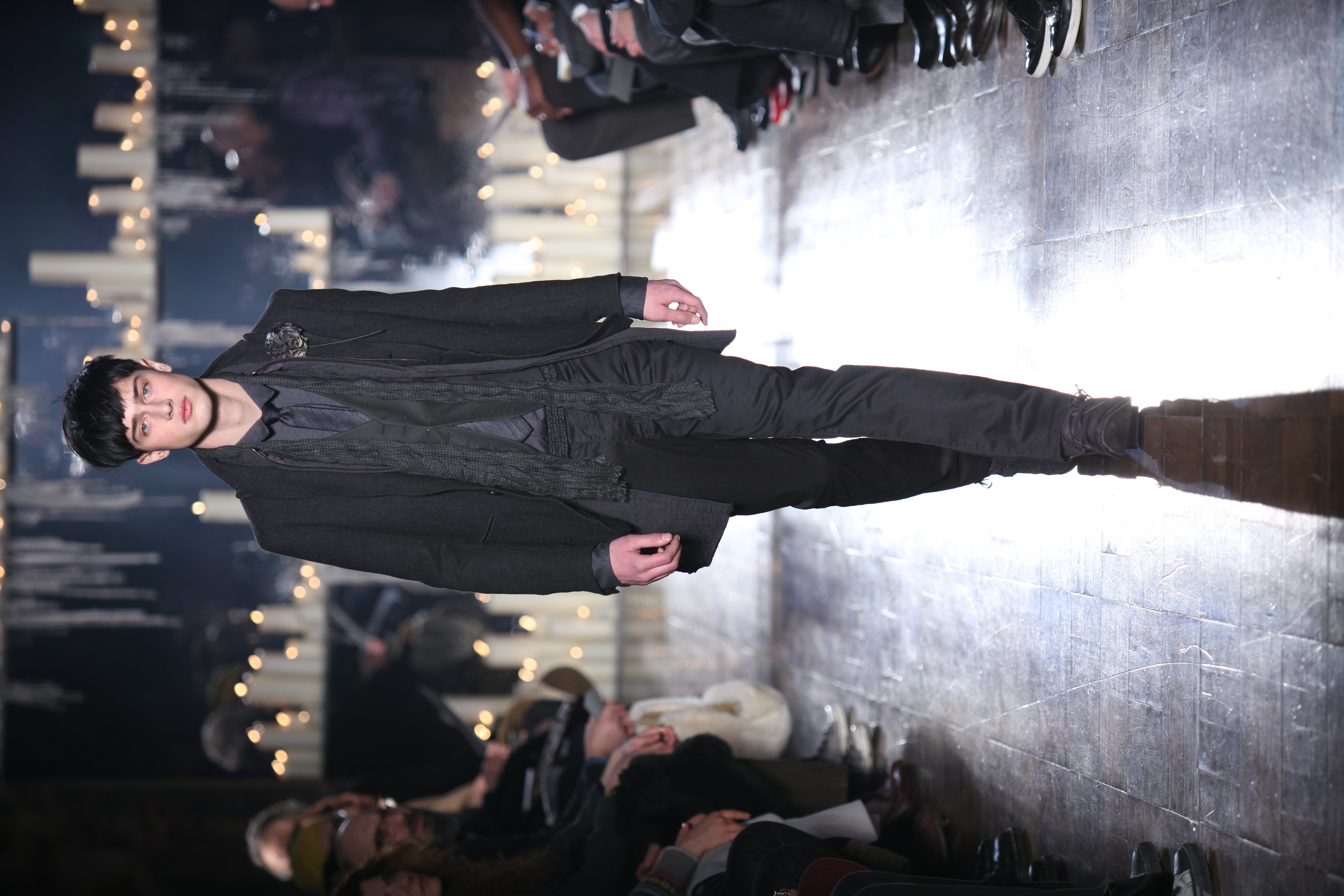
Model wearing items from the John Varvatos Collection of Fall/Winter 2010/11

John Varvatos (born 1954) is an American menswear designer. He has worked for both Ralph Lauren and Calvin Klein, and started his own label in 1999.

== Early life ==
The Varvatos family is originally from the village of Poulata on the island of Kefalonia, Greece. Varvatos was born in Detroit and grew up in Allen Park, Michigan.

He attended Allen Park High School. At the age of 16, he got a job selling menswear at the Hughes & Hatcher store in nearby Dearborn.

He attended Eastern Michigan University and the University of Michigan.

== Early career ==
After graduating in 1980, he co-founded a menswear store, Fitzgerald's Men's Store, in Grand Rapids, Michigan.

Varvatos joined Polo Ralph Lauren in 1983. He then moved on to Calvin Klein in 1990 where he was appointed head of menswear design and oversaw the launch of the men's collection and the cK brand. During his time at Calvin Klein, Varvatos pioneered a type of men's undergarment called boxer briefs, a hybrid of boxer shorts and briefs. Made famous by a series of 1992 print ads featuring Mark Wahlberg, they have been called "one of the greatest apparel revolutions of the century." Of their creation Varvatos said in 2010, "We just cut off a pair of long johns and thought, this could be cool ...".

In 1995, Varvatos returned to Ralph Lauren as head of menswear design for all Polo Ralph Lauren brands and created the Polo Jeans Company.

== Career ==
In late 1999, Varvatos started his company, debuting his first clothing line at the end of 2000 in New York. The brand now includes belts, handbags, footwear, eyewear, watches and fragrances.

In September 2000, within months of showing his first collection, Varvatos opened a freestanding boutique in SoHo. The collection is currently distributed in John Varvatos boutiques including the 315 Bowery boutique in the space that formerly housed the underground music club CBGB.

2009 saw the launch of New York Nights…Direct From the Bowery, a monthly radio show hosted by Varvatos on SiriusXM's The Spectrum channel. The show includes songs and interviews from various artists who have influenced Varvatos throughout his career in fashion.

In 2012, Varvatos joined the cast of celebrity mentors on NBC's Fashion Star, a reality competition series that searched for the next big brand in fashion. In 2013, he saw the release of a limited edition Chrysler 300 in his name. In 2014, he partnered with Monte Lipman's Republic label to launch John Varvatos Records, initially signing the Zac Brown Band.

Varvatos credits his early obsession with rock 'n' roll as the catalyst for his interest in fashion. The ad campaigns for the main collection, shot by Danny Clinch, have featured musicians and bands such as Iggy Pop, Alice Cooper, Velvet Revolver, Chris Cornell, Dave Matthews, The Roots, and Green Day.

The John Varvatos company filed for Chapter 11 bankruptcy in May 2020. In 2021 Varvatos founded OTD.

In September 2023, Varvatos was appointed Chief Design Officer of Under Armour, a publicly traded US performance apparel company founded by Kevin Plank.

== Partnership with Converse ==
In 2001, Varvatos and Converse formed a partnership and Varvatos was licensed to create a line of high end sneakers, John Varvatos' sneakers were usually produced in the style of High Top Chuck Taylor All-Stars. The partnership has since ended, and Varvatos now produces a "Bootleg" line in a similar Chuck Taylor style.
