= Bolongaro Trevor =

Fashion brand

Bolongaro Trevor is a fashion brand from Kait Bolongaro and Stuart Trevor, original founders and former designers behind retail group AllSaints. They sold the business to investors in 2016 and now have no association with the brand

Bolongaro Trevor was launched by the couple in 2006, after they sold their shares in AllSaints.

The brand takes design inspiration from Victorian London, as well as vintage military wear.

Stuart Trevor attended Nottingham Trent University and graduated in 1988 with a BA in fashion design. Following university he served as head of menswear at Reiss for seven years. before he went on to found AllSaints in 1994. Kait Bolongaro studied at Ravensbourne College of Design and Communication and graduated in 1990, she then subsequently earned an MA in Fashion Design from the Royal College of Art in 1992, following this, she joined Trevor at AllSaints in 1996.

The brand is known for its celebrity following with the likes of Daisy Lowe, Gwen Stefani, Courtney Love, Liam Gallagher, Leighton Meester, Helena Bonham Carter, The Who and The Libertines wearing it. The company has previously shown at London Fashion Week in 2010, as well as frequenting the French trade show Tranoï.

In 2014, father and son Muhammad Arshad Jalil and Omar Jalil bought 50% of Bolongaro Trevor. Stuart Trevor and his wife, Kait Bolongaro, sold the remaining 50% to the Jalil family in 2016. Kait Bolongaro and Stuart Trevor are no longer involved with the brand.

The business has achieved a year on year growth of over 66 percent since 2016 and is presently being sold in Europe and US with plans to launch in Middle East.

In 2023, Stuart Trevor launched a new vintage clothing brand under his own name.
