= The Mangrove =

Former Caribbean restaurant in Notting Hill, London

Mangrove
- Location within Greater London

Restaurant information
- Established: 1968
- Closed: 1992
- Owner: The Rum Kitchen
- Previous owner: Frank Crichlow
- Food type: Caribbean
- Location: 8 All Saints Road, Notting Hill, Royal Borough of Kensington and Chelsea, Greater London, United Kingdom
- Coordinates: 51°31′3″N 0°12′12″W

The Mangrove was a Caribbean restaurant in Notting Hill, London, England. It was founded in 1968 and run by civil rights activist Frank Crichlow, eventually closing in 1992. It is known for the trial of a group of British black activists dubbed "the Mangrove Nine", who were tried for inciting a riot at a 1970 protest against the police targeting the restaurant.

== History ==
The restaurant was opened in 1968 by Trinidadian community activist and civil rights campaigner Frank Crichlow. It was located at 8 All Saints Road, Notting Hill, in West London. Like the El Rio before it – a coffee bar run by Crichlow at 127 Westbourne Park Road in the early 1960s that attracted attention in the Profumo affair – the Mangrove was a meeting place for the Black community in the area, as well as for white radicals, artists, authors, and musicians. Famous customers included Jimi Hendrix, Nina Simone, Bob Marley, C. L. R. James, Lionel Morrison, Norman Beaton, Vanessa Redgrave, Colin MacInnes, Richard Neville and Tony Gifford.

A small newspaper, The Hustler, was published on the premises, underlining the community aspect of the restaurant, which also served as an informal head office for the Notting Hill Carnival.

=== The Mangrove Nine ===
In 1969 the Mangrove restaurant became the target of police attention that seemed designed to close it down. It was raided 12 times between January 1969 and July 1970, and in August that year a protest march was organised, demanding that police stop targeting the Mangrove. The protest ended in violence and the arrests of nine protesters (the "Mangrove Nine"), including Crichlow, Altheia Jones-LeCointe and Darcus Howe, on charges that included conspiracy to incite a riot. Their 1971 trial – which featured an unsuccessful demand by Howe for an all-Black jury – ended with the acquittal of all nine on the incitement charges, and five of the nine, including Crichlow and Howe, on all charges. The trial of the Mangrove Nine drew public attention to police racism, and turned the fight against it into a cause célèbre.

=== Closure ===
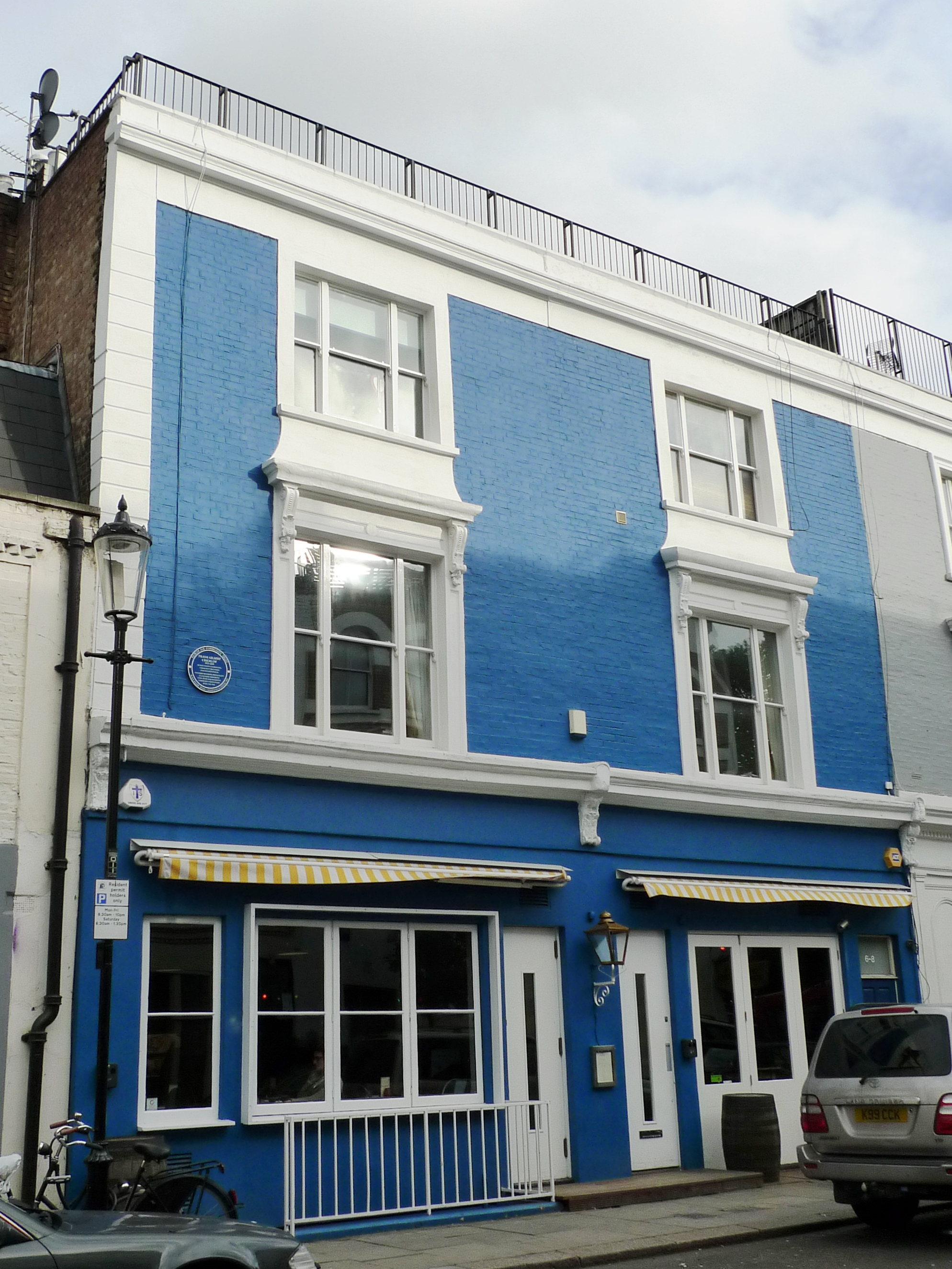
8 All Saints Road in 2013, with a blue plaque commemorating Frank Crichlow's foundation of The Mangrove at the address

Rapid gentrification of the restaurant's neighbourhood in the 1980s once more led to increased police pressure. The restaurant was raided twice in 1988, once by 48 police officers in riot gear, and Crichlow was charged with supplying heroin and cannabis, despite being known locally for his strong anti-drug stance. Held in custody for five weeks before being granted bail on conditions that prohibited him from going near the restaurant for a year, Crichlow alleged that the police themselves had planted the drugs. He was acquitted of all charges after the year was over, and in 1992 the Metropolitan Police paid him damages of £50,000 for false imprisonment, battery and malicious prosecution. But both his year-long absence and changes in economic conditions had caused the restaurant to fail. By 1992, it was closed, and the premises boarded up.

== Commemoration ==
The Little Yellow Door, a late-night cocktail bar and restaurant, now operates from the Mangrove's former address, outside which a blue plaque to honour Crichlow was unveiled on 4 December 2011 by the Nubian Jak Community Trust.

== In film ==
A documentary film, The Mangrove Nine (directed and co-produced by Franco Rosso, John La Rose co-produced and scripted it, and Horace Ové was an associate producer), was made in 1973, and includes interviews with the defendants recorded before the final verdicts.

A 2020 BBC drama Mangrove, part of the Small Axe miniseries, is directed by Bafta- and Oscar-winning director Steve McQueen.

== See also ==
- List of restaurants in London
- British Black Panthers
