= OTD (company) =

American fashion brand

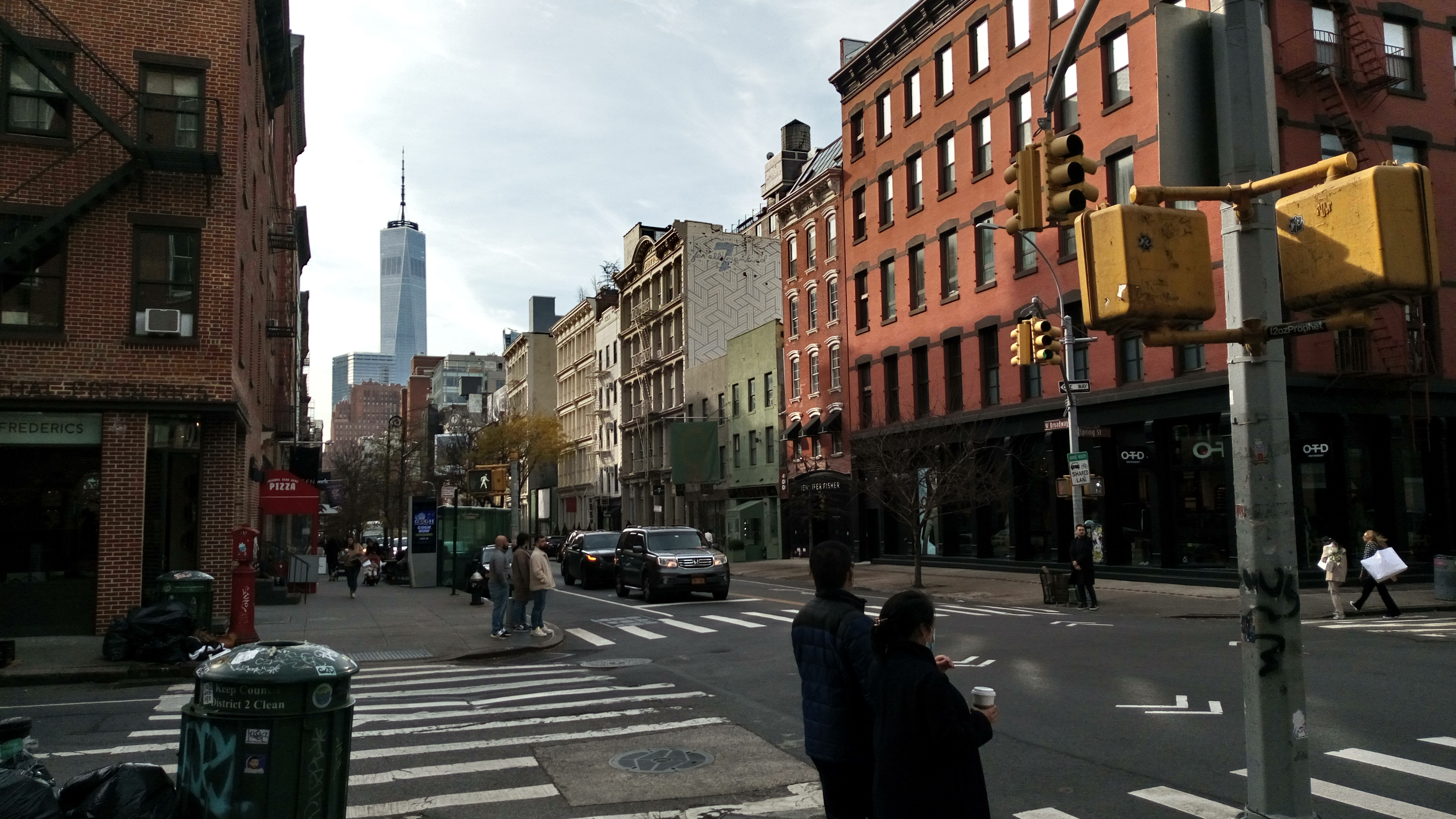
- Company type: Private
- Industry: Fashion
- Founded: 2021; 5 years ago
- Founder: John Varvatos
- Defunct: 2023
- Headquarters: New York City
- Website: otdnyc.com

OTD (abbr. "on this day") was an American brand founded by designer John Varvatos after he exited his namesake brand in 2020. OTD had the flagship store located in the heart of New York City's SoHo neighborhood, while founding a second home in Los Angeles on West Hollywood's iconic Sunset Strip. OTD planned to be more tied to pop culture, wanted to offer elevated and reimagined silhouettes for men and women and to be more relaxed lifestyle brand. OTD shuttered in 2023.
