= Stuart Trevor =

Scottish fashion designer

Stuart Trevor (born 29 November 1966) is a Scottish-born fashion designer. He graduated from Nottingham Trent University in 1988. Stuart worked as the first ever head of menswear design and buying at UK brand Reiss, he produced the first ever REISS collection, and sold it to all the best department stores in the world. In 1994 founded AllSaints the brand name was a pseudonym for Stuart Trevor, inspired by Simon Templar, a fictional character played by Roger Moore in 1960s TV series The Saint - Trevor bought the same car driven by the actor in the TV series when he was 20 years old, drove it around London and was nicknamed “The Saint” Volvo P1800. Stuart Trevor sold ALL SAINTS December 2006 and in 2007 launched his next brand, Bolongaro Trevor, with ex partner Kait Bolongaro. Trevor sold the company in 2016.

After 5 years mentoring start up brands with a positive social and environmental impact, Trevor launched his latest brand STUART TREVOR in 2023 to incredible acclaim. A sustainable brand founded on the question “What about a clothing brand that doesn’t produce any clothing” Their mission is to make buying sustainable products easier and more fun, to create non destructive clothing from other peoples waste - “Stuart Trevor sets out to create the worlds most sustainable brand.”
