= All Saints Road (London) =

Street in London's Notting Hill district

Coordinates: 51.51841°N 0.20409°W

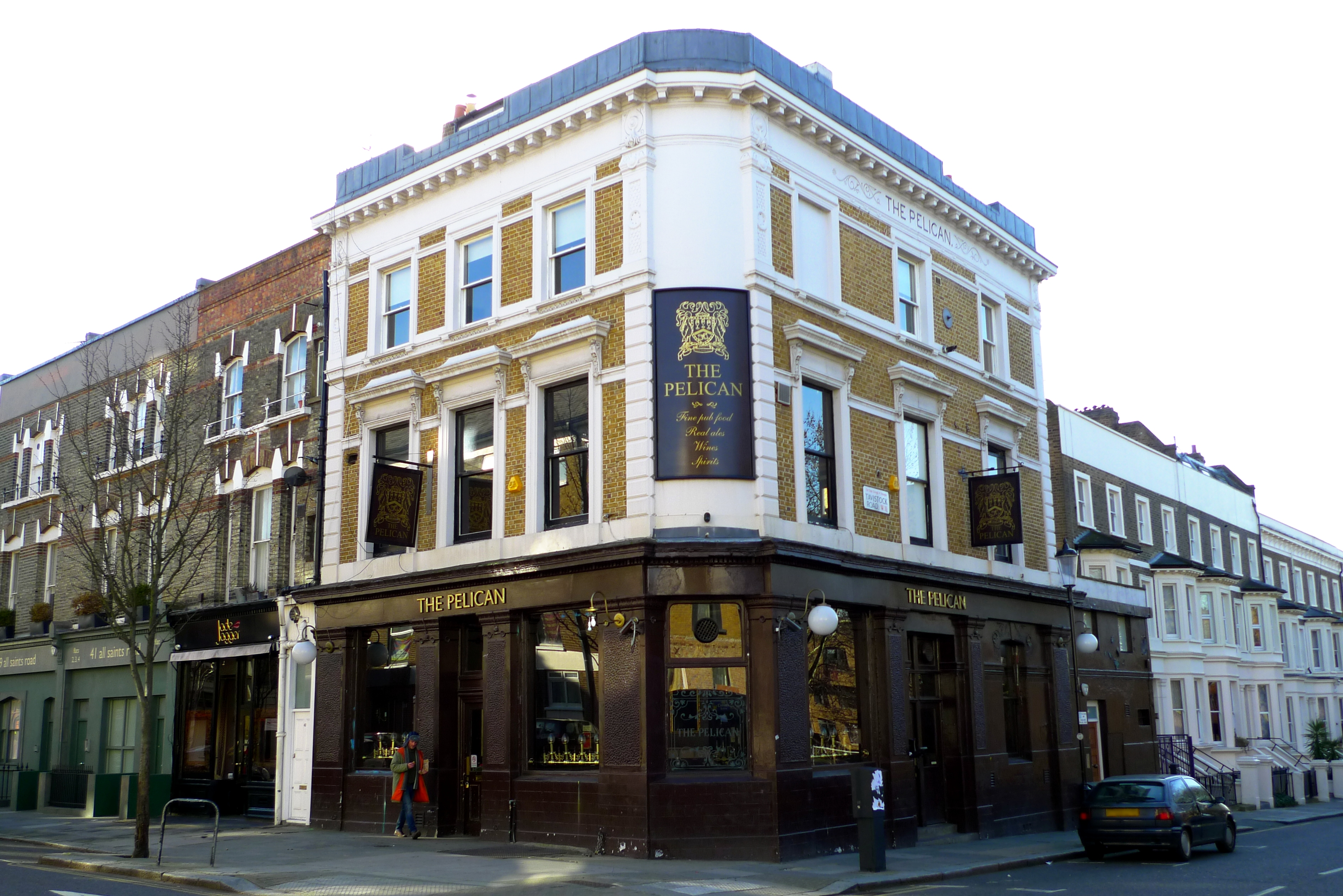
The Pelican pub at the junction of All Saints Road and Tavistock Road

All Saints Road is a street in London's Notting Hill district, best known as being an important centre for the UK's Afro-Caribbean community.

It runs north to south from Tavistock Crescent to Westbourne Park Road, and has junctions with Tavistock Road and Lancaster Road. All Saints Road runs parallel to Portobello Road, but two streets to the east.

In 1968, Trinidadian community activist and civil rights campaigner Frank Crichlow opened The Mangrove restaurant at No. 8, and by 1969 it was attracting serious police attention, leading to the arrest and trial of the Mangrove Nine in 1970–71.

Comedian Dom Joly lived in a top-floor flat there from 1992 to 2004.

The pop group All Saints was formed at a recording studio in the area. The British fashion retailer AllSaints, founded in 1994, takes its name from the street, as does the British independent record label All Saints Records, founded in 1991.
