= Lyndon Lea =

English financier and investor

- Born: 13 January 1969 (age 57); Morecambe, Lancashire, England
- Education: University of Western Ontario
- Occupations: Financier, investor
- Known for: Co-founding Lion Capital
- Spouse: Married

Lyndon Lea (born 13 January 1969) is an English financier and investor, known for co-founding Lion Capital which specializes in making investments in the consumer sector. Notable previous and current consumer brands owned by Lion have included Weetabix, Jimmy Choo, Wagamama, Kettle Foods and AllSaints.

== Early life ==
Lea was born in Morecambe, Lancashire, England. His mother was a hairdresser and his father was an engineer who loved travel . Lea spent his childhood growing up in South Africa, Botswana and moved at aged 13 to Canada, where he became a citizen. In 1990, after graduating in business administration from the University of Western Ontario, his career started in the mergers and acquisitions department of Goldman Sachs in New York working primarily on consumer deals. He returned to London in 1992 and, after a brief spell in the investment-banking division of Schroders, he was recruited with Neil Richardson, to start the European affiliate (Glenisla) of industry giant KKR. In 1998 he was spotted by Hicks, Muse, Tate & Furst and brought in to launch their new European business. At Hicks Muse he worked with consumer brands ranging from Mumm & Perrier-Jouet champagne brands to Typhoo tea and Branston Pickle. He also oversaw the flotations of Yell Group, the UK phone directories business, in 2003, and Premier Foods in 2004.

== Lion Capital ==
In 2004, Lea gained prominence by separating the European business he ran from its ailing American parent, Hicks Muse. Along with Robert Darwent, his Hicks Muse colleague, Lea co-founded Lion Capital and turned Lion Capital into one of the best-known firms in the investment business. Lea and Lion have invested in over 100 consumer brands in Europe and North America. The company currently employs 30 investment executives. Lea is known for his hands-on investing style and his ownership of high-profile fashion brands such as Jimmy Choo, AllSaints and John Varvatos has made him a staple of the UK and New York press. Not all of Lion's investments have been successful. Notably, La Senza, which Lea admits was one of the riskier investments for Lion, was not successful.

== Company holdings ==
Lea's career has been characterised by diverse company holdings including:

- Sold Champagne Mumm & Perrier-Jouet in 2001 to Allied Domecq
- Bought Weetabix in 2004 for £640 million and sold 60% to Bright Food in 2012 in a deal valuing the company at £1.2 billion
- Acquired Jimmy Choo in 2004 for £100 million and sold the company in 2007 for £225 million
- Acquired Wagamama in 2005 for £102 million and later sold the company for £215 million in 2011
- Acquired Orangina in 2006 in partnership with the Blackstone Group and later sold the company for €2.6 billion in 2009
- Acquired Kettle Foods in 2006 for $270 million and sold the company in 2010 for $615 million
- Acquired HEMA in 2007 for a deal estimated to be worth €1.3 billion
- Acquired the Findus and Young's brands in 2008 for £1.1 billion
- Acquired AS Adventure Group in 2008 for €263 million
- Invested $80 million in American Apparel in 2009
- Acquired Bumble Bee Foods for $980 million in 2010
- Purchased Picard in 2010 for €1.5 billion
- Acquired AllSaints in 2011
- Acquired Alain Afflelou in 2012 for €740 million
- Acquired John Varvatos in 2012
- Acquired Good Hair Day in 2013 for £300 million

Lea has also served on the board of several public companies including Harry Winston, American Apparel, Yell Group and Premier Foods.

== Personal life ==
In a personal capacity, Lea is an active supporter and advocate for Not For Sale, a charity that raises awareness of modern day slavery.

In August 2015, Lea married long-time girlfriend, model Sophie Dickens, whom he met at a charity polo match in 2010 when she was 18 and he was 41.

Lea is an avid polo player. In July 2011 his team won the Veuve Clicquot Gold Cup for the British Open Polo Championship, at Cowdray Park, West Sussex. The following April, Lea's team also won the U.S. Open Polo Championship. In 2013, Lea's team again won the U.S. Open Championships, achieving back-to-back victories. This was followed later in 2013 by an undefeated sweep of the UK season in which Lea's team won the Queen's Cup and again won the Veuve Clicquot Gold Cup for the British Open Championship. In 2014, Zacara once again won the prestigious Cartier Queen's Cup. Lea owns a polo ranch in Santa Barbara, California where he has reportedly hosted several lavish summer parties at his Californian beach house which have included entertainment from acts such as Cirque du Soleil and beautiful women.

Lea also studies Brazilian jiu-jitsu. Now under Leigh Remedios.

== Controversy ==
Since 2011, Lyndon Lea has been on the board of Not For Sale, an organization that addresses exploitation of people including "coercion for the purpose of labour or commercial sex". NFS has supported over 200,500 survivors and at-risk individuals – from Peru, the Netherlands, Thailand, Vietnam, the Democratic Republic of the Congo, Uganda, South Africa and Mozambique.

Lea and Epstein are understood to have been introduced by Sarah Ferguson’s friend Geir Frantzen, a former executive at the frozen food giant Findus, which was acquired by Lea’s firm Lion Capital.

According to emails between Lea and Epstein released as part of the Epstein files, Lea attended a dinner hosted by Epstein's associate Jean-Luc Brunel, who was also charged with sexual assault and human trafficking. On January 18, 2010 Epstein emailed Brunel saying: “It would be nice and i think beneficial for you to have a dinner for Lyndon Lea in New York this week.” Brunel replied: “Done… I am inviting also 10 models. You can tell him.”

Correspondence in the Epstein files also indicates that Epstein introduced a 25-year-old Romanian woman to Lea, who Lea subsequently referred to an internship at Findus and later to AllSaints. According to emails released as part of the Epstein files, Epstein messaged Lea that she was “serious, not a toy, toys are also available”, to which Lea responded: “She has been put into a proper roll. Its in her hands now.” Epstein said: “Thanks, i really appreciate it.” Subsequently, emails indicate that Lea invited the woman to a party but she told Epstein she did not go because her friend was not free and she would have known only Lea. Epstein replied: “That was a BIG mistake, Do not do it again. This is business, if you don’t got to dinners and parties, you will not be rehired.” Two months later a woman understood to have been the same person told Epstein she was “a bit afraid” of Lea. “About Lyndon I can say that maybe I was a bit afraid of, but can’t say why. I feel somehow that I own him for the help I’ve got from him,” she wrote.

The woman later wrote to Epstein that she was working as the executive assistant to CEO William Kim, and then described: "Also, wanted you to see William Kim, my ex-boss...current bf :) let me know what you think :). "The couple are now married and have two children.

In early 2010, Epstein appears to have arranged for a woman named Cindy Lopez, aged 27, to meet Lea for dinner and advised her on what to wear. She asked Epstein whether the “motive” was “business or pleasure”. Epstein replied “both”, adding that Lea was “cute, rich knows few people”.
