= E-OTD =

Enhanced Observed Time Difference (E-OTD) is a standard for the location of mobile telephones. The location method works by multilateration. The standardisation was first carried out for GSM by the GSM standard committees (T1P1.5 and ETIS) in LCS Release 98 and Release 99. The standardisation was continued for 3G and WCDMA mobile telephones by 3GPP.

Conceptually, the method is similar to U-TDOA, however, it involves time difference measurements being made in the handset rather than the network, and a mechanism to pseudo-synchronise the network. The handset makes an observation of the time difference of arrival of signals from two different base stations. These observations are known as Observed Time Difference (OTD). The handset measures the OTD between a number of different base stations. If the base stations were synchronised, then a single OTD defines a hyperbolic locus. A second, independent OTD, for which one of the observed base stations is spatially distinct from those in the first OTD, would provide a second hyperbolic locus, and the intersection of the two loci gives an estimate of the location of the mobile. If more than two independent OTDs are available, then the measurements can be combined to yield a more accurate measurement.

However, GSM and 3G networks are not necessarily synchronised, so further information is needed. The E-OTD standard provides a method for pseudo-synchronisation. A Location Measurement Unit (LMU) can be used to estimate the transmission time offset between two base stations. This measurement is known as the Real Time Difference (RTD). The RTD for two base stations can then be subtracted from the OTD for the same two base stations to produce the Geometric Time Difference (GTD). The GTD is the time difference that would have been measured by the mobile if the network was perfectly synchronised. Accordingly, the application of the RTD provides a pseudo-synchronisation.

An LMU is a receiver that is placed in a position in the network that is able to report the RTDs of a number of different base stations. If the base station clocks are not synchronised to a common source, then it is necessary to continuously update the RTDs, as the time offsets will be changing due to the clock drift in each base station.

The deployment of LMUs can be expensive, and so is a drawback of E-OTD. However, a 2003 paper describes a method of operating E-OTD without LMUs, and presents results of an operational trial. In essence, if there are sufficient independent OTD measurements such that the equation system is over-determined, then the additional information can be used to estimate the RTDs.

E-OTD was considered for the Enhanced 911 mandate, but ultimately was not a successful contender for this application. An active proponent and developer of E-OTD was Cambridge Positioning Systems (CPS). In 2007, CPS was acquired by CSR. In 2009, CSR merged with SIRF.

Because E-OTD requires a software modification to be included in the mobile phone, E-OTD positioning system has been less commonly used than the U-TDOA positioning system.

== See also ==
- Real time locating
- Locating Engines
- Multilateration
- U-TDOA
