= John Varvatos (company) =

American men's luxury lifestyle brand

- Type: Private
- Industry: Fashion
- Founded: 1999
- Founder: John Varvatos
- Headquarters: New York City
- Area served: Worldwide
- Website: johnvarvatos.com

John Varvatos is an international American luxury men's lifestyle brand founded by John Varvatos, that designs, manufactures, and retails high-end fashion, using rock aesthetics as the foundation of the brand's designs. The fashion collection is distributed in 10 freestanding John Varvatos boutiques across the US, as well as in high-end department stores throughout the world. The John Varvatos Headquarters are located in New York City.

== History ==
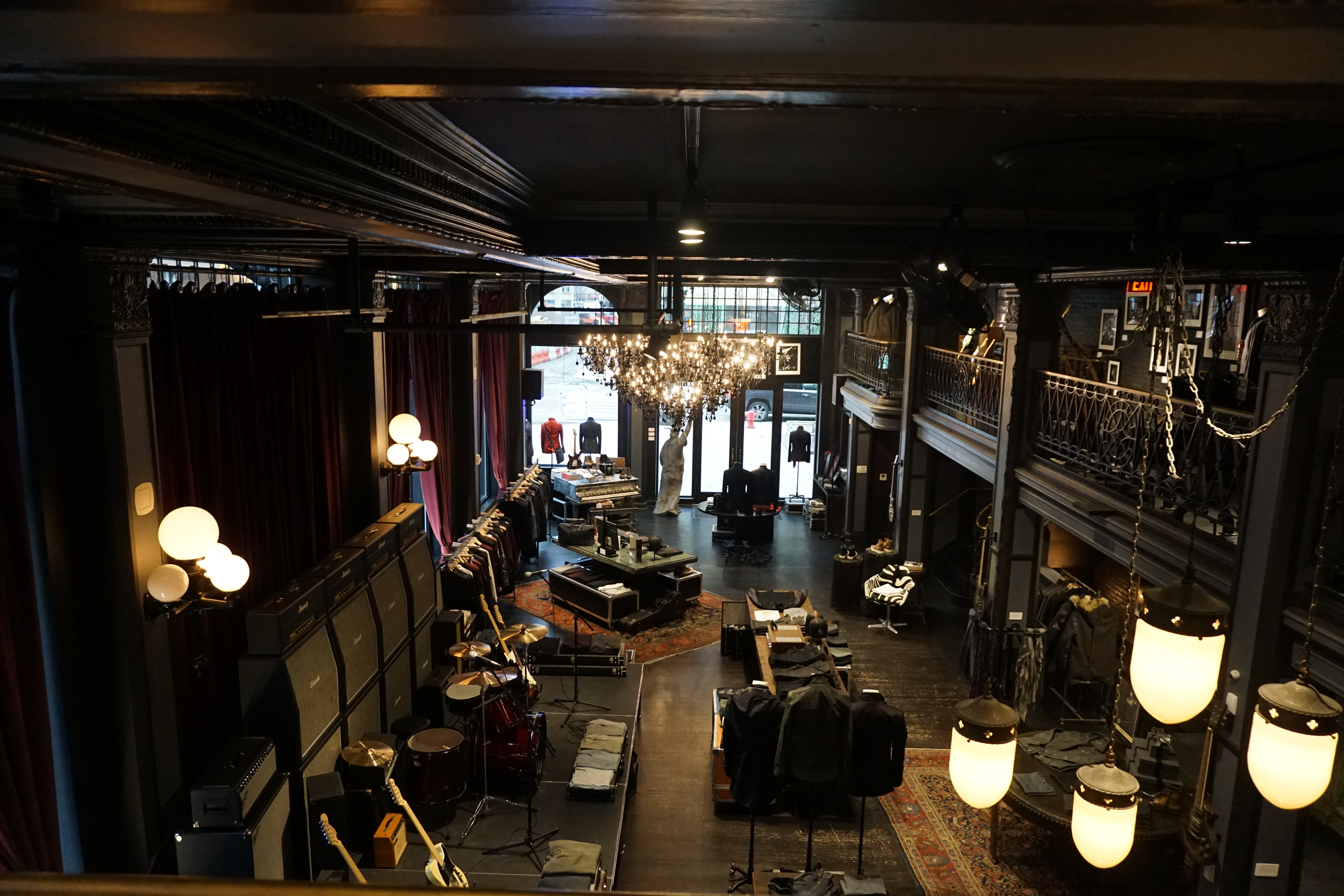
The interior of the John Varvatos store in Detroit

John Varvatos founded the company in late 1999. Varvatos had previously been the head of menswear design at Calvin Klein, as well as the head of menswear design for all Polo Ralph Lauren brands, and was responsible for the creation of the Polo Jeans Company. The debut clothing line was launched in 2000; a "black-less collection", in which Varvatos went against the popular fashion trends of the time.

The company’s first freestanding boutique, located in the SoHo neighborhood for New York City, opened in October 2000. Today, the brand has 10 independent retail locations across the United States.

In April 2008, Varvatos opened at 315 Bowery, formerly the rock ‘n’ roll landmark club CBGB. Here, Varvatos attempted to preserve the original allure of the landmark, displaying his clothes among vintage books, high-end stereo equipment and a preserved wall of the original club, including band flyers. The opening was celebrated with a benefit party for VH1's Save the Music. Today, the location hosts free monthly concerts, with a variety of music acts.

In 2010 and 2011, Lyndon Lea's Lion Capital purchased a majority stake in the company in March 2012, with Varvatos remaining as Chairman and Chief Creative Officer.

On May 6, 2020, due to the COVID-19 pandemic in the United States, it was reported the company was filing for Chapter 11 bankruptcy, citing $140 million in debt. In July 2020, the brand's private equity owner, Lion/Hendrix Cayman Ltd. received court approval to acquire the fashion brand, in exchange for forgiving $76 million of the company's debt.

In 2026, it emerged that John Varvatos chairman and owner Lyndon Lea maintained a friendship with Jeffrey Epstein even following Epstein's release from prison in late 2009 for soliciting a child for prostitution. According to emails in the Epstein files between Lea and Epstein, Lea attended a dinner hosted by Jean-Luc Brunel , who died in prison in 2022 while being held for rape and trafficking of minors. On January 18, 2010 Epstein emailed Brunel saying: “It would be nice and i thinnk beneficial for you to have a dinner for lyndon lea. in new york this week.” Brunel replied: “Done …I am inviting also 10 models. You can tell him.”

== Lines ==
=== John Varvatos collection ===
The main collection of the brand, John Varvatos, is high-end male clothing with rock 'n' roll influences. The line aims to create a masculine look, with a subtle edginess for the male demographic. The main collection was expanded over the years, and today includes jewelry, watches, eyewear, gloves, scarves, and other accessories.

In 2004 John Varvatos released his first male fragrance line under the main collection, and later expanded to include their first women's fragrance in 2008.

=== John Varvatos Star USA Luxe ===
In February 2006, John Varvatos launched "John Varvatos Star USA Luxe", an in-house label aimed at a younger demographic, and at a lower price point than the main collection.

=== Converse by John Varvatos ===
In September 2001, John Varvatos partnered with the US shoe company Converse, to create "Converse by John Varvatos". In 2004, Varvatos designed the laceless Converse Chuck Taylor slip-on. The design was widely adopted and imitated by competitors.

By March 2006, "Converse by John Varvatos" premiered the first ready-to-wear clothing line in Converse's history. A vintage-inspired line was also designed for a younger demographic.

== Other collaborations ==
In 2012, John Varvatos partnered with Chrysler, to design two special edition Chrysler 300C. Varvatos was recruited to create two editions, the "Limited Edition" and the "Luxury Edition", both of which feature the brand's design and name. Later in 2012, Varvatos became the first fashion brand to partner with Patrón Spirits, for a limited edition bottle stopper.

== Awards and distinctions ==
John Varvatos first received accolades from the Council of Fashion Designers of America (CFDA) in 2000, when he was honored with the Perry Ellis Newcomer's Award for Menswear. The following year, he won the 2001 CFDA's Designer of the Year award.

In 2005, Varvatos received the CFDA's 2005 Menswear Designer of the Year award. He competed for the top honor along with Ralph Lauren and John Bartlett for his third CFDA win.

In 2007, GQ's named Varvatos "Designer of the Year" in its 12th Annual "Men of the Year" issue.
