= Spaghetti House siege =

1975 hostage situation in London, England

Coordinates: 51.5021°N 0.1577°W

Police outside the Spaghetti House during the siege

The Spaghetti House siege took place between 28 September and 3 October 1975. An attempted robbery of the Spaghetti House restaurant in Knightsbridge, London, went wrong and the police were quickly on the scene. The three robbers took the staff down into a storeroom and barricaded themselves in. They released all the hostages unharmed after six days. Two of the gunmen gave themselves up; the ringleader, Franklin Davies, shot himself in the stomach. All three were later imprisoned, as were two of their accomplices.

The three robbers had been involved in black liberation organisations and maintained consistently that they were acting for political reasons. The police did not believe them, and stated that this was a criminal act, not a political one.

The police used fibre optic camera technology for live surveillance, and monitored the actions and conversations of the gunmen from the audio and visual output. The feed was watched by a forensic psychiatrist who advised police on the state of the men's minds and how to best manage the ongoing negotiations.

== Background ==
Post-Second World War Britain had a shortage of labour, which led to official policies to attract workers from the British Empire and Commonwealth countries. These people were placed in low-pay, low-skill employment, which forced them to live in poor housing. Economic circumstances and what were seen by many in the black communities as racist policies applied by the British government led to a rise in militancy, particularly among the West Indian community; their feelings were exacerbated by police harassment and discrimination in the education sector. (Note: During the siege, a statement signed by the Black Unity and Freedom party, Afro-Caribbean Group, Brixton-Croydon Collective and Fasimbas was released, providing the socio-political background into the motives of the three men. The statement identified: the social context within which these youths have had to exist ... normal avenues to other members of society were closed to them ... the action of the brothers symbolises the plight of the black community and suggests government action be taken on ... miseducation of black children particularly with regard to their placement in ESN [Educationally Sub-Normal] schools ... an independent enquiry into the degrading housing conditions in the black communities ... that the government commits itself to alleviating the high rates of unemployment among workers in general and the abnormally high rate among black youths in particular.) Ambalavaner Sivanandan, the director of the Institute of Race Relations in the mid-1970s, identifies that while the first generation had become partly assimilated into British society, the second generation were increasingly rebellious.

The ringleader of the attempted robbery of a branch of the Spaghetti House restaurant was Franklin Davies, a 28-year-old Nigerian student who had previously served time in prison for armed robbery; he was accompanied by two men, Wesley Dick (later known as Shujaa Moshesh), a 24-year-old West Indian, and Anthony "Bonsu" Munroe, a 22-year-old Guyanese. All three had been involved in black liberation organisations. Davies had tried to enlist in the guerrilla armies of Zimbabwe African National Union and FRELIMO in Africa; Munroe had links to the Black Power movement; Dick was an attendee at meetings of the Black Panthers, the Black Liberation Front (BLF), the Fasimba, (Note: The Fasimba was a youth organisation involved in the black liberation movement. It was merged into the BLF in 1972.) and the Black Unity and Freedom Party; he regularly visited the offices of the Institute of Race Relations to volunteer and access their library. Sivanandan and the historian Rob Waters identify that the three men were attempting to obtain money to "finance black supplementary schools and support African liberation struggles".

In the mid-1970s the branch managers of the London-based Spaghetti House restaurant chain met every Saturday night at the company's location at 77 Knightsbridge, after closing their branches at the end of the evening's business. The managers deposited their week's takings at the Knightsbridge restaurant, before it was deposited in a night safe at a nearby bank.

== Attempted robbery: 28 September 1975 ==
At approximately 1:30 am on Sunday 28 September 1975 Davies, Moshesh and Munroe entered the Knightsbridge branch of the Spaghetti House. One carried a sawn-off shotgun, the others each carried a handgun. The three demanded the week's takings from the chain—between £11,000 and £13,000. (Note: Sources differ as to the amount of money involved. The biography of Sir Robert Mark—the Commissioner of the Metropolitan Police at the time of the siege—and a history of the Black Museum put the figure at £13,000; a report in The Observer states that it was £11,000; a news report covering the trial reports that it was £12,284.) (Note: According to calculations based on the Consumer Price Index measure of inflation, £11,000 in 1975 equates to approximately equivalent to £90,000 in 2025, while £13,000 the same year equates to approximately equivalent to £100,000 in 2025.) In the dim lights of the closed restaurant, the staff were able to swiftly hide the two briefcases of money under the tables. The robbers forced the staff down into the basement; the company's general manager took the opportunity to escape out of a rear fire escape while they were being moved. He alerted the Metropolitan Police, who arrived on the scene within minutes. The getaway driver, Samuel Addison, saw the plan had gone wrong, and drove off in a previously stolen Ford. When the police entered the ground floor of the restaurant, Davies and his colleagues forced the staff into a rear storeroom measuring 14 by 10 feet (4.3 by 3.0 m), locked the door, barricaded it with beer kegs and shouted to the police that they would shoot if they approached the door; the police surrounded the building and the siege began.

== Siege: 28 September – 3 October ==
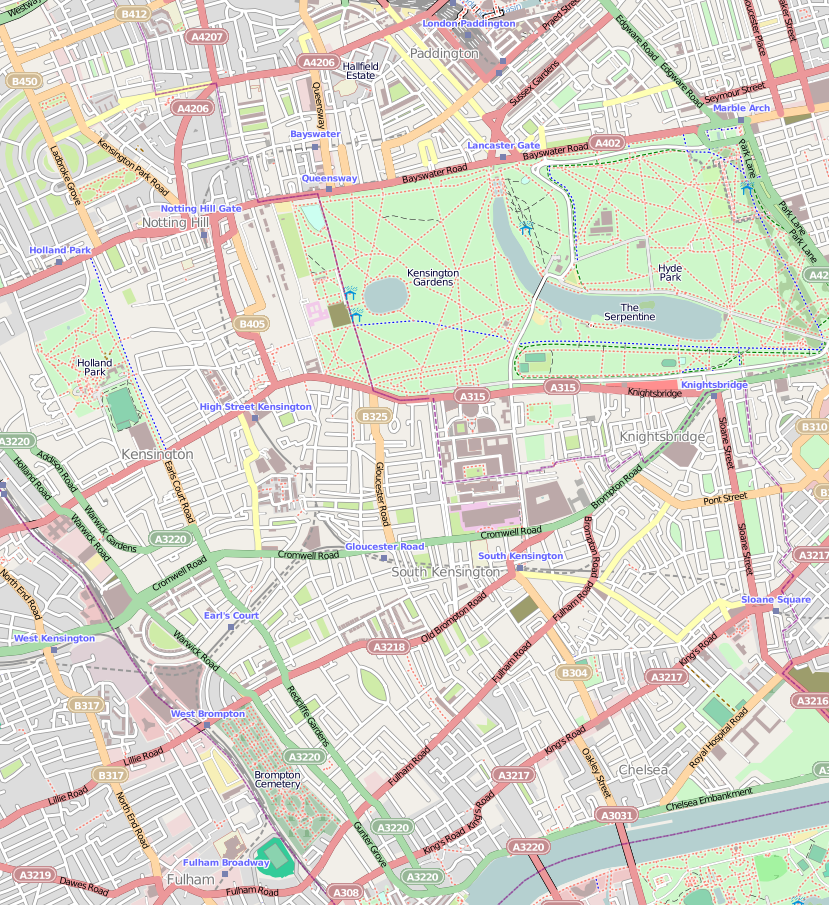
Spaghetti House restaurant, Knightsbridge

In the initial conversations the hostage-takers provided the police with the names of the hostages they held and Davies's identity and criminal record was established. By 7:00 am the police had sealed off the area and put a cordon in place; 400 police officers were involved—including dog-handlers—and D11, the Metropolitan Police's marksmen, was deployed. (Note: British police officers do not routinely carry firearms.)

Davies informed police that he was a captain in the BLF, (Note: Two days later he stated that he was a major.) but in a subsequent message said that the men were members of the Black Liberation Army, an American Black Panther splinter group. Davies made several demands to the police. He wanted two black prisoners released from prison, although he did not know that they had already been released. He also wanted the Home Secretary to visit the siege, an aircraft made available to fly to the West Indies and a radio for them to listen to the news broadcasts of the situation. Only the request for a radio was granted.

Initially the police considered that the siege may have been a terrorist incident, (Note: Because it was considered a potential terrorist incident, in addition to their usual weapons, the officers from D11 were armed with Sterling submachine guns, pump action shotguns and Browning pistols. Explosives were later provided to be used to blow the hinges from the storeroom door.) but were subsequently dismissive of any political motivation, and insisted that it was only ever a criminal action. Sir Robert Mark—the Commissioner of the Metropolitan Police at the time of the siege—later wrote:

From the outset it was rightly assumed that this was a simple armed robbery that had gone wrong and any attempts by Davies, the Nigerian, to represent it as a political act were received with the derision they clearly deserved.

Tony Soares, one of the founders of the BLF, told police he knew the three men, and offered to mediate, but his offer was turned down. He added that the BLF was a peaceful organisation, and that it did not know of or support the robbery. Jenny Bourne, the co-editor of Race & Class, knew all three men and thinks they "probably had very different motives" for the robbery. Overall she considers the three, particularly Wesley Dick, were driven by

the actualities of racism on the ground in Britain ... It was essentially the words of Angela Davis, George Jackson, Bobby Seale and Malcolm X that honed the resistance: "Seize the time", "Off the pigs", "Fuck the man" were the themes they transposed to Britain.

On the morning of 29 September—fifteen hours after the siege had begun—one of the hostages was released as a sign of good faith. He was a 59-year-old manager of one of the outlets. On the second day another hostage was released after he fell ill. During the course of the siege Mario Manca, the Italian consul general, attempted to liaise with the men, acting as a go-between. At one stage he offered to change places with one of the hostages who was unwell, but the offer was declined. Lord Pitt, the former chairman of the Greater London Council who was West Indian-born, also attempted to negotiate with the men, but had limited success.

Peter Scott, a forensic psychiatrist at the Maudsley Hospital, gave advice about the mental state of the criminals throughout the siege. He told the police that the longer the siege went on, the more an emotional transference would take place, in which the gunmen would be less likely to kill the hostages. On his advice, the main strategy of the police was to wait as long as was needed, keep the situation calm and to talk to the hostage takers as long as possible. The siege saw an early use of fibre optic camera technology by the police as a live surveillance technique. Two cameras were used to observe what was happening in the basement storeroom. One was threaded through the wall alongside a hot water pipe; the second way was through a vent, after acid was dripped onto the metal vent using an eyedropper, to make a small hole. The police were able to monitor the movement and conversations of the three hostage-takers.

The police persuaded the media to assist them. They asked The Daily Mail not to publish a story about the arrest of one of the gang's associates. Using the information and advice from Scott, the police attempted to drive a wedge between Davies and his two colleagues. On the fourth day the police pushed a copy of The Daily Express under the door of the storeroom. It showed a photograph of Davies on the front page, describing him as the leader, and providing background information from his associates, making it look like the gang's associates were selling the information to the newspapers. Across the front page, the police wrote the name of the person suspected of providing the arms. The following day, when two of the co-conspirators were arrested, police briefed the media about the arrests and stressed the criminal, not political, aspects of the case. The men heard the news on the radio that evening, which lowered their spirits. The following morning, the men decided to surrender.

At 2:55 am the gunmen turned out the lights and began a discussion among themselves. At 3:40 am they told the police that they were giving up. After the hostages came out first—all unharmed—the police told the three men to come out one at a time. The first two threw their guns out and followed; as police led them away there was a gunshot from the room, where Davies had shot himself in the stomach with a .22 rimfire revolver. In his pocket police found a note he had written to his brother just before the robbery:

Today I set out on a mission for the people. If things go wrong I shall pass over to the warrior's rest. So if this note reaches you, it would mean that I am dead. You must accept what happens to me as it should be accepted—with joy—because it is the most natural fate that awaits any of us blacks conscious enough to try and do something about our pathetic state of existence.

== Aftermath ==
Davies was taken to St George's Hospital where he underwent an operation; the bullet was not removed during the process. The hostages were also taken to the same hospital for a check-up, but none needed treatment. They then gave preliminary statements to the police at Canon Row Police Station.

While on remand, Davies went on hunger strike. He was visited regularly by Giovanni Scrano, one of the hostages from the siege, who had built up a relationship with Davies during the incident; the relationship was later identified as an example of Stockholm syndrome.

The trial opened on 8 June 1976. As well as Davies, Dick and Munroe, three accomplices were present, charged with different offences, including assisting the robbery (the getaway driver), supplying firearms, and conspiracy charges. Davies, Dick and Munroe refused to accept the legitimacy of the court. When asked how they pleaded to the charges, Davies shouted "We've stopped pleading—we've been pleading for 500 years. This isn't a trial—it's a lynching party." The three men turned their backs on the court and talked between themselves. The judge, Mervyn Griffith-Jones, ordered that the three men be taken back to their cells and that a plea of not guilty be entered on their behalf. One of the accomplices, Lillo Termine, pleaded guilty to the charges of conspiracy to rob the restaurant. Police said that he had been the one behind the robbery, and had planned it to pay off gambling debts. The trial ended on 30 June. Davies, Dick and Munroe were sentenced to 22, 18 and 17 years in prison respectively; Termine was given six years. One of the accomplices was acquitted and Addison, the getaway driver, was sent for re-trial as the jury could not reach a verdict. That November, following the second trial, Addison was found guilty and imprisoned for eleven years. Davies, Dick and Munroe died after being released from prison, two of them at relatively young ages; Dick changed his name to Shujaa Moshesh by the time of his death in Africa.

The Spaghetti House restaurant re-opened for business a week after the siege ended. In 2015 the Knightsbridge branch closed for business so the block could be redeveloped.

In early December 1975 members of the Provisional Irish Republican Army (IRA) were cornered in a flat on Balcombe Street, London, leading to a six-day siege by police. The lessons learned from the Spaghetti House siege, including the use of live surveillance and forensic psychologists, were put into use to bring the siege to a successful conclusion for the police. Peter Waddington, in his study of policing, writes that the police's "reputation for restraint received dramatic vindication by the way in which two highly publicised sieges were handled by the Metropolitan Police". The police used the same tactics at the Iranian Embassy siege in 1980, until the terrorists killed one of the hostages, which led to a change in tactics and the use of the Special Air Service (SAS) to storm the building. Waddington considers "If there was criticism it was that the police showed an excessive disinclination to resort to force in such circumstances."

In 1976 Horace Ové, the Trinidadian-born writer and filmmaker, wrote the play A Hole in Babylon, based on the events at the restaurant; the play was later broadcast on the BBC's Play for Today series. Another fictionalised account of the crime, The Siege of Babylon, was written by Farrukh Dhondy in 1978. In 1982 Spaghetti House, an Italian comedy film, was produced which was loosely based on the events of the siege.

== Notes and references ==
=== Sources ===
==== Books, journals and websites ====
- Bourne, Jenny (2011). "Spaghetti House Siege: Making the Rhetoric Real". Race & Class. 53 (2): 1–13. doi:10.1177/0306396811414319.
- Clark, Gregory (2023). "The Annual RPI and Average Earnings for Britain, 1209 to Present (New Series)". MeasuringWorth.
- Gerrard, Neil (12 January 2015). "Spaghetti House to Close Knightsbridge Site After 46 Years". The Caterer.
- Gould, Robert; Waldren, Michael (1986). London's Armed Police. London: Arms and Armour Press. ISBN 978-0-85368-880-8.
- Keily, Jackie; Hoffbrand, Julia (2015). The Crime Museum Uncovered. London: IB Tauris. ISBN 978-1-78130-041-1.
- Kelley, Robin; Tuck, Stephen (2016). The Other Special Relationship: Race, Rights, and Riots in Britain and the United States. London: Palgrave Macmillan. ISBN 978-1-137-39270-1.
- Mark, Robert (1978). In the Office of Constable. London: Collins. ISBN 978-0-00-216032-2.
- Manwaring-White, Sarah (1983). Policing Revolution: Police Technology and Liberty in Britain. Brighton: Harvester Press. ISBN 978-0710806154.
- Moss, Alan; Skinner, Keith (2015). Scotland Yard's History of Crime in 100 Objects (Kindle ed.). Stroud, Glos: The History Press. ISBN 978-0-7509-6655-9.
- Ochberg, Frank M. (1982). "The Victims of Terrorism: The Moluccan Train Incident". In Cowley, R. Adams (ed.). Mass Casualties, a Lessons Learned Approach: Accidents, Civil Disorders, Natural Disasters, Terrorism. Washington DC: U.S. Department of Transportation, National Highway Traffic Safety Administration. OCLC 173447703.
- Sivanandan, Ambalavaner (1 April 1976). "Race, Class and the State: the Black Experience in Britain". Race & Class. 17 (4): 347–368. doi:10.1177/030639687601700401.
- Sivanandan, Ambalavaner (2008). Catching History on the Wing: Race, Culture and Globalisation. London: Pluto Press. ISBN 978-0-7453-2834-8.
- "Q&A: Armed police in the UK". BBC. 8 June 2010.
- Sands-O'Connor, Karen (2017). Children's Publishing and Black Britain, 1965–2015. New York: Springer. ISBN 978-1-137-57904-1.
- "Spaghetti House (1982)". British Film Institute. Archived from the original on 16 August 2018.
- "Spaghetti House Siege". Real-Life Crimes. 2 (30): 662–667. 1993.
- Waddington, P. A. J. (1991). The Strong Arm of the Law: Armed and Public Order Policing. Oxford: Oxford University Press. ISBN 978-0-1982-7359-2.
- Waldren, Michael (2007). Armed Police: Police Use of Firearms Since 1945. Stroud, Gloucestershire: Sutton Publishing Ltd. ISBN 978-0-7509-4637-7.
- Waters, Rob (2018). Thinking Black: Britain, 1964–1985. Oakland, CA: University of California Press. ISBN 978-0-5202-9385-4.

==== News articles ====
- Borrell, Clive (4 October 1975). "Hostages released Unharmed After Five Days". The Times. p. 1.
- Borrell, Clive (9 June 1976). "Accused Halt Spaghetti House Siege Trial". The Times. p. 3 – via Gale.
- Horsnell, Michael (29 September 1975a). "London Gunmen Take Hostages After Robbery That 'Went Wrong'". The Times. p. 1.
- Horsnell, Michael (30 September 1975b). "Restaurant Gunmen Free Hostage". The Times. pp. 1–2.
- Jordan, Philip (4 October 1975). "Softly, Softly Tactics Win at Knightsbridge". The Guardian. p. 16 – via Newspapers.com.
- Knewstub, Nikki; McHardy, Anne; Pallister, David (29 September 1975). "Siege Police Search for Freed West Indians". The Guardian. p. 1 – via Newspapers.com.
- McHardy, Anne (2 October 1975). "Black Voices". The Guardian. p. 11 – via Newspapers.com.
- Niesewand, Peter; Pallister, David (4 October 1975). "Radio Brought Down Spaghetti Gunmen". The Guardian. pp. 1, 20 – via Newspapers.com.
- "Siege Man Loses". The Guardian. 12 November 1976. p. 3 – via Newspapers.com.
- "Siege Man's Farewell Notes". The Guardian. 16 June 1976. p. 6 – via Newspapers.com.
- "Siege-Trial Jury Told of 'Death Lottery'". The Times. 10 June 1976. p. 3 – via Gale.
- "Spaghetti Man Fasts in Prison". The Observer. 7 March 1976. p. 3 – via Newspapers.com.
- Walker, Martin (9 June 1976a). "Spaghetti House Siege Trio Ordered Back to Cells". The Guardian. p. 1.
- Walker, Martin (1 July 1976b). "Psychology of the Stake Out". The Guardian. p. 16 – via Newspapers.com.
- Walker, Martin (1 July 1976c). "Four in Spaghetti Siege Trial Get 62 Years in Prison". The Guardian. p. 6 – via Newspapers.com.
