= 55–91 Knightsbridge =

Mansion block development in London

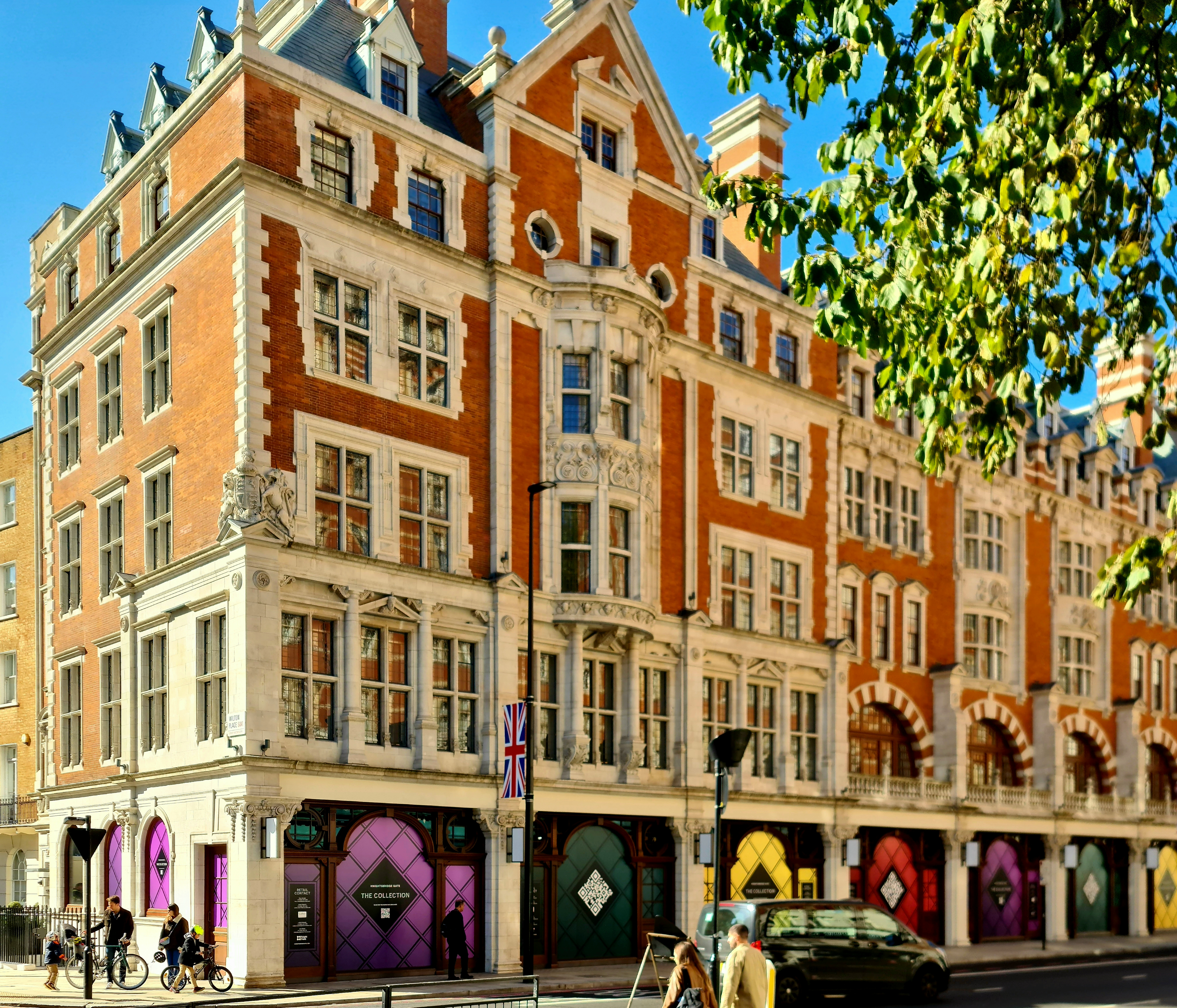
- 55–91 Knightsbridge
- Interactive map of the 55–91 Knightsbridge area

General information
- Type: Residential with ground floor used for shops
- Architectural style: Edwardian
- Location: London, England
- Coordinates: 51°30′08″N 0°09′26″W
- Completed: 1903

Design and construction
- Architect: W. D. Caröe

Listed Building – Grade II
- Official name: 55-91, Knightsbridge
- Designated: 08 June 1982
- Reference no.: 1221608

55–91 Knightsbridge is a Grade II listed Edwardian mansion block development located in the Knightsbridge area of London. The mansions sit opposite the Parkside mansions across the road, developed a few years afterwards.

== History ==
The development of the block reflected a need to widen the road, one of the first acts of urban improvement proposed by the London County Council in 1889. Houses were demolished to make way for the commencement of building work in 1902, completing in 1903. W. D. Caröe would serve as the architect of the project.

In 1975, the building was the site of the Spaghetti House Siege, an incident involving a hostage situation in the Knightsbridge branch of Spaghetti House. The branch was located at 77 Knightsbridge and would close in 2015.

Beginning in 2016, refurbishment would be carried out on the buildings, with the block being advertised as "Knightsbridge Gate".

== Design ==
The building is a typical mansion block design with residential units over shop space on the ground floor. It is built of brick with stone dressings topped with a green slate roof. The Historic England listing entry describes the building as being built in an "Eclectic classical style with Flemish touches".

Notable features include a plaque marking the Coronation of Edward VII reading "ANNO EDW VII CORONATIONIS". The building is further adorned with six busts, representing Edward VII, Queen Alexandra, Lord Roberts and Lord Kitchener both celebrated for their role in the Boer War, the Archbishop of Canterbury, Frederick Temple and the Prime Minister, Lord Salisbury.

== See also ==
- Knightsbridge
- Park Mansions
- Parkside, Knightsbridge
