= Shujaa Moshesh =

Black British political activist and poet

Shujaa Moshesh (born Wesley Dick) was a Black British political activist who was imprisoned after the Spaghetti House siege. While in prison he became a prisoners' rights activist. He also wrote poetry.

Moshesh became involved in Black Power activism in the early 1970s. He attended meetings of the Black Panthers, the Fasimbas, the Black Liberation Front (BLF), and the Black Unity and Freedom Party.

Moshesh was sentenced to 18 years in jail on 30 June 1976, and was first eligible for parole on 19 July 1988, before his actual release in August of that year.
