= George Dennis Martin =

English architect

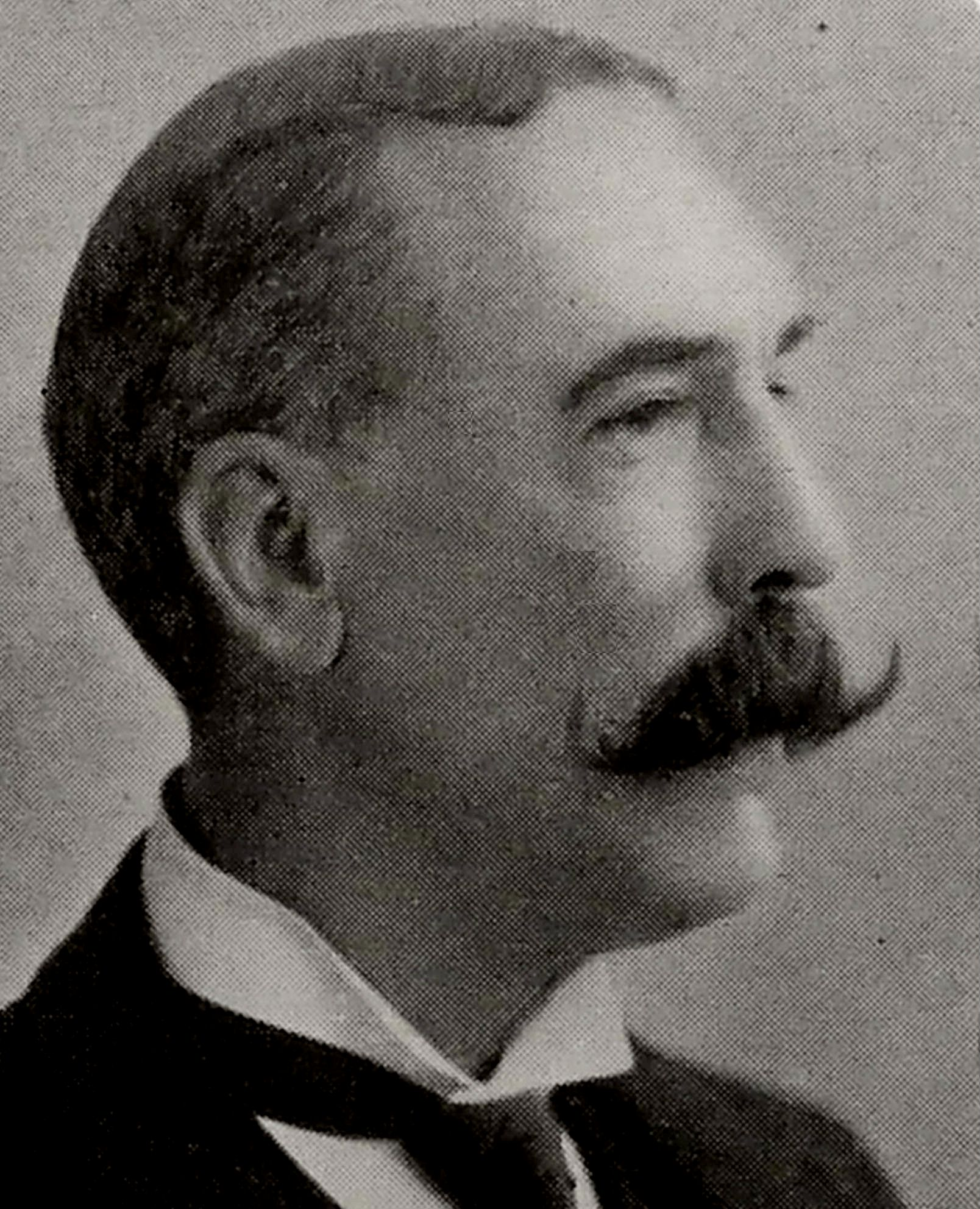
George Dennis Martin, in 1915

George Dennis Martin, F.S.I. (20 December 1847 - 26 April 1915) was an English architect based in London.

== History ==
He was born on 20 December 1847, the son of George and Cordelia Martin and baptised on 21 January 1848 at St Olave's Church, Southwark. He was educated at Dulwich College and South Kensington School of Art. He was articled to the architect Charles Laws in London.

He started in independent practice in 1872. He was Architect and Surveyor to the Central London Properties’ Syndicate. In partnership with Edward Keynes Purchase (1862-1923) he was architect and director of the Bedford Court Mansion Company from 1883 to 1895. He was a Fellow of the Surveyor’s Institution (FSI)

He married Jane Sim, daughter of James Sim, at St George’s Church, Hannover Square, London, on 23 February 1876. He died at 8 Bristol House, Southampton Row, London on 26 April 1915 and left an estate of £180 6s 6d (equivalent to £16,000 in 2025) to his widow.

== Works ==
- Craven House, 16 Northumberland Avenue, London 1885 (with Edward Keynes Purchase)
- Piccadilly Mansions, Shaftesbury Avenue, London 1888-89 (with Edward Keynes Purchase)
- 66-86 Shaftesbury Avenue, London 1888-89 (with Edward Keynes Purchase)
- 138 and 140 Shaftesbury Avenue (with Edward Keynes Purchase)
- 1-8 Irving Street, Leicester Square, London 1895-97
- St George’s House, 14-17 Wells Street, London 1896-97
- Berners Street Mansions, Berners Street and Mortimer Street, London 1897
- Hotel, Dover Street, Piccadilly, London 1898
- T.H. Brooke Hitchings, 235-241 Regent Street, London 1898
- Alhambra Theatre of Varieties, Attercliffe, Sheffield 1898 (with Arthur Blomfield Jackson) (demolished in 1962)
- DoubleTree by Hilton Harrogate Majestic Hotel & Spa (previously known as The Majestic Hotel) 1898-1900
- 14 Ryder Street (Ryder Court) Former Marlborough Hotel, London 1897
- New Premises for A.J. Sanderson (on the site of Bedford Chapel), New Oxford Street/Bloomsbury Street, London 1899 (now demolished)
- Paxtons Head, 153 Knightsbridge, London 1900-02
- House at Willenhall Park, Barnet, London 1901
- Durham Ox public house (now Bodega), Pelham Street, Nottingham 1902
- Park Mansions, Knightsbridge, London 1902
- Park Lodge, Knightsbridge, London 1902
- Offices, Finsbury Circus/East Street, London 1903
- 13-27 Brompton Road (with 2-8 Basil Street and Brompton Arcade) 1903-04
- 85-86 Jermyn Street, London 1905
- Harewood House, Hanover Square (north side), London 1909 (with Blow & Billerey)
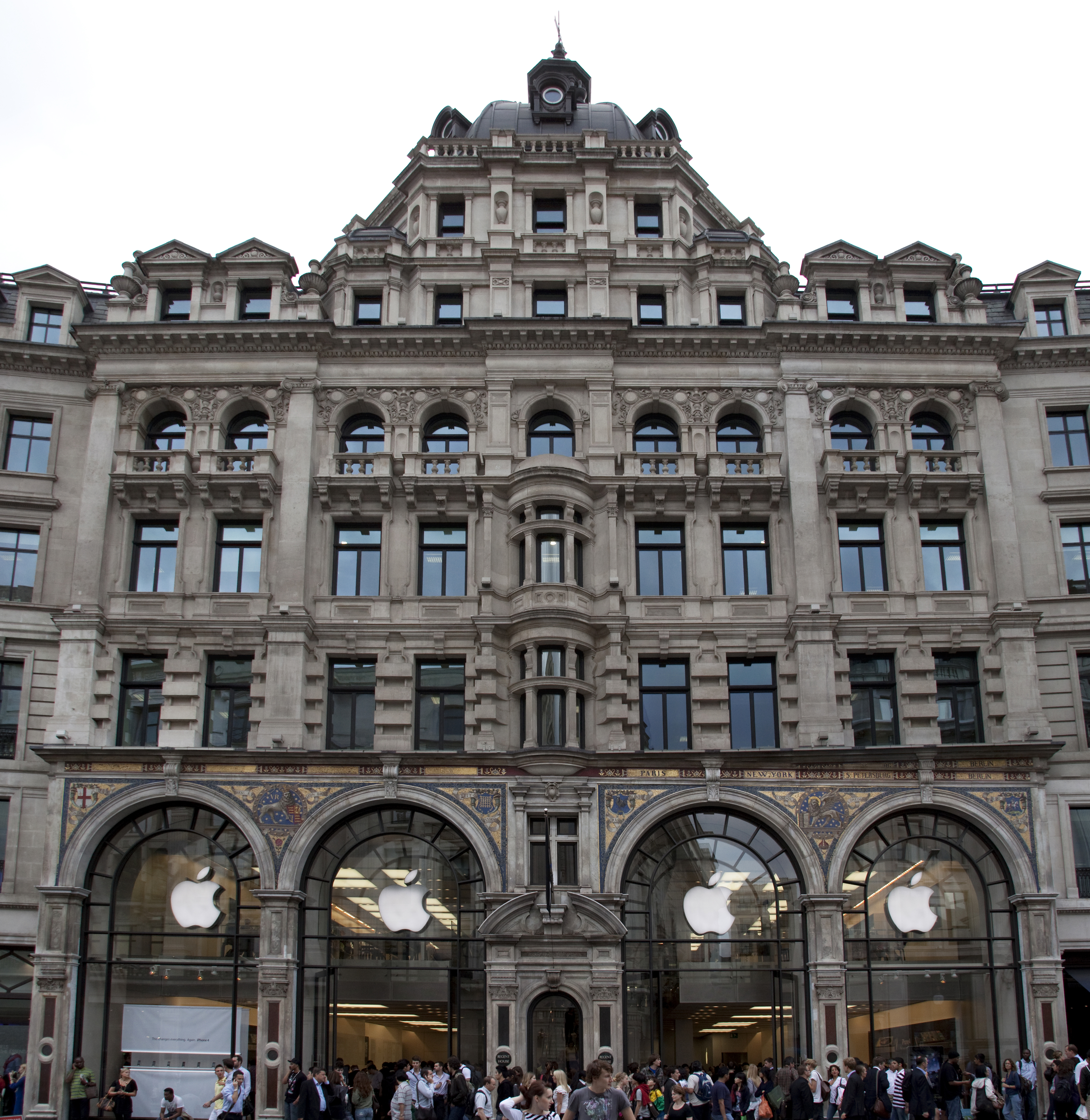
235-241 Regent Street, London 1898

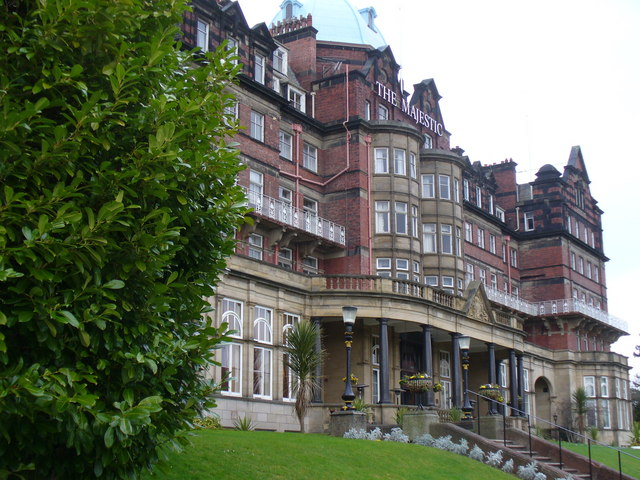
Hotel Majestic, Harrogate 1898-1900

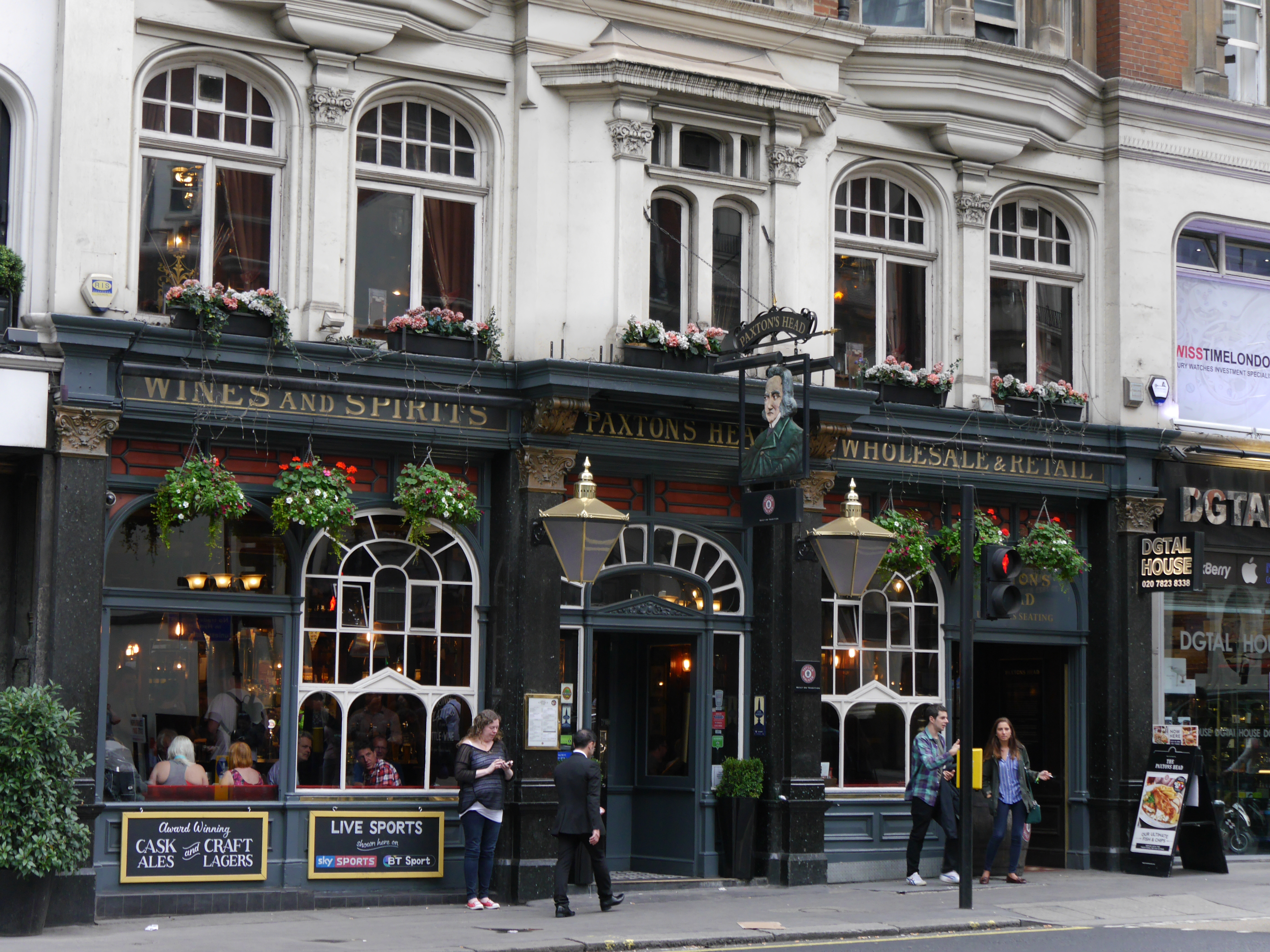
Paxtons Head 153 Knightsbridge, London 1900-02
