= Scotch Corner (Knightsbridge) =

Road junction in London, England

Coordinates: 51.50177°N 0.16057°W

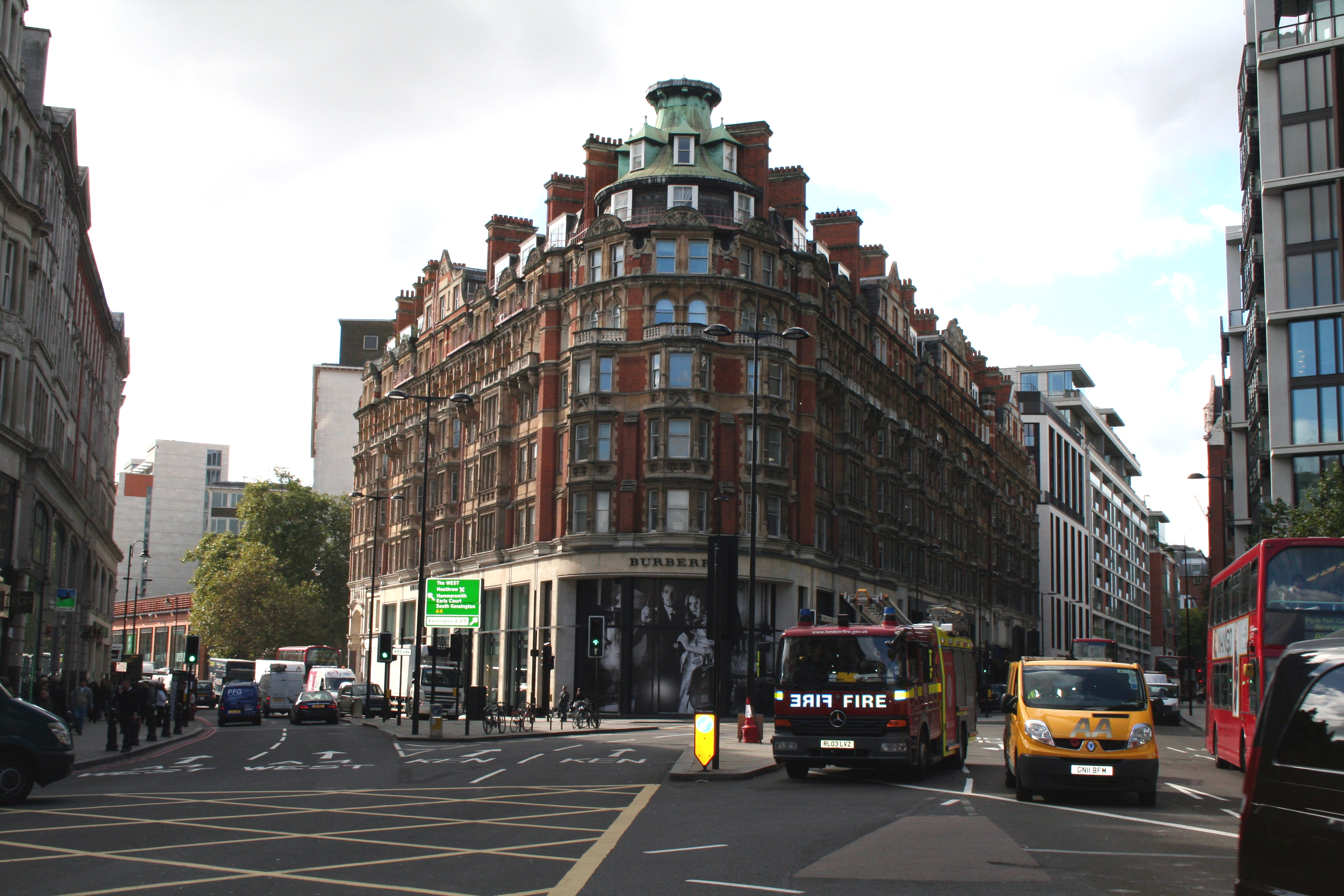
Scotch Corner, the Park Mansions building formerly housed the Scotch House after which the junction is named

Scotch Corner is the road junction of Knightsbridge with the inceptive Brompton Road and Sloane Street. It is within the City of Westminster, facing the Royal Borough of Kensington and Chelsea.

It was informally named after The Scotch House, clothing retail store which used to be on the western corner. Other landmarks in the vicinity within Westminster – which takes in the park – have included Bowater House, now replaced by One Hyde Park, and the Hyde Park Hotel across from Harvey Nichols department store in the Royal Borough of Kensington and Chelsea.
