= Paxtons Head =

Pub in Knightsbridge, London

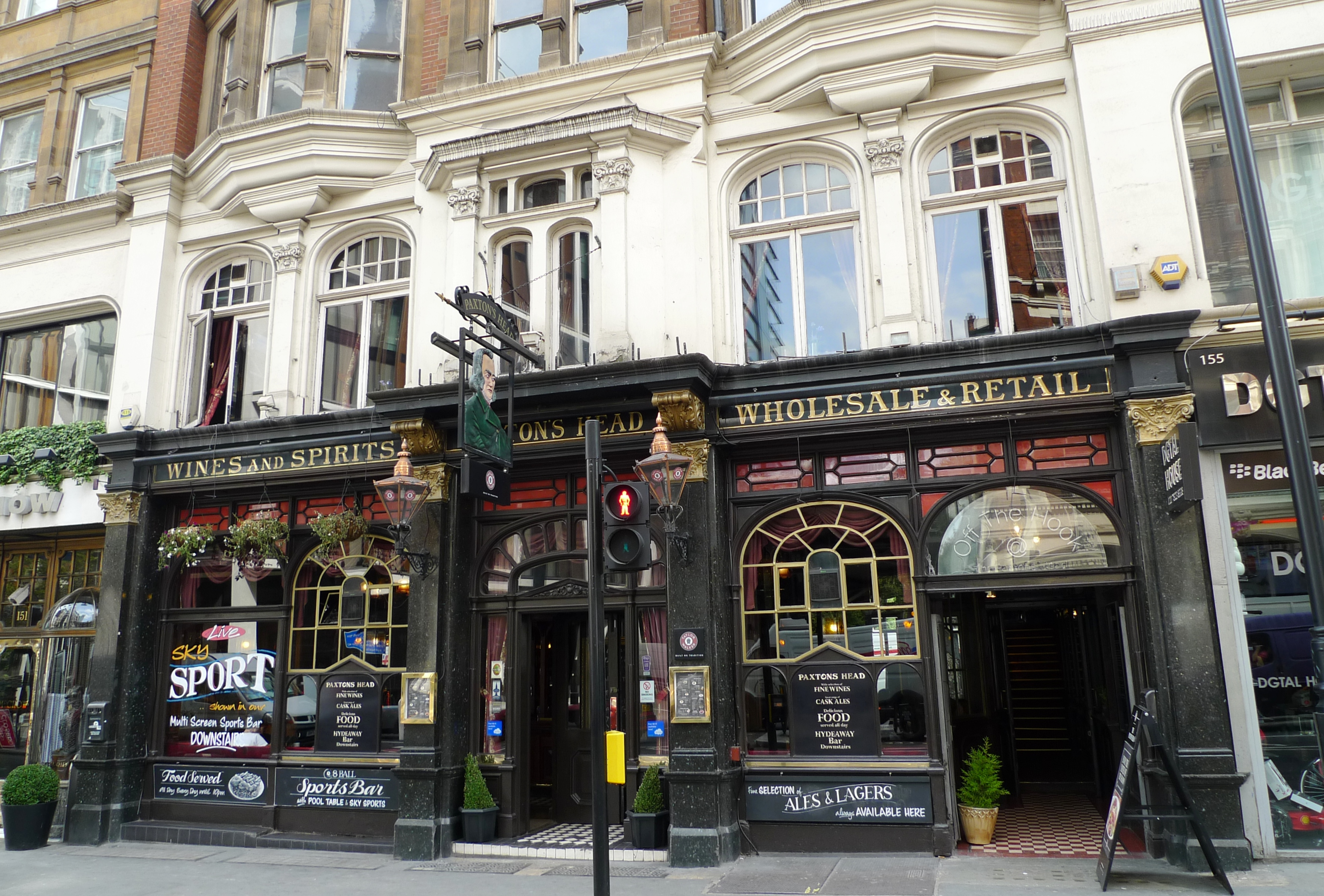
- Paxtons Head
- Interactive map of Paxtons Head
- 51°30′5″N 0°9′44″W
- Type: Public house
- Location: 153 Knightsbridge, London

History
- Built: 1900–02

Site notes
- Architect: George Dennis Martin

Listed Building – Grade II
- Official name: PAXTONS HEAD
- Designated: 27-Jul-2000
- Reference no.: 1381202

Paxtons Head is a Grade II listed public house at 153 Knightsbridge, London.

It was built in 1900–02 by George Dennis Martin as part of the Park Mansions development.
