= Parkside, Knightsbridge =

Coordinates: 51.5025°N 0.1573°W

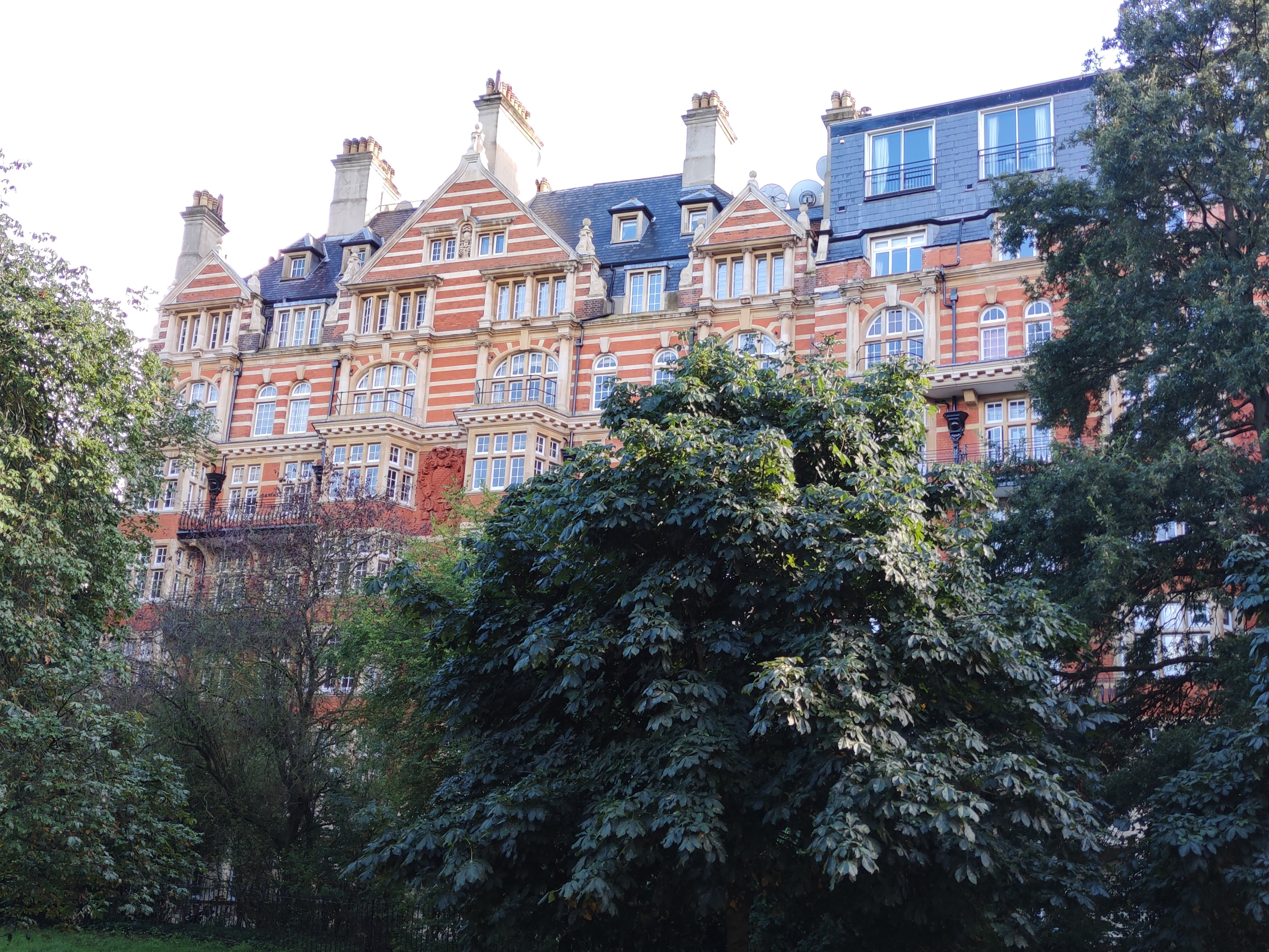
Parkside view of Parkside, as seen from South Carriage Drive.

Parkside is an Edwardian mansion block development located in the Knightsbridge area of London, named for the row of buildings that formerly occupied its site. The mansions are the first set of buildings on the north side of Knightsbridge, the road, heading west from Hyde Park Corner.

== History ==
The Parkside mansion block along with its neighbour the French Embassy, stand in a plot former occupied by a lazar house, the associated Holy Trinity chapel and the Queen's Head tavern which was demolished during the Albert Gate development in the 1840s. The buildings along this section of the road were historically also collectively known as Parkside. They included a number of shops and houses many of which were knocked down in 1904–1905 to make way for the Parkside development. The last buildings of old Parkside were demolished in the 1959 to make way for the Piccadilly or Hyde Park Corner underpass as part of the Park Lane development scheme by Cubitts and Fitzpatrick with Shand.

The development of the Parkside block followed the eastern extension of the French Embassy to its west as well as the development of a similar residential block directly opposite in 55–91 Knightsbridge. Holy Trinity was cleared in 1905 to make way for Parkside with Alfred Henry Hart and Percy Leslie Waterhouse as its architect; it would be completed in 1907.

Following its completion, the building faced challenges in letting. Edward VII complained of the excessive height of the construction, and authorities of Hyde Park did not wish to cut back tall poplars near the building, making many of the rooms of the lower floors poorly lit.

== Design ==
Parkside is built in red brick with Hartham Park stone detailing. It is of a decorated Edwardian style, with eight storeys and large gables it is described by Brooke-Hitching as "expensive and dignified".

== See also ==
- Knightsbridge
- Park Mansions
- 55–91 Knightsbridge
