= Majestic Hotel, Harrogate =

Hotel in Harrogate, North Yorkshire, England

DoubleTree by Hilton Harrogate Majestic Hotel & Spa
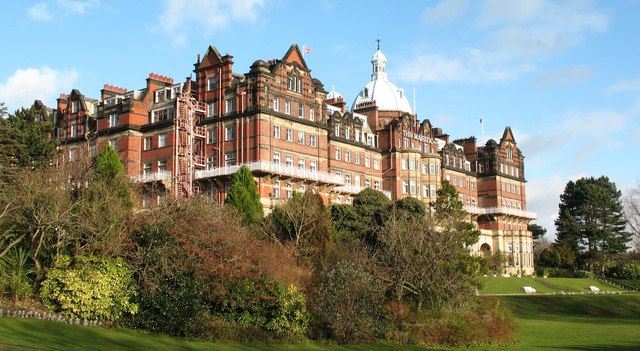
- DoubleTree by Hilton Harrogate Majestic Hotel & Spa
- Interactive map of the DoubleTree by Hilton Harrogate Majestic Hotel & Spa area
- Former names: The Majestic Hotel
- Hotel chain: DoubleTree

General information
- Status: Opened
- Type: Hotel
- Architectural style: Victorian style
- Classification: 4 stars
- Location: Ripon Road HG1 2HU, Harrogate, England
- Coordinates: 53.996833°N 1.543716°W
- Construction started: 1898
- Completed: 1900
- Opened: 18 July 1900 (The Majestic Hotel); 18 September 2019 (DoubleTree by Hilton)
- Renovated: 1998-2002; 2018-2019
- Owner: Cairn Group

Technical details
- Floor count: 5

Design and construction
- Architect: George Dennis Martin

Other information
- Number of rooms: 184
- Number of restaurants: 1
- Parking: Yes

Website
- Official website

The Majestic Hotel or Hotel Majestic, now officially known as the DoubleTree by Hilton Harrogate Majestic Hotel & Spa, is a hotel in Harrogate, North Yorkshire, England.

== History ==
The hotel was designed by the architect George Dennis Martin and built by the Frederick Hotels Limited (which owned the Hotel Great Central and Wharncliffe Restaurant, London, the Hotel Russell, London, the Royal Pavilion Hotel, Folkestone, the Hotel Burlington in Dover Bay, the Sackville Hotel, Bexhill-on-Sea and the Hotel Metropole, Whitby). It opened on 18 July 1900.

In the years before the First World War, the hotel was frequented by many celebrities, politicians and royalties. Prince Henry of Prussia stayed in The Majestic Hotel while organising an Anglo-German car rally in Yorkshire, accompanied by the Maharajah of Patiala who was also a guest, as were a number of Russian grand duchesses.

On 21 June 1924 the hotel was badly damaged in a fire. The top two storeys of the west wing were destroyed, the rooms on the same level along the south front of the main building were damaged, and the dome was destroyed. A French maid became distressed after being trapped on the roof, and a local waiter went onto the roof to prevent her from jumping. She was eventually lowered down, and rescued, by the fire brigade.

In 2010 a fire at the hotel caused significant damage, including water damage. One person died in the fire.

In 2016 the hotel was purchased by the Cairn Group and it was rebranded to DoubleTree by Hilton Harrogate Majestic Hotel & Spa on 18 September 2019 following a £15 million renovation programme that took 18 months to be completed.

== Information ==
It has 184 rooms. During the refurbishment, redevelopment of its former leisure club took place transforming it into The Harrogate Spa. The hotel has one restaurant and one piano lounge.

== Gallery ==
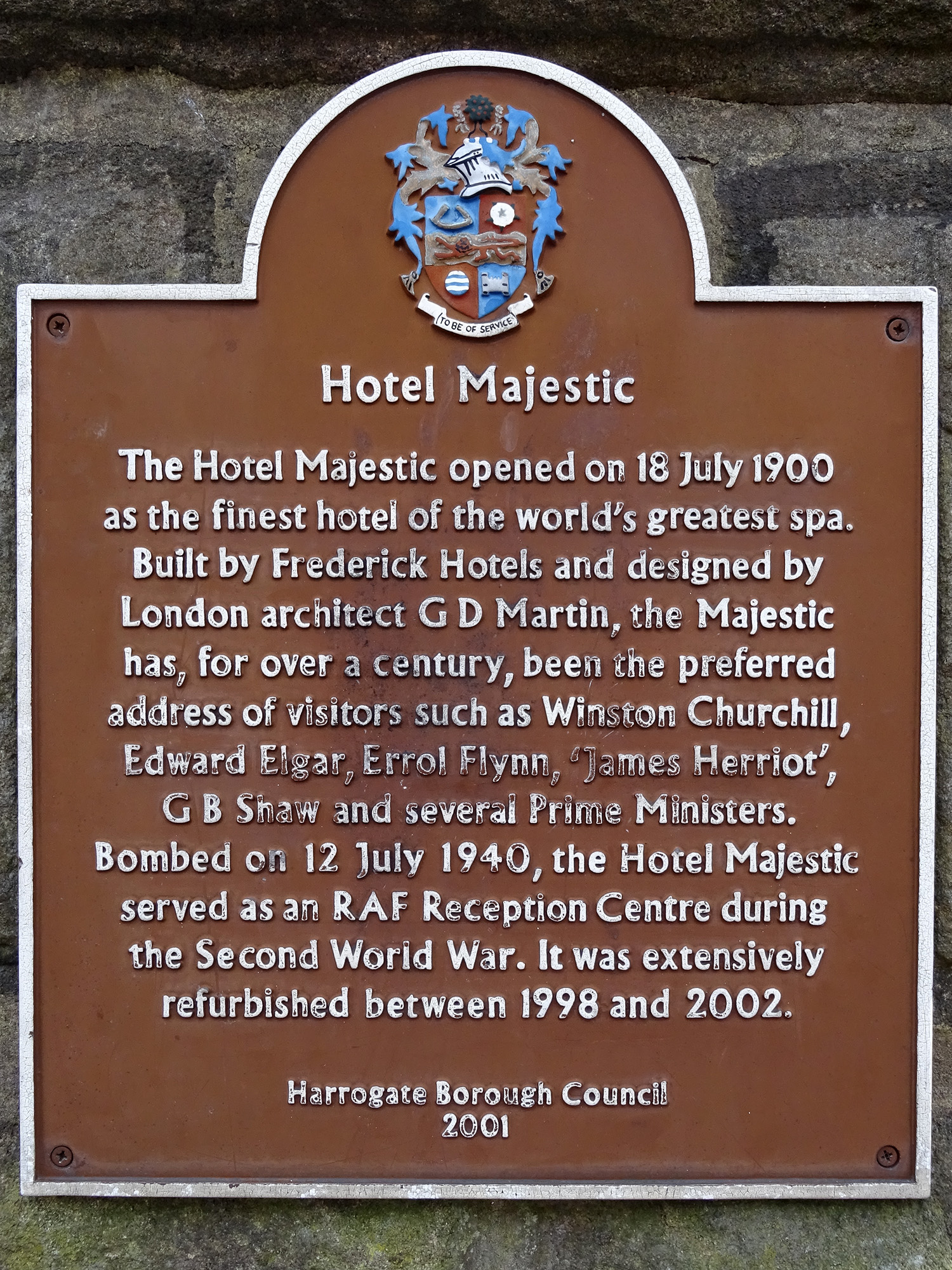

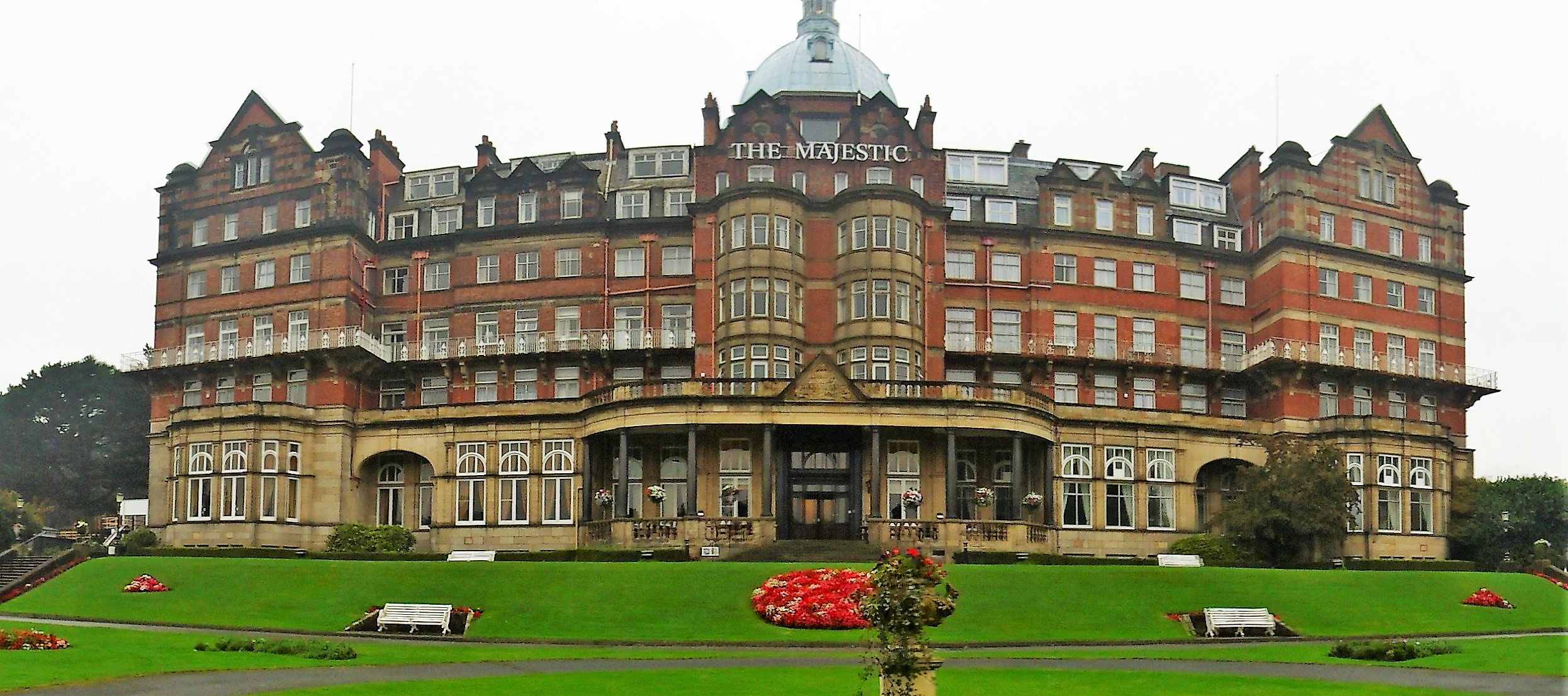

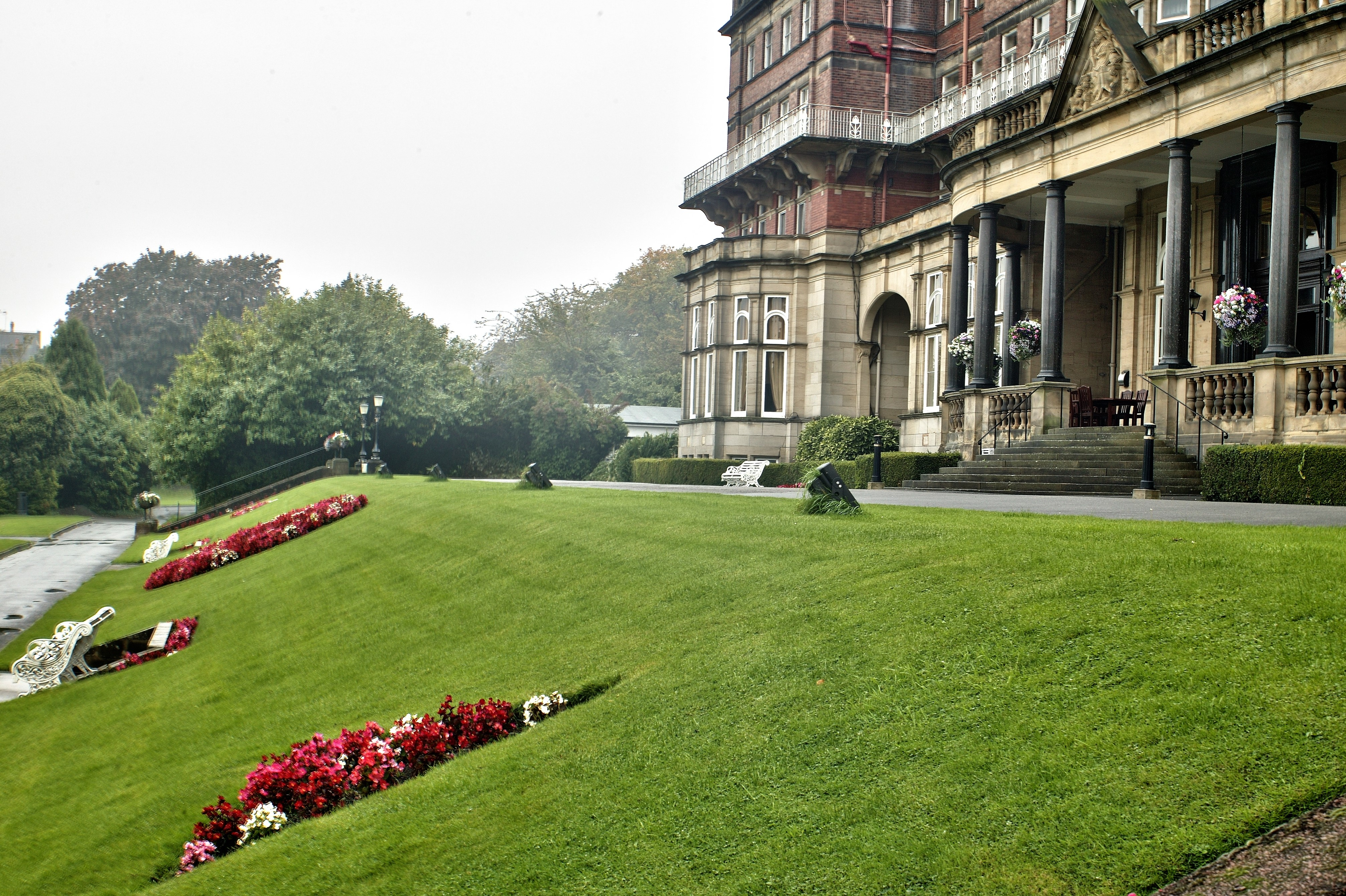

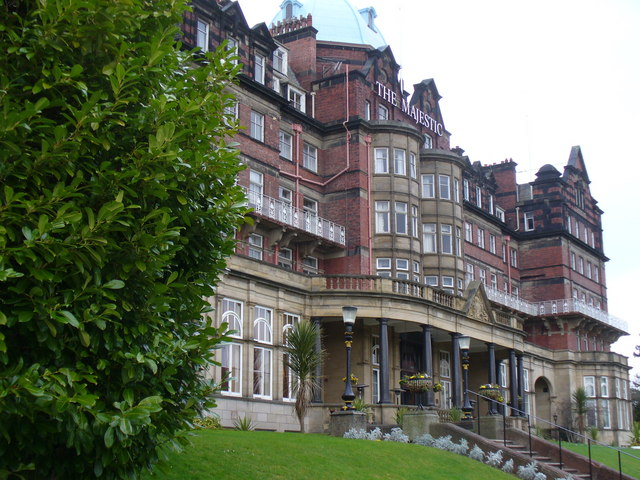

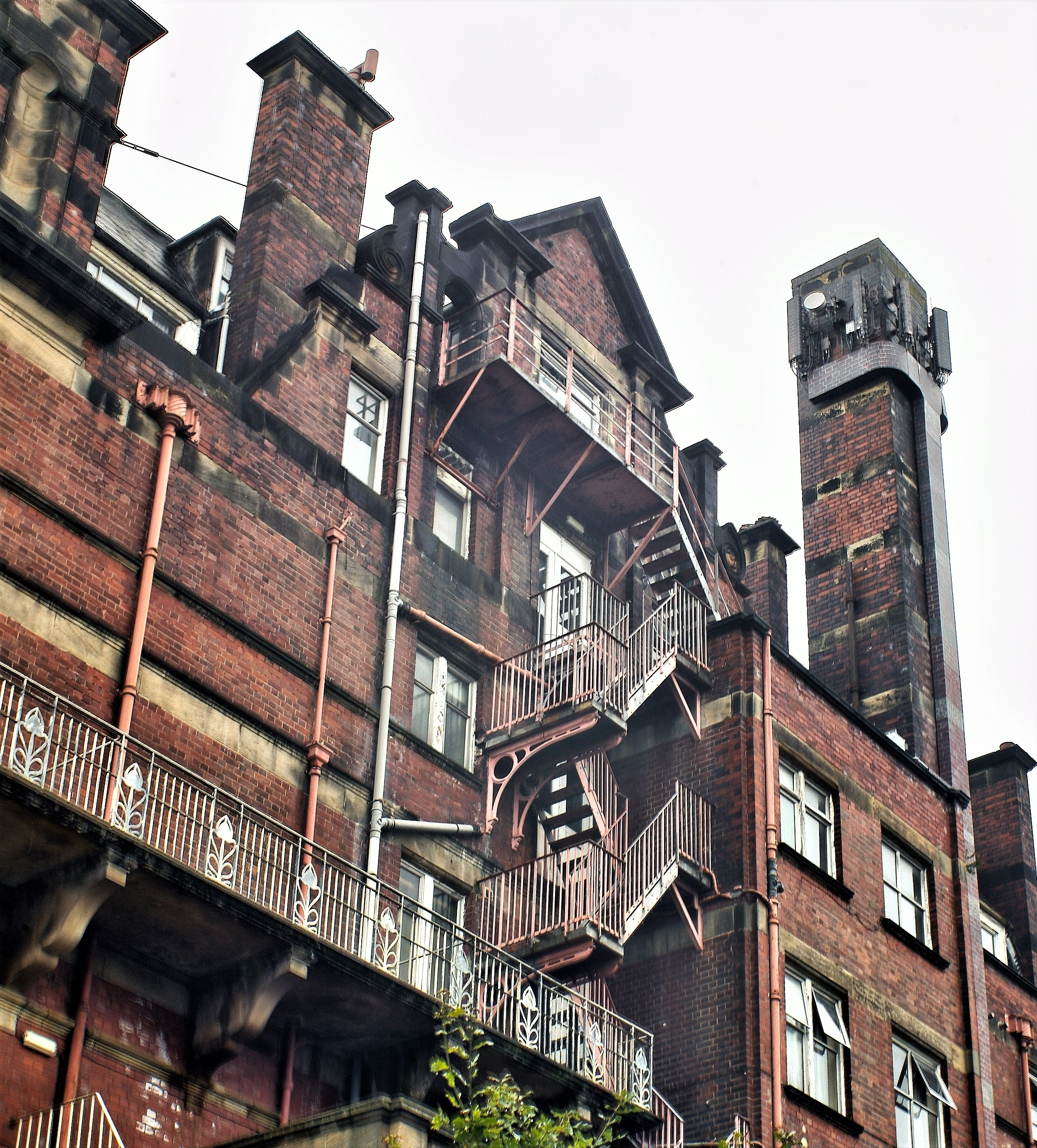
