= Black History for Action =

Lecture and discussion forum in the UK

In politics and history the Black History for Action (BHA), founded in 1986, became a long-standing and highly regarded independent lecture and discussion forum for the British African-Caribbean community in London.

== Nature and purpose ==
Notable speakers have included the Jamaican academic Dr. Richard Hart, Maria Florez, the Cuban ambassador to Britain, representatives of the South African African National Congress and Pan-African Congress, and the Florida human-rights activist Omali Yeshitela.

Lecture topics have included: "200 years since the Haitian Revolution" (1991 season); "Black Women and the Garvey Movement" (1988 season) and "Harriet Tubman" (1990 season). Each lecture was followed by a public debate.

The purpose of the forum was to stimulate debate, learning and public interest in Pan-African history and politics in an atmosphere of academic and political freedom.

== Location ==
BHA was held fortnightly (then monthly), primarily in Brixton, but also in other London locations including Lewisham and Hackney. The main venues were St Matthew (the Church of England's large chapel in the centre of Brixton), as well as Brixton Town Hall (the seat of government for the London Borough of Lambeth).

== Organisation ==
Black History for Action was organised by an independent, secular management committee of invited community volunteers, prominent amongst whom was the late Afruika Bantu (formerly known as Annette Blair). The BHA's guiding principle was that, as an independent organisation, it ought not be subject to financial or political interference by corporate or government funding agencies.

However, despite its financial independence, entrance to BHA was free. Voluntary contributions were used to pay for publicity materials and venue hire. Speakers and volunteers were not paid. Meetings were advertised in free listings sections of The Voice and The Caribbean Times newspapers.

In 1987 BHA lecture facilities were greatly improved by the incorporation of a free creche. This service was provided by volunteers (who were vetted and trained by the management committee). The experience of running the creche led the management committee to form a Saturday School (now known as the Afruika Bantu Saturday School, in recognition of the late community activist).

Meetings also served as a small distribution outlet for pan-African history books and pamphlets such as Walter Rodney's How Europe Underdeveloped Africa, Malcolm X's On Afro-American History and Richard Hart's Black Jamaican's Struggle Against Slavery.
