= Spaghetti House (restaurant chain) =

Former chain of Italian restaurants in the United Kingdom

Coordinates: 51.5198°N 0.1344°W

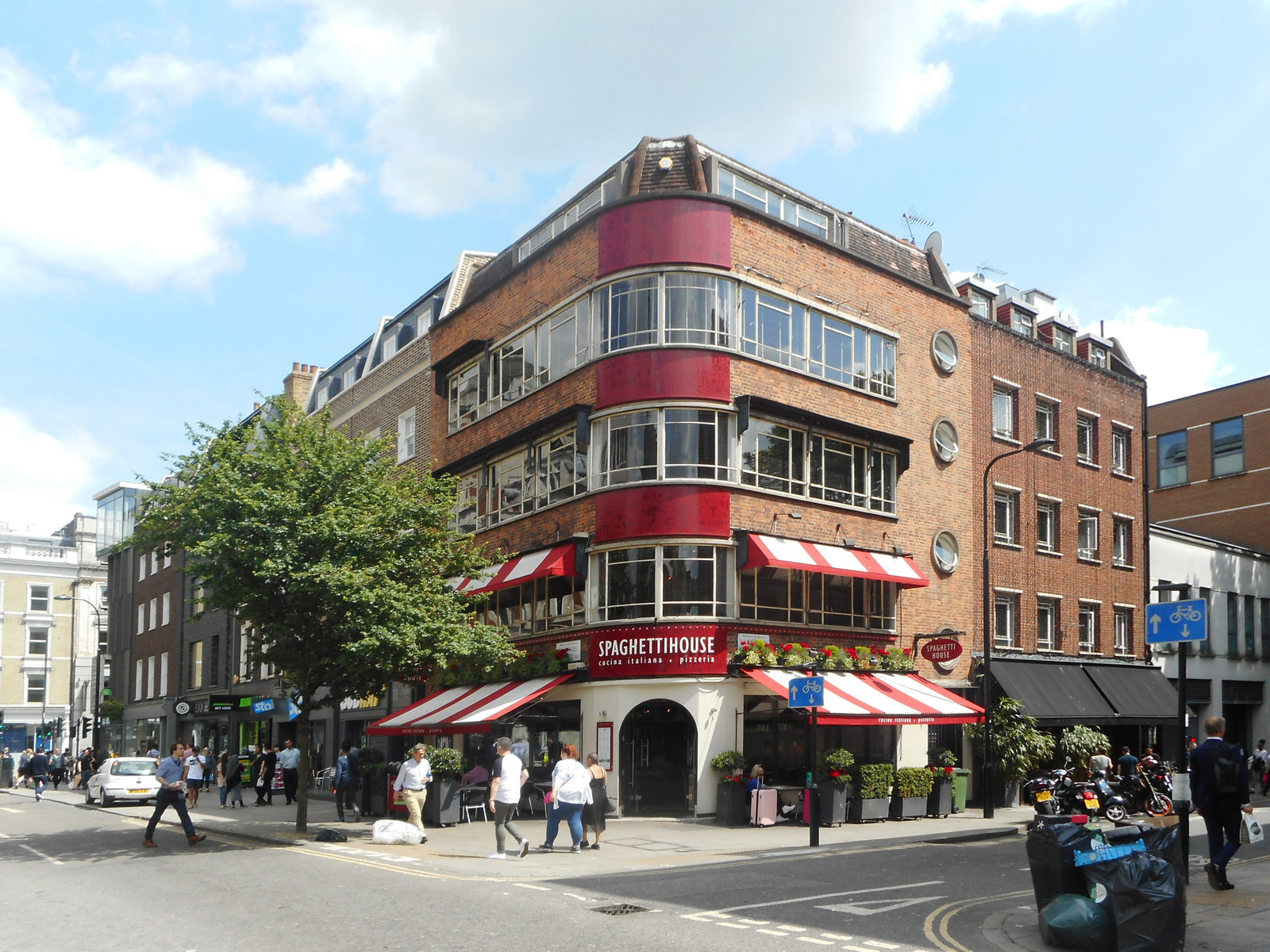
- The Spaghetti House in Goodge Street, 2017
- Interactive map of Spaghetti House

Restaurant information
- Established: 1955
- Closed: 2026
- Owner: Lavarini family
- Food type: Italian
- Website: www.spaghettihouse.co.uk

Spaghetti House was a chain of family-run Italian restaurants in the United Kingdom. The first Spaghetti House restaurant was opened in London by Simone Lavarini and Lorenzo Fraquelli in 1955.

== History ==
Spaghetti House was founded in Goodge Street, London, in 1955 by Simone Lavarini and Lorenzo Fraquelli. The chain marketed itself as serving authentic Italian pasta dishes at a time when Italian cuisine was still relatively unfamiliar in Britain, using the slogan "Spaghetti, but not on toast".

The company expanded during the 1960s and 1970s within London, opening a second restaurant in Sicilian Avenue in 1969, followed by locations in Oxford Street, Victoria, Knightsbridge and Cranbourn Street.

The Spaghetti House branch in Knightsbridge became famous in 1975 as the site of the Spaghetti House siege, where three robbers took the restaurant staff hostage following a failed robbery. The siege ended five days later with the release of all hostages.

By the 1980s, Spaghetti House products were also being sold through retailers including Harrods and Fortnum & Mason.

As of 2025, the company was owned by Lavval Restaurant Group, controlled by the Lavarini family.

In May 2026, Lavval Restaurants entered administration and Spaghetti House closed its five remaining restaurants in London, located at Marble Arch, Carnaby Street, Oxford Street, Kensington High Street and Cranbourn Street.
