= Park Mansions =

Mansion block development in London

Coordinates: 51.501343°N 0.161680°W

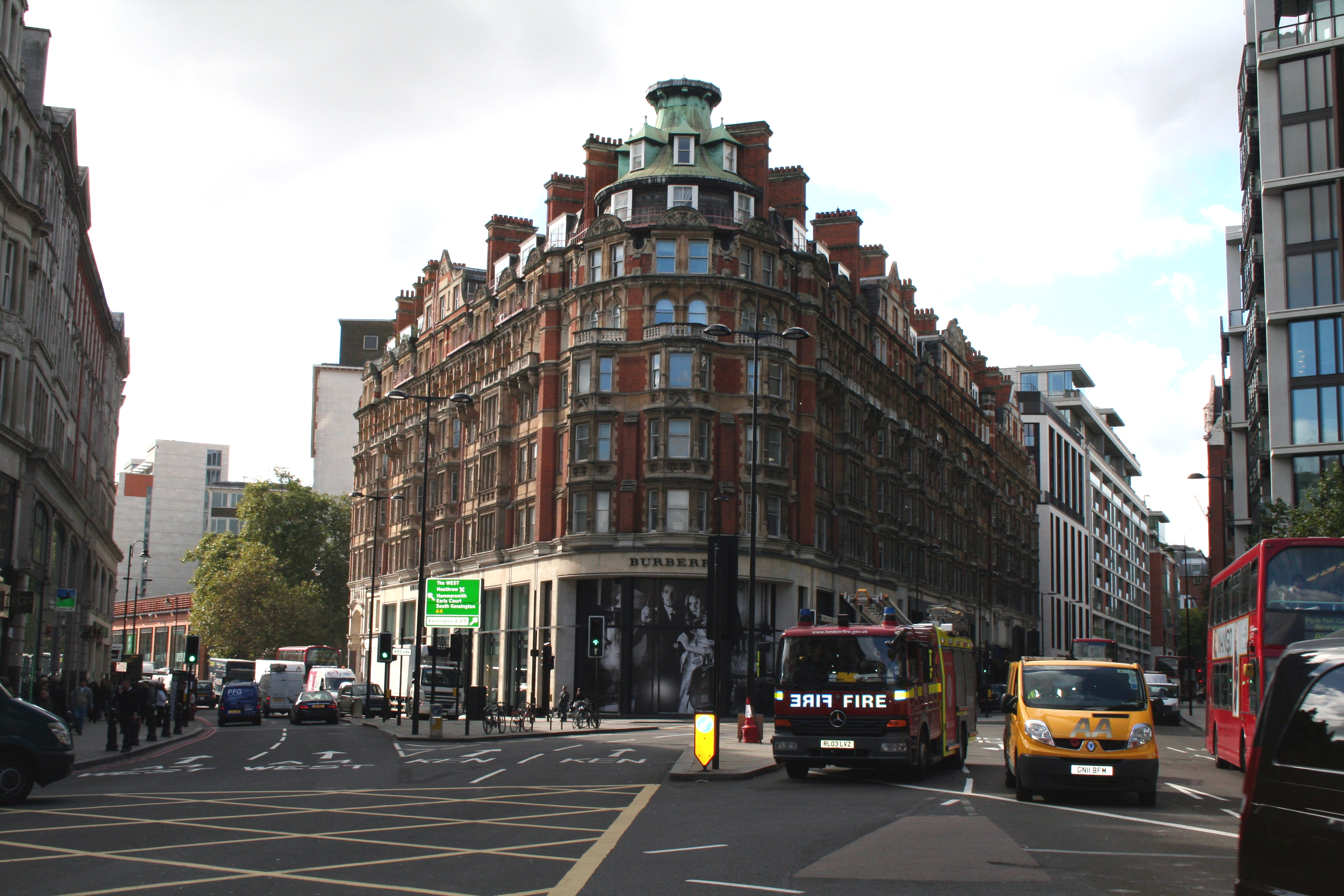
Park Mansions

Park Mansions is a mansion block development located in the Knightsbridge area of London. The mansions occupy a prominent plot on the junction of Scotch Corner where Knightsbridge road meets Brompton Road.

== History ==
The site occupied by Park Mansions was once Knightsbridge's village green, whose name survives in the narrow street to the west of the plot. The green was said to have been used as a plague pit. Plans to develop the land into a terminus for the Great Western Railway were raised in 1850 but later abandoned.

Mansion blocks were characteristic of the development of Knightsbridge from the late Victorian period, with the style being fashionable for removing the need for household staff. Park Mansions itself was built between 1897 and 1902 to the design of architect George Dennis Martin.

== Design ==
Park mansions was noted upon completion for the dichotomy of the robust upper floors and the slender supports of the ground level, a design chosen to allow for the concessions of retail space. The upper levels are of red brick with granite pilasters and Bath stone detailing with the shopfronts using large amounts of glass. Percy A. Johnson wrote of it in the Pall Mall Gazette:

"Where there should be stone, there is glass; where strength is expected, there is weakness, where lightness, an overpowering weight … The feeling of insecurity is paramount; it is as if a mammoth were seen to be reposing on cucumber-frames."

The designs also included the Park Mansions Arcade, closed in 1990, as well as a rebuilt Paxtons Head public house in the northwast corner. The tenants Scotch House, a clothing store, gave their name to the Scotch Corner junction.

== See also ==
- Scotch Corner (Knightsbridge)
- Knightsbridge
- Brompton Road
- Parkside
