= Black Liberation Front =

Black liberation organisation in the UK

- Emblem used on BLF publications
- Abbreviation: BLF
- Formation: 1971; 55 years ago
- Founded at: London, England
- Dissolved: 1993; 33 years ago
- Type: Black power organisation
- Headquarters: 61 Golborne Road (until 1986), 71 Golborne Road, London W10
- Region served: United Kingdom
- Affiliations: Grassroots Newspaper; Fasimbas; Ujima Housing Association

The Black Liberation Front (BLF) was a Black nationalist, Pan-African and African socialist organisation in the United Kingdom, operating from 1971 to 1993. It was considered one of the most effective Black power organisations in the UK, and was subjected to threats and attacks from the National Front, attacks in the media, harassment from the police, and state surveillance. It was involved in supplementary schools, affordable housing, support for prisoners, and community bookshops, primarily in London.

More secretive than the British Black Panthers, most of their members remained anonymous. Tony Soares is known as one of the founders. Other known members include Joan Anim-Addo, Jackie Daniel, Lennox Drayton, Terry Rocque, N N A Pepukayi, Desrie Thomson-George, Winston Trew, Tee White and Ansel Wong. Similar to other Black British political groups of the time, but unlike their American counterparts, the BLF embraced political Blackness – representing people of African, Asian and Caribbean heritage.

The BLF had links with Pan-African groups worldwide, often sending money to Africa, and helped organize African Liberation Day celebrations in the 1970s and 1980s. BLF ran street stalls to sell books and posters, including one on Acklam Road, near Westway, North Kensington. They also published the Grassroots Newspaper, which often featured creative work alongside news on anticolonial movements back in Africa and the Caribbean.

== History ==
BLF emerged from the North and West London branches of the British Black Panthers Movement (BBPM) in early 1971. These former BLF members intended to move away from BBPM's rigid Marxist-Leninism towards a general focus on Black working-class concerns, drawing some inspiration from Black cultural nationalism. Tony Soares, who had previously been a part of the BBPM's North London branch, said the Panthers had become "infiltrated by the Marxist and Trotskyite groups" which ordinary people wouldn't relate to. He had previously published a transcription of a Stokely Carmichael speech as the Afro-Asian Liberation Front in London in 1967, and would later help the North London branch of BBPM become the Black Liberation Front. Rather than revolution in Britain, the BLF focussed on "survival for Black people in Britain and socialism in their homelands".

In April 1971, shortly after forming, the BLF held a rally in Methodist Central Hall, Westminster with the BBPM and the Black Unity and Freedom Party (BUFP). American Panther George Jackson spoke at the event, which raised £2,000 and drew an audience of three thousand. In November 1971, American civil rights activist Robert F. Williams wrote to Soares for support, asking the BLF to protest against his extradition from Ann Arbor, Michigan, to North Carolina. The BLF protested outside the US embassy to raise international awareness of the situation, although Williams was eventually extradited in 1975.

In 1972, the Fasimbas (lit. 'Young Lions') merged into the BLF. Founded in 1970, the Fasimbas were originally the youth wing of the South East London Parents' Organisation (SELPO), and offered supplemental education, self-defence classes, and performing arts for young Black people.

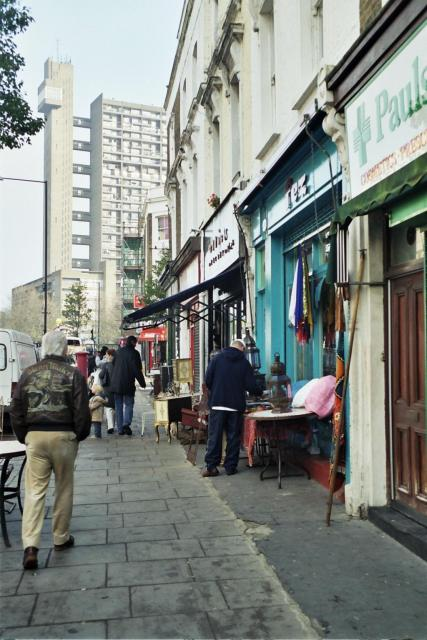
71 Golborne Road (second on the right), the headquarters of the BLF from 1986

The BLF was based at 61 Golborne Road until 1986, when it moved to 71 Golborne Road. The Golborne Road site included a shopfront for the BLF's newspaper Grassroots.

== Education ==
BLF was especially concerned with educational inequalities in the UK. Because Black-authored books were extremely difficult to source in London at the time, the BLF established three book shops filled with Black history, Black politics and Black literature. The Grassroots Storefront on Ladbroke Grove was one of these bookshops, and became a community hub. The Operation Headstart bookshop provided information for young people and at the weekends, volunteers ran maths, English and Black history classes there. It had a sister organisation for young people called the Fasimbas.

== Grassroots ==
Grassroots: Black Community News (sometimes styled Grass Roots) was the BLF's newspaper. It ran from 1978–1986, and was available in cities across the UK.

== Welfare and housing schemes ==
BLF ran prisoner welfare schemes, and schemes to support Black women. In 1977, Ujima Housing Association was established by the BLF to address issues around discrimination in housing, focussing especially on young people and mothers. In 1988, Ujima opened a refuge for Black women fleeing domestic violence. By 2008, when Ujima was merged into London and Quadrant, its assets were valued at £2 billion.

== Legacy ==
The group was the focus of the Heritage Lottery-funded project Black Political Activism in Britain - The Black Liberation Front (BLF) 1971-1994 and Steve McQueen's Small Axe.
