= Jackie Daniel =

British NHS administrator

Dame Jacqueline Lesley Daniel, normally known as Jackie Daniel, is a British health care administrator and NHS manager.

She started her career as a nurse and has been Chief Executive at

- Manchester Mental Health and Social Care Trust
- Robert Jones and Agnes Hunt Orthopaedic Hospital NHS Foundation Trust.
- University Hospitals of Morecambe Bay NHS Foundation Trust, where she is credited with helping it to recover from a high-profile maternity care scandal
- Newcastle upon Tyne Hospitals NHS Foundation Trust from March 2018 until 2023.

Daniel has a master's degree in Quality Assurance in Health and Social Care, and she is a qualified business and personal coach. She was created a Dame Commander of the Order of the British Empire in the 2018 New Year Honours

Daniel's total benefits including salary (for 2019/20) received from the Newcastle Upon Tyne Hospitals NHS Foundation Trust was in the band £280-285k.

In April 2022 she was appointed vice-chair of the NHS Confederation.

She was one of the founders, and the initial join vice chair, of the Dames Commander Society, which was launched in 2024.
