= Black Unity and Freedom Party =

Defunct Black British political movement 1970-1999

- Abbreviation: BUFP
- Successor: African People's Liberation Organisation (APLO)
- Formation: July 26, 1970; 56 years ago
- Dissolved: 1999; 27 years ago
- Type: Black power organisation
- Region served: United Kingdom

In politics and history the Black Unity and Freedom Party (BUFP) (c. 1970 – 1999) was a political organisation that was part of Britain's Black Power and Radical left movements.

== Birth ==
The BUFP held its first congress in London on 26 July 1970, "being the commemorative day of the Cuban Revolution". Alrick (Ricky) Xavier Cambridge, George Joseph, Danny Morrell and Sonia Chang, among others, were involved in its foundation. In its early years the organisation had three branches, two in London and one in Manchester.

== Outlook ==
At the outset the BUFP used its official journal, Black Voice, to proclaim its ideology to be "Marxism-Leninism". In 1990 it revised this to "Marxism-Leninism-Mao-Tsetung thought" and in 1997 changed it again to "Scientific Socialism".

== Background ==
By 1970, migration to Britain from the country's former colonies in the Caribbean, West Africa and South Asia had led to substantial communities in its major cities, particularly London, Birmingham, Manchester, Liverpool, Bristol and Cardiff. However, there was significant opposition to black settlement, stemming from the racist attitudes by the white majority. Foremost among such opposition was the Member of Parliament for Wolverhampton, Enoch Powell. In addition, far-right organisations such as the National Front and a perception of racism in the ranks of the police and other institutions contributed to an atmosphere of social conflict.

As a result, activists established a variety of independent organisations to represent the settler communities. Among these were the West Indian Standing Conference, the Campaign Against Racial Discrimination and the Universal Coloured People's Association. Of strong importance to this process was the influence of American civil rights and black power figures such as Stokely Carmichael (a.k.a. Kwame Ture), Malcolm X and Martin Luther King Jr., each of whom visited and spoke at public meetings in Britain.

America's Black Panther Party was also an influence, and although other activists such as Michael X formed a British organisation called the Black Panther Party, the programme and activities of the BUFP reflected much of the combination of militant Black Nationalism and far-left Marxism of Huey P. Newton's organisation of Oakland, UK. However, in the British context (such as an unarmed police force) there was no impetus for armed militants to shadow them.

== Black Voice ==
Black Voice Vol. 19, No.3, published 1988

Throughout its 30-year history, the BUFP published its journal Black Voice. This was printed in the form of a tabloid newspaper with pictures and articles documenting British and international political developments from a party perspective. In 1995 they changed the paper to A4 format.

Black Voice was heavily critical of British and US government policies, whether Labour or Conservative, Republican or Democrat. The editorial line took a radical anti-capitalist, anti-racist and pro-socialist stance on every issue. While the organisation did not permit "white" membership (on the grounds of "black self-determination"), Black Voice always carried in its programme the "internationalist" assertion that "contradiction'" between the working classes of all ethnic groups and capitalism was paramount, outweighing the contradictions between workers of different ethnic groups. In other words, it envisaged anti-capitalist unity between "black" and "white" workers.

A typical issue throughout the 1970s and 1980s might contain an article about violent incidents between the British police and African-Caribbean or Asian residents, often referred to as "police brutality". In addition there would be pieces about the apartheid regime in South Africa and party analyses of various controversies such as the education of African-Caribbean children in British schools. For several years in the early 1980s, the party published articles by the American Professor Manning Marable under the banner "Across the Colour Line".

The journal was published in editions of up to 24 pages with print runs of up to 2,000 between one and four times a year (although it was initially intended to be a monthly journal). However, in the late 1990s print runs were reduced to as little as 500 copies, appearing once or twice a year. The main avenue of distribution was BUFP members standing on city street corners and engaging (usually black) citizens in conversation. Some editions were placed in left-wing or black-owned bookshops, such as the Index Book Centre and the Black Cultural Archives, both situated in Brixton, south London. There were also regular postal subscribers both in the UK and internationally, from as far afield as Australia and India.

Contributors, editors, page production workers and sales workers were all unpaid. Print was purchased at commercial rates from sympathetic printers. Participation in street paper sales was considered to be an unpaid duty of party membership.

== General activities ==
As well as publishing Black Voice, BUFP activities constituted the following:

- Protest and information campaigns.

Including the Broadwater Farm Defence Campaign and the Tottenham 3 Are Innocent Campaign, formed in the wake of the 1985 civil conflict between residents of Tottenham and the Metropolitan Police.

- Public lecture and discussion forums.

Guest speakers included the Jamaican academic and activist Dr. Richard Hart, Maria Florez, the Cuban ambassador to Britain, representatives of South Africa's African National Congress and Pan-African Congress, as well as the Florida activist Omali Yeshitela. They also set up "Black History for Action", which organised meetings for the Black community to discuss its history, culture, conditions and "most importantly, the way forward".

- Internal meetings and discussions.

Internally, the party had a democratic structure, regularly electing officials to carry out tasks such as Treasurer, Black Voice editor and General Secretary. Members were required to participate in internal political education classes, as well as internal democracy.

- Fundraising.

The BUFP was never a wealthy organisation, and did very little serious fundraising. It therefore lacked capital to invest in activities such as publishing. As well as street sales of Black Voice, the organisation relied on membership contributions and collections at its public meetings. It never paid its officials or members.

- Inter-organisational relations ("broad fronts").

The party spent much of its energy participating in common activities with other organisations. These included the yearly organisation of African Liberation Day celebrations in collaboration with the Black Liberation Front, a similarly small organisation based in the Grassroots bookshop in London's Ladbroke Grove area. In the 1995, the organisation joined with the cultural nationalist group, the Pan-African Congress Movement, the All-African Peoples Revolutionary Party (founded by Kwame Ture), the "Kwame Nkrumah Convention People's Party" and the "Movement for African People's Unity" to establish the "African United Action Front" with a view to joint activities. The organisation also gave initial support to Omali Yeshitela's call for establishing an African Socialist International to coordinate black revolutionary activities across the world.

The Black Unity and Freedom Party never stood candidates in official British state elections. During the 1987 and 1992 UK national election campaigns, the Black Voice ran editorials urging the black community to boycott the elections, claiming that they merely served to "legitimise the capitalist state".

== Membership ==
Even during its heyday in the early 1970s the BUFP was an extremely small organisation, never having more than about fifty paid-up members. For most of its history membership fluctuated between about 10 to 15. Its low point was in 1983, when following a split, it dwindled to just three regular members for a few months. However, its members were always very highly motivated, studious and committed activists.

Members were particularly visible in support of public black community protest campaigns and demonstrations involving alleged 'police brutality' and other allegations of "racially motivated" violence such as the New Cross Fire march in 1981. Therefore, anyone attending community demonstrations in support of, for example, Cherry Groce (shot by police), Joy Gardner (died during a violent deportation) or Colin Roach (shot inside a police station) would certainly hear a BUFP member lecturing the assembled crowd about the ills of capitalism and its links to racism through a megaphone.

The Black Panthers (named after America's Black Panther Party), which was in origins and programme quite similar to the BUFP, had some members who achieved high public profiles in the UK, such as Darcus Howe and Tariq Ali. Howe, who eventually became a controversial television raconteur and presenter married one of the BUFP's early leaders, Leila Hassan. By 1995, the BUFP regarded Howe as a "sellout", complaining that he used his TV programme Devil's Advocate to promote white racists, that he depicted Black men as violent and that he had forgotten his roots when he declared "I have no nation or country" in an interview in the newspaper The Guardian (20 March 1995). No BUFP member ever achieved any significant public profile during its lifetime.

Indeed, anonymity played a fairly constant role in the organisation's activities. Perhaps surprisingly, most of the membership, although often of labouring class origins, were employed either as professionals - such as teachers, doctors or accountants – or as minor local authority officials. Therefore, in order to protect their membership of a far-left, radical organisation becoming known, some members would either adopt pseudonyms when addressing public meetings, such as "Lumumba" – or just use their first name, such as "Sister Annette", etc. This was also true of Black Voice articles, most of which were published anonymously.

However, one member did achieve a small amount of posthumous recognition. Afruika Bantu (formerly Annette Blair), whose membership lasted more or less continuously (with occasionally breaks) from the mid-1970s until her death in 2000, was honoured in the renaming of the Tulse Hill weekend school (established 1999) to the Afruika Bantu Saturday School, a small education project based in the Tulse Hill district of south London.

However, probably the most familiar member, at least to other activists among London's African-Caribbean fringe political groups was Minkah Adofoh, who had joined the organisation in the late 1970s and, after 20 years of continuous BUFP activism, became one of the founding members of the group's "political descendant", the APLO.

== Decline and dissolution ==
Despite various initiatives aimed at "rebuilding the black movement", the organisation was, by the mid-1990s, more of a marginal fringe group than it had been in 1970.

Membership hovered at around the ten-person mark, public meeting attendance was around 30 to 50 and Black Voice sales were down to about 1,000 a year. A radical revision aimed to create a new body with more appeal to the African-Caribbean youths who had grown up in a post-apartheid, post-colonial and post-Soviet political climate.

In 1998, after two years of internal discussion and public consultation, BUFP members, along with several members of the public launched the African People's Liberation Organisation (APLO). The APLO was far more Afro-centric in its rhetoric and programme. Unlike the BUFP, it did not admit Asians and labelled itself as "Scientific Socialist" rather than refer to the European theorists Karl Marx and Vladimir Lenin. In addition, the lack of the word "party" in its title was deemed to be of crucial significance - signalling a potential retreat from outright battles in the political arena. A few months later the BUFP convened for the last time and formally transferred all of their collective assets to the new organisation, before permanently adjourning their last General Meeting.

== Bibliography ==
- Vince Hines, How Black Power Overcame Fifty Years of Oppression in Britain 1945-1995 (Volume One: 1945-1975), Zulu Books, 1998.
- Professor Harry Goldbourne, Africa and the Caribbean in Caribbean consciousness and action in Britain, David Nicholls Memorial Trust, 2000. ISSN 1740-1577
- A. Sivanandan., Racism in the Age of Globalisation, Independent Race and Refugee News Network, 2004.
