= Marina Salandy-Brown =

Trinidadian journalist, broadcaster and cultural activist

Marina Salandy-Brown FRSA, Hon. FRSL
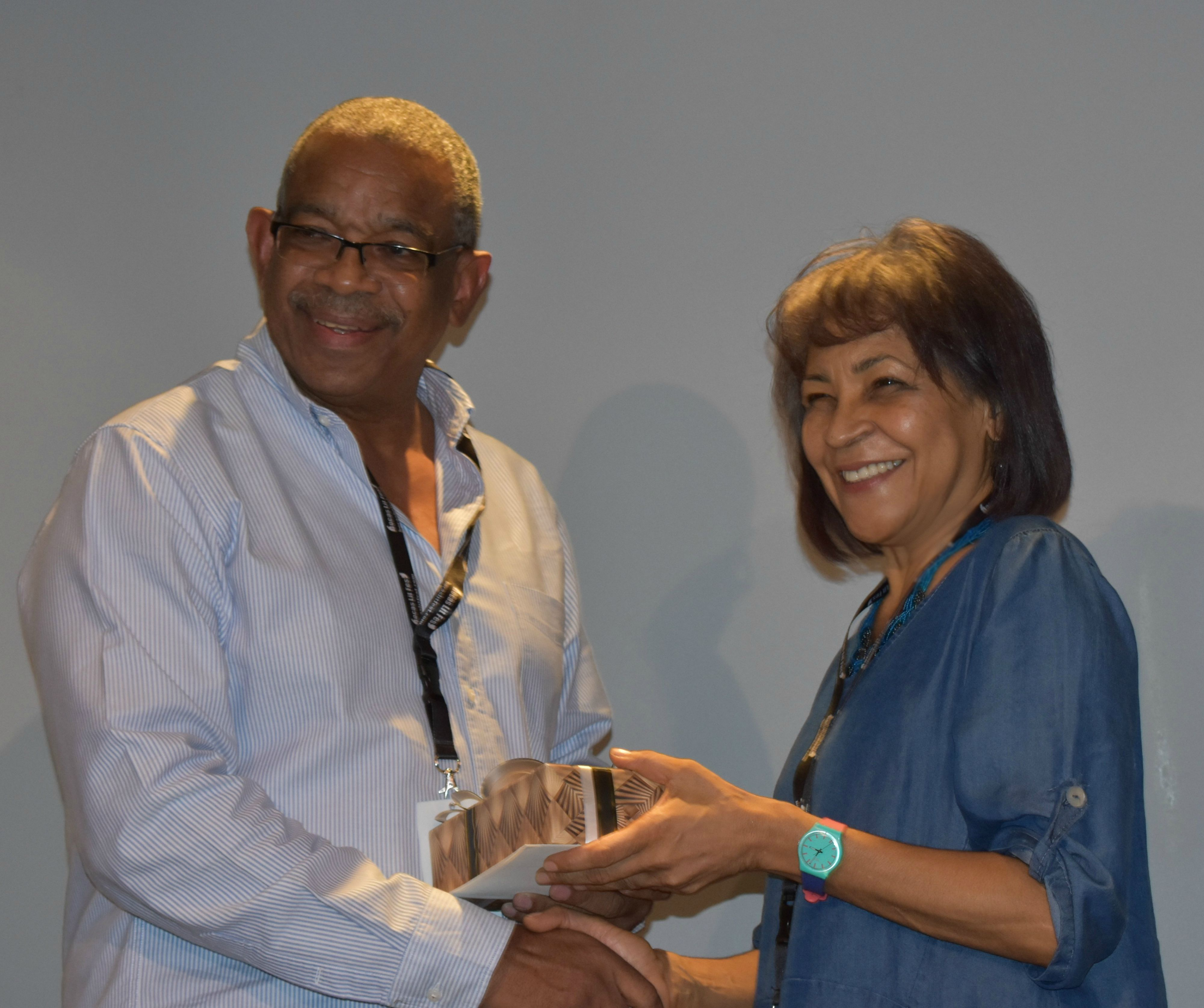
- Salandy-Brown presents the 2019 Henry Swanzy Award to Ian Randle at the NGC Bocas Lit Fest
- Born: Marina Salandy; Diego Martin, Trinidad
- Occupations: Journalist, broadcaster and cultural activist
- Known for: Founder of NGC Bocas Lit Fest
- Awards: Hummingbird Medal (silver)

Marina Salandy-Brown FRSA Hon. FRSL is a Trinidadian journalist, broadcaster and cultural activist. She is the founder and inaugural director of the NGC Bocas Lit Fest, an annual literary festival held in Trinidad and Tobago since 2011, and of the OCM Bocas Prize for Caribbean Literature.

She previously served as an editor and senior manager of news and current affairs programmes for the British Broadcasting Corporation (BBC) in London, where she was one of few executives from an ethnic minority background. She is the co-founder of the Hollick Arvon Caribbean Writers Prize.

Salandy-Brown was awarded honorary doctorates from the University of Westminster in 2005 and the University of the West Indies in 2013. In 2020, received the Ferdinand Magellan Award from Chile and was elected as an honorary Fellow of the United Kingdom's Royal Society of Literature. In 2022, she was awarded the Hummingbird Medal at the National Awards Ceremony in Port of Spain, Trinidad. In 2025, she was honoured with the national award of Spain, the Officer's Cross of the Order of Civil Merit.

== Early life ==
Born Marina Salandy in Diego Martin, Trinidad, she has stated that "all Salandys apparently started [in Diego Martin], but I come from everywhere in Trinidad." Her father ran experimental agricultural stations for the government, and her family lived in various rural locations across the island. Her family lived in Maracas-Saint Joseph, where "you had to go down into the river five times before getting to our house at the end of the road", and Matelot, where "the road wasn't properly paved."

She later attended the government secondary school in Diego Martin.

== Career ==
=== United Kingdom and the BBC ===
Salandy-Brown left Trinidad at the age of 17 to attend university in the United Kingdom. She began her career in London as an editor with Melrose Press, and later became an editor and senior manager of news and current affairs programmes for BBC Radio, where she worked for 20 years.

Among the programmes produced by Salandy-Brown for the BBC was BBC Radio 4's Start the Week, presented by Melvyn Bragg. Bragg recalled the beginning of their successful long-term collaboration: "I met this producer Marina Salandy-Brown and neither she nor I wanted to go on doing the same Start the Week. I remember we had lunch together – and I said, 'Well, if I'm going to go on I want to do this sort of stuff,' And she said, 'So do I' – or she said it first and I agreed…. And then we just conscientiously, steadily put that into operation and changed the programme." In the new styling of the programme, "The producer, Marina Salandy-Brown, and I introduced scientists, historians and philosophers on to that Monday morning slot, and changed the nature of the programme. A change which I am glad that my successor Jeremy Paxman and his successor Andrew Marr have kept."

Other programmes Salandy-Brown produced for BBC Radio 4 included the series Work Talk (1991–92), presented by Ferdinand Dennis, and Book at Bedtime, a 1993 edition featuring Lawrence Scott's novel Witchbroom, abridged by Margaret Busby.

In the early 1980s, Salandy-Brown was involved with the Black Media Workers' Association (BMWA), a pressure group for better training and employment opportunities for black workers in the mainstream press and broadcasting, and in 1982 she conducted research that was the basis for the BMWA report Black Workers in the Media.

As Home Editor of BBC Radio 5 Live, Salandy-Brown was concerned with implementing a diversity policy, arguing in 2002 that "there is no point having diverse people if you don’t allow them to be diverse". She explained the context:

"When I joined the BBC in 1984 there were no people of colour working in radio production in the four national domestic services, except one producer from India.... On BBC TV there was one Caribbean woman news presenter, Moira Stuart.... I was determined not to be the first and last Caribbean person to be a BBC radio producer. I immediately started making programmes about people whose voices were never heard by the British public. I made programmes that promoted Caribbean and developing country cultures, politics and people.... The programmes won prizes and proved that there was a world of stories out there to be told and that all people could be included in the BBC without outraging the British public. They just had to be the very best in quality. I was able to recruit researchers and producers of non-European origin to my production teams.... I also introduced new non-European presenters and subjects to the airwaves. My success paved the way for others to follow as staff members and as presenters....And, even when the argument was won over hiring a work force that represented the population, myopic editors would often pigeon-hole non-white producers and presenters."

Salandy-Brown was a governor of the University of Westminster, a member of the Arts Council Literature panel, and a former trustee of the Koestler Awards to support and fund Arts in prisons in the UK. She is a Fellow of the Royal Society of Arts (FRSA).

=== Return to Trinidad ===
Returning to Trinidad in 2004 to be with her mother, Salandy-Brown has since 2005 contributed a weekly commentary column to the Trinidad and Tobago Newsday. Integral since 2006 in the development of the Trinidad and Tobago Film Festival, of which she was executive director for four years, she also became a consultant to the Trinidad & Tobago Film Company. She also works across the Caribbean as a media consultant.

=== Bocas Lit Fest ===
Salandy-Brown has spoken of her realisation after returning to Trinidad that locally "[t]here was no place for people who read to get together, in a forum to talk about books and there were so many Caribbean writers abroad who had not been to other islands — something was missing." As she stated in 2011: "In Britain there are a hundred and how many literary festivals. Little Dominica, which is so poor and so tiny, has a literary festival. Jamaica had one for 10 years, the Calabash. I think Antigua has one. Why didn't we have one, when we've produced so many great writers? Sam Selvon and these people really made an impact on the world stage. Earl Lovelace is treasured, but not treasured enough, because we don't have prizes. There's been no accolade of Earl's writing since the 1970s. It's important to reward creative effort! We created a literary festival but we also created an international prize for Caribbean writing."

Working with her group including Nicholas Laughlin, Funso Aiyejina, Marjorie Thorpe, and Jeremy Taylor – Salandy-Brown launched the Bocas Lit Fest in April 2011, together with the Bocas Prize for Caribbean Literature.

The Bocas Lit Fest celebrated its 10th anniversary in September 2020 with a virtual festival, necessitated by the COVID-19 pandemic.

In January 2022, Salandy-Brown announced that she was "passing on the baton" to Nicholas Laughlin to serve in the roles of festival and programme director, while she remains as president of Bocas.

== Writing ==
As well her weekly column in Newsday, Salandy-Brown has written reviews, articles and essays for other publications both in the Caribbean region and internationally, including Caribbean Beat, The Independent, and elsewhere.

She was a contributor to the book Caribbean Dispatches: Beyond the Tourist Dream (2006), compiled and edited by Jane Bryce, and, more recently, to the 2019 anthology New Daughters of Africa, edited by Margaret Busby.

== Awards and recognition ==
In 1988, Salandy-Brown won the Sony Silver Award for Most Creative Use of Radio, and 1994 she was named Radio Journalist of the Year. She also won Programme of the Year, UK Television and Radio Industries Club, in 1990, and a Sony Gold Award, Best News Programme in 2000 for BBC Radio.

In 1992, she won the New York Festivals Award, Silver.

In 2005, she was awarded an honorary doctorate (DLitt) by the University of Westminster.

In 2012, she was recognised by for her achievements in the Arts in the UK during the last 50 years with an award at the Trinidad and Tobago Independence Jubilee celebrations.

In 2013, she was among six persons to be conferred with honorary doctorates from the University of the West Indies at St Augustine, when in October the Chancellor George A. O. Alleyne presented her with the Doctor of Letters (DLitt), Honoris Causa of UWI.

In October 2020, an award was conferred on Salandy-Brown marking the 500th anniversary of Ferdinand Magellan's first circumnavigation of the world, in recognition of her work founding the Bocas Lit Fest, promoting art and literature throughout the Caribbean, and exploring other cultures. The inaugural Strait of Magellan Award was presented to her at the Bocas Lit Fest headquarters, Alcazar Street, Port of Spain, on 30 November by Ambassador of Chile Juan Aníbal Barría, who called Salandy-Brown "an explorer like Magellan, who, thanks to her discipline, work and innovation, has managed to build an educational space that crosses the frontiers of knowledge and contributes to the dissemination of the rich Caribbean culture."

Salandy-Brown was elected an Honorary Fellow of the Royal Society of Literature (RSL) in 2020, the 200th anniversary of the RSL's founding.

Alongside the Bocas Lit Fest that she founded, Salandy-Brown was celebrated by the International Women's Forum (IWF) in the "Ideas Remaking the World" segment of IWF's World Leadership Conference in November 2021.

In September 2022, she received the Trinidad national award of the Hummingbird Medal (Silver).

On behalf of the OCM Bocas Lit Fest, Salandy-Brown received the keys to the city of Port of Spain on 26 June 2025, the honour being presented by the mayor, Alderman Chinua Alleyne, for "excellence and dedication to our community".

She was also honoured with the national award of Spain, the Officer's Cross of the Order of Civil Merit, presented to her in December 2025.

== Selected articles ==
- "Beaton at his own game", Caribbean Beat, Issue 4, Winter 1992.
- "'Was strange, our sweat mixed'", The Independent, 15 September 1998.
- "Put me down whey yuh pick me up", in Jane Bryce (ed.), Caribbean Dispatches: Beyond the Tourist Dream, Macmillan Caribbean, p. 201.
- "Who tells your story?", Trinidad and Tobago Newsday, 28 July 2018.
- "The enigma of Vidia Naipaul", Trinidad and Tobago Newsday, 19 August 2018.
- "Of Africa and of India", Trinidad and Tobago Newsday, 13 April 2019.
- "Lost Daughter of Africa", in Margaret Busby (ed.), New Daughters of Africa, Myriad Editions, 2019; Hamish Hamilton/Penguin Books, 2022, ISBN 9780241997000, pp. 193–7.
- "100, with grace and style", Trinidad and Tobago Newsday, 10 October 2021.
- "The experience of life", Trinidad and Tobago Newsday, 7 April 2024.
- "How come we reach here?", Trinidad and Tobago Newsday, 11 May 2025.
