= NGC Bocas Lit Fest =

Annual literary festival in Trinidad and Tobago

- Genre: Literary
- Frequency: Annually
- Locations: Port of Spain, Trinidad and Tobago
- Founded: 2011; 15 years ago
- Founder: Marina Salandy-Brown
- People: Nicholas Laughlin (festival and programme director)
- Sponsor: National Gas Company of Trinidad and Tobago (NGC)
- Website: www.bocaslitfest.com

The NGC Bocas Lit Fest is the Trinidad and Tobago literary festival that takes place annually during the last weekend of April in Port of Spain. Inaugurated in 2011, it is the first major literary festival in the southern Caribbean and largest literary festival in the Anglophone Caribbean. A registered non-profit company, the festival has as its title sponsor the National Gas Company of Trinidad and Tobago (NGC). Other sponsors and partners include First Citizens Bank, One Caribbean Media (OCM), who sponsor the associated OCM Bocas Prize for Caribbean Literature, CODE (sponsors of the Burt Award), and the Commonwealth Foundation.

The NGC Bocas Lit Fest also works in collaboration with other international festivals and initiatives, such as the Brooklyn Caribbean Literary Festival and has hosted events showcasing Caribbean writing talent in New York, at the Brooklyn Book Fair, the Harlem Book Fair and elsewhere in the US. In 2012, Bocas partnered with the Edinburgh World Writers Conference as part of a line-up of 14 countries delivering a multinational series of talks marking the 50th anniversary of the five-day meeting of "an impressive, sensational and sometimes scandalous group of writers" at the first Edinburgh International Festival of Music and Drama. The Bocas Lit Fest was described by Claire Armitstead of The Guardian as "expansive in its cultural reach, reflecting a region that has responded to its own colonisation over the centuries by seeding its people to every continent".

== Background ==
The Bocas Lit Fest was established in 2011, with the organising team comprising Marina Salandy-Brown, founder and managing director; programme director Nicholas Laughlin, editor of the Caribbean Review of Books and of Caribbean Beat; Funso Aiyejina, prize-winning author and dean of the Faculty of Humanities and Education at the University of the West Indies, St. Augustine; Marjorie Thorpe, former professor of literature at the University of the West Indies, St. Augustine, independent bookseller Joan Dayal of Paper Based Bookshop; Danielle Delon, editor of The Letters of Margaret Mann; local businesswoman Lucita Esau; and Patrice Matthews, a marketing and media professional. In 2019, Rani Lakhan-Narace was appointed as president of the Bocas Lit Fest.

The festival's name derives from the Spanish word for mouth, boca – the organ of speech and song and storytelling – while also referencing the Bocas del Dragón (the Dragon's Mouths), which are the narrow straits off Trinidad’s north-west peninsula that connect the Gulf of Paria to the Caribbean Sea. For centuries, the Bocas were the gateways connecting Trinidad to the Caribbean and the Atlantic Ocean.

The festival's strapline is: "Celebrating books, writers, and writing from the Caribbean and the rest of the world".

The main venues are the National Library (NALIS) and the Old Fire Station, in downtown Port of Spain, with satellite evening events at venues around the city.

There is also a full programme of activities for young readers, sponsored by KFC, and in the run-up to the festival storytelling events take place in Tobago, Couva, Chaguanas, San Fernando, Point Fortin, Mayaro and Arima.

A new venture is a year-round programme of events at The Writers Centre (TWC) at Alcazar Street, Port of Spain, and the 10th anniversary celebrations of Bocas in 2020 included plans for Caribbean writers with new books to participate in UK literary festivals as well as events at the British Library, Oxford University and the University of East Anglia.

=== History ===
The Bocas Lit Fest was held for the first time in 2011 – from Thursday, 28 April to Sunday, 1 May – including readings, panel discussions, workshops, film screenings and art exhibitions. Attracting 3,500 attendances over the four days. the festival reflected its founder's aims "to promote literature and publishing in Trinidad and Tobago and the need for Caribbean writing to be celebrated everywhere".

The scores of writers taking part in the 2012 festival, both locally based and from abroad, included Fred D'Aguiar, Earl Lovelace, Vahni Capildeo, Chika Unigwe, Monique Roffey, Kenneth Ramchand, Mervyn Morris, Achy Obejas, Rabindranath Maharaj, George Lamming, professor of genetics Steve Jones, Merle Hodge, Rahul Bhattacharya, and Michael Anthony. The festival featured readings, discussions, performances, workshops, screenings of films based on Caribbean writing and music.

In 2013, the South+Central NGC Bocas Lit Fest, scheduled to take place annually in November, was inaugurated. In November 2014, NGC Bocas Lit Fest South was hosted by Southern Academy for the Performing Arts (SAPA) in San Fernando, birthplace of the writer Sam Selvon, and the festival commemorated the 20th anniversary of his death.

In 2014, "Festival Radio" was inaugurated, to "bring the festival experience to listeners around the globe", as well as attracting "a lot of attention on social media, spurred on in part by the active new media presence of the festival itself".

As of 2022, Nicholas Laughlin has been the festival and programme director of the Bocas Lit Fest, with Marina Salandy-Brown remaining as the festival's president.

Title sponsor NGC only partially funded the literary festival in 2024, and made no contribution to the 2025 festival.

== Recognition ==
In February 2017, the Bocas Lit Fest was named as one of "the world's very best literary events" in a list of "20 Best Literary Festivals Around the World That You Should Attend" chosen by Penguin Random House - The Writers' Academy, alongside other prestigious festivals including Hay, Edinburgh and Jaipur.

Another accolade, from Jonathan Ford of the Financial Times in May 2017, noted: "In the seven years since Bocas launched, Caribbean writers have been heaped with international accolades — the 2015 Man Booker Prize for Fiction, four Forward Prizes for Poetry between 2014 and 2016, and a slew of National Book Awards. Virtually all the writers honoured — including Marlon James, Kei Miller and Vahni Capildeo — were first recognised at this extraordinary little festival in the tropics, a place that is only far away to those who refuse to read."

The Bocas Lit Fest, together with its founder Marina Salandy-Brown, was honoured by the International Women's Forum (IWF) in the "Ideas Remaking the World" segment of IWF's World Leadership Conference in November 2021, being described as "the embodiment of Caribbean vibrancy, energy and creativity".

== Associated initiatives ==
=== The OCM Bocas Prize for Caribbean Literature ===
The centrepiece of the NGC Bocas Lit Fest festival is the announcement at an award ceremony of the overall winner of the OCM Bocas Prize for Caribbean Literature. Entries for the prize are in the categories of fiction, non-fiction and poetry for a book by a Caribbean writer published in the previous year, with the overall winner being chosen by a panel of judges from the three genre winners. The winners have been: in 2011, Derek Walcott's poetry collection White Egrets, in 2012 Earl Lovelace's novel Is Just a Movie, in 2013 Monique Roffey's novel Archipelago, in 2014 Robert Antoni's novel As Flies to Whatless Boys, in 2015 Vladimir Lucien's Sounding Ground (poetry), in 2016 Olive Senior's The Pain Tree (fiction), in 2017 Kei Miller's Augustown (fiction), in 2018 Jennifer Rahim's Curfew Chronicles (fiction), and in 2019 Kevin Adonis Browne's High Mas (non-fiction).

=== The Emerging Caribbean Writers Prize (formerly the Hollick Arvon Caribbean Writers Prize) ===
The Emerging Caribbean Writers Prize, formerly known as the Hollick Arvon Caribbean Writers Prize, is jointly administered by the Bocas Lit Fest and the creative writing organisation Arvon, and is an award that allows an emerging Caribbean writer living and working in the Caribbean to devote time to developing or finishing a literary work in-progress, with support from an established writer as mentor. Sponsored by the Hollick Family Charitable Trust for a period of three years (2013–15), and announced at the Bocas Lit Fest in 2012 by Sue Woodford-Hollick, the prize was awarded to writers in three literary genres over consecutive years: fiction in 2013; non-fiction in 2014; and poetry in 2015. The first winner in 2013, for fiction, was Barbara Jenkins of Trinidad & Tobago. The winner in 2014, for non-fiction, was Jamaican Diana McCaulay. In 2015, the prize was awarded to poet Danielle Boodoo-Fortuné.

=== The Bocas Henry Swanzy Award ===
The Bocas Henry Swanzy Award for Distinguished Service to Caribbean Letters (named after the influential producer of the BBC radio programme Caribbean Voices that ran from 1943 to 1958) was inaugurated at the 2013 NGC Bocas Lit Fest, as an "annual lifetime achievement award to recognise service to Caribbean literature by editors, publishers, critics, broadcasters, and others".

In 2013, the award was made to John La Rose (posthumously) and Sarah White of New Beacon Books. In 2014, the award was jointly won by Professors Kenneth Ramchand and Gordon Rohlehr. The 2015 recipient was Margaret Busby. The 2016 award went to Jeremy Poynting of Peepal Tree Press. In 2017, the award went to Joan Dayal, the owner of one of Trinidad and Tobago's leading independent bookshops, Paperbased Book Store. The 2018 honour went to Anne Walmsley, previously an editor and publisher for Longman Caribbean and Africa, who produced two key Caribbean literature anthologies: The Sun’s Eye and Facing the Sea. In 2019, the awardee was publisher Ian Randle. The 2021 recipients were Edward Baugh and Mervyn Morris, both professors emeriti of the University of the West Indies. Merle Hodge and Funso Aiyejina won the 2022 award. Trinidad-born scholar Sandra Pouchet Paquet received the award in 2023, and Guyana-born publisher Arif Ali was announced as the 2024 winner. In 2025, the Journal of West Indian Literature was honoured with the award.

=== The Burt Award for Caribbean Literature ===
The Bocas Lit Fest additionally administers the Burt Award sponsored by CODE (Canadian Organization for Development Through Education) for Caribbean authors of literature for young adults, launched in 2013.

The first-place winner in 2014 was A-dZiko Gegele, in second place was Joanne Hillhouse and in third place Colleen Smith-Dennis. In 2015, first prize went to Imam Baksh. In second place was Diana McCaulay and third was Lynn Joseph. The 2016 prize winner was debut novelist Tamika Gibson, with Florenz Webbe Maxwell of Bermuda second, and Danielle Y. C. McClean in third place. The 2017 winner was Viviana Prado-Núñez (Puerto Rico/USA), with Kevin Jared Hosein (Trinidad & Tobago) as runner-up, and Lisa Allen-Agostini (Trinidad & Tobago) in third place.

=== Caribbean Literature Action Group (CALAG) ===
Launched in 2012 was the Caribbean Literature Action Group (CALAG), a new partnership between the NGC Bocas Lit Fest, the British Council, and Commonwealth Writers, aimed at supporting the development of Caribbean writing and publishing. Public initiatives of the project use the "CaribLit" brand.

=== The National Poetry Slam ===
The Bocas Lit Fest produces the National Poetry Slam in Trinidad and Tobago. The event was sponsored by local bank First Citizens, from 2013-2025. The event is regarded as the most prominent spoken-word poetry competition in the region.

== See also ==
- OCM Bocas Prize for Caribbean Literature
