= University of the West Indies at St. Augustine =

Public research university in St. Augustine, Trinidad and Tobago

Coordinates: 10.642°N 61.400°W

- Motto: Oriens Ex Occidente Lux (Latin)
- Motto in English: A Light Rising From The West
- Type: Regional, public, autonomous
- Established: 1960
- Affiliations: Association of Commonwealth Universities (ACU); Caribbean Community; Association of Atlantic Universities
- Location: St. Augustine, Trinidad and Tobago
Colors
- Website: sta.uwi.edu

The University of the West Indies at St. Augustine is a public research university in St. Augustine, Trinidad and Tobago. It is the most developed of the 5 general campuses in the University of the West Indies system, which are ranked 1st in the Caribbean. It is ranked 1st in Trinidad and Tobago and 28th best in Latin America.

Although St. Augustine is the main campus in Trinidad and Tobago, there are also a satellite campuses of UWI St. Augustine in nearby Mount Hope (within the Eric Williams Medical Sciences Complex) that houses the Faculty of Medical Sciences of the University as well as the new South campus in Debe. UWI St. Augustine, which began in 1960, was borne out of the Imperial College of Tropical Agriculture. It is the only member university of the system that boasts a Faculty of Food and Agriculture, an area of expertise that has long been interwoven into the history of the Caribbean islands.

The University confers degrees from bachelor to doctoral levels.

== Notable alumni ==
- Funso Aiyejina, Winner of the Commonwealth Writers' Prize
- Kevin Jared Hosein, Winner of the Commonwealth Short Story Prize
- Faris Al-Rawi
- Keith Rowley
- Shakuntala Haraksingh Thilsted
- Roshan Parasram
- Patricia Bishop
- Jehue Gordon
- Jack Warner (football executive)
- Gordon Shirley, Jamaican diplomat
- Edwin Carrington
- Khalid Hassanali, Former President of Petrotrin
- Vahni Capildeo, Winner of the Windham–Campbell Literature Prizes
- Kiran Maharaj, Freelance Correspondent for CNN World Report
- Davan Maharaj, Honorary Graduate, Former Editor of the Los Angeles Times
- Jennifer Rahim, Winner of the Casa de las Américas Prize
- Barbara Jenkins, Winner of the Commonwealth Short Story Prize
- Vladimir Lucien, Winner of the OCM Bocas Prize for Caribbean Literature
- Michael Anthony (author), Honorary Graduate
- Lisa Morris-Julian
- Marina Salandy-Brown, Honorary Graduate
- Nicholas Laughlin, Editor of the Caribbean Review of Books and Caribbean Beat
- Giselle Laronde, Miss World 1986
- Kenisha Thom
- Sam Selvon, Honorary Graduate
- Mighty Shadow, Honorary Graduate
- David Rudder, Honorary Graduate
- Brother Resistance
- Heather Headley, Honorary Graduate
- Gérard Besson, Honorary Graduate
- Professor Niranjan Kissoon, Honorary Graduate
- Rhonda McEwen
- Baroness Floella Benjamin, Honorary Graduate

== Notable faculty ==
- Courtenay Bartholomew
- Rose-Marie Belle Antoine
- Grace Jackson
- Joan Latchman
- Earl Lovelace
- George Maxwell Richards
- David Nicholls (theologian)
- Angelique Nixon
- Kenneth Ramchand
- Richard Robertson
- Gordon Rohlehr
- Hazel Simmons-McDonald
- John Spence (scientist)
- Marjorie Thorpe
- Elizabeth Walcott-Hackshaw
- Che Lovelace
