= Discover Trinidad and Tobago =

Travel/visitor guide to Trinidad and Tobago

Discover Trinidad and Tobago is an annual, free (advertising-supported) travel/visitor guide to Trinidad and Tobago. It has been published by Media and Editorial Projects Limited since 1991.

Discover Trinidad and Tobago was initially published twice per year, but switched to annual publication in the mid-1990s. Its 2009 edition was its 20th. Each edition begins distribution at the World Travel Market in London. The magazine began at 5"x7", and re-sized to an A5 format with the 2007 edition. It ventured into web-offset printing with the 2009 edition, claiming to have decreased its paper usage by 1.1 million pages. The magazine usually publishes a Trinidad & Tobago guide as well as a separate Discover Tobago booklet (consisting of information reproduced from the Tobago section of the complete book). In 2010, only a twin-island edition was published. Its website was also re-launched in 2009, including articles from previous issues in addition to the current edition.

The magazine's founding editor was Jeremy Taylor, and it since has been edited by Georgia Popplewell, Skye Hernandez, Nicholas Laughlin, Caroline Taylor, Anu Lakhan and Nazma Muller. Contributors have included local and foreign Trinidad and Tobago writers, journalists and photographers. Its coverage typically includes short overviews of the islands' accommodation; business; arts and entertainment; food, dining and restaurants; natural history; touring and sightseeing; sports; shopping; history; vacation/holiday planning; and local transportation. Corresponding current events are posted on its blog.
