= List of newspapers in Trinidad and Tobago =

This list of newspapers in Trinidad and Tobago is a list of newspapers printed and distributed in the Trinidad and Tobago. It includes a list of daily newspapers, weekly and specialty newspapers, community newspapers and magazines published in Trinidad and Tobago.

Trinidad and Tobago has three national newspapers.

== Trinidad and Tobago newspapers ==
=== National daily newspapers ===
- Trinidad and Tobago's Newsday, national, 19-21 Chacon Street, Port of Spain (North Office)
- Trinidad Express Newspapers, national, 35-37 Independence Square, Port of Spain (North Office, Production House)
- Trinidad and Tobago Guardian, national, 22-24 St. Vincent Street, Port of Spain (North Office) 4-10 Rodney Road, Chaguanas (Central Office)

=== Weekly and specialty newspapers ===
- The Anglican Outlook, 2 Hayes Street, St. Clair, Port of Spain
- Blast Newspaper, 5-6 Hingoo Lands, San Juan
- Bomb Newspaper, Southern Main Road & Clifford St. Curepe
- The Catholic News
- The Eastern Times, Sunset Drive, Arouca
- Hello Small Business & Tradesman News
- The Independent, 20 Abercromby Street, Port of Spain
- The Moruga Chronicle, Moruga Road, Basse Terre, Moruga
- The Probe
- The Village Newspaper, Hosein Drive, Tacarigua; Newspapers in Trinidad & Tobago
- Jobhuntt Classified Limited, Golden Doors Plaza, Port Of Spain in Trinidad & Tobago
- Kid Life Newspaper, Hosein Drive, Tacarigua; Newspapers for children in Trinidad & Tobago
- Showtime Newspaper, Ninth Street & Ninth Avenue, Barataria (North Office)
- Sunday Punch Newspaper, Ninth Street & Ninth Avenue, Barataria (North Office)
- TnT Mirror, Ninth Street & Ninth Avenue, Barataria,
- The Trinidad and Tobago Sunshine Newspaper, Kantac Plaza, Arouca
- The Weekend Heat, Southern Main Road, Curepe

=== Tobago newspapers ===
- Tobago News, TIDCO Mall, Scarborough
- Tobago Pillar, U Turn Mall, Wilson Road, Scarborough, Tobago

=== Monthly journals ===
- Trinidad and Tobago Review, Trinidad & Tobago Institute of the West Indies at Tapia House, 82–84 St. Vincent Street, Tunapuna

=== Magazines ===
- Abstract Magazine
- Boca - marine and yachting magazine
- Bushlife Magazine - We carry the role of promoting herbs and tea consumption to Trinidad and Tobago and the wider Caribbean. Published by the TEA & HERBAL MEDICINE ASSOCIATION @HarbariumTT on Facebook.
- Business Trinidad and Tobago
- Caribbean Beat - Caribbean Airlines inflight magazine
- Caribbean E-Business Magazine
- Coco Belle Magazine - beauty and lifestyle Caribbean magazine
- Comic Publisher
- Contact Magazine
- Critical Analysis
- Discover Trinidad and Tobago
- The Draft
- Executive Time
- Exporter
- Ins and Outs of Trinidad and Tobago
- Island Sports and Fitness
- Just Comics and More
- Living World Journal
- MACO magazines - MACO Caribbean Living, MACO People Trinidad, and MACO People Barbados
- Paradise Pulse - online lifestyle magazine
- Ranting Trini
- St Augustine News - UWI
- Scorch
- SixthSpeed Tuner Magazine
- Sweet TnT Magazine
- Tobago Today
- Topsoil Magazine
- TT NRG - local publication on oil and gas
- Trin Mag
- Trinidad-Tobago Net
- The Westerly
- UWI Today
- Vox
- Who's Who in Trinidad and Tobago Business
- Zorce Racing Magazine

=== News websites ===
- www.trinidadexpress.com - Trinidad Express
- www.tv6tnt.com - CCN TV6
- www.cnc3.co.tt - CNC 3 TV
- www.guardian.co.tt - Guardian
- www.wired868.com - Wired 868
- sweettntmagazine.com - Sweet TnT Magazine
