= Rabindranath Maharaj =

Trinidadian-Canadian writer and editor

- Born: Rabindranath Maharaj; 1955 (age 70–71); Trinidad and Tobago
- Occupation: Novelist
- Writing career
- Language: English
- Genre: Fiction
- Notable works: The Amazing Absorbing Boy, A Perfect Pledge, Homer in Flight
- Notable awards: Toronto Book Award, Trillium Book Award
- Website: rabindranathmaharaj.com

Rabindranath Maharaj (born 1955) is a Trinidadian-Canadian novelist, short story writer, and a founding editor of the Canadian literary journal Lichen. His novel The Amazing Absorbing Boy won the 2010 Trillium Book Award and the 2011 Toronto Book Award, and several of his books have been shortlisted for the Rogers Writers' Trust Fiction Prize, the Commonwealth Writers' Prize (Canada and Caribbean Region), and the Chapters/Books in Canada First Novel Award.

He was raised in George Village, Tableland in South Trinidad and Tobago. After receiving a B.A. in English, an M.A. in English and History, and Diploma of Education from the University of the West Indies at Saint Augustine, he worked as a teacher and, briefly, as a columnist for the Trinidad Guardian.

In the early 1990s, Maharaj immigrated to Canada, and in 1993, he completed a second M.A. (this one in Creative Writing) at the University of New Brunswick. In 1994 he moved to the town of Ajax, Ontario, where he taught high school for a number of years. In 1998, Maharaj, along with three other Durham Region writers – Ruth E. Walker, Gwynn Scheltema, and Lucy Brennan – founded and co-edited Lichen Literary Journal, which was launched in May 1999. He remained on the editorial board for another three years.

Since then he has, among other posts, been a writer in residence at the Toronto Reference Library, the University of the West Indies, the University of New Brunswick, a mentor for young writers with Diaspora Dialogues, a faculty member at the Banff Writing Studio, and an instructor with the Humber College School for Writers, and the University of Toronto School of Continuing Studies. Apart from his novels and collections of short stories, he has published work in various literary journals and anthologies; written book reviews and articles for The Washington Post, The Globe and Mail, the Toronto Star, and others; written a play for CBC Radio; and written two screenplays.

His novel Adjacentland was shortlisted for the 2019 ReLit Award for fiction and the novel, Fatboy Fall Down won the 2019 Foreword Indies Silver Medal for Literary Fiction.

Maharaj continues to reside in Ajax, Ontario.

== Bibliography ==
=== Novels ===
Rabindranath Maharaj talks about The Amazing Absorbing Boy on Bookbits radio.

- Homer in Flight (1997), Goose Lane Editions (also available as an audiobook)
- The Lagahoo's Apprentice (2000), Knopf Canada; and Turkey İşbank Culture Publications
- A Perfect Pledge (2005), Knopf Canada; Farrar, Straus and Giroux in the US; and Mouria Press, Netherlands
- The Picture of Nobody (2010), Good Reads/HarperCollins Canada
- The Amazing Absorbing Boy (2010), Knopf Canada
- Adjacentland (2018), Buckrider Books/Wolsak and Wynn Publishers Ltd.
- Fatboy Fall Down (2019), ECW Press

=== Short story collections ===
- The Interloper (1995), Goose Lane Editions
- The Writer and His Wife (1996), Peepal Tree Press, UK
- The Book of Ifs and Buts (2002), Vintage Canada
- A Quiet Disappearance (2025), Mawenzi House

=== Anthologies ===
- New Writing from the Caribbean : Selections from the Caribbean writer (1994), The Macmillan Press Ltd
- AWOL : Tales for Travel-Inspired Minds (2003), Vintage Canada
- Victory Meat - New Fiction in Atlantic Canada (2003), Anchor Canada
- Reading Writers Reading - Canadian Authors' Reflections (2006), University of Alberta Press
- TOK: Writing the New Toronto, book 2 (2007), Zephyr Press
- City of Words (2009), Cormorant Books
- Northwords (2012), House of Anansi Press
- Luminous Ink: Writers on Writing in Canada (as editor, with Tessa McWatt and Dionne Brand) (2018), Cormorant Books

=== Radio plays ===
- Malcolm and Alvin (for CBC Radio)

=== Screenplays ===
- Malini (co-writer)
- Crabman and Sandbird (writer)

== Awards, prizes and nominations ==
- 1996 Finalist, Commonwealth Writers' Prize, for best first book (for The Interloper)
- 1998 Finalist, Chapters/Books in Canada First Novel Award (for Homer in Flight)
- 2005 Finalist, Commonwealth Writer's Prize (for A Perfect Pledge)
- 2005 Finalist, Rogers Writers' Trust Fiction Prize, for best novel (for A Perfect Pledge)
- 2010 Trillium Book Award, for best book (for The Amazing Absorbing Boy)
- 2011 Longlist, OCM Bocas Prize for Caribbean Literature (for The Amazing Absorbing Boy)
- 2011 Toronto Book Award (for The Amazing Absorbing Boy)
- 2012 Lifetime Literary Award, from NALIS – Trinidad & Tobago's National Library and Information Systems Authority
- 2013 Queen Elizabeth II Diamond Jubilee Medal, which honours significant contributions & achievements by Canadians
- 2018 Finalist, Foreword Indies Award for Literary Fiction (for Adjacentland)
- 2019 Long shortlist, ReLit Awards, for novel (for Adjacentland)
- 2019 Silver Medal, Foreword Indies Award for Literary Fiction (for Fat Boy Fall Down)
