= Barbara Jenkins =

Trinidadian writer

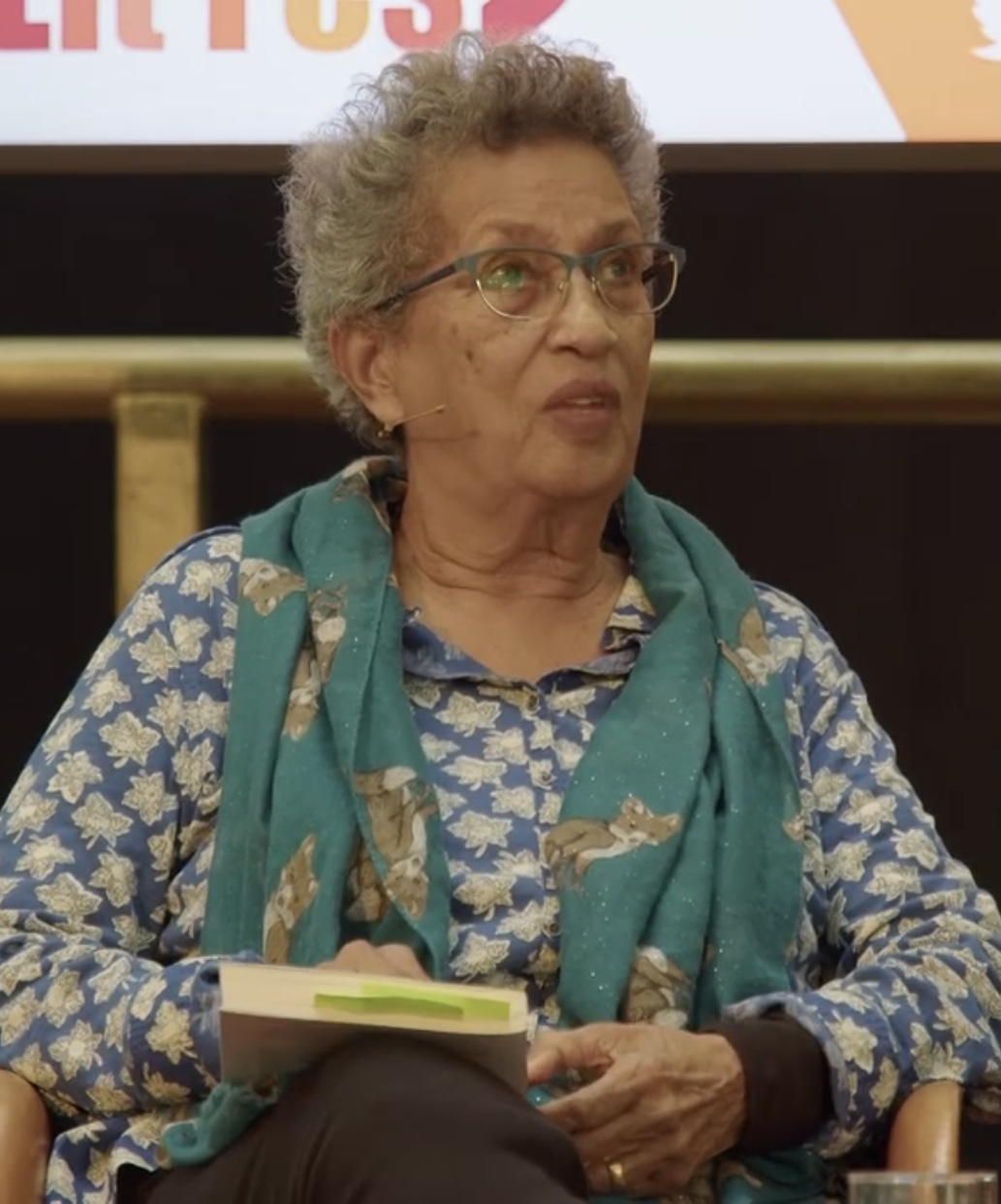
- Jenkins at the British Library in 2022
- Born: San Fernando, Trinidad
- Education: Aberystwyth University; Cardiff University; University of the West Indies
- Children: 3
- Awards: Commonwealth Short Story Prize; Guyana Prize for Caribbean Literature

Barbara Jenkins is a Trinidadian writer, whose work since 2010 has won several international prizes, including the Commonwealth Short Story Prize and the Wasafiri New Writing Prize.

== Biography ==
Barbara Jenkins was born in San Fernando, Trinidad. She studied at the University College of Wales, Aberystwyth, and at University College, Cardiff. She married a fellow student, and during the 1960s lived in Wales, returning to Trinidad in the early 1970s. She has described her successful writing career as "accidental": after she retired as a secondary school geography teacher, she joined a writers group in 2007 at the urging of a friend, and subsequently was accepted on the workshop for regional writers hosted by the Cropper Foundation. Jenkins went on to take the Master's of Fine Arts (MFA) creative writing programme at the University of the West Indies at St Augustine, graduating in 2012 with high commendation. Her MFA thesis formed the basis for her debut book, Sic Transit Wagon.

Her short stories have been published in journals including Wasafiri, The Caribbean Writer and Small Axe, as well as in the collections Moving Right Along: Caribbean Stories in Honour of John Cropper, eds Funso Aiyejina and Judy Stone (Caroni, Trinidad: Lexicon, 2010), Pepperpot: Best New Stories from the Caribbean (New York and Leeds: Peekash Press, 2014), Trinidad Noir: The Classics, ed. Robert Antoni (Akashic Books, 2017), and New Daughters of Africa, ed. Margaret Busby (London: Myriad Editions, 2019).

Her work won several international prizes: the Commonwealth Short Story Prize (Caribbean Region) in 2010 (for "Something from Nothing") and 2011 (for "Head Not Made for Hat Alone"), the Wasafiri New Writing Prize; the Canute Brodhurst Prize for short fiction from The Caribbean Writer; the Small Axe short story competition in 2011; the Romance Category, My African Diaspora Short Story Contest; and the inaugural Caribbean Communications Network (CCN) Prize for a film review of the Trinidad and Tobago Film Festival, 2012.

In 2013 she won the inaugural Bocas Lit Fest's Hollick Arvon Caribbean Writers Prize (now known as the Emerging Caribbean Writers Prize, jointly administered with the Arvon Foundation), an award given to allow a Caribbean writer living and working in the Caribbean to devote time to developing or finishing a literary work, with support from an established writer as mentor. Award-winning British writer Bernardine Evaristo subsequently mentored Jenkins.

Her debut collection of short stories, Sic Transit Wagon and Other Stories, was published in 2013 by Peepal Tree Press, and in 2015 was awarded the 2014 Guyana Prize for Caribbean Literature for the best book of fiction. She won the Bloody Scotland-Bocas Lit Fest Crime Writing Prize in 2014.

Jenkins was in 2015 the inaugural British Council International Writer in Residence at the Small Wonder Short Story Festival at Charleston in East Sussex.

An excerpt from her then novel-in-progress, De Rightest Place, appeared in The Caribbean Review of Books in October 2015. Published in 2018 by Peepal Tree Press, De Rightest Place – likened in setting to a Trinidadian Cheers – has been described as "a novel with a great deal of heart. It's a funny, moving and ultimately uplifting story". In 2019, Jenkins was shortlisted for the inaugural RSL Christopher Bland Prize, set up by the Royal Society of Literature to encourage and celebrate older writers first published at the age of 50 or over.

== Selected bibliography ==
- Sic Transit Wagon and other stories, Leeds: Peepal Tree Press, 2013. ISBN 978-1845232146
- De Rightest Place (novel), Leeds: Peepal Tree Press, 2018. ISBN 978-1845234225
- The Stranger Who Was Myself (memoir), Leeds: Peepal Tree Press, 2022. ISBN 9781845235345

== Awards ==
- 2010 Commonwealth Short Story Prize, for "Something from Nothing"
- 2011 Commonwealth Short Story Prize, for "Head Not Made for Hat Alone"
- 2013 Hollick Arvon Caribbean Writers Prize
- 2014 Guyana Prize for Caribbean Literature, for Sic Transit Wagon and Other Stories
- 2014 Bloody Scotland-Bocas Lit Fest Crime Writing Prize
- Canute Brodhurst Prize for short fiction
- Small Axe short story competition
- Romance Category, My African Diaspora Short Story Contest
