= National Poetry Slam: Trinidad and Tobago =

Poetry Competition in Trinidad

The National Poetry Slam: Trinidad and Tobago is an annual showcase for Trinbagonian spoken word artists The showcase was sponsored by First Citizens for thirteen years, as culture and youth development were critical pillars of the organisation's corporate social responsibility mandate. It is one of the primary spoken word poetry showcases in the Caribbean region.

== History ==
The first iteration of the National Poetry Slam: Trinidad and Tobago occurred in November 2012 at the University of the Southern Caribbean. The event, called VERSES at the time, was organised by an arts-based NGO, The 2 Cents Movement, to create a competitive space for practising poets who produced exceptional craft. At that point, the organisation offered the winner a TTD $1000 cash prize, which was collected from ticket sales at the door.

The following year, The Bocas Lit Fest approached local poet Muhammad Muwakil for ideas to increase youth inclusion at their annual literary festival. Muwakil then collaborated with the founder of The 2 Cents Movement, Jean Claude Cournand, to include VERSES in the Bocas Lit Fest 2013. First Citizens, who collaborated with the Bocas Lit Fest to increase youth visibility in the literary arts, sponsored the event that year and increased the cash prize to TTD 3000 for the winner. The 2013 edition took place at the Nalis Public Library in Port-of-Spain.

For the next few years, the competition was a collaboration between The Bocas Lit Fest and The 2 Cents Movement, with the former hosting the event and the latter producing the logistics. First Citizens remained the sponsor for the event. By 2014, the event had moved to the Central Bank Auditorium due to the significant increase in interested patrons. First Citizens upped the cash prize to TTD 10,000. In 2015 and 2016, the prize increased to TTD 20,000 with another venue change. Globe Theatre in Port-of-Spain was used in 2015 and 2016.

The next significant change took place in 2017. The event was renamed the First Citizens National Poetry Slam. It had drawn significant regional interest and was held at the National Academy for Performing Arts (NAPA). Furthermore, First Citizens increased the prize to TTD 50,000, which at the time was one of the world's highest prizes for spoken word. The event remained in NAPA from 2017 to 2019.

The COVID-19 pandemic significantly impacted the live event. The 2 Cents Movement could no longer manage the event due to complications in the organisation. The pandemic forced the competition to shift from being the closing event of the Bocas Lit Fest (usually at the end of April) to a stand-alone event. Bocas partnered with local television station TV6 to televise the event. The final was filmed at Queen's Hall. In 2021, the final was also televised by local TV station TTT. In 2022, the final was once again produced for a live audience at Naparima Bowl in San Fernando, marking the first time since its induction that the slam moved outside of the capital. In 2023, the competition returned to the Central Bank Auditorium. It was once again the closing event of the Bocas Lit Fest, as the effects of the pandemic were behind the organisation. In 2024, the final took place in Queen's Hall, Port-of-Spain.

=== Historical Summary of the Competition ===
Year	Event Name	Venue	Title Sponsor	Manager	Producer	1st Prize	2nd Prize	3rd Prize	Other
2012	Verses	USC NB Auditorium, Maracas	The 2 Cents Movement	The 2 Cents Movement	The 2 Cents Movement	$1000	N/A	N/A	N/A
2013	Verses Bocas Poetry Slam	Nalis OLD Fire Station POS	First Citizens	Bocas Lit Fest	The 2 Cents Movement	$3000	$1000	$500	N/A
2014	Verses Bocas Poetry Slam	Central Bank Auditorium POS	First Citizens	Bocas Lit Fest	The 2 Cents Movement	$10,000	$5,000	$3,000	N/A
2015	Verses Bocas Poetry Slam	Globe POS	First Citizens	Bocas Lit Fest	The 2 Cents Movement	$20,000	$5,000	$3,000	$800
2016	Verses Bocas Poetry Slam	Globe POS	First Citizens	Bocas Lit Fest	The 2 Cents Movement	$20,000	$10,000	$5,000	$1000
2017	First Citizens National Poetry Slam	Lord Kitchener Auditorium NAPA POS	First Citizens	Bocas Lit Fest	The 2 Cents Movement	$50,000	$20,000	$10,000	$800
2018	First Citizens National Poetry Slam	Lord Kitchener Auditorium NAPA POS	First Citizens	Bocas Lit Fest	The 2 Cents Movement	$50,000	$20,000	$10,000	$800
2019	First Citizens National Poetry Slam	Lord Kitchener Auditorium NAPA POS	First Citizens	Bocas Lit Fest	The 2 Cents Movement	$50,000	$20,000	$10,000	$800
2020*	First Citizens National Poetry Slam	Queen's Hall POS	First Citizens	Bocas Lit Fest	TV6/Bocas Lit Fest	$50,000	$20,000	$10,000	$800
2021*	First Citizens National Poetry Slam	TTT Studios	First Citizens	Bocas Lit Fest	TTT/Bocas Lit Fest	$50,000	$20,000	$10,000	$800
2022	First Citizens National Poetry Slam	Naparima Bowl, San Fernando	First Citizens	Bocas Lit Fest	TTT/Bocas Lit Fest	$50,000	$20,000	$10,000	$500
2023	First Citizens National Poetry Slam	Central Bank POS	First Citizens	Bocas Lit Fest	TTT/Bocas Lit Fest	$50,000	$20,000	$10,000	$500
2024	First Citizens National Poetry Slam	Queen's Hall	First Citizens	Bocas Lit Fest	TTT/Bocas Lit Fest	$50,000	$20,000	$10,000	$500
2025	First Citizens National Poetry Slam	Lord Kitchener Auditorium NAPA POS	First Citizens	Bocas Lit Fest	TTT/Bocas Lit Fest	$50,000	$20,000	$10,000	$1000
2026	National Poetry Slam	Lord Kitchener Auditorium NAPA POS	Bocas Lit Fest	Bocas Lit Fest	Bocas Lit Fest	$25,000	$15,000	$8,000	$1500

- Televised only

All $ is Trinidad and Tobago currency.

== Format ==
Since 2014, the competition has had three major stages: Auditions, Semi-Finals, and Finals. For most years, almost 100 poets sign up for auditions. The number of participants who move on from auditions to semi-finals and from the semi-finals to finals is not fixed. Still, it has traditionally ranged between 30 and 40 for semi-finals and between 10 and 15 for finals. Poets usually have a maximum of four minutes to perform their poems.

== Winners ==
Alexandra Stewart has won the competition thrice (2019, 2020 and 2022). No other poet has won more than once. Here is a list of the winners over the years.

Year	Winner	2nd Place	3rd Place
2012	Angelo Hart	Charnell Lucien	Chinyere Herbert
2013	Crystal Skeete	Akile Wallace	Kito Fortune
2014	Idrees Saleem	Brendon O'Brien	Akile Wallace
2015	Akile Wallace	Derron Sandy	Kleon McPherson
2016	Seth Sylvester	Kyle Hernandez	Idrees Saleem
2017	Camryn Bruno	Alexandra Stewart	Idrees Saleem
2018	Deneka Thomas	Kyle Hernandez	Idrees Saleem
2019	Alexandra Stewart	Shineque Saunders	Deneka Thomas
2020	Alexandra Stewart	Kevin Soyer	Ahmad Muhammad
2021	Derron Sandy	Alexandra Stewart	Michael Logie
2022	Alexandra Stewart	Kevin Soyer	Derron Sandy
2023	Kyle Hernandez	Derron Sandy	Alexandra Stewart
2024	Shakira Burton	Alexandra Stewart	Seth Sylvester
2025	Shaquille Warren	Derron Sandy	Alicia Psyche Haynes
2026	Johchele Johnson	Derron Sandy	Seth Sylvester

=== Finalists By Year ===
Listed by top-3 and then alphabetical order except where placements were publicly released for all competitors. The number in brackets is the total number of finalists in that year.

2012 (9) - Angelo Hart, Charnell Lucien, Chinyere Herbert, Kito Fortunę (4th), Hadiya Phillips (5th), Afiya Lynch, Genevieve Valentine, Jabari Lynch and Warren De Mills

2013 (6) - Crystal Skeete, Akile Wallace, Kito Fortunę, Hadiya Phillips (4th), Idrees Saleem (5th) and Warren De Mills

2014 (12) - Idrees Saleem, Brendon O'Brien, Akile Wallace, Chike Pilgrim, Crystal Skeete, Cynzia Wallace, Derron Sandy, Ivory Hayes, Kito Fortune, Kleon McPherson, Kwame Weekes and Latisha Herbert.

2015 (12) - Akile Wallace, Derron Sandy, Kleon McPherson, Ariana Herbert, Brandon O'Brien, Chike Pilgirm Deneka Thomas, Idrees Saleem, Jabari Lynch, Kito Fortune, Leandra Williamson and Verne Tittle

2016 (14) - Seth Sylvester, Kyle Hernandez, Idrees Saleem, Akile Wallace, ALexandra Stewart, Brandon O'Brien, Darrion Narine, Deneka Thomas, Derron Sandy, Kirby Moses, Marcus Millette, Michael Logie, Safiya St. Clair and Verne Titte.

2017 (13) - Camryn Bruno, Alexandra Stewart, Idrees Saleem, Brendon O'Brien, Deja Lewis, Derron Sandy, D'Israel Billy, Emmanuel Villafana, Kyle Hernandez, Marcus Millette, Michael Logie, Seth Sylvester and Shineque Saunders

2018 (15) - Deneka Thomas, Kyle Hernandez, Idrees Saleem, Ahmad Muhammad, Akile Wallace, Alexandra Stewart, Brendon O'Brien, Camryn Bruno, Carlon George, Davon Musgrave, Dellon Mathison, Deja Lewis Jillian Smith Marcus Abraham, Marcus Millette and Shineque Saunders

2019 (16) - Alexandra Stewart, Shineque Saunders, Deneka Thomas, Abdul Majeed Abdal Karim, Brendon O'Brien, Crystal St. Hillaire (Formerly Crystal Skeete), Idrees Saleem, Isaiah John, Javaughn Forde, Kyle Hernandez, Marcus Millette, Michael Logie, Muhammad Muwakil, Ronaldo "Red" Frederick, Seth Sylvester and Shimiah Lewis.

2020 (13) - Alexandra Stewart, Kevin Soyer, Ahmad Muhammad, Gary Acosta, Nia Thompson, Ronald Forde, Ronaldo "Red" Frederick, Seth Sylvester, Shimiah Lewis, Shineque Saunders, Sophia Cooper, Tineka Francois and Zakiya Gill.

2021 (11) - Derron Sandy, Alexandra Stewart, Michael Logie, Abdul Majeed Abdal Karim (4th), Ronaldo Mohammed (5th), Zakiya Gill (6th), Terriq Betaudier (7th), Terryl Betaudier (8th), Shivana Sharma (9th), Renaldo Briggs (10th) and Seth Sylvester (11th).

2022 (11) - Alexandra Stewart, Kevin Soyer, Derron Sandy, Abdul Majeed Abdal Karim, Askala George, Javaughn Forde, Joel Phillip, Michael Logie, Ronaldo Mohammed, Shimiah Lewisand Zakiya Gill

2023 (15) - Kyle Hernandez, Derron Sandy, Alexandra Stewart, Abdul Majeed Abdal Karim, Akile Walllace, Deneka Thomas, Dominique Friday, Javaughn Forde, Michael Logie, Mishael Henry, Renaldo Briggs, Ronaldo Mohammed, Seth Sylvester, Shakir Gray and Soleil La Barrie.

2024 (16) - Shakira Burton, Alexandra Stewart, Seth Sylvester, Abdul Majeed Abdal Karim, Alicia Psyche Haynes, Daniel Baptiste, Darion Cuningham, Derron Sandy, Dershawn Hernandez, Gabrielle Murray, Kedisha Thomas, Keeron Issac, Kyle Hernandez, Renaldo Briggs, Ronaldo Mohammed and Michael Logie.

2025 (14) - Shaquille Warren, Derron Sandy, Alicia Psyche Haynes, Alexandra Stewart, Camryn Bruno, Deneka Thomas, Javaughn Forde, Keeron Issac, Kevin Soyer, Michael Logie, Renaldo Briggs, Rochelle Rawlins, Seth Sylvester and Shakir Gray.

2026 (10) - Johchele Johnson, Derron Sandy, Seth Sylvester, Alexandra Stewart, Alicia Psyche Haynes, Colleen Cleghorn, , Renaldo Briggs, Rickibah Issac, Shaquille Warren and Shimiah Lewis.

== Records ==
=== Most final appearances ===
Alexandra Stewart	11	2016, 2017, 2018, 2019, 2020, 2021, 2022, 2023, 2024, 2025, 2026
Derron Sandy	10	2014, 2015, 2016, 2017,202, 2022, 2023, 2024,2025,2026
Seth Sylvester	9	2016, 2017, 2019, 2020, 2021, 2023, 2024, 2025, 2026
Michael Logie	8	2016, 2017, 2019, 2021, 2022, 2023, 2024,2025
Idrees Saleem	7	2013, 2014, 2015, 2016, 2017, 2018, 2019
Deneka Thomas	6	2015, 2016, 2018, 2019, 2023, 2025
Kyle Hernandez	6	2016,2017,2018,2019, 2023, 2024
Akile Wallace	6	2013,2014,2015,2016,2018, 2023
Abdul Majeed Abdal Karim	5	2019, 2021, 2022, 2023, 2024
Brendon O' Brien	5	2014,2015,2017,2018,2019
Renaldo Briggs	5	2021, 2023, 2024, 2025, 2026
Shimiah Lewis	4	2019, 2020, 2022, 2026
Javaughn Forde	4	2019, 2022, 2023, 2025
Ronaldo Mohammed	4	2021, 2022, 2023, 2024
Kito Fortune	4	2012,2013,2014,2015
Marcus Millette	4	2016,2017,2018,2019
Shineque Saunders	4	2017,2018,2019,2020
Kevin Soyer	3	2020, 2022, 2025
Zakiya Gill	3	2020,2021,2022
Crystal St. Hillaire (formerly Crystal Skeete)	3	2013,2014,2019
Alicia Hayes	3	2024, 2025, 2026
Shaquille Warren	2	2025,2026
Shakira Burton	2	2024, 2025
Keeron Issac	2	2024, 2025
Hadiya Phillips	2	2012,2013
Warren De Mills	2	2012,2013
Kleon McPherson	2	2014,2015
Chike Pilgrim	2	2014,2015
Verne Titte	2	2015,2016
Ahmad Muhammad	2	2018,2020
Renaldo "Red" Frederick	2	2019,2020

=== Most top-3 finishes ===
Name	Number	1st	2nd	3rd
Alexandra Stewart	7	2019, 2020, 2022	2017, 2021, 2024	2023
Derron Sandy	6	2021	2015, 2023, 2025, 2026	2022
Idrees Saleem	4	2014		2016,2017,2018
Kyle Hernandez	3	2023	2016,2018	
Seth Sylvester	3	2016		2024, 2026
Akile Wallace	2	2015	2013	
Deneka Thomas	2	2018		2019
Kevin Soyer	2		2020, 2022	
Angelo Hart	1	2012		
Charnell Lucien	1		2012	
Chinyere Herbert	1			2012
Crystal Skeete	1	2013		
Kito Fortune	1			2013
Brendon O'Brien	1		2014	
Kleon Mc Pherson	1			2015
Shakira Burton	1	2024		
Camryn Bruno	1	2017		
Shineque Saunders	1		2019	
Ahmad Muhammad	1			2020
Michael Logie	1			2021

=== Other Records ===
Most Consecutive Final Appearances - Alexandra Stewart (11)

Most Consecutive Placements - Alexandra Stewart (6)

Most Final Appearances Without a Win - Michael Logie (7)

Most Final Appearances Without a Top-3 Finish - Majeed Karim (5), Renaldo Briggs (5)

Top-3 Finish in their First Finals Appearance -

2012 - Angelo Hart (1st), Charnell Lucien (2nd), Chinyere Herbert (3rd)

2013 - Crystal Skeete (1st), Akile Wallace (2nd)

2016 - Seth Sylvester (1st), Kyle Hernandez (2nd)

2017 - Camryn Bruno (1st)

2020 - Kevin Soyer (2nd)

2024 - Shakira Burton (1st)

2025 - Shaquille Warrren (1st)

2026 - Jochele Johnson (1st)

Youngest Winner

18 years old - Camryn Bruno (2017)

Oldest Winner

34 years old - Derron Sandy (2021)

== Slam Points ==
Slam points is a system developed by local poet Derron Sandy to assess competitors' overall performance in the slam over the years. Every time a poet wins the National Slam they are given 4 points. Second place is given 3 points, third place 2 points, and making the finals gives 1 point. Alexandra Stewart has the most slam points of all time, with a historical tally of 34.

Rank	Name	1st	2nd	3rd	Finalist	Total
1	Alexandra Stewart	12	9	2	11	34
2	Derron Sandy	4	12	2	10	28
3	Idrees Saleem	4	-	6	7	17
3	Seth Sylvester	4	-	4	9	17
5	Kyle Hernandez	4	6	-	6	16
6	Akile Wallace	4	3	-	6	13
7	Deneka Thomas	4	-	2	6	12
8	Michael Logie	-	-	2	8	10
9	Kevin Soyer	-	6	-	3	9
10	Brendon O’Brien	-	3	-	5	8
