= Vahni Capildeo =

Trinidad and Tobago writer (born 1973)

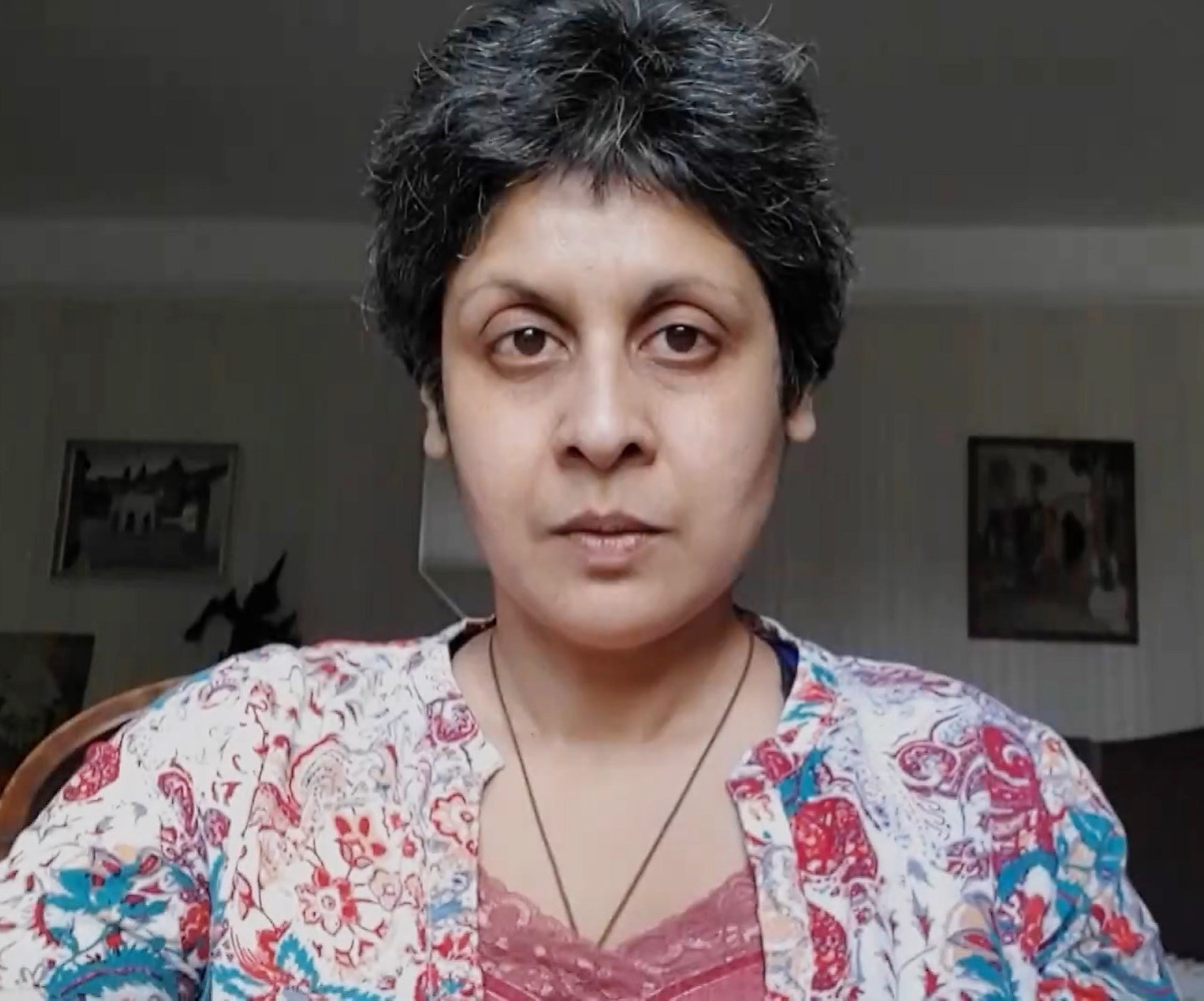
- Capildeo reads for the Jhalak Prize Award 2022
- Born: Surya Vahni Priya Capildeo; 1973 (age 52–53); Port of Spain, Trinidad and Tobago
- Other name: Vahni (Anthony Ezekiel) Capildeo
- Occupation: Writer
- Notable work: Measures of Expatriation (2016 Forward Prize for Poetry)

Vahni Anthony Ezekiel Capildeo (born Surya Vahni Priya Capildeo, 1973) is a Trinidad and Tobago-born British writer, and a member of the extended Capildeo family that has produced notable Trinidadian politicians and writers (including V. S. Naipaul, a cousin of Capildeo's, and Neil Bissoondath).

== Biography ==
Born in 1973 in Port of Spain, Trinidad, Capildeo has lived in Scotland since 2017, and the United Kingdom since 1991. Capildeo is non-binary and uses they/them pronouns.

They read English at Christ Church, Oxford, and were subsequently awarded a Rhodes Scholarship to pursue graduate work in Old Norse and translation theory towards their DPhil, Reading Egils saga Skallagrímssonar: saga, paratext, translations (2001).

They intermitted from a Research Fellowship at Girton College, Cambridge, in 2000–04 to spend time in Trinidad and Jamaica. This produced No Traveller Returns (Salt, 2003), a book-length poem sequence, and One Scattered Skeleton, a non-fiction book on the palimpsestic nature of place, memory, and language. One Scattered Skeleton takes its title from a poem by the Guyanese poet Martin Carter and moves between the UK, the Caribbean, and Iceland. Extracts from the book have appeared in London: City of Disappearances (ed. Iain Sinclair), Stand Magazine, The Arts Journal (Guyana) and The Caribbean Review of Books.

Capildeo has worked at Oxfam Head Office and for the Oxford Sexual Abuse and Rape Crisis Centre as a volunteer and a volunteer trainer; for the Oxford English Dictionary; and as a teacher at the Universities of Leeds (2009), Greenwich (2009), Sheffield (2009–10), Kingston upon Thames (2010–11), and Glasgow (2012–13). They are a Contributing Editor at the Caribbean Review of Books.

In 2014, Capildeo served as a judge for the Forward Prize, and were part of the team of Commonwealth Writers, the cultural initiative of the Commonwealth Foundation, in 2013–14. They held the 2014 Judith E. Wilson Visiting Fellowship in Poetry at the University of Cambridge and the 2015 Harper-Wood Studentship at St John's College, Cambridge. Capildeo won the Forward Prize for Poetry for Best Collection in 2016. They were Douglas Caster Cultural Fellow in Poetry at the University of Leeds from 2017–19 and 2019–2020 Seamus Heaney Centre Fellow in Poetry at Queen's University Belfast.

Capildeo was 2020 Writer in Residence at the University of the West Indies at St Augustine and 2022 Charles Causley Writer in Residence in Launceston, Cornwall. Capildeo is now Professor and Writer in Residence at the University of York.

== Writing ==
In 2003, Salt Publishing published Capildeo's first collection, a book-length poetry sequence, No Traveller Returns. They subsequently published One Scattered Skeleton, a non-fiction book on the palimpsestic nature of place, memory, and language. One Scattered Skeleton is titled after a poem by the Guyanese poet Martin Carter and moves between the UK, the Caribbean, and Iceland. Extracts from the book have appeared in London: City of Disappearances (ed. Iain Sinclair), Stand Magazine, The Arts Journal (Guyana) and The Caribbean Review of Books.

Person Animal Figure, a set of 45 dramatic monologues in three voices, was published by Landfill Press in 2005. In 2009, Capildeo published their third poetry collection, Undraining Sea: a three-section book that actively engages with William Carlos Williams's Paterson. In 2012, Capildeo published Dark and Unaccustomed Words, which takes its title from George Puttenham's 16th-century Arte of Poesie. This was Puttenham's critical term for arcane or foreign imports into English.

Capildeo's fifth book, Utter, was published by Peepal Tree Press in 2013. In 2015, Shearsman Books published Simple Complex Shapes, written during Capildeo's time as the Judith E. Wilson Poetry Fellow in the Faculty of English, University of Cambridge.

== Reception ==
No Traveller Returns (Salt, 2003) was characterised by Nicholas Laughlin as "a discontinuous meditation on identity and self-awareness. These are merciless poems – mercilessly observant, mercilessly precise".

A fifth book, Utter, was published by Peepal Tree Press in 2013. Reviewing the collection in The Caribbean Review of Books, poet and critic Vivek Narayanan wrote: "What we have here is not a set of conceits, or even concerns, but a system and a mythos entire, one that is delivered to us with such continuous and consistent lyrical intensity, both classical and contemporary, that it can appear as fissures of lightning on the page." Writing in the magazine Tears in the Fence, David Caddy said: "Reading Vahni Capildeo’s Utter ... is an absolute joy, displaying the range and registers that the best of contemporary poetry should exhibit more fully. Capildeo is both Trinidadian and universal."

Jamie Osborn notes that Simplex Complex Shapes "can be taken as a sequence of poems or one long poem describing a series of flights and falls from the moment of a touch in the dark through a day or days, a tangle of time, back into a dreaming sleep."

== Awards ==
Dark and Unaccustomed Words was longlisted for the OCM Bocas Prize for Caribbean Literature in 2013. In 2016, Capildeo became the third Caribbean poet in a row – after Jamaican-born poets Kei Miller and Claudia Rankine – to win the Forward Prize for Poetry for Best Collection, with Measures of Expatriation. The prize chair, Malika Booker, said:

Vahni Capildeo’s Measure of Expatriation is a work that amazes. We found a vertiginous excitement in the way in which the book grasps its subject: the sense of never quite being at home. This is poetry that transforms. When people in the future seek to know what it's like to live between places, traditions, habits and cultures, they will read this. Here is the language for what expatriation feels like.

In 2018, Capildeo received the Cholmondeley Award for poetry from the Society of Authors. In 2019, they were elected a Fellow of the Royal Society of Literature.

In 2025, Capileo was named as the recipient of a Windham-Campbell Literature Prize in the poetry category. In 2025, Capildeo's Polkadot Wounds (2024) won the poetry category of the OCM Bocas Prize for Caribbean Literature and Poetry Book of the Year in Scotland's National Book Awards.

== Bibliography ==
- No Traveller Returns. Salt Publishing, 2003. ISBN 978-1876857882
- Person Animal Figure. Landfill Press, 2005.
- Undraining Sea. Egg Box Publishing, 2009. ISBN 978-0955939907
- All Your Houses. Alice Yard, 2011.
- Dark and Unaccustomed Words, Egg Box Publishing, 2012. ISBN 978-0956928917
- Utter. Peepal Tree Press, 2013. ISBN 978-1845232139
- Simple Complex Shapes. Shearsman Books, 2015. ISBN 9781848614512
- Measures of Expatriation, Carcanet Press, January 2016. ISBN 978-1784101688
- Seas and Trees, Recent Work Press, 2017.
- Venus as a Bear, Carcanet Press, 2018. ISBN 9781784105549.
- Skin Can Hold, Carcanet Press, 2019. ISBN 9781784107321.
- Odyssey Calling, Sad Press, 2020.
- Light Site, Periplum, 2020.
- The Dusty Angel, Oystercatcher, 2021.
- Like a Tree, Walking, Carcanet Press, 2021. ISBN 9781800171954.
- A Happiness, Intergraphia, 2022.
- Polkadot Wounds, Carcanet Press, 2024. ISBN 9781800174252.
