= All Over Again (novel) =

2013 young adult novel by A-dZiko Simba Gegele

All Over Again is a 2014 young adult novel by Jamaican author A-dZiko Simba Gegele. Aimed at teenage readers, it is set in Jamaica and tells the story of a 12-year-old boy going through puberty.

The novel was awarded the inaugural Burt Award for Caribbean Literature in 2014 and was longlisted for the 2015 International Dublin Literary Award.

All Over Again was Gegele's first novel. As of 2018, the author, who is also a poet and spoken-word performer, is working on a second novel, Deep Water, about her work with the Munirah Theatre Company.
