= Rose-Marie Belle Antoine =

Trinidadian legal academic

Professor Rose-Marie Belle Antoine
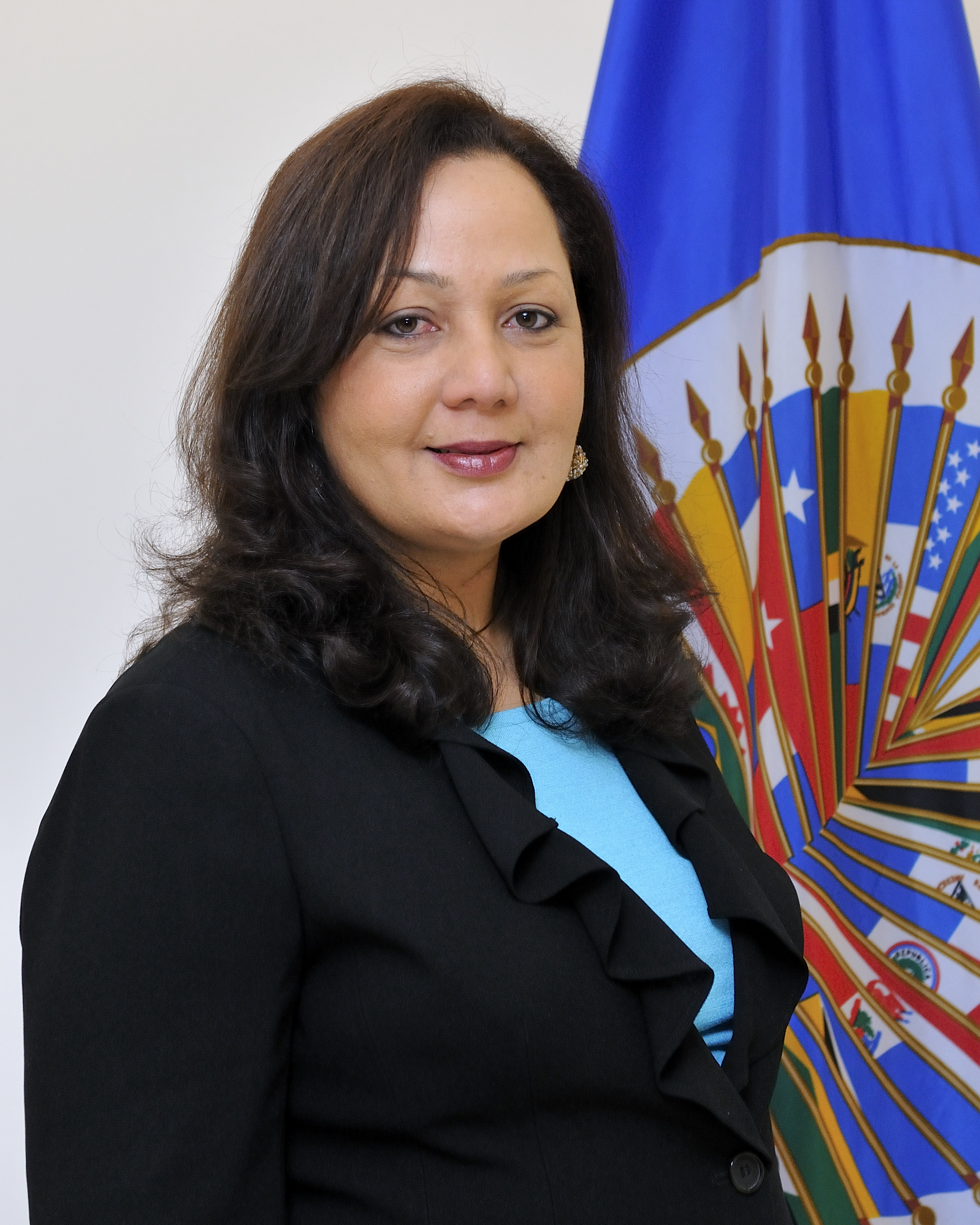
- Antoine in 2014
- Occupations: Pro-Vice-Chancellor and Campus Principal, University of the West Indies at St. Augustine
- Years active: 2022–Present
- Board member of: Commissioner of the Inter-American Commission on Human Rights
- Spouse: Kenny Anthony

Academic background
- Education: St. Joseph's Convent, St. Joseph; University of the West Indies (LLB); University of Cambridge (LLM); University of Oxford (DPhil)

Academic work
- Discipline: Labor law, offshore financial law
- Institutions: University of the West Indies

Rose-Marie Belle Antoine is a Trinidadian academic, attorney-at-law, author and Professor of Labor Law and Offshore Financial Law. She is the current Campus Principal of The University of the West Indies St. Augustine Campus. She previously served as the pro-vice-chancellor of the Board for Graduate Studies and Research at The University of the West Indies. She previously served as regional Dean of the Faculty of Law, the first Dean of the Faculty of Law at St. Augustine, Deputy Dean (Outreach) of the Faculty of Law at St. Augustine from 2004 to 2009, senior lecturer from 1998 to 2004, lecturer in the Faculty of Law at Cave Hill from 1991 to 1998 and temporary lecturer in the Faculty of Law at Cave Hill from 1989 to 1991. She was inaugural Director of the LLM from 2000 to 2002.

In 2008, she was named as one of "60 under 60" distinguished academics at the University of the West Indies. She has also served as an adjunct professor at Case Western Reserve University (2005–2009) and DePaul University (2010–2011). In 2013, she became the only person to have won the regional Vice Chancellor's Award of Excellence, University of the West Indies twice: first, in 2006 for Excellence in research, and in 2013 for Excellence in Public Service.

She also serves as a commissioner of the Inter-American Commission on Human Rights and was elected President of the Commission in 2015.

She works with a number of public and private bodies as a consultant, drafted several laws in the Caribbean, including the Labour Code of Saint Lucia and the CARICOM Harmonization of Labour Law Report.

Antoine was once mistakenly beaten and then arrested by police while trying to protect students at a student protest.

She is an avid singer, dog and plant lover.

== Education ==
Antoine was a student and head girl at St. Joseph's Convent, St. Joseph, Trinidad. She subsequently obtained a Bachelor of Laws degree at the University of the West Indies, where she was the Irvine Hall valedictorian. She then obtained a Master of Laws degree at University of Cambridge, where she was a Pegasus Scholar, and a Doctor of Philosophy degree in law at the University of Oxford.

== Private practice ==
Antoine is a partner in the law firm Anthony & Antoine, a specialist human rights and administrative law firm, a position she has held since 2006.

== Published works ==
Selected published works include:

- Confidentiality in Offshore Financial Law, Oxford University Press.
- Trusts and Tax in Offshore Financial Law, Oxford University Press.
- Law and Legal Systems, Cavendish publishing.
- Unfair Dismissal Digest, ILO
- Legal Issues in Offshore Finance
