= Merle Hodge =

Trinidadian novelist and literary critic (born 1944)

- Born: 1944 (age 81–82); Curepe, Trinidad
- Education: Bishop Anstey High School; University College, London
- Occupations: Novelist and literary critic
- Notable work: Crick Crack, Monkey (1970)
- Awards: Bocas Henry Swanzy Award, 2022

Merle Hodge (born 1944) is a Trinidadian novelist and literary critic. Her 1970 novel, Crick Crack, Monkey, is a classic of West Indian literature, and Hodge is acknowledged as the first black Caribbean woman to have published a major work of fiction.

== Biography ==
Merle Hodge was born in 1944, in Curepe, Trinidad, the daughter of an immigration officer. She received both her elementary and high-school education in Trinidad, and as a student of Bishop Anstey High School, she won the Trinidad and Tobago Girls' Island Scholarship in 1962. The scholarship allowed her to attend University College, London, where she pursued studies in French. In 1965, she completed her B.A. Hons. degree and received a Master of Philosophy degree in 1967, the focus of which concerned the poetry of the French Guyanese writer Léon Damas.

Hodge did quite a bit of travelling after obtaining her degree, working as a typist and baby-sitter to make ends meet. She spent much time in France and Denmark but visited many other countries in both Eastern and Western Europe. After returning to Trinidad in the early 1970s, she taught French for a short time at the junior secondary level. She then received a lecturing position in the French Department at the University of the West Indies (UWI), Jamaica. At UWI, she also began the pursuit of a Ph.D. in French Caribbean Literature. In 1979, Maurice Bishop became prime minister of Grenada, and Hodge went there to work with the Bishop regime. She was appointed director of the development of curriculum, and it was her job to develop and install a socialist education programme. Hodge had to leave Grenada in 1983 because of the execution of Bishop and the resulting U.S. invasion. Hodge is currently working in Women and Development Studies at the University of the West Indies in Trinidad.

In 2022, Hodge and Funso Aiyejina were joint winners of the Bocas Henry Swanzy Award for Distinguished Service to Caribbean Letters.

== Writings and themes ==
Merle Hodge has written three novels: Crick Crack, Monkey (1970), For The Life of Laetitia, published more than two decades later, in 1993, and One Day, One Day, Congotay (2022).

Her first novel, Crick Crack, Monkey, was published in London by André Deutsch in 1970, making Hodge the first black Caribbean woman to land an international publishing deal. concerns the conflicts and changes that a young girl, Tee, faces as she switches from a rural Trinidadian existence with her Aunt Tantie to an urban, anglicized existence with her Aunt Beatrice. With Tee as narrator, Hodge guides the reader through an intensely personal study of the effects of the colonial imposition of various social and cultural values on the Trinidadian female. Tee recounts the various dilemmas in her life in such a way that it is often difficult to separate the voice of the child, experiencing, from the voice of the woman, reminiscing; in this manner, Hodge broadens the scope of the text considerably.

The Life of Laetitia (1993), the story of a young Caribbean girl's first year at school away from home, was well received, one review calling it "a touching, beautifully written coming-of-age story set in Trinidad".

Hodge has also published various essays concerning life in the Caribbean and the life and works of Léon Damas, including a translation of Damas's 1937 collection of poetry, Pigments.

== Published works ==
=== Novels ===
- Crick Crack, Monkey. Andre Deutsch, 1970; London: Heinemann, 1981 (extract "Her True-True Name" in Daughters of Africa, edited by Margaret Busby, 1992); Paris: Karthala, 1982 (French trans. Alice Asselos-Cherdieu).
- For the Life of Laetitia. New York: Farrar Straus Giroux, 1993.
- One Day, One Day, Congotay. Leeds: Peepal Tree Press, 2022.

=== Selected criticism ===
- "Beyond Negritude: The Love Poems", in Critical Perspectives on Léon Gontran Damas, ed. Keith Warner. Washington, DC: Three Continents, 1988. From her unpublished thesis, "The Writings of Léon Damas and Their Connection with the Négritude Movement in Literature", University of London, 1967.
- "The Folktales of Bernard Dadie", in Black Images: A Critical Quarterly on Black Arts and Culture 3:3 (1974), pp. 57–63.
- "The Shadow of the Whip: A Comment on Male-Female Relations in the Caribbean", in Is Massa Day Dead? Black Moods in the Caribbean, ed. Orde Coombs. New York: Anchor Books, 1974, pp. 111–18.
- "Social Conscience or Exoticism? Two Novels from Guadalupe", in Revista Review Interamericana 4 (1974), pp. 391–401.
- "Novels on the French Caribbean Intellectual in France", in Revista Review Interamericana 6 (1976), pp. 211–31.
- "Young Women and the Development of Stable Family Life in the Caribbean", in Savacou 13 (Gemini 1977), pp. 39–44.
- "Challenges of the Struggle for Sovereignty: Changing the World versus Writing Stories", in Caribbean Women Writers: Essays from the First International Conference, ed. Selwyn R. Cudjoe. Wellesley: Calaloux, 1990, pp. 202–08.
- "The Language of Earl Lovelace", in Anthurium: A Caribbean Studies Journal, Vol. 4, Issue 2, Fall 2006.
