= Kevin Jared Hosein =

Novelist from Trinidad and Tobago (born 1986)

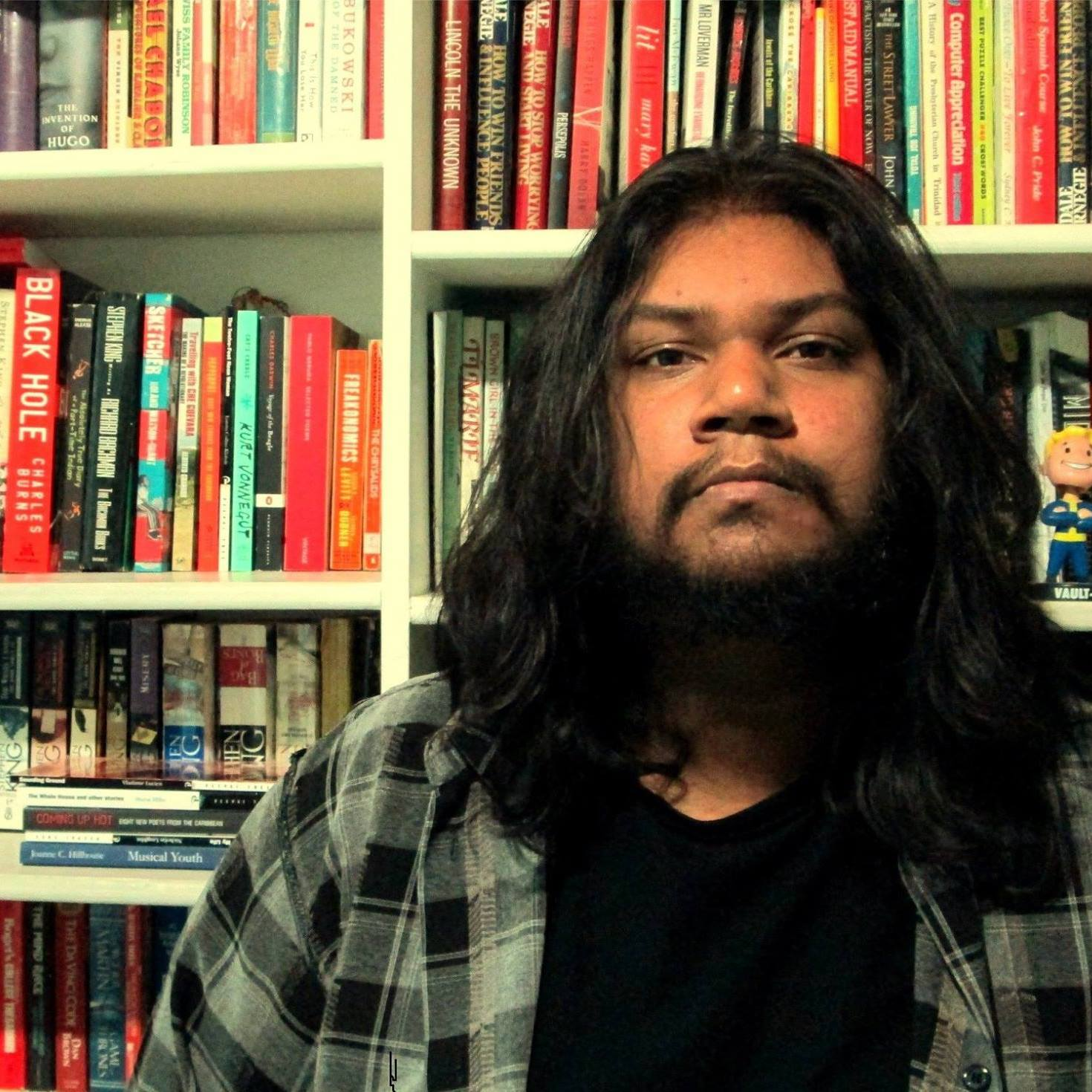
- Born: 1986 (age 39–40); Chaguanas, Trinidad and Tobago
- Education: University of the West Indies, St. Augustine
- Occupation: Writer
- Notable work: Hungry Ghosts (2023)
- Awards: Commonwealth Short Story Prize (2018), OCM Bocas Prize for Fiction (2024), Walter Scott Prize for Historical Fiction (2024)

Kevin Jared Hosein (born 1986) is a Caribbean writer from Trinidad and Tobago. He writes novels, books for children and young adults, and short stories. His writing has appeared in Granta, Lightspeed magazine, Wasafiri, and on BBC Radio 4. He has twice been longlisted for the International Dublin Literary Award. He has been the runner up for the Burt Award for Caribbean Literature for young adults and has won the Commonwealth Short Story Prize, the OCM Bocas Prize for Fiction, and the Walter Scott Prize for Historical Fiction.

== Early life and education ==
Kevin Jared Hosein was born in Trinidad and Tobago in 1986 in an Indo-Trinidadian family.

As a young child, he was not initially interested in reading, but was more into video games, especially those with story-heavy plots. Later on in his childhood, Hosein became deeply interested in books and writing, particularly authors such as Stephen King and Cormac McMarthy. In Caribbean literature, the 1972 novel No Pain Like This Body, written by Harold “Sonny” Ladoo, had a large influence on Hosein's interest in reading and writing.

Due to literature not being offered as a subject option at his secondary school, Hosein obtained a degree in biology and environmental studies at the University of the West Indies at St. Augustine. He worked as a school biology teacher for over a decade.

== Career ==
=== Short stories and novels ===
In 2013, Hosein's story "The Monkey Trap" was featured in Pepperpot: Best New Stories from the Caribbean. It was also shortlisted for the Small Axe Literary Prize. In 2015, he won the Caribbean regional category of the Commonwealth Short Story Prize for his story "The King of Settlement 4".

In 2018, he won the overall Commonwealth Short Story Prize for his story "Passage". The judging panel included Damon Galgut, Sunila Galappatti, Kateri Akiwenzie-Damm, Mark McWatt, Paula Morris, and Sarah Hall, who was the chair. Hosein received his £5,000 prize on 2 July 2018, in Cyprus. "Passage" is written in Trinidadian Creole. It follows a forester's quest to find a family living outside society in the mountains of Trinidad. It depicts a natural world that is both brutal and exploited by humans. The story's ecological details draw on Hosein's biology and environmental science education, as well as his own experience of walking in the forests.

Hosein published his first novel for adults, Hungry Ghosts, in 2023. The novel won pre-publication praise from Hilary Mantel ("a deeply impressive book… and an important one") and Bernardine Evaristo ("An astonishing novel – linguistically gorgeous, narratively propulsive and psychologically profound"). Reviewing it for The Times, Claire Allfree called Hungry Ghosts a "sumptuous, brilliantly written novel". The title refers to pretas, an ancient Hindu tradition that people who commit certain sins transform after death into beings with very small mouths and very large appetites. It is set in rural Trinidad in the 1940s, and features the impoverished Saroops and the wealthy farm-owning Changoors. Their lives become intertwined when Dalton Changoor disappears. In 2024, the novel was longlisted for the Dylan Thomas Prize, for writers under the age of forty, and won the OCM Bocas Prize for Fiction and the Walter Scott Prize for Historical Fiction.

=== Books for children and young adults ===
Hosein has published three works of fiction for children and young adults: Littletown Secrets, The Beast of Kukuyo and The Repenters.

Littletown Secrets (2013) was his first published book. He both wrote and illustrated the book, which tells of a young boy who charges to keep other children's secrets. It was named Best Children's Book of 2013 by the Trinidad Guardian.

The Repenters (2016) tells the story of Jordan Sant, who is placed in a children's home after the murder of his parents, and later runs away to Port of Spain. It was longlisted for the International Dublin Literary Award and the OCM Bocas Prize for Fiction.

His 2018 book, The Beast of Kukuyo, in which a 15-year-old girl investigates the disappearance of her classmate in a quiet rural village in Trinidad, won second place in the Burt Award for Caribbean Literature for young adults. It was longlisted for the International Dublin Literary Award.

=== Other work ===
Hosein's poem "The Wait is So, So Long" was turned into a short film that received a Gold Key at the New York-based Scholastic Art & Writing Awards.

== Works ==
=== Novels ===
- Hungry Ghosts, Bloomsbury Publishing, 2023, ISBN 978-1526644480.

=== For children/young adults ===
- Littletown Secrets, 2013.
- The Repenters, Peepal Tree Press, 2016, ISBN 978-1845233310.
- The Beast of Kukuyo, Blouse & Skirt Books, 2018 ISBN 978-9768267153.
