= Media and Editorial Projects Limited =

- Founded: 1991; 35 years ago
- Founder: Jeremy Taylor
- Country of origin: Trinidad and Tobago
- Headquarters location: Port of Spain
- Publication types: Books; Magazines
- Imprints: Prospect Press (1994–2008)
- No. of employees: 10
- Official website: www.meppublishers.com

Media and Editorial Projects Limited (MEP or MEP Caribbean Publishers) is a private publishing company based in Port of Spain, Trinidad and Tobago.

== History ==
The company was established in 1991 by Jeremy Taylor and Joanne Mendes. Its board of directors includes Managing Director Taylor; Financial Director Mendes; Chairman Susan Dore; and Caroline Taylor. Hugh Williams served as Secretary from the company's founding until his death in 2016.

MEP currently publishes Caribbean Beat (the inflight magazine of Caribbean Airlines bimonthly, and the free destination guide Discover Trinidad & Tobago annually.

Past publications have focused on Trinidad & Tobago and/or Caribbean business, culture or tourism, including the bimonthly subscription-based newsletter ENERGY Caribbean; Trinidad & Tobago Business Guide; the Caribbean Review of Books (CRB) (now an independent non-profit entity); Youth At Risk (for the UNDP: United Nations Development Programme); The Point Lisas Story; the Citibank Investment Guide to Trinidad & Tobago; BWIA's Caribbean; The ALM Caribbean Explorer; Hi-Time; Trinidad & Tobago Destination Guide; the Trinidad & Tobago Exporter; and the Trinidad & Tobago Export Directory.

=== Imprints ===
In 1994, the company established a book imprint called Prospect Press. It ceased operations in 2008. From 1994 to 2008, it published books on Trinidad & Tobago and/or Caribbean biography, art, and natural history, including:

- Julian Kenny, Views from the Ridge (2008 reprint, ISBN 976-95057-0-6), Flowers of Trinidad & Tobago (2006, ISBN 976-95057-8-1), Orchids of Trinidad & Tobago (2008, ISBN 978-976-95082-4-8) and A Naturalist's Notes: the Biological Diversity of Trinidad & Tobago (2008, ISBN 978-976-95082-3-1)
- Ken Bhoodoo, The Elusive Eric Williams (2002, ISBN 976-95057-2-2)
- Luise Kimme, Halcyon Days: Sculpture 1987–91 (2002, ISBN 976-95057-3-0), Resurrection To Dance (2003, ISBN 976-95057-6-5), and Bolero
- C. L. R. James, Letters From London (2003, ISBN 976-95057-4-9)
- Richard French, A Naturalist's Year (2007, ISBN 976-95082-0-9)
- Jeremy Taylor, Going to Ground (1994, ISBN 976-8052-08-2)
- Russell Barrow, Birds of Trinidad and Tobago: A Photographic Atlas
- Stewart Hylton Edwards, The Toco Road and other Poems of the West Indies
- Wilfred Best, Tikasingh's Wedding
- The Abbey: Mount St. Benedict
- The Institute of Marine Affairs (IMA), Wetlands of Trinidad and Tobago (2010, ISBN 978-976-95082-6-2)
- Joy Rudder, The Old House and the Dream: The Story of the Asa Wright Nature Centre (2009, ISBN 976-95082-1-7)
