= Julian Kenny =

Trinidad and Tobago biologist and senator (1930–2011)

Julian Stanley Kenny
- Born: January 27, 1930; Woodbrook, Port of Spain, Trinidad and Tobago
- Died: August 9, 2011 (aged 81)
- Citizenship: Trinidad and Tobago
- Education: Birkbeck College, University of London
- Scientific career
- Fields: Zoology
- Workplaces: University of the West Indies

Julian Stanley "Jake" Kenny (January 27, 1930 – August 9, 2011) was a Trinidadian zoologist, columnist, author and Professor of Zoology at the St. Augustine Campus of the University of the West Indies and an Independent Senator in the fifth (1995–2000) and sixth (2001) Parliaments. He is best known for his work on freshwater fishes and anurans, and for his contribution to the conservation movement in Trinidad and Tobago.

Kenny was born in Trinidad, and was educated at Belmont Intermediate School and then at St Mary's. After completing Grade 13 at Ridley College in St. Catharines, Canada, he received a Bachelor of Arts from the University of Toronto. After working at a fisheries laboratory in Canada, Kenny returned to Trinidad where he worked as a scientific officer in what would later become the Fisheries Division. After working there for nine years, he entered Birbeck College, University of London, where he obtained a PhD. After graduating he joined the Department of Biological Sciences at the St. Augustine Campus of the University of the West Indies. After retiring from the department, Kenny served as Chairman of the Trustees of the Guardian Life Wildlife Fund. Between 1995 and 2001 he served as an Independent Senator.

He authored several books about Trinidad and Tobago's ecology, first with Macmillan and then with Media and Editorial Projects Limited book imprint, Prospect Press. His titles include:

- Native Orchids of the Eastern Caribbean (Caribbean Pocket Natural History Series) (1998, ISBN 978-0-333-47330-6)
- Views from the Ridge (2008 reprint, ISBN 976-95057-0-6)
- Flowers of Trinidad & Tobago (2006, ISBN 976-95057-8-1)
- Orchids of Trinidad & Tobago (2008, ISBN 978-976-95082-4-8)
- A Naturalist's Notes: the Biological Diversity of Trinidad & Tobago (2008, ISBN 978-976-95082-3-1)

Kenny also wrote a column for the Trinidad and Tobago Express newspaper. He died in Port of Spain, aged 81.
