= Caroline Taylor =

Caroline Taylor is an actor, singer, director, writer and marketer from Trinidad and Tobago.

Taylor was born in Port of Spain, Trinidad and Tobago and won a T&T National Scholarship for Languages in 2000 while at St. Joseph’s Convent Port of Spain, and a Commonwealth Scholarship (Commonwealth Scholarship and Fellowship Plan) in 2009. She received a Bachelor of Arts degree in Performance Studies from Williams College, and a Master of Arts degree in drama from Goldsmiths, University of London.

Taylor's performing arts work has included theatre, musicals, opera and film performances as an actor, singer and director in Trinidad, the United Kingdom and the United States, where she was reportedly the first Trinidadian to write and perform a show at the New York International Fringe Festival in New York City. She co-wrote the 2007 documentary series Iere Vibe on C TV; has been the editor of Discover Trinidad and Tobago; and writes for Caribbean Beat.
