= Brooklyn Caribbean Literary Festival =

Annual literary festival in New York City

- Nickname: B.C.L.F.
- Genre: Literary
- Frequency: Annually
- Locations: Brooklyn, New York
- Founded: 2019; 7 years ago
- Founder: Marsha Massiah
- Filing status: 501(c)(3)
- Sponsor: Brooklyn Arts Council (BAC) New York University (SPS) Hawthornden Foundation
- Website: www.bklyncbeanlitfest.org/about

The Brooklyn Caribbean Literary Festival (BCLF) is an annual literary and cultural festival held each September in Brooklyn, New York City. Established in 2019, it is the only literary festival in the United States dedicated exclusively to Caribbean literature. Founded within the epicenter of Brooklyn’s West Indian Americans, the neighborhood known as Little Caribbean, Brooklyn, the festival highlights Caribbean literature and the region’s history of storytelling to United States audiences and, by extension, to wider global audiences.It has gathered more than 250 writers, including Jamaica Kincaid, Lorna Goodison, Esmeralda Santiago, Velma Pollard, Hilary Beckles, and Safiya Sinclair.

== Background ==
The BCLF was founded by Marsha Massiah, a Trinidad native based in Brooklyn, who chose the borough as the festival’s base as it is home to the largest community of people of Caribbean ancestry outside the West Indies.

The BCLF ascribes to a geographic definition of the Caribbean that includes all countries whose borders are washed by the Caribbean Sea, making its creative catchment area one that mirrors the movement and exchange of indigenous peoples prior to the Columbian encounter.

=== History ===
The organisation’s first venture into the literary world in 2019 was as the Emergent Writers Contest, a short story competition for unpublished writers whose primary mission was to unearth hidden storytellers of Caribbean descent in the North American diaspora.

The 2020 and 2021 festivals were held virtually due to the COVID-19 pandemic. In 2022, the fourth annual festival returned to in-person programming under the theme “We Outside!”, a characteristically Caribbean expression capturing the joyous feeling of reunion following a prolonged lockdown, with events at venues including the Center for Fiction and the Rogers Garden.

The fifth annual festival, held from September 7-10, 2023, expanded to four days and included panel discussions, a film screening, a Kalinda workshop, and poetry readings.

The 2024 festival, themed “Faces of the Caribbean,” was held from September 5 at venues including the Center for Fiction and the Weeksville Heritage Center.

The 2025 festival, “Root & Remedy: Prescriptions for an Uncertain World,” held September 5-7, devoted to stories of rituals and remedies.

The 2026 festival, themed “One Hand Don’t Clap,” is scheduled for September 9-13.

== BCLF Short Fiction Story Contest ==
The BCLF Short Fiction Story Contest is an annual writing competition aimed at unearthing and encouraging the distinctive voice and story of the Caribbean-descended writer and expanding the creative writing landscape of Caribbean literature. It began in 2019 as the Emergent Writers Contest, limited to unpublished writers of Caribbean descent in North America. In 2020, after receiving entries from writers based in the Caribbean region itself, the competition was renamed and a second prize was introduced specifically for writers residing in the Caribbean.

Both prizes are awarded in the name of Dr. Elizabeth Nunez, a Trinidadian-American author, distinguished professor, and longstanding patron of the festival. The two prizes are: the BCLF Elizabeth Nunez Caribbean-American Writer’s Prize, open to unpublished writers of Caribbean heritage in the United States and Canada; and the BCLF Elizabeth Nunez Award for Writers in the Caribbean, open to writers of all levels who reside and work in the Caribbean or are on temporary assignment overseas.

Dr. Nunez served as the festival’s chief adviser and patron. Born in 1944 in Cocorite, Trinidad, she immigrated to the United States at nineteen, earned her PhD from New York University in 1977, and became a Distinguished Professor of English at Medgar Evers College, City University of New York, where she was credited with creating and initiating a variety of academic programmes. She also served as executive producer for the CUNY television series Black Writers in America.

== Notable featured writers ==
Since its founding, the BCLF has featured writers including Jamaica Kincaid, Lorna Goodison, Esmeralda Santiago, Velma Pollard, Sir Hilary Beckles, Safiya Sinclair, Julia Alvarez, Edwidge Danticat, Roxane Gay, Kei Miller, Jason Allen-Paisant, Lauren K. Alleyne, Lauren Francis-Sharma, Maisy Card, and Kaitlyn Greenidge, among others.
