= Roshan Parasram =

Trinidadian physician and public health consultant

Doctor Roshan Parasram

Chief Medical Officer for Trinidad and Tobago
- Preceded by: Anton Cumberbatch

Personal details
- Born: Roshan Akash Parasram; May 8, 1978 (age 48) Couva, Trinidad and Tobago
- Education: London School of Hygiene & Tropical Medicine; University of the West Indies; Osgoode Hall Law School
- Occupation: Physician and Public Health Consultant

Roshan Akash Parasram (born May 8, 1978) is a Trinidadian physician and public health consultant, who is the current Chief Medical Officer (CMO) for Trinidad and Tobago since 2013/14. Prior to his appointment as Chief Medical Officer, Parasram was a Primary Care Physician II (PCP II); a District Medical Officer (DMO); a County Medical Officer of Health (CMOH) at the Ministry of Health and the former Specialist Medical Officer (SMO), Insect Vector Control Division.

Parasram has been taking a leading role in response to the COVID-19 pandemic in Trinidad and Tobago, alongside Health Minister Terrence Deyalsingh and Communications Minister Donna Cox.

== Early life and education ==
Parasram, the nephew of religious leader and medical doctor Rampersad Parasram, and son of Lakshmipersad Parasram and Indra Parasram, studied at Presentation College, Chaguanas. Following this, he was educated at the Faculty of Medicine, University of the West Indies at St. Augustine (M.B., B.S., 2002) and the London School of Hygiene & Tropical Medicine, University of London (P.G.Dip. Public Health, 2007; M.Sc. Public Health, 2009). He is also a Fellow of the Royal Society of Public Health (FRSPH, UK). Parasram holds a certificate in Public Procurement Law and Practice.

== Career ==
=== Government ===
Parasram worked as a medical intern from 2002 to 2004; primary care physician (PCP) at the North Central Regional Health Authority; District Medical Officer (DMO); specialist medical officer, head of department of Insect Vector Control Division and county medical officer of health (CMOH) at the Ministry of Health of Trinidad and Tobago.

=== Chief Medical Officer for Trinidad and Tobago ===
Parasram has been taking a lead role in the Trinidad and Tobago Government's response to the COVID-19 pandemic in Trinidad and Tobago.

Parasram took part in his first Trinidad and Tobago Government press briefing on 12 March 2020 alongside Health Minister Terrence Deyalsingh, National Security Minister, Stuart Young and Communications Minister, Donna Cox.

Government offices
Preceded by Anton Cumberbatch	Chief Medical Officer for Trinidad and Tobago; 2013/14–present	Succeeded by Incumbent
