= Marjorie Thorpe =

Trinidadian academic and former diplomat

- Born: Marjorie Ruth Thorpe; Tunapuna, Trinidad
- Education: Bishop Anstey High School; McGill University; Queen's University
- Occupations: Academic, development practitioner, diplomat

Marjorie Ruth Thorpe is a Trinidadian academic, lecturer, former diplomat and the first woman to have chaired the Public Service Commission (PSC) in Trinidad and Tobago. She is also a development practitioner with a particular interest in gender issues.

== Biography ==
=== Early years and education ===
Marjorie Thorpe was born and grew up in Tunapuna, Trinidad, and attended Bishop Anstey High School in Port of Spain. She went on to study at McGill University in Montreal, Quebec, Canada, where she attained a BA in English in 1963 and an MA in English Literature in 1965. Subsequently joining the English Department at the University of the West Indies, St. Augustine, she was awarded a Canadian International Development Agency Fellowship to Queen's University in Canada, where she completed a PhD in Literature in 1975.

=== Career ===
Marjorie Thorpe was on the faculty of the University of the West Indies (UWI) for more than 20 years. She served two terms at head of the English Department at UWI's St Augustine campus between 1979 and 1985, and was Vice-Dean and then as Dean of the Faculty of Arts and General Studies between 1985 and 1988. She pioneered the introduction of the first Women and Development Studies Course at UWI and later served as Coordinator of the Women and Development Studies Programme.

From 1988 to 1992, she was Trinidad and Tobago's Ambassador and Permanent Representative to the United Nations, and from 1992 to 1995 was deputy director of the United Nations Development Fund for Women (UNIFEM). She was also Resident Coordinator of the UN System Operational Activities for Barbados and the Eastern Caribbean, and Resident Representative of UNDP for the same area. She has also served on the boards of national and international organizations, including the Police Service Commission of Trinidad and Tobago, as well as Republic Bank, where she was the first woman appointed in 17 years.

In 2013, she became the first woman to chair Trinidad and Tobago's Public Service Commission.

A participant at many conferences, Thorpe has delivered papers and keynote addresses on subject areas including gender, development and Caribbean literature, and among other writings contributed an Introduction to the Heinemann Educational Books edition of Earl Lovelace's novel The Wine of Astonishment. She has in addition played significant roles in creative writing initiatives in the region, including as coordinator for the Commonwealth Writers Prize, vice-chair of the judges panel of the OCM Bocas Prize for Caribbean Literature and on the organizing committee of the NGC Bocas Lit Fest.

== Awards ==
Marjorie Thorpe is the recipient of fellowships and honours that include the degree of Doctor of Letters, honoris causa, from the University of the West Indies in 2015, "for her dedication and service to UWI, the country and the region".
