= Ian Randle =

Jamaican publisher (born 1949)

Ian Randle OD
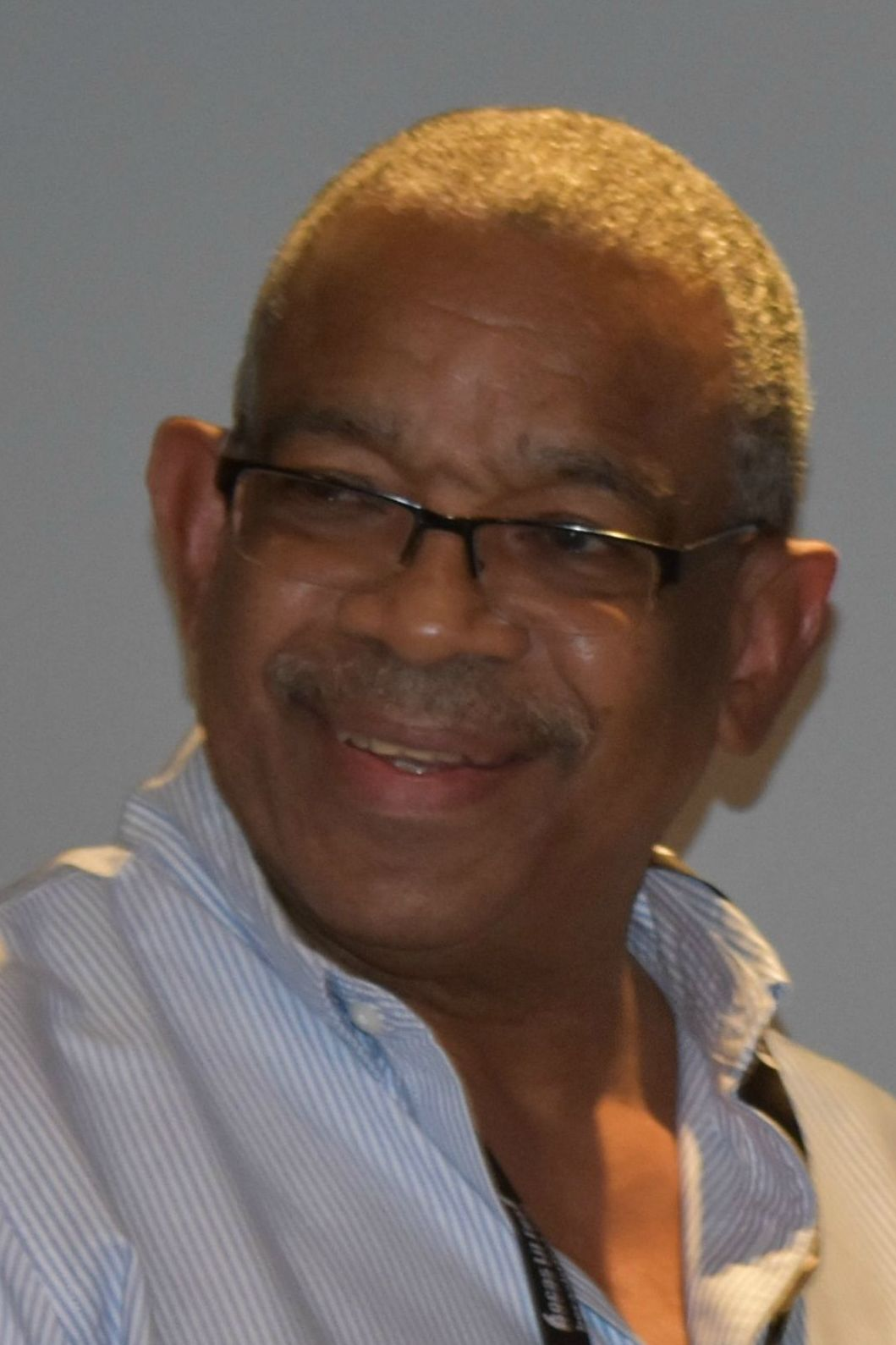
- Randle in 2019
- Born: 7 July 1949 (age 77); Hanover Parish, Colony of Jamaica, British Empire
- Education: University of the West Indies; University of Southampton (MSc)
- Occupation: Publisher
- Known for: Founder of Ian Randle Publishers
- Awards: Order of Distinction 2002; Prince Claus Award 2012; Honorary LLD degree, University of the West Indies, St Augustine, Trinidad, 2013; Doctor Bird Award, 2018; Bocas Henry Swanzy Award 2019
- Website: ianrandlepublishers.com

Ian Randle OD (born 7 July 1949) is a Jamaican publisher. He is the founder of an eponymous independent publishing company whose main focus is on English-language readers. He has won awards including the Prince Claus Award in 2012 and the 2019 Bocas Henry Swanzy Award for distinguished service to Caribbean letters.

== Life ==
Randle was born in Green Island, Hanover Parish on Jamaica in 1949, the eldest of his parents' three boys and two girls. He studied for a Special Honours degree in history at the Mona campus of the University of the West Indies, Jamaica, and later for an MSc degree in international politics at the University of Southampton, UK, on a Commonwealth scholarship. After his academic study, he worked many years for British publishers until he set up his own firm, Ian Randle Publishers (IRP), in 1990. This start made him the first English-language publisher of scholarly books in the Caribbean, publishing books on and about the region since 1991. Later, his firm became a model for particularly the African book scene.

=== Ian Randle Publishers ===
At first, Randle focused on history and the social sciences, which allowed young academics to publish their findings locally. As a result, the region became less dependent on writers from the United Kingdom, the colonizer of Jamaica until 1962. In later years Randle expanded the range of books to include biography, culture, cookery, and sports, while producing texts for undergraduate-level students and the upper levels of the Caribbean secondary school system. His list contains the most comprehensive offerings on the Regional Integration Movement and on the Caribbean Community (CARICOM). His published list contains over 350 printed titles and some electronic editions.

The direction of the firm is now in the hands of Randle's daughter Christine, while he himself has continued in fields such as marketing, public relations and consultancy.

In 2000, Randle helped establish the Caribbean Publishers Network (CAPNET) and became its first president, serving for two two-year terms, during which he established links with the international publishing community and with publishers in Africa through the sister organization APNET. During this period Randle contributed regularly to the University of Denver Publishing Institute delivering the annual lecture on international publishing and presenting papers in a variety of international publishing and education fora.

== Recognition ==
His pioneering work was recognized by the government of Jamaica when he was conferred with the Order of Distinction in 2002. In 2012, Randle was honoured with a Prince Claus Award from the Netherlands for his contribution to Caribbean intellectual property and for championing independent local publishing and self-representation in other post-colonial contexts. Earlier that year, the Caribbean magazine Tallawah included him on the list of most influential Jamaicans. In 2013, he received an Honorary Doctor of Laws (LLD) degree from the University of the West Indies, St Augustine campus in Trinidad, for his contribution to Trinidad and Tobago and the Caribbean. In the same year, he received the Trailblazers Award from the Book Industry Association of Jamaica.

In March 2019, Randle was announced as the recipient of the Bocas Henry Swanzy Award, which was presented on 5 May 2019 at the NGC Bocas Lit Fest in Port of Spain, Trinidad.
