= Caribbean Review of Books =

Literary magazine based in Trinidad

The Caribbean Review of Books CRB
- Discipline: Caribbean literature
- Language: English
- Edited by: Nicholas Laughlin

Standard abbreviations
- ISO 4: Caribb. Rev. Books

Indexing
- ISSN: 1811-4873
- OCLC no.: 56954451

Links
- Journal homepage; Antilles blog Online access

The Caribbean Review of Books, or CRB, is a literary magazine based in Port of Spain, Trinidad, reviewing books of Caribbean interest—by Caribbean authors or about the Caribbean—and publishing original fiction, poetry, and other literary material. It is the second periodical to use this name.

== The first Caribbean Review of Books, 1991–94 ==
The original Caribbean Review of Books was founded in 1991 by the University of the West Indies Publishers' Association (UWIPA) in Mona, Jamaica, from where it was published quarterly until 1994. Edited by Samuel B. Bandara, acquisition librarian at the university, the publication was intended to be "the complete source for Caribbean book news" (as stated below the masthead of Issue number 1, dated August 1991, and on subsequent issues), and combined book reviews with bibliographical information, interviews, and other features.

When some crucial UWIPA resources were absorbed into the newly founded University of the West Indies Press in 1993 and no external funding could be secured, The Caribbean Review of Books ceased publication.

== The revived Caribbean Review of Books, 2004– ==
A revival of The Caribbean Review of Books was one of the early objectives of the Caribbean Publishers Network (Capnet), founded in 2000. When external funding again proved difficult, one of Capnet's founding members, a small publishing house in Trinidad called Media and Editorial Projects Limited (MEP) decided to take responsibility for the project.

In May 2004, under publisher Jeremy Taylor and editor Nicholas Laughlin, the new Caribbean Review of Books—CRB for short—was launched as a quarterly magazine aimed at a general readership, supported by subscriptions and advertising. Its primary content was reviews mainly fiction, poetry, biography, history, and current affairs books, as well as books about art and culture.

The CRB became an independent non-profit organisation in 2006, and secured a grant from the Prince Claus Foundation, and continued support from MEP. However, like its predecessor, the CRB suspended print publishing in mid-2009. It was re-launched in May 2010 as an online publication, to coincide with its sixth anniversary.

In November 2013, the CRB began a partnership with the Bocas Lit Fest, Trinidad and Tobago's annual literature festival, while maintaining its editorial independence.
