= National Library and Information System =

National library of Trinidad and Tobago

National Library and Information Service (NALIS)
- Location: 23 Abercromby Street, Port of Spain, Trinidad
- Type: Public Library of Trinidad & Tobago
- Established: 1998; 28 years ago
- Branches: 23

Collection
- Items collected: business directories, phone books, maps, government publications, books, ebooks, periodicals, genealogy, local history

Other information
- Website: nalis.gov.tt

The National Library and Information System of Trinidad and Tobago (known as NALIS) is a corporate body established by the NALIS Act No. 18 of 1998 to administer the development and coordination of library and information services in Trinidad and Tobago.

As a statutory authority under the Ministry of Communication, NALIS is governed by a board which ensures proper and efficient performance of the functions of the organisation. NALIS is managed by an executive director assisted by a deputy executive director and directors of its various divisions.

NALIS provides library and information services at the Heritage Library (located in the National Library Building, Port-of-Spain), 23 public libraries, 4 mobile libraries, 66 special libraries, 133 secondary and 483 primary school libraries, 25 ECCE centres. Library services are also provided through its website at www.nalis.gov.tt and its social media sites: the blog, Facebook, Twitter and YouTube.

The National Library of Trinidad and Tobago, located at Hart and Abercromby Streets in Port of Spain, is the administrative seat and focal point of NALIS' libraries and information service centres in Trinidad and Tobago.

== History ==
The Public Library Service began in Port of Spain in 1851, the Carnegie Free Library was established in San Fernando in 1919, and the Central Library Service was introduced at the Ministry of Education in 1949. These three organisations were responsible for the administration of library services in Trinidad and Tobago until 1998. On 18 September 1998, the Government of Trinidad and Tobago repealed the Acts that governed these three separate bodies and established the National Library and Information System Authority (NALIS) as a Statutory Authority under the NALIS Act, No. 18 of 1998 entitled:

“An Act to establish the National Library and Information System, to provide for the development and co-ordination of all library and information services in Trinidad and Tobago and related matters.”

This Act brought together the administration and management of all libraries in the public sector, that is, public, special and school libraries, under an independent Board - the NALIS Authority. The three (3) existing Public Libraries (the Public Library of Trinidad, the Carnegie Free Library and the Central Library of Trinidad and Tobago) and their resources of buildings and stock were transferred to the new Authority.

The Act also gave to NALIS the responsibility to manage the national human resources of library and information science personnel in Public Service bodies; this was brought about through the transfer of staff from the Public Service and the Statutory Authorities Service Commissions to NALIS.

Under the Act, NALIS has the authority generally to administer funds allocated by Parliament, raise funds, recruit and manage staff and manage all resources and library infrastructure, such as buildings and bookmobiles.

NALIS cooperates with libraries in Tobago that fall under the Tobago House of Assembly.

== The Library Professional ==
The key component in the information-seeking/ information-providing chain is the information professional who provides the community with information resources in whatever format available: books, magazines videos, CD-ROMs, DVDs and websites. The traditional duties of librarians are being redefined from accessing paper records and books to using the most advanced technologies. A librarian must do more than check out books; they are technology experts, researchers, managers, literacy experts, children's storytellers, community programme coordinators and reading advisors. Within NALIS, librarians often specialize in one service, such as, children, young adult, systems and acquisition.

Librarians require specialized education in Library and Information Science at either the Undergraduate or Postgraduate levels. Other positions such as Library Assistants and Technicians range from O’Levels to associate degree qualifications.

== The National Library ==
The National Library of Trinidad and Tobago stands juxtaposed to three historic landmarks: The Holy Trinity Cathedral, the Red House and Woodford Square in downtown Port of Spain. This state-of-the-art library facility is the administrative seat and focal point of NALIS’ libraries and information service centres in Trinidad and Tobago.

The National Library houses the offices of the executive director, the deputy executive director, the Management Team, the divisions of Finance, Human Resource Management, Educational Library Services and Information Networks. The building also houses the departments of Public Relations and Marketing, Research, Planning and Development, Technical Services and the offices of the Corporate Secretary and Senior Internal Auditor.

The National Library offers Heritage, Adult, Young Adult and Children's library services. It is the prime centre for information needs whether for research, leisure or entertainment. Journals can be read in a relaxed atmosphere, patrons can borrow books, listen to lectures, surf the Internet or find out about Trinidad and Tobago and Caribbean history, people and places. Conveniently, there is a Rituals Coffee House on the premises which serves hot and cold beverages and snacks.

The seminar rooms, Audio Visual Room, open-air Amphitheatre and other exhibition areas are fully utilized by NALIS and other organisations for lectures, seminars, book launches, other literary events and for significant exhibitions. The annual NGC Bocas Literary Festival and the Trinidad and Tobago Film Festival often have events scheduled at the National Library, and the Adult Literacy Tutors Association (ALTA) conducts regular adult literacy classes at the National Library Building.

== The Heritage Library ==
The Heritage Library of the National Library and Information System Authority (NALIS) evolved from the integration in 1994 of the West Indian Reference Library of the Central Library Services of Trinidad and Tobago and the West Indian Reference Section of the Trinidad Public Library. Ms. Pearl Eintou Springer served as the first director of the Heritage Library Division from October 1993 until her retirement in 2003. Under her stewardship, the Heritage Library was placed in the centre of the community, presenting the society to itself through a rich collection of information on Trinidad and Tobago and the Caribbean by extension. Her work was continued by Mrs. Joan Osborne, director of Heritage Library from 2003 to 2012. They succeeded in transforming the Heritage Library into a notable institution, intimately involved in culture, the arts, history and literature on Trinidad and Tobago and the Caribbean.

The Heritage Library is committed to the preservation of the nation's Heritage Collections and building of the oral history records. Its main role, therefore, is to acquire, preserve and promote information in all formats, on or about Trinidad and Tobago. In addition, the Heritage Library houses the Legal Deposit items and acts as a national depository and resource for materials published in Trinidad and Tobago.

The goal of the Heritage Library is to preserve and promote the culture of Trinidad and Tobago by staging educational programmes, exhibitions and displays commemorating national festivals throughout the year. It also provides a support base and information center for the branch libraries. It facilitates this role by providing repackaged information/materials, and organizing and disseminating all information on various national heritage exhibitions about our nation's diverse ethnic groups and cultures. The Heritage Library also regularly hosts Caribbean Research Workshops to expose students to the availability of various Caribbean resources and to train them in their use.

In addition to hosting lectures, workshops, exhibitions and displays, the Heritage Library has managed NALIS’ First Time Authors Appreciation Programme (initiated in 2009). The First Time Authors Appreciation Programme is designed to encourage writers to have their works published and to raise public awareness of the issues involved in the protection of intellectual property as well as the enforcement of copyright.

== Public Libraries ==
There are twenty-five Public Libraries in Trinidad and Tobago. Twenty-two libraries, in addition to the Mobile Library Service for the North and South Regions, are administered by the Public Libraries Division located at the NALIS headquarters in Port of Spain, Trinidad. The three libraries in Tobago are administered by the Tobago House of Assembly. NALIS also administers three Libraries in Correctional Institutions in accordance with the guidelines for library services for disadvantaged persons as recommended by the International Federation of Library Associations and Instuitions (IFLA). The Public Libraries provide several key services to the public, such as the following:

Youth Literacy Project: The Youth Literacy Project aims to provide effective literacy instruction to students in primary or secondary schools with literacy challenges. The Adult Tutors Literacy Association (ALTA) provides the literacy instruction at 10 public libraries to individuals aged 12–15 years and, where the feeder schools are primary and not secondary, children 9–11 years. In 2012, 62 students graduated and to date a total of 185 young people have improved their literacy skills and received certification.

Computer Literacy: Basic computer literacy training courses are held monthly at the public libraries. The Move that Mouse programme was specifically targeted to elderly patrons.

Services for the Visually Impaired: Visually impaired patrons continue to receive assistive technology training at Arima, Port of Spain, Carnegie, Maloney, and Chaguanas public libraries. This group includes members of PAVI (People Associated with Visual Impairment) and the Blind Welfare Association. Visually impaired patrons are taught how to access Jaws for Windows and instructed in the use of the Brailler, ClearView Magnifier, the Poet Compact Reader and Microsoft Office Suite.

Homebound Services to Senior Citizens: Outreach services were extended to senior citizens at 12 homes for the elderly across Trinidad and Tobago. The residents of these homes have stories read to them and are engaged in stimulating discussions. Items offered for loan include large print materials.

== The Educational Library Services Division ==
The Educational Library Services Division delivers and supports library services to Early Childhood Care and Education (ECCE) Centres, Primary and Secondary Schools, the National Open School of Trinidad and Tobago (NOSTT) and the Corporate Ministry of Education. The Division also partners with the National Training Agency OJT programme.

The School Library Services Unit forms part of the Ministry of Education, and is managed by the Educational Library Services Division of NALIS. It was first set up in 1978 to promote and coordinate the development of the libraries in sixth form schools. Over the years, the mandate was expanded to include a service to all secondary schools. The Unit currently supervises the school libraries in 497 primary schools and over 137 secondary schools.

Responsibilities of the unit include:

- The training and re-training of professional and para-professional staff in school libraries
- The selection, acquisition, and organisation of school library media by the technical services department
- Assisting with planning and development at both the national and local levels
- Drafting standards for personnel, resources, furniture and equipment for School Library Media Centres

== Special Libraries ==
Special libraries function to provide customized service to a particular clientele, in pursuit of defined organizational goals. The international Special Libraries Association defines special librarians as: “ information professionals dedicated to putting knowledge to work to attain the goals of their organizations. They are employed most frequently by corporations, private businesses, government agencies, museums, colleges, hospitals, associations, and information management consulting firms."

A new Special Library Services Department of NALIS is being established for the purpose of administering the professional operations of all special libraries under its purview, in the public sector, and by the authority of sections 4 d-e, 5-6 of Act 18, 1998.

The department has the responsibility of monitoring and evaluating the operations of all special libraries, to ensure that international benchmarks in information management standards are maintained. The core responsibilities of the Division are achieved mainly through conducting supervisory visits, meetings and training sessions and advising the public sector Heads of Departments on strategic activities affecting their library service.

== Mobile Library Services ==
The Mobile Library Service offers a lending service to rural areas where there are no established Public Libraries. This service has been in operation in Trinidad since the 1940s. Registration of students is done once a year around March/April. Adults can join during any routine Bookmobile run.

NALIS' first digital mobile library was officially commissioned on 6 December 2007. This new mobile library, like no other in the NALIS fleet, provides wireless access to the Internet, the online catalogue and electronic databases. Airconditioning, automatic lifts for wheelchairs and washroom facilities are other features.

== The Conservation Laboratory ==
The Government of Trinidad and Tobago continues to recognize the value of preserving the nation's heritage by investing in the establishment of a Preservation and Conservation Laboratory, housed in the basement of the National Library Building. In 2012, over 5,000 collection items were safely insect exterminated using specialized equipment, the Wei T’o Book Dryer and Insect Exterminator (BDIE). The Library Conservator and the supporting staff have lent technical assistance to clients in both in the private and public sectors, advising and assisting with the care and preservation of their library collections.

== Membership(s) ==
- The International Federation of Library Associations and Institutions (IFLA)

== See also ==
- List of national and state libraries
