= Caribbean Beat =

Caribbean magazine, founded 1992

Caribbean Beat, founded in 1992, is a bimonthly magazine, published in Port of Spain, Trinidad, covering the arts, culture and society of the Caribbean, with a focus on the region's English-speaking territories. It is distributed in-flight by Caribbean Airlines (CAL), formerly British West Indies Airways (BWIA), and is additionally available at select retail outlets in CAL destinations, and also by subscription, making it one of the region's most widely circulated magazines.

== Background ==
Caribbean Beat was launched in 1992 and is published by Media and Editorial Projects Limited. Its first issue ran a cover story on Martiniquan filmmaker Euzhan Palcy. The magazine has become known for its profiles and promotion of Caribbean artists, writers and other cultural figures, and for in-depth coverage of Caribbean music, festivals, sports, environment and other phenomena. Regarded as "the leading magazine on Caribbean and West Indian arts, culture and society", Caribbean Beat marked its 100th issue in November/December 2009, its 150th issue in March/April 2018, and its 30th anniversary issue in March/April 2022.

Past editors have included Nicholas Laughlin, Judy Raymond, Donna Benny, Skye Hernandez, and founding editor and publisher Jeremy Taylor, who remains a consulting editor. Its current chief editor is Caroline Taylor.
