= Nicholas Laughlin =

Trinidad and Tobago writer and editor (born 1975)

- Born: 6 May 1975 (age 51); Port of Spain, Trinidad
- Education: University of the West Indies, St Augustine
- Occupations: Writer and editor Festival and programme director of the NGC Bocas Lit Fest
- Writing career
- Notable works: Editor of The Caribbean Review of Books, and Caribbean Beat
- Website: nicholaslaughlin.net

Nicholas Laughlin (born 6 May 1975) is a writer and editor from Trinidad and Tobago. He has been editor of The Caribbean Review of Books since 2004, and also edits the arts and travel magazine Caribbean Beat. He is the festival and programme director of the NGC Bocas Lit Fest, having worked alongside founder and managing director Marina Salandy-Brown since 2011.

== Biography ==
Nicholas Laughlin was born and brought up in Port of Spain, Trinidad, where he is still based. He studied English at the University of the West Indies at St Augustine, and after graduating briefly worked as a sub-editor at the Trinidad Guardian. He was later employed by Caribbean Beat, becoming the magazine's editor in 2003. He also worked on reviving The Caribbean Review of Books (CRB), and the first issue of the reincarnated journal, of which he is editor, was published in May 2004. He also co-edits Town, "a modest literary magazine".

He edited a volume of early essays by C. L. R. James entitled Letters from London (2003, Prospect Press), and in 2009 a revised and expanded edition of V. S. Naipaul's family correspondence, entitled Letters between a Father and Son (published by Picador).

Laughlin served as programme director of Trinidad's annual NGC Bocas Lit Fest since its founding in 2011 by Marina Salandy-Brown. He is also a co-director, with Sean Leonard and Christopher Cozier, of the non-profit contemporary art space Alice Yard, in Port of Spain.

Laughlin has written book reviews, essays, profiles of writers and reportage for a range of outlets, including the Trinidad Guardian, the Trinidad and Tobago Review, Caribbean Beat, the Stabroek News, and the CRB. Also a poet, he is the author of the collection The Strange Years of My Life (Peepal Tree Press, 2015).

He co-edited (with Nailah Folami Imoja) the anthology So Many Islands: Stories from the Caribbean, Mediterranean, Indian and Pacific Oceans (Peekash Press, 2018).

As of January 2022, Laughlin has been the festival and programme director of the NGC Bocas Lit Fest, with founder Salandy-Brown remaining as the festival's president.

== Bibliography ==
- The Strange Years of My Life (Peepal Tree Press, 2015), ISBN 9781845232924
- As editor (with Nailah Folami Imoja), So Many Islands: Stories from the Caribbean, Mediterranean, Indian and Pacific Oceans (Peekash Press, 2018), ISBN 978-976-96106-0-6

=== Selected shorter writings ===
- "Fire next time", Trinidad and Tobago Review, November 2005
- "What 'Caribbean' can mean", Guyana Arts Journal, volume 2, number 2, March 2006.
- "Imaginary islands", The Caribbean Review of Books, May 2006.
- "Almost writing", The Caribbean Review of Books, November 2006.
- "The distraction of Walcott vs Naipaul", The Guardian, 5 June 2008.
- "V.S. Naipaul: the writer as 'last free man'", in Michael A. Bucknor and Alison Donnell (eds), The Routledge Companion to Anglophone Caribbean Literature, 2011.
- "There Are No Islands Without the Sea", in Tatiana Flores and Michelle A. Stephens (eds), Relational Undercurrents: Contemporary Art of the Caribbean Archipelago, 2017.
- "Remembering Derek Walcott (1930–2017) | Icon", Caribbean Beat, Issue 145 (May/June 2017).
