= Jeremy Taylor (writer) =

Trinidad and Tobago writer, editor and publisher

- Born: England
- Education: King's Ely
- Alma mater: University of Cambridge; Makerere University
- Occupations: Journalist, editor and publisher
- Known for: Co-founder of Media and Editorial Projects Limited (MEP)

Jeremy Taylor is a writer, editor and publisher who was born in England and has lived and worked in Trinidad and Tobago in the Caribbean since 1971. In 1991, he co-founded the publishing company Media and Editorial Projects Limited (MEP).

== Biography ==
Taylor has contributed the BBC and The Times (London), Radio Trinidad and Radio 95.1FM in Trinidad, the now defunct AVM Television,Trinidad & Tobago Television (TTT), the Trinidad and Tobago Express and Trinidad Guardian,

Additionally, Taylor contributed to a number of international print and radio organisations, including The Observer (London), The Sunday Times, The New York Times, Encyclopædia Britannica, World Book Encyclopaedia, the CBC (Toronto), National Public Radio (Washington), CANA (Caribbean News Agency), and The New Internationalist.

Taylor was the Founding Secretary of the Caribbean Publishers Network (CAPNET), from 2000 to 2002). He was among the founding members of the organising committee for the first Bocas LitFest, the Trinidad & Tobago literary festival, in April/May 2011.

== Bibliography ==
- Masquerade: A Visitor's Guide to Trinidad & Tobago (1986, Macmillan). Second edition: Trinidad and Tobago: An Introduction and Guide (1991, Macmillan, ISBN 978-0-333-55607-8)
- Trinidad and Tobago: A Souvenir in Pictures (1988, Macmillan)
- BWIA’s Caribbean: A Guide to 28 Caribbean Countries (1988, British West Indies Airways, ISBN 978-976-8033-04-8)
- Above and Beyond: A History of BWIA 1940–1990 (1990, British West Indies Airways)
- The Point Lisas Story (1991, Media & Editorial Projects)
- Going to Ground: Journalism 1972–1992 (1994, Prospect Press, ISBN 976-8052-08-2)
- A Black & White Book (2003, Prospect Press)
- Introduction, Trinidad & Tobago: Carnival Land Water People by Alex Smailes (2006, Macmillan, ISBN 978-1-4050-0749-8)
- Introduction, In the Public Eye by Joanne Kilgour Dowdy (2009, Commess University Press, ISBN 978-0-615-27720-2)
