= Funso Aiyejina =

Nigerian poet and academic (1949–2024)

- Born: 1 January 1949; Ososo, Colony and Protectorate of Nigeria
- Died: 1 July 2024 (aged 75); Trinidad
- Education: Obafemi Awolowo University, Ile-Ife, Nigeria; Acadia University, Wolfville, Nova Scotia, Canada; University of the West Indies
- Occupations: Poet, playwright, short-story writer, academic
- Years active: 1967–2024
- Awards: Association of Nigerian Authors' Poetry Prize, 1989; Best First Book (Africa), Commonwealth Writers' Prize, 2000; Bocas Henry Swanzy Award, 2022

Funso Aiyejina (1 January 1949 – 1 July 2024) was a Nigerian poet, short story writer, playwright and academic. He was Dean of Humanities and Education (until his retirement in 2014) and Professor Emeritus at the University of the West Indies. His collection of short fiction, The Legend of the Rockhills and Other Stories, won the 2000 Commonwealth Writers' Prize, Best First Book (Africa).

== Biography ==
Funso Aiyejina was born in 1949 in Ososo, Edo State, Nigeria. He was not Yoruba as most people think. He graduated from the University of Ife (now Obafemi Awolowo University) in Nigeria, Acadia University, Wolfville, Nova Scotia, in Canada, and the University of the West Indies (UWI), St Augustine, Trinidad.

He taught for more than a decade at Obafemi Awolowo University, and since 1990 at the University of the West Indies in Trinidad & Tobago. At UWI, Aiyejina initiated the MFA postgraduate degree in fiction writing. In 1995–96, he was Fulbright Lecturer in Creative Writing at Lincoln University in Jefferson City, Missouri. He was a founding board member of the NGC Bocas Lit Fest, later serving as its Deputy Festival Director.

In 2022, Aiyejina and Merle Hodge were joint winners of the Bocas Henry Swanzy Award for Distinguished Service to Caribbean Letters.

Aiyejina died in his sleep on 1 July 2024, at the age of 75. A memorial celebration honouring his life took place on 10 July, attended by family, colleagues and friends.

== Personal life ==
Aiyejina was married to Lynda Quamina-Aiyejina, with whom he had two sons.

== Writing and editorial work ==
Aiyejina's poetry and short stories have been published in many international journals and anthologies, including The Anchor Book of African Stories, Literature Without Borders, Kiss and Quarrel: Yoruba/English – Strategies for Mediation, The New African Poetry, and The Penguin Book of Modern African Poetry (1999), in which 1999 publication he was described as "one of Nigeria's finest satirists". His stories and plays have been read and dramatized on the radio in Nigeria and England.

He won the Association of Nigerian Authors' Poetry Prize in 1989 for his first book of poetry, A Letter to Lynda and Other Poems (1988). His first book of fiction, The Legend of the Rockhills and Other Stories (1999), won Best First Book (Africa), Commonwealth Writers' Prize, 2000. Reviewing his 2004 poetry collection, I, The Supreme and Other Poems, Jennifer Rahim stated: "All of Aiyejina's books to date demonstrate a concentrated interest with the historical, cultural and political life of Africa, particularly his native Nigeria. What is also evident is an emerging engagement with the continent's expanded diaspora. His writing, in other words, manifests a blossoming black diasporic poetics.... As outsider/insider to the Caribbean landscape and culture, he is awed by the miracle of African cultural survival and transformation."

He was a widely published critic on African and West Indian literature and culture. He is particularly notable for his work on the writing of Earl Lovelace, having been the editor of A Place in the World: Essays and Tributes in Honour of Earl Lovelace @ 70 (2008) and of Earl Lovelace: Growing in the Dark (Selected Essays) (2003), as well as author of the 2017 biography Earl Lovelace (University of the West Indies Press). He worked as an editor for UWI Press for many years.

Aiyejina was also the editor of Self-Portrait: Interviews with Ten West Indian Writers and Two Critics (2003) and co-editor (with Paula Morgan) of Caribbean Literature in a Global Context (2006). His play The Character Who Walked Out On His Author has been performed in Trinidad and Tobago, Jamaica and Nigeria.

== Works ==
=== Poetry ===
- A Letter to Lynda and Other Poems, Saros International Publishers, 1988 (Association of Nigerian Authors Prize, 1989); Lightning Source Inc, 2006, ISBN 978-1-85657-106-7
- I, The Supreme and Other Poems, Kraft Books Limited, 2004, ISBN 978-039-124-X
- Gerald Moore; Ulli Beier, eds. (2007). "Let Us Remember". The Penguin Book of Modern African Poetry. Penguin. ISBN 978-0-14-042472-0.
- The Errors of the Rendering, Peepal Tree Press Ltd, 2020 ISBN 9781845234621

=== Short stories ===
- The Legend of the Rockhills and other stories, TSAR, 1999, ISBN 978-0-920661-78-9

=== Plays ===
- The Character Who Walked Out On His Author, Kraft Books Limited, 2020, ISBN 978-918-604-4

=== As editor ===
- A Place in the World: Essays and Tributes in Honour of Earl Lovelace, Lexicon Trinidad Ltd, 2008, ISBN 978-976-631-050-9
- Earl Lovelace: Growing in the Dark (Selected Essays), Lexicon Trinidad Ltd, 2003, ISBN 976-631-028-9
- Self-Portrait: Interviews with Ten West Indian Writers and Two Critics, University of the West Indies, 2003, ISBN 978-976-620-182-1
- Thicker Than Water (New Writing from the Caribbean), Peekash Press, 2018, ISBN 978-976-96106-1-3
- "Sport Matters – Views from the UWI Faculty of Sport, 2019–2020", University of the West Indies Press, 2021, ISBN 978-976-640-857-2

=== As co-editor ===
- (With Judy Stone) Moving Right Along: Caribbean Stories in Honour of John Cropper, Lexicon Trinidad Ltd, 2010, ISBN 978-976-631-058-5
- (With Paula Morgan) Caribbean Literature in a Global Context, Lexicon Trinidad Ltd, 2006, ISBN 976-631-041-6

=== Biography ===
- Earl Lovelace (Caribbean Biography Series), University of the West Indies Press, 2017, ISBN 978-976-640-627-1

=== Monograph ===
"Esu Elegbara: A Source of an Alter/Native Theory of African Literature and Criticism", Centre for Black and African Arts and Civilization, 2010, ISBN 978-978-8406-43-3
