= List of Trinidad and Tobago writers =

This is a list of Trinidad and Tobago writers, including writers either from or associated with Trinidad and Tobago.

== A ==
- Claire Adam (born 1974)
- André Alexis (born 1957)
- Lisa Allen-Agostini (born 1970s)
- M. P. Alladin (1919–1980)
- Lauren K. Alleyne (born 1979)
- Michael Anthony (1930–2023)
- Robert Antoni (born 1958)
- William Archibald (1917–1970)
- Barbara Assoon (1929–2020)

== B ==
- Kevin Baldeosingh (born 1963)
- Ayanna Lloyd Banwo
- Courtenay Bartholomew (1931–2021)
- Valerie Belgrave (1946–2016)
- Gérard Besson (1942–2023)
- Lloyd Best (1946–2016)
- Neil Bissoondath (born 1955)
- Cheryl Boyce Taylor (born 1950)
- Dionne Brand (born 1953)
- Wayne Brown (born 1944)
- Cheryl Byron (1946–2016)

== C ==
- Christian Campbell (born 1979)
- Vahni Capildeo (born 1973)
- Trevor Carter (1930–2008)
- Faustin Charles (born 1944)
- Michèle Pearson Clarke (born 1973)
- Nicole Craig (born 1974)
- Selwyn Cudjoe (born 1943)

== D ==
- Ralph de Boissière (1946–2016)
- Clara Rosa De Lima (born 1922)

== E ==
- Ramabai Espinet (born 1948)

== G ==
- Albert Gomes (1911–1978)
- Beatrice Greig (1869–)
- Rosa Guy (1922–2012)

== H ==
- Errol Hill (1921–2003
- Merle Hodge (born 1944)
- Imran N. Hosein (born 1942)
- Kevin Jared Hosein (born 1986)

== J ==
- C. L. R. James (1901–1989)
- Cynthia James (born 1948)
- Barbara Jenkins
- Errol John (1901–1989)
- Amryl Johnson (1944–2001)
- Marion Patrick Jones (1931–2016)
- Anthony Joseph (born 1966)
- Edward Lanzer Joseph (1792 or 1793–1838)
- Lynn Joseph

== K ==
- Roi Kwabena (1956–2008)

== L ==
- Harold Sonny Ladoo (1945–1973)
- John La Rose (1927–2006)
- Nicholas Laughlin (born 1975)
- Earl Lovelace (born 1935)
- John Lyons (born 1933)

== M ==
- Ian McDonald (1933–2026)
- Dionyse McTair (born 1950)
- Rabindranath Maharaj (born 1955)
- Ralph Maraj (born 1949)
- Tony Martin (1942–2013)
- Ira Mathur
- Mustapha Matura (1939–2019)
- Marina Ama Omowale Maxwell
- Olga Maynard (1913–1994)
- Alfred Mendes (1897–1991)
- Sharon Millar
- Celeste Mohammed
- Patricia Mohammed (born 1954)
- Shani Mootoo (born 1957)

== N ==
- Savi Naipaul Akal (1928–2024)
- Seepersad Naipaul (1906–1953)
- Shiva Naipaul (1945–1985)
- V. S. Naipaul (1932–2018)
- Jamir Nazir
- Angelique Nixon
- Elizabeth Nunez (1944–2024)

== P ==
- George Padmore (1903–1959)
- Leslie "Teacher" Palmer (born 1943)
- Kenneth Vidia Parmasad (1946–2006)
- Raoul Pantin (1943–2015)
- Ingrid Persaud (born 1966)
- Lakshmi Persaud (1937–2024)
- Michel Maxwell Philip (1829–1888)
- M. NourbeSe Philip (born 1947)

== R ==
- Jennifer Rahim (born 1963)
- Kenneth Ramchand (born 1939)
- Raymond Ramcharitar
- Shivanee Ramlochan (born 1986)
- Kevin Ramnarine
- Kris Rampersad
- Lennox Raphael (born 1939)
- E. M. Roach (1922–2012)
- Ronald Suresh Roberts (born 1968)
- Colin Robinson (1961–2021
- Roger Robinson
- Monique Roffey (born 1965)
- Gordon Rohlehr (1943–2023)

== S ==
- Amon Saba Saakana (born 1948)
- Marina Salandy-Brown
- Lawrence Scott (born 1943)
- Sam Selvon (1923–1994)
- Raffique Shah (born 1946)
- Frances-Anne Solomon (born 1966)
- Eintou Pearl Springer (born 1944)

== T ==
- Jeremy Taylor
- John Jacob Thomas (1841–1889)

== W ==
- Derek Walcott (1930–2017)
- Elizabeth Walcott-Hackshaw (born 1964)
- A. R. F. Webber (1911–1981)
- Eric Williams (1911–1981)
- Henry Sylvester Williams (1869–1911)
- Marguerite Wyke (1908–1995)

== See also ==
- Trinidad and Tobago literature
