= Caribbean literature =

Literature of the Caribbean region

Caribbean literature is the literature of the various territories of the Caribbean region. Literature in English from the former British West Indies may be referred to as Anglo-Caribbean or, in historical contexts, as West Indian literature. Most of these territories have become independent nations since the 1960s, though some retain colonial ties to the United Kingdom. They share, apart from the English language, a number of political, cultural, and social ties which make it useful to consider their literary output in a single category. Note that other non-independent islands may include the Caribbean unincorporated territories of the United States, however literature from this region has not yet been studied as a separate category and is independent from West Indian literature. The more wide-ranging term "Caribbean literature" generally refers to the literature of all Caribbean territories regardless of language—whether written in English, Spanish, French, Hindustani, or Dutch, or one of numerous creoles.

The literature of Caribbean is exceptional, both in language and subject. Through themes of innocence, exile and return to motherland, resistance and endurance, engagement and alienation, self determination, Caribbean literature provides a powerful platform for Post-Colonial studies and to Caribbean literatures in importance the context of all literature.

== "Caribbean literature" vs. "West Indian literature" ==
As scholarship expands, there is debate about the correct term to use for literature that comes from the region. Both terms are often used interchangeably despite having different origins and referring to slightly different groups of people. Since so much of Caribbean identity is linked to "insidious racism" and "the justification of slave labor", it is usual to refer to the author of the piece for their identity preference.

West Indian is defined as coming from the "West Indies", which includes "the islands of the Caribbean" and was "used first [for] indigenous population, and subsequently both [for] settlers of European origin and of people of African origin brought to the area as slaves." West Indian can also refer to things that can be "traced back" to the West Indies but the creators "live elsewhere". West Indian "was a term coined by colonising European powers." Caribbean, on the other hand, is defined as "of the Caribbean...its people, and their cultures" only.

Further issues include language classifications like Creole Caribbean literature and Anglophone Caribbean literature. Different languages also make different references to the texts. While there is no terminology that is obsolete, the issue requires acknowledgement, since it is the literature of historically oppressed people. The Spanish Caribbean islands include Cuba, Puerto Rico, the Dominican Republic, and Panama as well as the islands of Venezuela and the Caribbean coast of Colombia.

== Territories included in the category West Indian ==
The literature of Anguilla, Antigua and Barbuda, Aruba, Curaçao, the Bahamas, Barbados, Belize, the British Virgin Islands, the Cayman Islands, Dominica, Grenada, Guyana, Haiti, Jamaica, Montserrat, Saint Martin, St Kitts and Nevis, St Lucia, St Vincent and the Grenadines, Suriname, Trinidad and Tobago, Turks and Caicos and the U.S. Virgin Islands would normally be considered to belong to the wider category of West Indian literature.

== Development of the concept of West Indian literature ==
The term "West Indies" first began to achieve wide currency in the 1950s, when writers such as Samuel Selvon, John Hearne, Edgar Mittelholzer, V. S. Naipaul, Andrew Salkey, and George Lamming began to be published in the United Kingdom. A sense of a single literature developing across the islands was also encouraged in the 1940s by the BBC radio programme Caribbean Voices, which featured stories and poems written by West Indian authors, recorded in London under the direction of founding producer Una Marson and later Henry Swanzy, and broadcast back to the islands. Magazines such as Kyk-Over-Al in Guyana, Bim in Barbados, and Focus in Jamaica, which published work by writers from across the region, also encouraged links and helped build an audience.

Many—perhaps most—West Indian writers have found it necessary to leave their home territories and base themselves in the United Kingdom, the United States, or Canada in order to make a living from their work—in some cases spending the greater parts of their careers away from the territories of their birth. Critics in their adopted territories might argue that, for instance, V. S. Naipaul ought to be considered a British writer instead of a Trinidadian writer, or Jamaica Kincaid and Paule Marshall American writers, but most West Indian readers and critics still consider these writers "West Indian".

West Indian literature ranges over subjects and themes as wide as those of any other "national" literature, but in general many West Indian writers share a special concern with questions of identity, ethnicity, and language that rise out of the Caribbean historical experience.

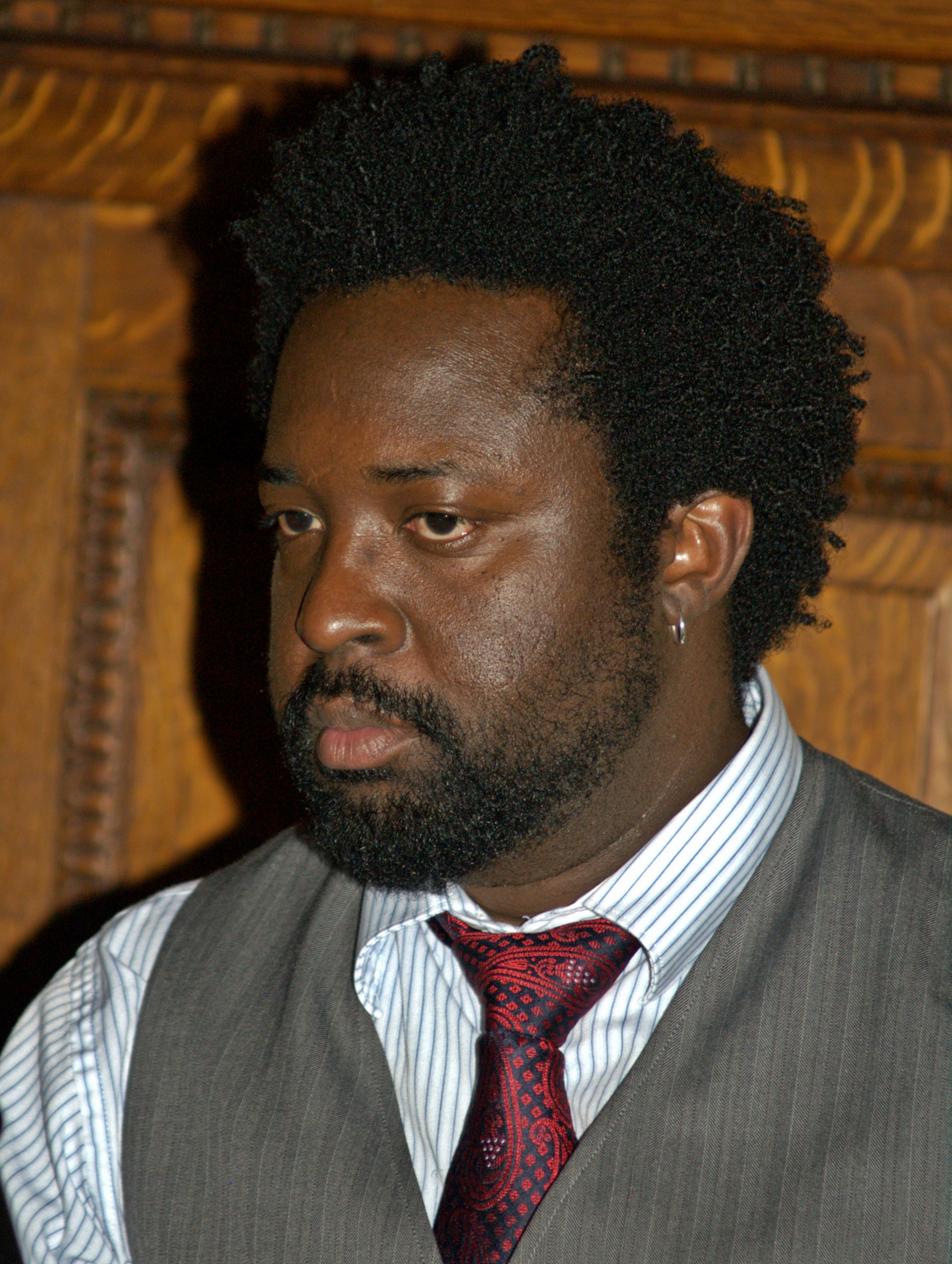
Marlon James at the 2010 Brooklyn Book Festival

One unique and pervasive characteristic of Caribbean literature is the use of "dialect" forms of the national language, often termed creole. The various local variations in the language adopted from the colonial powers such as Britain, Spain, Portugal, France and the Netherlands, have been modified over the years within each country and each has developed a blend that is unique to their country. Many Caribbean authors in their writing switch liberally between the local variation—now commonly termed nation language—and the standard form of the language. Two West Indian writers have won the Nobel Prize for literature: Derek Walcott (1992), born in St. Lucia, resident mostly in Trinidad during the 1960s and '70s, and partly in the United States since then; and V. S. Naipaul (2001), born in Trinidad and resident in the United Kingdom since 1950. (Saint-John Perse, who won the Nobel Prize in 1960, was born in the French territory of Guadeloupe.)

Other notable names in (anglophone) Caribbean literature have included Una Marson, Earl Lovelace, Austin Clarke, Claude McKay, Louise Bennett, Orlando Patterson, Andrew Salkey, Edward Kamau Brathwaite (who was born in Barbados and has lived in Ghana and Jamaica), Linton Kwesi Johnson, Velma Pollard and Michelle Cliff, to name only a few. In more recent times, a number of literary voices have emerged from the Caribbean as well as the Caribbean diaspora, including Kittitian Caryl Phillips (who has lived in the UK since one month of age); Edwidge Danticat, a Haitian immigrant to the United States; Anthony Kellman from Barbados, who divides his time between Barbados and the United States; Andrea Levy of the United Kingdom; Jamaicans Alecia McKenzie, who has lived in Belgium, Singapore and France, and Colin Channer and Marlon James, the author of the 2015 Man Booker Prize-winning novel A Brief History of Seven Killings (as well as John Crow's Devil, The Book of Night Women, the unpublished screenplay "Dead Men", and the short story "Under Cover of Darkness"), Antiguan Marie-Elena John, and Lasana M. Sekou from Saint Martin.

== Themes of migration, landscape, nature ==
Caribbean lands and seas have been depicted as a paradise on earth by foreign artists and writers. Scholars and writers in Postcolonial Studies have researched and published on this cultural phenomenon of an empty island, and the racist implications of a fantasy void of local people and their cultures. Caribbean classic novels such as Jean Rhys's Wide Sargasso Sea (1966) have inspired films, stories, and poems by other artists who seek to decolonize the relationship of people and landscapes.

Caribbean novelists imbue island landscape with bustling life of the locals and migrants. The migration of Caribbean workers to the Panama Canal is often used as a narrative foundation. Maryse Condé’s novel Tree of Life (1992) discusses the involvement of family ties and how people seek to improve their lot in life by working to build the Panama Canal. Another contemporary classic about migrant cultures is Ramabai Espinet’s novel The Swinging Bridge (2003), which explores trauma of displacement, Indian indentureship, and the phenomena of invisibility relating to women.

Caribbean stories and poems are ripe with references to storms, hurricanes, and natural disasters. Derek Walcott wrote "The Sea is History," and dramatized the impact of tropical storms and hurricanes on the locals.

Caribbean writing deploys agricultural symbolism to represent the complexities of colonial rule and the intrinsic values of the lands. Native fruits and vegetables appear in colonized and decolonizing discourse. Derek Walcott describes the complications of colonialism using local fruit metaphors, such as star apples, in his poetry to connote the complexity of acidity and the sweetness. Giannina Braschi's postcolonial work United States of Banana imagines a political and economic deal between China and Puerto Rico as the exchange of a bowl of rice for a bowl of beans, and a Lychee for a Quenepa.

== Poetry ==
Caribbean poetry is vast and rapidly evolving field of poetry written by people from the Caribbean region and the diaspora.

Caribbean poetry generally refers to a myriad of poetic forms, spanning epic, lyrical verse, prose poems, dramatic poetry and oral poetry, composed in Caribbean territories regardless of language. It is most often, however, written in English, Spanish, Spanglish, French, Hindustani, Dutch, or any number of creoles. Poetry in English from the former British West Indies has been referred to as Anglo-Caribbean poetry or West Indian poetry.

Since the mid-1970s, Caribbean poetry has gained increasing visibility with the publication in Britain and North America of several anthologies. Over the decades the canon has shifted and expanded, drawing both on oral and literary traditions and including more women poets and politically charged works. Caribbean writers, performance poets, newspaper poets, singer-songwriters have created a popular art form, a poetry heard by audiences all over the world. Caribbean oral poetry shares the vigour of the written tradition.

Among the most prominent Caribbean poets whose works are widely studied (and translated into other languages) are: Derek Walcott (who won the 1992 Nobel Prize for Literature), Kamau Brathwaite, Edouard Glissant, Giannina Braschi, Lorna Goodinson, Aimé Fernand Césaire, Linton Kwesi Johnson, Kwame Dawes, and Claudia Rankine.

Common themes include: exile and return to the motherland; the relationship of language to nation; colonialism and postcolonialism; self-determination and liberty; racial identity.

== Women writers ==
There is great abundance of talent, styles, and subjects covered by Caribbean women writers spanning the genres of poetry, theater, short stories, essays, and novels. There is also a burgeoning field of scholarship on how women authors address women's lives under dictatorships, eroticism and the body, history and identity, migration, Afro Caribbean history, decolonization, revolution, queer theory, among countless other topics.

Major novelists include Maryse Condé (Guadeloupe), Merle Hodge (Trinidad), Paule Marshall (Barbadian-American), Cynthia McLeod (Suriname), Astrid Roemer (Suriname) Elizabeth Nunez (Trinidad-American ), Tiphanie Yanique (Virgin Islands), Rosario Ferre, (Puerto Rico), and Michelle Cliff (Jamaica).

Poets include Mahadai Das (Guyana), Lenelle Moïse (Haiti), Nancy Morejón, Pamela Mordecai (Jamaica), Lorna Goodison (Jamaica), Julia de Burgos, Mara Pastor, Giannina Braschi (Puerto Rico), Merle Collins (Grenada), Shara McCallum (Jamaica), Chiqui Vicioso (Dominican Republic), Jennifer Rahim (Trinidad and Tobago), Olive Senior (Jamaica) and Yvonne Weekes [Montserrat/Barbados].

Playwrights include Una Marson who wrote in English, and Ina Césaire (Martinique) and Simone Schwarz-Bart (France/Guadeloupe) who write in French.

== Epics ==
There are many epic stories, plays, and poems written in and about the Caribbean. Dating to the 16th century, Juan de Castellanos's Elegy to the Illustrious Gentlemen of the Indies (1589) is an epic in verse that traces Columbus's arrival to the conquest of Cuba, Jamaica, Trinidad, and Margarita. The work relates Juan Ponce de León's colonization of Puerto Rico in search for the mythic fountain of youth. Later epics of the Spanish West Indies include Manuel de Jesus Galvan's national epic "The Sword and the Cross" (1954) that relates the myths and histories of the colony of Hispaniola.

In the 20th century, epics approach subjects such racist legacies, economic terrorism, and the decolonization of Caribbean culture and politics. Nobel Prize winner Derek Walcott wrote Omeros (1990). This epic poem is divided into seven books containing sixty-four chapters. Most of the poem is composed in a three-line form that is reminiscent of the terza rima form that Dante used for The Divine Comedy. The work uses local island folklore and ancient Greek myths such as Homer' Iliad to address legacies of Greek, Roman, and American culture including racism and slavery. Parts of the story occur on Walcott's native island St. Lucia, but there are also time travels to ancient Greece and Rome, as well as travels to modern day Lisbon, London, Dublin, Toronto.

Giannina Braschi's Empire of Dreams (1988) is a postmodern epic composed of six books of poetry that blend elements of eclogues, epigrams, lyrics, prose poem, diary, jingles, Puerto Rican folklore, and political manifesto. The work traces the history of the Spanish language from medieval times to contemporary Puerto Rico, Cuban, Chicano, and Nuyorican culture. Braschi's later epic, written in English, is United States of Banana (2011), a geopolitical tragic-comedy about the fall of the American empire, the liberation of Puerto Rico, and the realignment of powers among Caribbean nations. Mixing elements of poetry, lyric essay, Caribbean songs, and socratic dialogues, this epic tackles the subjects of global debt, financial terrorism, and decolonization.

Trinidadian playwright and novelist Earl Lovelace's work has been described as performative epics that mix the rhythms of steelband and calypso with complex narratives about black power and the political, spiritual, and psychic struggles for decolonization. His best known works are The Dragon Can't Dance (1979) and Salt (1996) which won the Commonwealth Book Prize.

== Literary festivals ==
Many parts of the Caribbean have begun in recent years to host literary festivals, including in Anguilla, the Anguilla Lit Fest, in Cuba the Havana International Book Fair, in Trinidad and Tobago the NGC Bocas Lit Fest, in Jamaica the Calabash International Literary Festival, in Saint Martin/Sint Maarten the St. Martin Book Fair, in Barbados Bim Literary Festival, in the Dominican Republic the Santo Domingo International Book Fair, in Dominica the Nature Island Literary Festival and Book Fair, Alliouagana Festival of the Word in Montserrat, the Virgin Islands Literary Festival and Book Fair, the International Poetry Festival - Puerto Rico, and Antigua and Barbuda Literary Festival. The Caribbean Literature Day is celebrated annually on July 12, in the Caribbean region, across all language zones, and by Caribbean literature lovers worldwide.

== Prizes ==
- The Frank Collymore Literary Endowment Prize
- Casa de las Américas Prize
- OCM Bocas Prize for Caribbean Literature
- Grand Prize for Caribbean Literature, Association of Caribbean Writers (Guadeloupe)
- Brooklyn Caribbean Literary Festival Elizabeth Nunez Award

== Notable West Indian writers ==
(Grouped by territory of birth or upbringing)

=== Antigua ===
- Marie-Elena John
- Jamaica Kincaid
- Joanne C. Hillhouse

=== The Bahamas ===
- Robert Antoni
- Marion Bethel
- Patricia Glinton-Meicholas

=== Barbados ===
- Kamau Brathwaite
- Austin Clarke
- Frank Collymore
- Geoffrey Drayton
- Anthony Kellman
- George Lamming
- Karen Lord
- Paule Marshall
- Esther Phillips
- Andrea Stuart
- Cynthia Wilson

=== Belize ===
- Zee Edgell
- Evan X Hyde
- Adele Ramos
- Colville Young

=== Bonaire ===
- Cola Debrot

=== Cuba ===
- Antonio Benitez-Rojo
- Guillermo Cabrera Infante
- Alejo Carpentier
- Roberto Fernández Retamar
- Nicolás Guillén
- Jorge Enrique González Pacheco
- José Lezama Lima
- Dulce María Loynaz
- José Martí
- Carlos Moore (writer)
- Nancy Morejon
- Leonardo Padura Fuentes
- Virgilio Piñera
- Emilio Jorge Rodríguez
- Guillermo Rosales
- Severo Sarduy

=== Curaçao ===
- Frank Martinus Arion
- Sonia Cuales
- May Henriquez
- Pierre Lauffer
- Hemayel Martina
- Tip Marugg
- Nilda Pinto

=== Dominica ===
- Phyllis Shand Allfrey
- Lennox Honychurch
- Elma Napier
- Jean Rhys

=== Dominican Republic ===
- Julia Alvarez
- Julio Vega Battle
- Raquel Cepeda
- Junot Díaz
- Blas Jiménez
- Mateo Morrison
- Chiqui Vicioso

=== Grenada ===
- Jacob Ross
- Tobias S. Buckell
- Merle Collins
- Gus John

=== Guadeloupe ===
- Maryse Condé
- Saint-John Perse
- Gisèle Pineau
- Max Rippon
- Simone Schwarz-Bart

=== Guyana ===
- John Agard
- Gaiutra Bahadur
- E. R. Braithwaite
- Jan Carew
- Martin Carter
- Cyril Dabydeen
- David Dabydeen
- Fred D'Aguiar
- O. R. Dathorne
- Beryl Gilroy
- Wilson Harris
- Roy A. K. Heath
- Ruel Johnson
- Oonya Kempadoo
- Peter Kempadoo
- Sharon Maas
- Yolanda T. Marshall
- Mark McWatt
- Pauline Melville
- Edgar Mittelholzer
- Grace Nichols
- Walter Rodney
- Gordon Rohlehr
- A. J. Seymour
- Jan Shinebourne
- Eric Walrond
- Denis Williams

=== Haiti ===
- Edwidge Danticat
- René Depestre
- Marie Vieux-Chauvet
- Myriam J. A. Chancy
- Dany Laferrière
- Dimitry Elias Léger
- Jacques Roumain
- Emeric Bergeaud
- Frankétienne
- Beaubrun Ardouin
- Emile Nau
- Ignace Nau
- Lyonel Trouillot
- René Philoctète
- Marie-Célie Agnant

=== Jamaica ===
- Louise Bennett-Coverley
- James Berry
- Erna Brodber
- Margaret Cezair-Thompson
- Colin Channer
- Michelle Cliff
- Kwame Dawes
- Jean D'Costa
- Herbert de Lisser
- Ferdinand Dennis
- Marcia Douglas
- Gloria Escoffery
- John Figueroa
- Honor Ford-Smith
- Lorna Goodison
- Richard Hart
- John Hearne
- A. L. Hendriks
- Nalo Hopkinson
- Marlon James
- Linton Kwesi Johnson
- Roger Mais
- Una Marson
- Claude McKay
- Alecia McKenzie
- Anthony McNeill
- Mervyn Morris
- Mutabaruka
- Rex Nettleford
- Orlando Patterson
- Geoffrey Philp
- Velma Pollard
- Patricia Powell
- Claudia Rankine
- Barry Reckord
- V. S. Reid
- Joan Riley
- Trevor Rhone
- Leone Ross
- Andrew Salkey
- Dennis Scott
- Olive Senior
- M. G. Smith
- Mikey Smith
- Anthony C. Winkler
- Sylvia Wynter

=== Martinique ===
- Jean Bernabé
- Mayotte Capécia
- Marie-Magdeleine Carbet
- Aimé Césaire
- Ina Césaire
- Patrick Chamoiseau
- Raphaël Confiant
- Marie-Reine de Jaham
- Suzanne Dracius
- Françoise Ega
- Frantz Fanon
- Edouard Glissant
- Simone Yoyotte
- Joseph Zobel

=== Montserrat ===
- Howard Fergus
- E. A. Markham
- Yvonne Weekes
- Edgar Nkosi White

=== Puerto Rico ===
- Giannina Braschi
- Lola Rodríguez de Tió
- Rosario Ferré
- Juan Carlos Quintero Herencia
- Eugenio María de Hostos
- Luis Palés Matos
- Julia de Burgos
- Aurora Levins Morales
- Manuel Ramos Otero
- Luis Rafael Sánchez
- Esmeralda Santiago
- Mayra Santos-Febres
- Ana Lydia Vega
- José Luis Vega
- Francisco Arrivi
- René Marqués

=== St Kitts and Nevis ===
- Cyril Briggs
- Caryl Phillips

=== St Lucia ===
- Kendel Hippolyte
- Jane King
- Vladimir Lucien
- Derek Walcott

=== Saint Martin ===
- Lasana M. Sekou

=== St Vincent and The Grenadines ===
- Cecil Browne
- Shake Keane
- Philip Nanton

=== Suriname ===
- Clark Accord
- Albert Helman
- Cynthia McLeod
- Ismene Krishnadath

=== The British Virgin Islands ===
- Richard Georges
- Alphaeus Osario Norman
- Patricia G. Turnbull

=== Trinidad and Tobago ===
- James Christopher Aboud
- Lisa Allen-Agostini
- Lauren K. Alleyne
- Michael Anthony
- Robert Antoni
- Kevin Baldeosingh
- Dionne Brand
- Brother Resistance
- Lennox Brown
- Wayne Brown
- Vahni Capildeo
- Meta Davis Cumberbatch
- Ralph de Boissière
- Ramabai Espinet
- Albert Gomes
- Cecil Gray
- Rosa Guy
- Errol Hill
- Merle Hodge
- C. L. R. James
- Cynthia James
- Anthony Joseph
- Roi Kwabena
- Harold "Sonny" Ladoo
- John La Rose
- Earl Lovelace
- John Lyons
- Rabindranath Maharaj
- Mustapha Matura
- Ian McDonald
- Dionyse McTair
- Alfred Mendes
- Shani Mootoo
- Shiva Naipaul
- V. S. Naipaul
- Elizabeth Nunez
- Lakshmi Persaud
- M. NourbeSe Philip
- Jennifer Rahim
- Kenneth Ramchand
- Roger Robinson
- Monique Roffey
- Amon Saba Saakana
- Lawrence Scott
- Samuel Selvon
- Frances-Anne Solomon
- Eintou Pearl Springer
- Kenneth Vidia Parmasad
- Elizabeth Walcott-Hackshaw
- Eric Williams

=== Virgin Islands ===
- Kacen Callender
- Cadwell Turnbull
- Tiphanie Yanique

== West Indian literary periodicals ==
- The Beacon (Trinidad)
- Bim (Barbados)
- DIALOGUE (Trinidad)
- The Caribbean Writer (U. S. Virgin Islands)
- Focus (Jamaica)
- Kyk-Over-Al (Guyana)
- The Caribbean Review of Books (Trinidad)
- Savacou (journal of the Caribbean Artists Movement (London, UK)
- Moko - Caribbean Arts and Letters (Virgin Islands)
- Interviewing the Caribbean - letters and the visual arts (Jamaica)

== See also ==
- American poetry
- Caribbean poetry
- Creole languages
- Cuban literature
- Dub poetry
- Haitian literature
- Postcolonial Literature
- Postcolonial Studies
