= List of Trinidad and Tobago women writers =

This is a list of Trinidad and Tobago women writers, including women writers either from or associated with Trinidad and Tobago.

== A ==
- Claire Adam (living)
- Lisa Allen-Agostini (b. 1960s)
- M. Jacqui Alexander (living)
- Lauren K. Alleyne (b. 1979)
- Barbara Assoon (1929–2020)
- Rhea-Simone Auguste (b. 1984)

== B ==
- Ayanna Lloyd Banwo (living)
- Tracey Baptiste (b. 1972)
- Valerie Belgrave (1946–2016)
- Carole Boyce Davies (living)
- Dionne Brand (b. 1953)
- Cheryl Byron (c. 1947–2003)

== C ==
- Vahni Capildeo (b. 1973)
- Michèle Pearson Clarke (b. 1973)
- Nicole Craig (b. 1974)

== D ==
- Meta Davis Cumberbatch (1900–1978)

== E ==
- Summer Edward (b. 1986)
- Ramabai Espinet (b. 1948)

== G ==
- Ann Marie Ganness (living)
- R. S. A. Garcia (living)
- Molly Gaskin (b. 1941)
- Beatrice Greig (b. 1869)
- Rosa Guy (1922–2012)

== H ==
- Merle Hodge (b. 1944)
- Magnolia Howell (b. 1993)

== I ==
- Stacy-Marie Ishmael (living)

== J ==
- Cynthia James (b. 1948)
- Barbara Jenkins (living)
- Amryl Johnson (1944–2001)
- Claudia Jones (1915–1964)
- Marion Patrick Jones (1931–2016)
- Lynn Joseph (living)
- Rahanna Alicia Juman (living)

== K ==
- Sylvia Kacal (1939–2003)

== L ==
- Utrice Leid (b. c. 1953)

== M ==
- Dionyse McTair (b. 1950)
- Emilie Maresse-Paul (1838–1900)
- Ira Mathur living)
- Marina Ama Omowale Maxwell (living)
- Olga Maynard (1913–1994)
- Kim Katrin Milan (b. 1984)
- Sharon Millar (living)
- Therese Mills (1928–2014)
- Patricia Mohammed (b. 1954)
- Shani Mootoo (b. 1957)

== N ==
- Angelique Nixon (living)
- Elizabeth Nunez (1944–2024)

== P ==
- Ingrid Persaud (living)
- Lakshmi Persaud (living)
- M. NourbeSe Philip (b. 1947)

== R ==
- Jennifer Rahim (living)
- Shivanee Ramlochan (b. 1986)
- Kris Rampersad (living)
- Monique Roffey (b. 1965)

== S ==
- Marina Salandy-Brown (living)
- Frances-Anne Solomon (b. 1966)
- Eintou Pearl Springer (b. 1944)

== T ==
- Samantha Thornhill (living)

== W ==
- Elizabeth Walcott-Hackshaw (b. 1964)
- Maureen Warner-Lewis (b. 1943)

== See also ==
- Trinidad and Tobago literature
