= Trinidad and Tobago literature =

Trinidad and Tobago literature has its roots in oral storytelling among African slaves, the European literary roots of the French creoles and in the religious and folk tales of the Indian indentured immigrants. It blossomed in the 20th century with the writings of C. L. R. James, V. S. Naipaul and Saint Lucian-born Derek Walcott as part of the growth of West Indian literature.

== Origins ==
One of the earliest works in the Anglophone Caribbean literature was Jean-Baptiste Philippe's 1824 work, Free Mulatto. Trinidadian Michel Maxwell Philip's 1854 work, Emmanuel Appadocca: A Tale of the Boucaneers, is sometimes referred to as the Anglophone Caribbean's first novel.

== Notable writers ==
- James Christopher Aboud
- Lisa Allen-Agostini
- Michael Anthony
- Robert Antoni
- William Archibald
- Kevin Baldeosingh
- Floella Benjamin
- Neil Bissoondath
- Roger Bonair-Agard
- Wayne Brown
- Vahni Capildeo
- Nicole Craig
- Ralph de Boissière
- Ramabai Espinet
- Albert Gomes
- Cecil Gray
- Rosa Guy
- Errol Hill
- Merle Hodge
- Darcus Howe
- C. L. R. James
- Errol John
- Amryl Johnson
- Anthony Joseph
- Ismith Khan
- Roi Kwabena
- Harold "Sonny" Ladoo
- Sarah Lakhansingh
- John La Rose
- Earl Lovelace
- Anna Levi
- John Lyons
- Rabindranath Maharaj
- Ian McDonald
- Ralph Maraj
- Tony Martin
- Mustapha Matura
- Alfred Mendes
- Shani Mootoo
- Balkrishna Naipaul
- Shiva Naipaul
- V. S. Naipaul
- George Padmore
- Lakshmi Persaud
- M. NourbeSe Philip
- Jennifer Rahim
- Kenneth Ramchand
- Raymond Ramcharitar
- Lennox Raphael
- Eric Roach
- Monique Roffey
- Lawrence Scott
- Samuel Selvon
- Eintou Pearl Springer
- John Jacob Thomas
- Derek Walcott
- Eric Williams

== See also ==
- West Indian literature
