= José Vega =

José Vega may refer to:

- Joseph de la Vega (1650–1692), Spanish-Dutch merchant
- José Luis Vega (born 1948), Puerto Rican poet
- José Vega Díaz (1902–1994), Chilean politician
- José Vega (Peruvian politician) (born 1957), Peruvian politician
- José Vega Santana (born 1958), Puerto Rican clown, also known as "Remi"
- José Vega (Ecuadorian footballer) (born 1958), Ecuadorian footballer
- José Sergio Vega Cuamea (1969–2010), Mexican banda singer known as Sergio Vega (singer)
- José Vega (Spanish footballer) (born 1981), Spanish footballer
- Jose Vega (fighter) (born 1985), American mixed martial artist
- José Vega (cyclist) (born 1987), professional road racing cyclist from Costa Rica
- 23329 Josevega, minor planet
- José G. Tormos Vega (born 1925), Puerto Rican politician
- José Luis Feliciano Vega (1935–2014), Puerto Rican composer and singer known as Cheo Feliciano
- José Antonio Rodríguez Vega (1957–2002), Spanish serial killer
- José Chico Vega, Puerto Rican New Progressive Party politician
