= Ega =

Ega or EGA may refer to:

== Military ==
- East German Army, the common western name for the National People's Army
- Eagle, Globe, and Anchor, the emblem of the United States Marine Corps

== People ==
- Aega (mayor of the palace), 7th-century noble of Neustria and Burgundy
- Françoise Ega (1920–1976), Afro-Martinican laborer, writer and social activist

== Places ==
- Egå, a suburban area of Aarhus, Denmark
- Ega, Portugal, a parish of Condeixa-a-Nova
- Ega (river), in Spain
- Tefé, formerly Ega, a city and a municipality in Brazil

== Science ==
- Éléments de géométrie algébrique, a mathematical treatise by Alexander Grothendieck and Jean Dieudonné
- European Genome-phenome Archive
- Evolved gas analysis

== Technology ==
- Enhanced Graphics Adapter, an IBM PC computer display standard from 1984

== Other uses ==
- Ecuato Guineana, a defunct Equatoguinean airline
- Ega language
- Egyptian German Automotive Company, an Egyptian automobile manufacturer
- Elegant Gothic Aristocrat, a fashion line
- Embroiderers' Guild of America,
- Emirates Global Aluminium (EGA), an aluminium conglomerate
- European Golf Association
- Ega (beetle), a genus of ground beetles in the family Carabidae

== See also ==
- Ega long-tongued bat (Scleronycteris ega)
- Eega, a 2012 Indian film by S. S. Rajamouli
- Eega (soundtrack), soundtrack of the film
