= Césaire (disambiguation) =

Césaire was a French writer, poet and politician from Martinique.

"Césaire" may also refer to:

- Ina Césaire, the French playwright and ethnographer
- Suzanne Césaire, a French writer
- Jacques Cesaire, an American football player and coach
