= Anthony McNeill =

Jamaican poet

Roy Anthony "Tony" McNeill (1941 – 2 January 1996) was a Jamaican poet, considered one of the most promising West Indian writers of his generation, whose career was cut short by his early death.

== Biography ==
McNeill was born in Kingston, Jamaica and educated at Excelsior School and St. George's College (where he was already known to his friends as a poet) before leaving to study in the United States. He studied creative writing at Johns Hopkins University and the University of Massachusetts Amherst, from which he graduated with a PhD. He returned to Jamaica in 1975, where he worked as a journalist and assistant editor of the Jamaica Journal (1975–81), as well as in a variety of other jobs, including civil servant, encyclopedia salesman, and janitor.

While a student in the US, McNeill began writing seriously. His first major collection of poems, Reel from "The Life Movie", appeared in 1972 and immediately established his reputation in Jamaica alongside his contemporaries Dennis Scott and Mervyn Morris. This was followed by Credences at the Altar of Cloud (1979) and Chinese Lanterns from the Blue Child, published posthumously in 1998. Other significant work remains unpublished.

McNeill was known for his experimental style, influenced by contemporary jazz as well as American poets like Walt Whitman, Emily Dickinson, and E. E. Cummings. He once said, of his first collection, "I don't think I could write if my first concern wasn't for the aesthetic." He also claimed that his greatest ambition was to be a jazz pianist.

He was recognised by his peers as a prodigious talent, but McNeill was plagued by alcoholism and drug abuse. In one of his later poems he wrote, "I realised very early I had no gift for conducting a life. So I shifted my focus and sang a wreath." He died while undergoing surgery at the University Hospital of the West Indies on 2 January 1996. In an obituary essay, poet and literary scholar Mervyn Morris wrote: "We have lost one of the finest of our West Indian poets, an extreme talent, recklessly experimental, awesome in commitment to his gift."
