= Juan Quintero =

Juan Quintero may refer to:

== Sportspeople ==
- Juan Carlos Quintero (born 1978), Colombian football midfielder
- Juan Fernando Quintero (born 1993), Colombian football attacking midfielder
- Juan Sebastián Quintero (born 1995), Colombian football centre-back

== Other people ==
- Juan Quintero Muñoz (1903–1980), Spanish composer
- Juan Carlos Quintero Herencia (born 1963), Puerto Rican author
