= Vincent Brown (lawyer) =

Trinidadian lawyer and Attorney-General of Trinidad and Tobago

Vincent Brown, K.C. (1855 – 9 November 1904) was a Trinidadian lawyer and Attorney-General of Trinidad and Tobago.

He was born one of three brothers to Joseph Brown, a merchant of St Vincent and moved as a child with his family to Trinidad, where he was educated at St Mary's College, Port of Spain. He afterwards studied law at Gray's Inn in London.

On his return to Trinidad he became a magistrate and was appointed Solicitor-General in 1892, a post he held until he was made Attorney-General in 1903. He also served as Mayor of Port of Spain in 1889–90 and was appointed King's Counsel.

His son, Kenneth Vincent Brown was a Senior Puisne Judge. His grandson was Wayne Vincent Brown, a notable author, journalist and poet.
