= Max Rippon =

Australian rules footballer

Personal information
- Full name: Maxwell George Rippon
- Born: 11 October 1920; Cheltenham, Victoria
- Died: 12 July 1985 (aged 64); Parkdale, Victoria
- Original team: Heatherton
- Height: 165 cm (5 ft 5 in)
- Weight: 61 kg (134 lb)

Playing career^{1}
Years	Club	Games (Goals)
1943	Fitzroy	2 (0)
1944	South Melbourne	4 (0)
1945–1947	St Kilda	41 (4)
1948	Brighton (VFA)	
Total		47 (4)
- ^{1} Playing statistics correct to the end of 1947.

Maxwell George Rippon (11 October 1920 – 12 July 1985) was an Australian rules footballer who played with Fitzroy, South Melbourne and St Kilda in the Victorian Football League (VFL).

Rippon was a wingman, who arrived at Fitzroy from Heatherton. He didn't have much impact in his one-season stints with Fitzroy and South Melbourne, but was a regular fixture in the St Kilda team for three seasons. While at St Kilda in 1945 he had a teammate, Ted Rippon, who was his uncle. In 1946, he represented Victoria in an interstate fixture against South Australia. Once he left the VFL he continued his football career in the Victorian Football Association with Brighton.
