= Juan Carlos Quintero Herencia =

Puerto Rican poet, essayist, and literary critic

Juan Carlos Quintero-Herencia
- Born: 1963 (age 62–63); Santurce, Puerto Rico
- Education: University of Puerto Rico, Río Piedras Campus; Princeton University
- Occupations: Poet, essayist, literary critic, professor
- Writing career
- Language: Spanish
- Notable works: El hilo para el marisco / Cuaderno de los envíos, La máquina de la salsa, Fulguración del espacio, La hoja de mar, De la queda(era), Minotauro en mar chiquita
- Notable awards: Puerto Rican PEN Club Poetry Prize (2004); Premio Iberoamericano, Latin American Studies Association

Juan Carlos Quintero-Herencia (born in Santurce, Puerto Rico) is a Puerto Rican poet, essayist, and literary critic whose work explores the dynamics between poetics, politics, and sensoriality in Latin American and Caribbean writing.

Quintero-Herencia earned a B.A. from the University of Puerto Rico and both an M.A. and Ph.D. in Hispanic Literature from Princeton University. From 1992 to 2001, he taught in the Department of Hispanic Studies at the University of Puerto Rico, Río Piedras, and between 1998 and 2000 he served as an Andrew W. Mellon Research Associate at Brown University. He later joined the University of Maryland, College Park, where he teaches Latin American and Caribbean literatures and literary theory.

== Poetry ==
As a poet, Quintero-Herencia has published several award-winning collections recognized for their rich imagery, experimental language, and exploration of Caribbean experience. His book El hilo para el marisco / Cuaderno de los envíos (Instituto de Cultura Puertorriqueña, 2002) received the Puerto Rican PEN Club Poetry Prize.

Other poetry collections include La caja negra (Isla Negra, 1996), Libro del sigiloso (Terranova, 2012), El cuerpo del milagro (Bokeh, 2016), and Minotauro en mar chiquita (La Criba, 2023).

== Critical work ==
Quintero-Herencia is the author of Fulguración del espacio: Letras e imaginario institucional de la Revolución cubana (1960–1971) (Beatriz Viterbo Editora, 2002), a study of the intellectual and cultural debates of the Cuban Revolution, which received the Premio Iberoamericano from the Latin American Studies Association (LASA).

His second major book, La máquina de la salsa: Tránsitos del sabor (Vértigo, 2005; revised and expanded edition, Almenara Press, 2021), examines the aesthetics and politics of salsa as a poetic and sensorial machine.

Later works include La hoja de mar (:) Efecto archipiélago I (Almenara Editores, 2016) and De la queda(era): Imagen, tiempo y detención (La Criba / Editorial El Cangrejo, 2021). He is currently completing Palabra al mar (§) Efecto archipiélago II.

Quintero-Herencia has also edited Caribe abierto: Ensayos críticos (Iberoamericana / Instituto Internacional de Literatura Iberoamericana, 2012) and Desistencia y polémica en el Caribe: Imagen, crítica, política (Almenara, 2024).

== Recognition and fellowships ==
Quintero-Herencia has received fellowships from the Ford Foundation, the Andrew W. Mellon Foundation, the Instituto de Cultura Puertorriqueña / National Endowment for the Arts, and the John Simon Guggenheim Memorial Foundation.

His work engages modern and contemporary Latin American literature, Puerto Rican and Cuban letters, Caribbean poetics, literary theory, and the relationships between writing, politics, and the senses.

== See also ==
- Puerto Rican literature
- Caribbean literature
- Latin American poetry
