= Kenneth Vidia Parmasad =

Indo-Trinidadian writer (1946–2006)

Kenneth Vidia Parmasad (1946 – 17 April 2006) was an Indo-Trinidadian writer who specialized in writing children's books. Parmasad was also a noted lecturer at the University of the West Indies in St. Augustine.

Parmasad was responsible for writing and collecting classic Indian folk stories for the Caribbean that had been passed down orally by the Indian indentured servants who were brought to the region in 1838. Parmasad's most notable work, Salt and Roti: Indian Folk Tales of the Caribbean (1984), was the first collection of Indian folk tales in the Caribbean.

== Education ==
Parmasad attended the University of the West Indies in St. Augustine as an undergraduate where he earned a B.A.degree in Caribbean studies. He would later go on to lecture at his alma mater for many years on the same subject.

== Salt and Roti (1984) ==
Perhaps his most notable work, Salt and Roti is a collection of Parmasad's Indian folk tales of the Caribbean. The collection features sixteen different stories that include the titular "Salt and Roti" as well as "Sakchulee and the Rich Gentleman" and "Three Wise Fools".

=== List of folk tales ===
- "The Cat and the Rat"
- "The Donkey that Tried to Bark"
- "Three Wise Fools"
- "The Golden Hair"
- "Saved by Common Sense"
- "The Foolish King"
- "The Voice of the Flute"
- "The Poisoned Roti"
- "The Cunning Fox"
- "Myna and Tota"
- "Kingdom of the Blind"
- "King Frog and the Snake"
- "Rites of the Dead"
- "The Pig Saves the King's Life"
- "Sakchulee and the Rich Gentleman"
- "Salt and Roti"

=== "Salt and Roti" folk tale synopsis ===
A poor woman has nothing to feed her son except salt and roti, yet the boy eats it every day excitedly. Every day, on the boys way to work he pulls on the tail of one of the King's elephants to test his strength. The kings men notice the elephant is ill and discovering that the boy is pulling on the tail, they tell the king. The king desires what makes this boy so strong so they go to his mother and she tells them: "Salt and Roti". The king instructs the woman not to give the boy salt with his roti anymore, to which she acquiesces. The boy begins to lose his strength and eventually dies, much to the kings delight as he believes he has discovered the key to unlimited strength. The tale ends with the king proclaiming to all his people that they must now only eat salt and roti. The townspeople, shocked by this decree, leave as they all whisper "The King is mad. The King is mad."

== "Sakchulee and the Rich Gentleman" ==
In this classic trickster tale, Parmasad describes the life of a poor orphaned servant boy, Sakchulee, in the care of his elder brother. In order to take care of Sakchulee, the elder brother gets a job for a Rich Gentleman, but his job comes with a stipulation: if the Rich Gentleman dismisses the elder brother from his job, then the elder brother gets to cut off the Rich Gentleman's nose and ears; however, if the elder brother quits, the Rich Gentleman gets to cut off his nose and ears. The Rich Gentleman tasks the elder brother to fill a barrel with water, but he finds that no matter how hard he tries, he is unable to fill the barrel. Eventually, the elder brother quits in frustration and surrenders his nose and ears to the Gentleman, returning to Sakchulee in defeat.

Sakchulee swears revenge on the Rich Gentleman and takes his elder brothers job with the same agreement. Sakchulee, much more clever than his older brother, discovers that the barrel has holes in the bottom and so he plugs them and successfully fills the barrel, quite to the Gentleman's surprise. So then, the Gentleman tasks Sakchulee to watch his horse. Sakchulee cuts of the horses' tail and sticks it in an ant-hill, telling the Rich Gentleman the horse got away from him and hid in the ant-hill, refusing to come out. The Rich Gentleman is livid at Sakchulee, but fearing to lose his ears and nose, does not dismiss him and rather tasks him to watch the cattle. The Rich Gentleman specifically requests Sakchulee "be sure that, every day, you take the cattle to the waterhole", but does not explicitly say to feed them, so Sakchulee lets them starve. The Gentleman once again was outraged but tasked Sakchulee to tend the sheep. Sakchulee proceeded to kill a sheep each day and eat it, then returned to the Gentleman saying that a robber had stolen them.

Eventually, driven mad by Sakchulee and fearing to lose sing his ears and nose, the Rich Gentleman attempts to flee, but Sakchulee hides himself in their box of food suspecting the Gentlemans' treachery. That night, Sakchulee reveals himself, to the horror of the Gentleman. The Rich Gentleman conceives a plan to be rid of Sakchulee: as they prepared to sleep, he told Sakchulee to sleep nearest the river, then in the middle of the night, he whispered to his wife to push Sakchulee into the river. When the Rich Gentleman woke in the morning, he discovers it is just him and Sakchulee. The Rich Gentleman asks where his wife is, to which Sakchulee replies, "Last night, you whispered in my ear that I should push her into the river. That's what I did!"

The two continue to the Rich Gentleman's recently deceased wife's family's house, and the next morning as the Rich Gentleman attempts to remove the chamber pot, Sakchulee wakes up the family screaming that the Rich Gentleman was angry with them and was leaving. As the family tries to stop the Rich Gentleman, he drops the chamber pot and the contents splash the entire family.

Completely embarrassed and ruined, the Rich Gentleman finally begs Sakchulee to take his ears and nose and "once more, Sakchulee obeyed his master's command". Sakchulee then proudly returns home to his elder brother with his new trophies.

== Themes ==
Parmasad was a descendant of Indian indentured laborers that were brought over to the Caribbean starting in 1838 after the end of chattel slavery in the British colonies in the Caribbean. As a result of indentured servitude, Indian culture suffered under white-supremacist British colonial rule. Parmasad's works, which frequently feature a king or a wealthy white colonialist, strive to humanize these seemingly larger-than-life figures. Parmasad tends to employ classic comedic stock characters such as the trickster (known as Sakchulee in Trinidad folklore) and the simpleton as well the omnipotent yet foolish king. There is a running commentary against colonialism throughout Parmasad's tales, and often shows how a group that is subjugated takes action (whether honorably or through trickery) to dispose of their power. Another larger theme of Parmasad's is Indian culture. Parmasad's goal was to protect and promote Indian culture in the Caribbean, which was struggling under colonialism. Indeed, Frank Birbalsingh points out that Sakchulee's defense of his brother represents Indo-Caribbean resistance against the oppression of indenture in the same way that stories of Anansi represent African resistance against colonialism and slavery" (120). Similarly, Victor J. Ramraj notes that the story "Rites of the Dead" "warns how easy it is for children of immigrants to lose their cultural and religious heritage" (202).

== Bibliography ==
- 1973: Kheesas: Local Indian Folk Tales
- 1983: The Broken Flute: A Caribbean Story for Children
- 1984: Salt and Roti: Indian Folk Tales of the Caribbean
- 1985: Arising: Fifth Anniversary Anthology
- 1987: Child of the Storms and Other Poems
- 1988: See the Sunlight: A Caribbean Collection of Poems and Proverbs for Children

== See also ==
- Caribbean literature
- Caribbean poetry
