= Emilie Maresse-Paul =

Trinidadian writer and intellectual (1838–1900)

- Born: Emilie Maresse; 1838; Trinidad
- Died: 1900 (aged 61–62); Trinidad and Tobago
- Other names: Emilie Maresse-Smith
- Occupation(s): Writer, feminist
- Years active: 1860s–1890s

Emilie Maresse-Paul (1838–1900) was a Trinidadian intellectual and writer of the 19th century. One of the only examples of nineteenth-century women intellectuals in the British West Indies, she wrote about secular education and was staunchly anti-clerical. Believing in reason, she championed equality before the law and discounted prejudices against people because of their skin color, gender or social standing.

== Early life ==
Emilie Maresse was born in 1838 in Trinidad. She was the daughter of Mrs. Prosper Maresse and a descendant of Narcisse St. Tour, a free-colored man, who had immigrated to Trinidad from Martinique in 1782. Educated at home by tutors, she studied European literature and was fluent in both English and French. Endorsing reason, she followed the values of the French Enlightenment and had a marked hostility toward authoritarian rule and organized religion.

At the age of eighteen, Maresse married Alexander Smith, and in a unique move for her time, retained her maiden name. She made sure also that her two children kept her name using Maresse-Smith as their surname. The couple's son Edgar Maresse-Smith would become a leading figure in Trinidad's politics at the turn of the twentieth century. Smith died young in the early 1860s, shortly after Edgar's birth.

== Career ==
To earn a living, Maresse-Smith tutored students and taught her own two children. She remarried P. A. Paul, taking the surname Maresse-Paul. Between 1880 and her death in 1900, she published articles in the press in Trinidad and Grenada. Most of the articles were written in French and were critiques of government policies to eliminate French culture, expand colonialist policies, and in general anyone who could be construed as an oppressive force in society. Staunchly against crown rule, she did not hesitate to criticize men who were elected or in leadership positions. She wrote about secular education and assailed the Catholic Church for its interference in public education. She also wrote in favour of women having a voice in political matters and being allowed to work as men did, long before a feminist movement was born in the Caribbean.

Maresse-Paul's views were decidedly radical for the Victorian era and she championed non-whites and the poor. Discounting prejudices against women, blacks and those who lived in poverty as something that must be removed from society, she disparaged those who thought themselves superior, arguing that under the law all should be equal. She believed all people had intellectual capacity, no matter their station or natural differences.

== Death and legacy ==
Maresse-Paul died in Trinidad in 1900. She is remembered as one of the few known women intellectuals of the British West Indies in the nineteenth century.
