= Patricia Turnbull =

Patricia G. Turnbull (born 1952) is a poet from Saint Lucia. In 1991, she was awarded the Cedars Prize for Contemporary Poetry.

== Life ==
Patricia Turnbull was born in Saint Lucia. She gained a BA at the University of the West Indies in 1974, and an MSc in English education from Syracuse University in 1986. She has worked as a business communication consultant, a Saint Lucian Creole translator and speech coach, and an English teacher and department chair.

Turnbull won the Cedars Prize for Contemporary Poetry in 1991.

Man-made destruction of hillside plants – even before St Lucia was threatened by Hurricane Maria in 2017 – moved Turnbull to write a children's book, Ti Koko and Kush Kush (2018), about an unlikely friendship in a Caribbean garden. At the book's launch, Turnbull called for more community support for literary artists.

== Works ==
- (ed.) Let's Take a Dip, by Alein O'Neil. Castries, St Lucia: UNESCO, 1984.
- (ed.) Boysie and the Genips, and other stories, by Jennie Wheatley. Kingston: UNESCO, 1984.
- Rugged Vessels: Poems, 1992
- Ti Koko and Kush Kush, Philipsburg, St. Martin: House of Nehesi Publishers, 2018. Illustrated by Reuben Vanterpool.
- Ti Koko and Kush Kush, Philipsburg, St. Martin: House of Nehesi Publishers, 2024 (Second Printing). Illustrated by Reuben Vanterpool.
