= Pierre Lauffer =

Curaçao writer and poet

- Born: Pierre Antoine Lauffer; 22 August 1920; Curaçao
- Died: 14 June 1981 (aged 60); Willemstad, Curaçao
- Occupations: Writer and poet
- Notable work: Kumbu (1955); Kantika pa Bientu (1964)

Pierre Lauffer (22 August 1920 – 14 June 1981) was a Curaçaoan writer and poet who mainly wrote in Papiamentu. He is considered one of the greatest poets of Curaçao.

== Biography ==
Lauffer was born on 22 August 1920 as Pierre Antoine Lauffer. He graduated from the Mulo (junior high school) in 1936, and started various jobs as a civil servant, a military policeman, and an undertaker. During this time, he was writing stories and poetry as a hobby. His first publication was a story in Dutch for the magazine De Stoep.

In 1944 Patria, his first poetry collection in Papiamentu, was published. It received a negative review from De Stoep who questioned the usefulness of a poetry book which a mere 100,000 people could read. In 1950, Lauffer co-founded the magazine Simadán written entirely in Papiamentu in order to compete with De Stoep. The magazine would only have three editions. In 1955, he published Kumbu with rhythmic poetry. It was the first publication of modernist poetry in Papiamentu with an emphasis on the emotional value of the words.

In 1964, Lauffer published Kantika pa Bientu for which he was awarded a prize by the Cultural Centre Curaçao. The publications were not a commercial success given the limited market, and in 1965, Lauffer became an English school teacher. At the age of 47, he fell in love with an 18-year-old woman, and married for the second time. The marriage didn't last, and his poetry became more melancholic. In 1969, Lauffer was awarded the Cola Debrot Prize for his poetry. In 1970, he became a Papiamentu teacher at the Pedagogical Academy.

In his later years, Lauffer started to write children's books in Papiamentu, because he felt that children were being neglected by the few Papiamentu writers. Lauffer died on 14 June 1981, at the age of 60.

== Legacy ==
On 16 July 1981, Fundashon Pierre Lauffer was established in his honour to promote Papiamentu. The Premio Bienal Pierre Lauffer is a biannual prize for people who have earned merits for the advancement of Papiamentu. In 1982, the Mgr Zwijssen College where Lauffer used to teach was renamed Kolegio Pierre Lauffer.
