= Dimitry Elias Léger =

Haitian-American writer

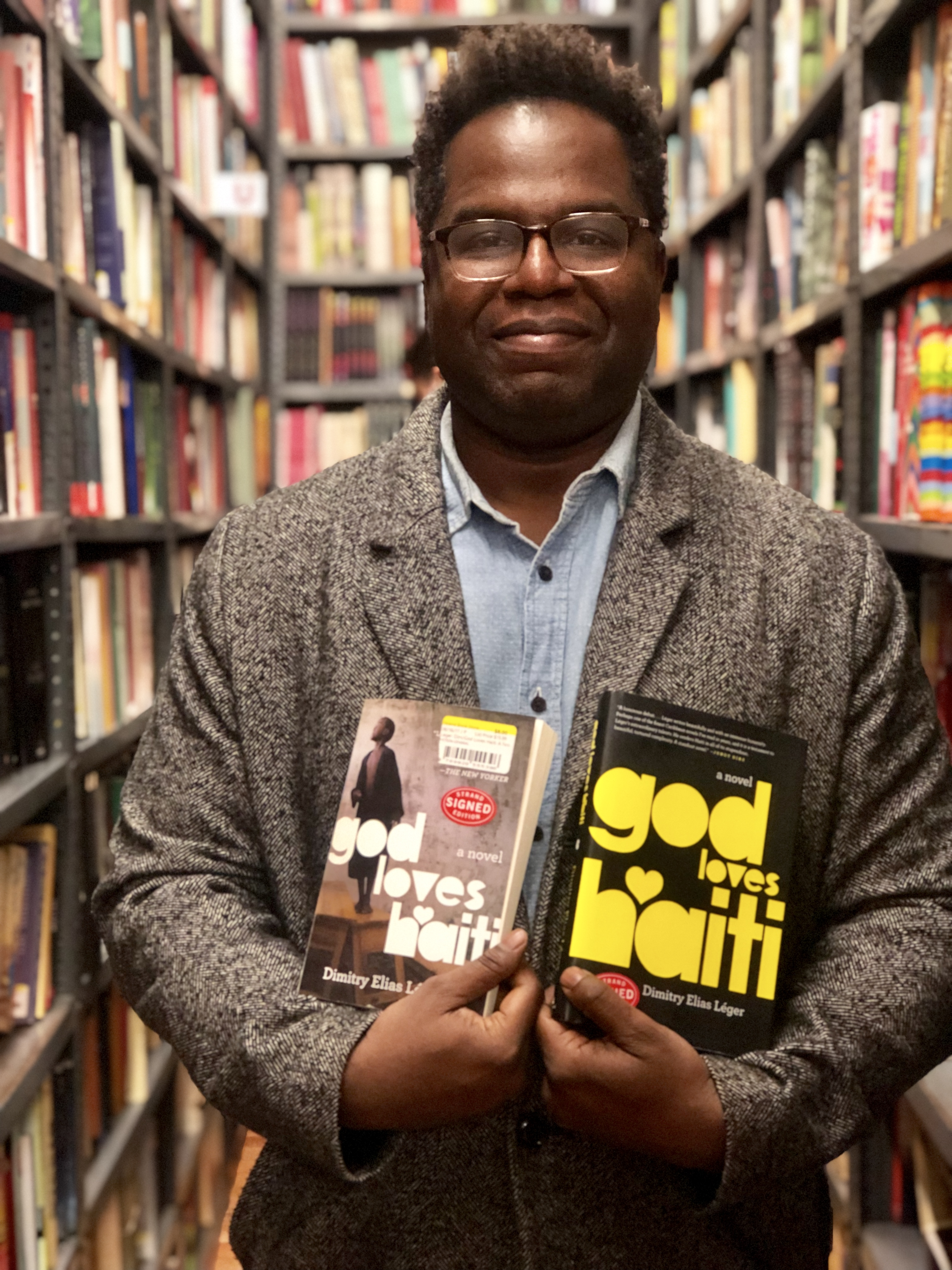
- Dimitry Elias Léger in a New York City bookstore
- Born: September 27, 1971 (age 54); Port-au-Prince, Haiti
- Occupation: Novelist
- Writing career
- Language: English
- Genre: fiction
- Notable work: God Loves Haiti
- Website: dimitryleger.tumblr.com

Dimitry Elias Léger (born September 27, 1971) is a Haitian-American novelist, journalist, and humanitarian. Léger is best known for the acclaimed novel God Loves Haiti (2015), which the New York Times praised as "a powerful portrait of a nation in peril and the citizens who inhabit it". His second novel Death of the Soccer God will be published in May 2026. His writing has appeared in many magazines and newspapers. Since 2010, he has worked as a communications advisor at the United Nations around the world, including in Haiti, Switzerland, and Mali.

== Biography ==
Dimitry Elias Léger was born in Port-au-Prince, Haiti, on September 27, 1971. His childhood life alternated between New York City and Port-au-Prince until the age of 14, when he permanently moved to Brooklyn. He became a journalist in 1993 and worked as deputy editor of The Source magazine and a staff writer at Fortune magazine, The Miami Herald and MTV News. His writing has also appeared in The New York Times op-ed page, The Washington Post "Book World", The New York Observer and the now defunct The Face magazine in the UK. He became an advisor to the United Nations following the 2010 Haiti earthquake.

== Reception ==
Léger's publication of the novel God Loves Haiti with HarperCollins on January 6, 2015, led Time Out New York to declare the book "one of the year's most powerful debut novels". The New York Observer hailed Léger as an "important new voice". The newspaper noted the book's "peppery Port-au-Prince slang and untranslated French phrases" in a "melodic and unpredictable debut". The New Yorker magazine noted "Léger writes with fabulist exuberance and an eye for the absurd". In the New York Times Book Review, critic Regina Marler offered a similar assessment of the novel's “uneasy tone” that is "satirical-romantic, tragicomic, cynical-sentimental."

Dante scholars praised the connection between God Loves Haiti and the Divine Comedy, the 700-year-old poem by the Italian writer Dante Alighieri. A review in the website Dante Today said, "If you are looking for The Divine Comedy in God Loves Haiti, imagine what Dante’s three-story structure might look like after an earthquake. In Léger’s narrative landscape, Inferno, Purgatario, Paradiso are collapsed onto each other in a heap of dust and rubble. There's room to regret past choices; there's no clear route to paradise. Yet in the hellish expanses of destruction Léger manages to uncover shards of redemptive beauty and even a medieval plot twist: his eventual solution to the love triangle is far more Beatrice than Beyoncé."

== Awards and honors ==
- 2016 PEN/Open Book Award finalist for God Loves Haiti

== Education ==
Léger holds a bachelor's degree in journalism from St. John's University. He studied international development in the mid-career masters in public administration program at Harvard Kennedy School of Government. In 2005, he was awarded a global leadership fellowship from the World Economic Forum, the Geneva, Switzerland-based foundation famous for organizing the World Economic Forum, an annual gathering of world leaders and CEOs in Davos, Switzerland.
