= Clara Rosa De Lima =

Trinidadian novelist and poet (born 1922)

- Born: 27 July 1922; Trinidad
- Alma mater: Long Island University
- Occupation: Novelist, writer

Clara Rosa De Lima (born 27 July 1922) is a Trinidadian novelist, poet, journalist and art dealer.

== Life and career ==
Clara Rosa De Lima was born in Trinidad on 27 July 1922. She was one of seven children of Yldefonsa De Lima and Rosario De Lima. Yldefonso, from a Spanish family with Sephardic roots, founded the successful Y De Lima and Co. jewelry store. His first wife, Josefita Diaz, died in 1910 and he married his late wife's fourteen year old niece Rosario. He died when Clara was four years old, leaving her mother a widow with six children at age 26.

Her novels include Currents of the Yuma (1978), about peasants under the dictatorship of Rafael Trujillo.

De Lima and Stella Beaubrun opened the Art Creators gallery in Port of Spain in 1978. Future Nobel Prize winner Derek Walcott sold his paintings through De Lima and she served as co-producer for a 1980 production of his play Marie Laveau.

Trinidadian artist Adrian Camps-Campins, a painter of historical scenes from Trinidadian history, painted De Lima's July 1929 seventh birthday party in 1989. The painting was used on a greeting card published by UNICEF in 1993.

== Bibliography ==
=== Novels ===
- Tomorrow Will Always Come, Obolensky, 1965.
- Not Bad Just a Little Mad, Stockwell, 1975.
- Currents of the Yuna, Stockwell, 1978.
- Countdown to Carnival, Stockwell, 1978.
- Kilometre Nineteen, Stockwell, 1980.

=== Poetry ===
- Thoughts and Dreams, Stockwell, 1973.
- Dreams Non Stop, Stockwell, 1974.
- Reminiscing, Stockwell, 1975.
