= Chiqui Vicioso =

Dominican writer

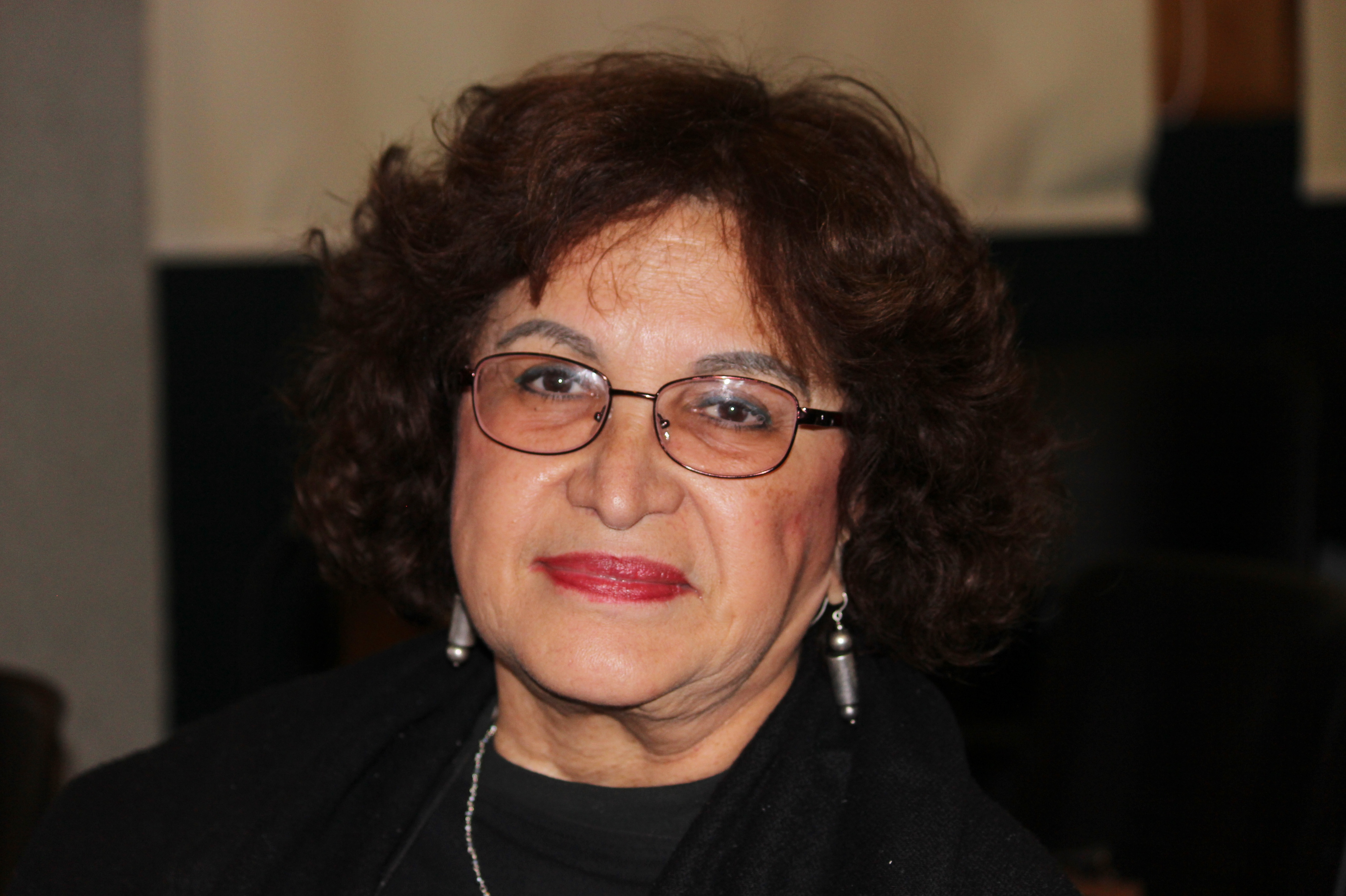
Vicioso in 2018

Luisa Angélica Sherezada Vicioso (born 21 June 1948), better known as Chiqui Vicioso, is a Dominican poet, playwright, essayist, feminist activist and author of twenty books.

== Education and career ==
The daughter of Maria Luisa Sánchez, a poet, and Juan Antonio Vicioso Contín, a composer, illustrator and also a poet, Chiqui Vicioso was born on 21 June 1948, in Santo Domingo in the Dominican Republic. In 1967, at the age of 19, she left the country, along with her family, to study for her first degree, in sociology and Latin American history, at Brooklyn College in New York. She also earned a master's degree in educational program design at Columbia University, then went on to study for a semester in the administration of cultural projects at the Getulio Vargas Foundation in Rio de Janeiro, Brazil. After living abroad for many years in the United States and Brazil, she returned to Santo Domingo in the early 1980s.

Vicioso was director of the Education Department of Pro-Familia (1981–1985), an NGO offering family clinics and sex education. She also worked as a regional consultant in Santo Domingo on women's issues (1987–1995) for UNICEF. In 1983 she founded the Circle of Women Poets or Círculo de Mujeres Poetas in New York. (Cuban Theater Digital Archive https://ctda.miami.edu/creator/860). In 2012, Vicioso stood as a vice presidential candidate for Alianza País, a political party.

== Writing ==
While living in the United States, Vicioso managed to maintain contact with the arts in the Dominican Republic, reporting for a periodical published by Casa de Teatro and interviewing writers in New York. She has also been a columnist for the newspaper Listín Diario Hoy, a contributor to La Noticia (now defunct) and head of the literary page Cantidad Hechizada at El Nuevo Diario. She is a columnist for the newspaper El Nacional.

Her first book, Viaje desde el Agua (Journey from the water), started in the United States, was published in the Dominican Republic in 1981.

Collections of Vicioso's poetry include Viaje desde el agua (Journey from the water, 1981), Un extraño ulular traía el viento (A strange wailing of the wind, 1985), Volver a vivir: ensayos sobre Nicaragua, (To live again: essays on Nicaragua, 1985), Internamiento (1992), and Eva/Sión/es (2007).

Vicioso published a biography of the Puerto Rican poet Julia de Burgos, titled Julia de Burgos: La nuestra (1990). As an essayist, Vicioso has published Algo que decir (Ensayos críticos sobre literatura escrita por mujeres) (1991).

In 2003 she wrote the monologue Nuyor/Islas, which premiered in Santo Domingo and soon after in Upper Manhattan.

== Awards ==
- 1988 Caonabo de Oro.
- 1992 Medalla de Mérito Oro (outstanding woman of the year) awarded by the Dirección General de Promoción de la Mujer.
- 1997 Premio Nacional de Teatro for her play Wish-ky Sour.
- 2022 Proyecto Anticanon The Anticanon Lifetime Achievement Award for Literary Women.
