= Tip Marugg =

Curaçao writer and poet (1923–2006)

Silvio Alberto (Tip) Marugg (1923–2006) was a Dutch-Curaçaoan writer and poet, best known for his 1988 novel De morgen loeit weer aan (translated into English as The Roar of Morning). His style is best characterized as a variation on magic realism. Marugg wrote poetry before publishing three novels; he is also the author of Dikshonario Erotiko, a dictionary of all words with an erotic meaning used in Papiamentu.

== Biography ==
=== Ancestry ===
Marugg's ancestors on his father's side hail from the Swiss town of Klosters, and moved to the Netherlands. His great-great-great-grandfather was born in Amsterdam in 1784; he was a surgeon who left for Curaçao in 1804 where he married Elisabeth Schul(d)er. Silvio Alberto Marugg was the son of Johann Isaac Abraham Marugg (1893-1968) and Johanna Helena Curiel (1887-1961); he was one of seven siblings who survived infancy. His mother was from Curaçao but had been raised in Venezuela.

=== Youth and schooling; military service and first literary exploits ===
Marugg, whose nickname at home was "Tip", was born in Willemstad, Curaçao, on 16 December 1923, in the Roman-Catholic district Otrabanda, where his father owned a grocery store. He went to the local Catholic school because the Protestant school, across the bay in Punda, was too far away. He attended the MULO at the Saint Thomas college, and then the Algemene middelbare school. By the time he turned 18, World War 2 was in full swing, and he was called up for military service, despite being enrolled in school. He was in the army for five years, until 1947. Official reports from that period describe him as calm, honest, polite, intelligent, and a conscientious worker. Most of the time he was guarding oil installations and the harbor, where German U-boat attacks could be expected. He tried to do his guard duties with friends with whom he could discuss literature, and published his first poems in the magazine De Stoep in 1945. Starting in 1948, he published book reviews in La Prensa. After his military service he worked for various divisions of Shell, and ended up as editor of De Passaat, the company newspaper. He wrote prodigiously for the magazine though often without byline. His editor in chief was Oscar (Paachi) van Kampen, publisher of a humor magazine, Lorita Real, which he let Marugg write and edit whenever he was away or on vacation. By then Marugg had made writing his profession, in Dutch and in Papiamento.

=== Literary career ===
Marugg's first literary publications were surrealist poems published in De Stoep between 1946 and 1951. A foundational theme in his work is the inability to live an authentic life, and fate, dead, and night are recurrent elements in his poetry, which is influenced by Hendrik Marsman. He was deeply engaged with many literary activities on the island, including the Cultureel Centrum Curaçao, founded in 1949, for whom he made a Dutch-language version of Shakespeare's Twelfth Night. He wrote a regular column for the magazine El Dorado (1949-1950), sat on awards juries, and tried his hand at painting. He visited various countries in the Americas, and in 1957-1958 spent a few months in the Netherlands, which he found to be cold. De Passaat, one of the best-looking magazines on the island, was published monthly in Dutch, Papiamento, English, Spanish, and Portuguese from 1944 to 1960, after which it became a quarterly for a few years and ceased publication in 1963; Marugg was editor in chief for the last few years.

He published his first novel in 1957; Weekend pelgrimage has the economic and political situation of Curaçao as a subject, and expresses a distaste for industrialization. The novel was published first in the magazine Antilliaanse Cahiers, and then as a book. It made him known in the Netherlands, and it was translated into English by Roy Edwards in 1960 as Weekend Pilgrimage, making him the first writer from the Dutch Antilles to be translated into English. His second novel, In de straten van Tepalka, was published in 1967; he retired from Shell three years later after 23 years with the company. He lived in Willemstad for a few more years and then moved to Pannekoek, a small community in the Bandabou district, on the western part of the island. The dry and hot steppe-like landscape appears frequently in his writing. He lived alone, with his dogs. Existential loneliness is the subject of In de straten van Tepalka (1967); an ingenious doubling of characters allows the first-person narrator to make fun of himself without turning the novel into melodrama. His collected poetry was published in 1976 as Afschuw van licht.

For many years Marugg worked on his third novel. A handwritten manuscript was typed out at the University of the Dutch Antilles, then brought to Amsterdam for publication. De morgen loeit weer aan (1988) was an instant success; it was reprinted six times in the first year. It was nominated for the AKO Literature Prize, and he won the Cola Debrot award in Curaçao (1989). In 1991 he published Un prinsipio pa un Dikshonario Erotika Papiamentu, an alphabetical list of words and expressions in Papiamento pertaining to love, eroticism, and sex. Initially refused by publishers on Curaçao, it is a linguistic study demonstrating Marugg's deep knowledge of Dutch and Papiamento.

The semi-autobiographical nature of his writing has led to misunderstandings; after his rise to fame for De morgen loeit weer aan, some of these details, combined with outlandish stories about his life in a remote area of Curaçao, appeared in newspapers--that he had lived in Venezuela, that his mother was Venezuelan, that he was an atheist who wandered around drunk at night, that the military police had pulled him out of school. Such details are incorrect.

In 2001, De morgen loeit weer aan was republished in a single volume along with Weekend pelgrimage and In de straten van Tepalka. A collected works was published in 2009, as De hemel is van korte duur. Verzameld werk 1945-1995, edited by Aart G. Broek and Wim Rutgers. Petra Possel verzamelde in Niemand is een eiland (2009) is a collection of interviews and conversations with Marugg, edited by Petra Possel.

== Bibliography ==
- 1957 - Weekendpelgrimage
- 1967 - In de straten van Tepalka
- 1976 - Afschuw van licht; gedichten 1946-1951 (poems)
- 1988 - De morgen loeit weer aan (novel; English: "The roar of morning")
- 1990 - De morgen loeit weer aan (poems)
- 1992 - Un prinsipio pa un dikshonario erótiko papiamentu
- 2009 - De hemel is van korte duur
