= Cecil Gray (poet) =

Caribbean writer (1923–2020)

Cecil Gray (February 11, 1923 – March 14, 2020) was a Caribbean poet, former educator, and the author of several textbooks and anthologies of West Indian literature. He resided in Canada.

== Biography ==
Gray was born in Port of Spain, Trinidad and Tobago, in 1923, and also lived in Jamaica. He obtained a teacher's certificate and an external degree from London University. For over a decade, he served as a Senior Lecturer then as Director of the In-Service Diploma in Education Programme at the Mona and St. Augustine campuses of the University of the West Indies.

Gray's first book of poetry, The Woolgatherer, was largely autobiographical and was published by Peepal Tree Press in 1994. Since then he has published several subsequent collections, including Lillian's Songs (1996), Leaving the Dark (1998), Plumed Palms (2000), Careenage (2003), Only the Waves (2005), Possession (2009), Lighthouses (2011), and "Evening Candles" (2016). His poetry has also been published in the literary journals Bim and Savacou and in anthologies of Caribbean literature. His reading and literature textbooks include Bite In, Language for Life, and Swing Into English, as well as West Indian Poetry: An Anthology for Schools (with Kenneth Ramchand).

In 1976, Gray was awarded the Medal of Merit Class 1 Gold of the Order of the Trinity by the government of Trinidad and Tobago for contributions to education and culture. Most importantly, his efforts contributed significantly to the introduction and integration of West Indian literature into the official curriculum of West Indian secondary schools.
