= Rhea-Simone Auguste =

Trinidad and Tobago journalist

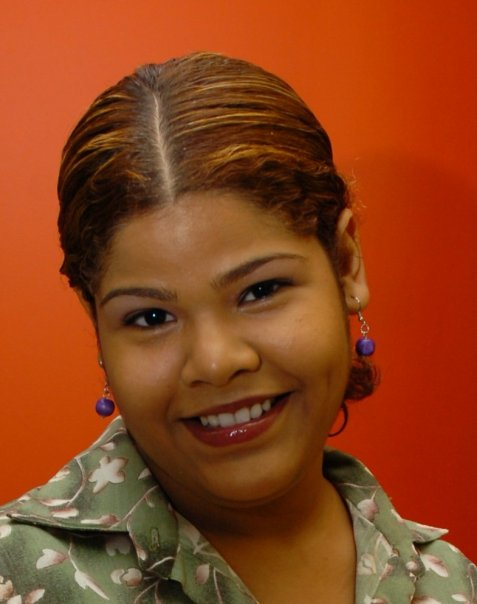
Award-winning Trinidad and Tobago journalist Rhea-Simone Auguste.

Rhea-Simone Auguste (born July 30, 1984) also known as Simmy, is a print journalist and stand-up comedian in Trinidad and Tobago.

== Career history ==
Auguste began her career as a writer contributing to Trinidad's Catholic Newspaper as a Vision reporter at the age of 15. She started a formal career as a reporter with the Trinidad Express in 2003 while still a student at the University of the West Indies pursuing a Bachelor of Arts degree in Literatures in English. Auguste first worked as a fashion reporter and was responsible for numerous exclusive interviews with Trinidad and Tobago's leading designers including Meiling, Heather Jones, Concept Studio and Peter Elias.

While still working as a fashion reporter, Auguste secured exclusive regional interviews for the Woman Express magazine with international actresses Vanessa Williams; interviews with America's Next Top Model Eva "the Diva" Marcille Pigford, Jade Cole and McKey Sullivan.

Auguste also secured entertainment exclusives with Jamaican artiste Tessanne Chin and Digicel Rising Star winners (Trinidad and Tobago edition) Erica Samuel and Kay Alleyne.

The transition to "Simmy" took place in 2017 with Auguste taking the stage as a stand-up comedian and comedy writer in Port of Spain.

== Awards and honours ==
Auguste was awarded the inaugural Camsel/Media Association Award of Trinidad and Tobago LUMEN award for her in-depth child abuse feature stories in 2008 – "Protecting Children's Basic Rights".

Soon after, Auguste took home a local Pan American Health Organization award for her work on health and nutrition.

In late 2008, she copped 4 prestigious regional Pan American Health Organisation Awards for excellence in health reporting and in 2009 she was hosted by the Food and Agriculture Organization in Rome, Italy for her contribution to regional food security reporting.
