= Dennis Scott (writer) =

Jamaican poet, playwright, actor and dancer

Dennis Scott (16 December 1939 – 21 February 1991) was a Jamaican poet, playwright, actor (best known for appearances on The Cosby Show) and dancer. His well-known poem "Marrysong" is used in the IGCSE syllabus. He was also a theatre director and drama teacher.

== Biography ==
Born in Kingston, Jamaica, Scott attended Jamaica College, where he became headboy. He was further educated at the University of the West Indies (UWI), Mona, and taught in Jamaica, Trinidad and Tobago (at Presentation College), and at Yale University in the United States. While at UWI he was the assistant editor of Caribbean Quarterly. Thereafter, he went to Athens, Georgia, on a Shubert Playwriting Fellowship (1970–71), and was later awarded a Commonwealth Fellowship to take an education diploma course in Newcastle upon Tyne, England. He returned to teach at Jamaica College, and then became director of the School of Drama at the Cultural Training Centre in Kingston.

Scott taught at the Yale School of Drama, and was head of the Directing program from 1986 until his death, which occurred in New Haven, Connecticut, at the age of 51.

== Poetry and plays ==
Scott was one of the most significant poets writing in the early post-independence period in Jamaica, and his first published collection, Uncle Time (1973), for which he won the Commonwealth Poetry Prize, is marked by an effective literary use of the vernacular, or "nation language". He has been regarded as one of the main influences for modern Jamaican poetry. His other poetry collections are Dreadwalk: Poems 1970–78 (1982), Strategies (1989) and After-Image (2008).

His plays include Terminus (1966), Dog, and An Echo in the Bone (1974); the latter was published, together with a play by Derek Walcott and one by Errol Hill, in Plays for Today (1985), edited by Hill. Scott's dramatic work is acknowledged as a major influence on the direction of Caribbean theatre.

== Acting ==
Scott was an original member of the National Dance Theatre Company founded by Rex Nettleford in the 1960s. Scott is also known for his role as Lester Tibedeaux in The Cosby Show.
