= Raymond Ramcharitar =

Trinidad and Tobago writer, historian and critic

Raymond R. Ramcharitar is a Trinidadian poet, playwright, fiction writer, historian and media and cultural critic.

== Early life ==
Ramcharitar was educated at the University of the West Indies, St Augustine, where he earned three degrees: a Bachelor's in Economics (1991), a Master's in Literature in English (2002) and a Doctorate in Cultural History (2007). He was awarded a fellowship to Boston University's Creative Writing Program in 2000 by Nobel Laureate Derek Walcott, where he studied poetry and drama.

== Author ==
Ramcharitar's published works include academic and creative books and articles. His book The Island Quintet (fiction), a collection of novellas, was published by Peepal Tree Press, UK, 2009. It was shortlisted for the Commonwealth Writers' Prize for Best First Book, 2010 for the Caribbean & Canada. The Island Quintet was reviewed in the Trinidad & Tobago Review. A reviewer for The Independent compared Ramcharitar's prose to that of Derek Walcott and V. S. Naipaul.

American Fall, a collection of poems described as "confident and engaging", was published by Peepal Tree in 2007.

He published a historical work, A History of Creole Trinidad, 1956-2010 A book of media criticism, Breaking the News, Media & Culture in Trinidad, was published by Lexicon, a Trinidadian publisher (2005).

Ramcharitar's play Paradiso was one of three winners of the Warehouse Theatre's 2002 International Playwriting Festival, and he was invited to the BBC in September 2003, on a radio drama fellowship.

His work as a poet is, unusually for contemporary Caribbean poets, highly formal and entirely in Standard English. He uses traditional forms such as the sonnet, villanelle and sestina. He is influenced by Walcott, Philip Larkin, R. S. Thomas and Wallace Stevens.

As a fiction writer, he has been compared to V. S. Naipaul, but his explicit sensuality and tendency to experimentation display debts to writers as diverse as Umberto Eco and Thomas Pynchon. The epigraph to The Island Quintet was from Pynchon's Gravity's Rainbow.

== Academic ==
As an academic Ramcharitar is a polemical revisionist. His latest work is A History of Creole Trinidad, 1956-2010 (Palgrave Macmillan), which presents a narrative considerably at odds with nationalist histories of Trinidad & Tobago. His doctoral thesis ("The Hidden History of Trinidad: Underground Culture in Trinidad, 1870-1970") provided a "corrective" narrative to the largely ethno-centric historical narratives of West Indian nationalist historians. He has published similarly oriented articles on culture and tourism, literary criticism and history. His work on media and culture—media and collective memory, and the Caribbean emotional economy—seeks to establish a presence in largely untapped areas of Caribbean or West Indian cultural, critical, and media scholarship.

Ramcharitar has lectured in theatre arts, cultural studies, and literature as an adjunct at the University of the West Indies, St Augustine, and as a Communications Consultant in Trinidad. He started writing as a journalist in 1991, working with the Trinidad Guardian, and the Trinidad Express newspapers.

He is currently and Assistant Professor of the Humanities at the American University in Iraq, Baghdad.
