= James Aboud =

Trinidad and Tobago judge and poet

- Born: 1956 (age 69–70); Port of Spain, Trinidad
- Education: University of Western Ontario; University of the West Indies; Polytechnic of London; Middle Temple
- Occupations: Judge and poet
- Awards: James Rodway Poetry Prize

James Christopher Aboud (born 1956) is a Trinidad and Tobago judge and poet. He has published two volumes of poetry, The Stone Rose (1986) and Lagahoo Poems (2003). He was appointed as a judge of the High Court and on 30 October 2020, he was appointed to the Court of Appeal.

== Personal life ==
Aboud was born in 1956 in Woodbrook, a neighbourhood of Port of Spain, Trinidad. He is the son of Jimmy Aboud, a businessman who was called the "Textile King" due to his ownership of a fabric shop, and Lily Elias Aboud. He is of Syrian-Lebanese ancestry. He has three brothers, Gregory, Stephen and Gary Aboud, and one sister, Linda Aboud-Stephen. Aboud is married to Siân Jeary-Aboud and the couple have three daughters: Emily, Catherine Rebecca, and Vivien.

== Career ==
He attended the University of Western Ontario, where he received a degree in English literature in 1978. He then attended the University of the West Indies, receiving a post-graduate diploma in international relations from the St. Augustine campus and an LLB from the Cave Hill campus in 1982. He studied at the Polytechnic of London and at the Middle Temple in England. He was called to the bar of England and Wales and Trinidad and Tobago in 1984. He practiced as a barrister between 1984 and 2006.

=== Literary career ===
Aboud's poems are published under his full name. He has published two volumes of poetry: The Stone Rose (1986) and Lagahoo Poems (2003). Aboud's work has been published in various literary magazines and Caribbean anthologies. In 2004, he was awarded the James Rodway Poetry Prize by Derek Walcott.

=== Legal career ===
Aboud served as commissioner of the Public Utilities Commission from 1987 to 1993. In January 2006, he was appointed to the High Court where he served at the Supreme Court in San Fernando until December 2007. In 2010, he was appointed a permanent judge of the High Court. He was chairman of the committee that wrote the Handbook on Damages for False Imprisonment and Malicious Prosecution in Trinidad and Tobago. He was also on the board of the National Flour Mills.

As a High Court judge, Aboud heard the case of Kublalsingh and Others v Attorney General of Trinidad and Tobago, which concerned the construction of a major highway in Trinidad and Tobago. An injunction was sought to stop the construction of the multibillion-dollar highway, but the court refused it. He also heard Rambachan v Warner, where Trinidadian politician Surujrattan Rambachan sued Jack Warner for defamation. In July 2016, the case was settled by a TT$375,000 payment from Warner. He was also the judge for the case of Jack Warner v Attorney General of Trinidad and Tobago, in which the extradition to the United States of former FIFA executive Jack Warner was being contested. On 28 September 2017, Aboud issued a 50-page decision, allowing the extradition while granting Warner 28 days for an additional appeal.

On 30 October 2020, he was appointed to the Court of Appeal.
