= Ina Césaire =

Martinican playwright (1942–2025)

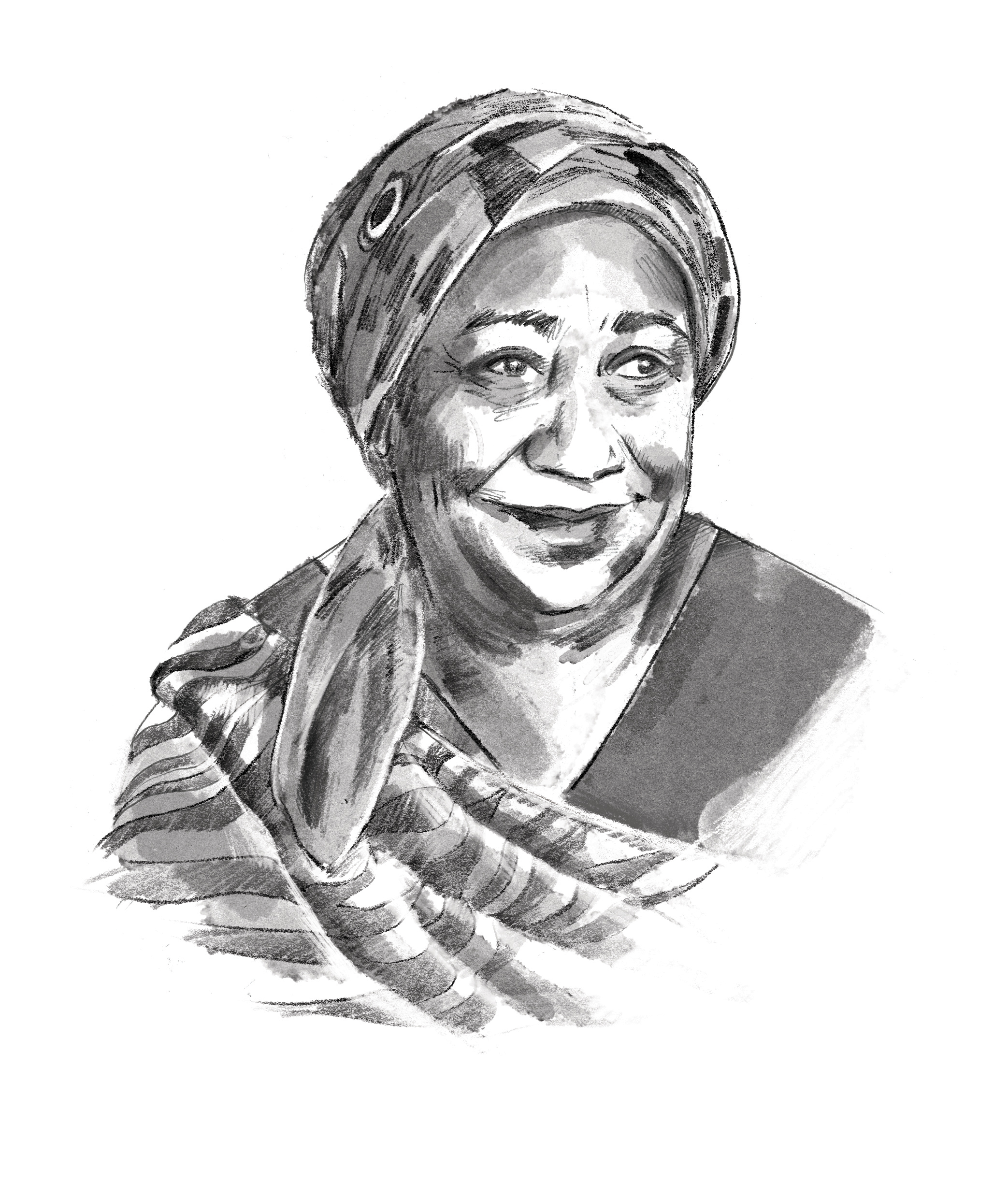
- Born: 13 October 1942; Martinique
- Died: 24 June 2025 (aged 82); Martinique
- Occupations: Ethnographer, writer, playwright, dramaturgist
- Parent(s): Aimé Césaire; Suzanne Césaire

Ina Césaire (French: [ina sezɛʁ]; 13 October 1942 – 24 June 2025) was a French playwright and ethnographer. In her 1981 article "Littérature orale et contes", "she discusses how Caribbean story tales are true 'révélateur' of that [Caribbean] spirit and affirms that the role of Caribbean folktale is to represent the culture."

== Background ==
Ina Césaire was born on 13 October 1942, as the daughter of the author and politician Aimé Césaire. Her mother, Suzanne Césaire, was a French writer from Martinique whose work is connected with the Francophone Negritude movement.

Césaire died on 24 June 2025, at the age of 82.

== Playwright ==
Césaire’s dramatic works owe much to oral story-telling. Her "conte-inspired theatrical works show a progression from fully adapting a conte to the stage in her early plays, to inserting elements of conte or storytelling in later works, to updating certain contes by adapting them to a contemporary setting in more recent plays. Her first play L’Enfant des Passages ou la Geste de Ti-Jean (1987), for instance, is a dramatic treatment of the adventures of an archetypal conte character Ti-Jean. Several of her other plays feature a narrator character who echoes the figure of the conteur from the conte tradition."

== Works ==
=== Plays ===
- Mémoires d'Isles, Maman N. et Maman F. Paris: Editions Caribéennes, 1985.
- L'Enfant des Passages ou la Geste de Ti-Jean. Paris: Editions Caribéennes, 1987.
- La Maison close (inéd.). création 1991.
- Rosanie Soleil. Paris: Soc. Des Auteurs et Compositeurs Dramatiques, 1992. création 1992.

=== In English ===
- "Island Memories". Translation, Christiane Makward et J. Miller. Plays by French and Francophone Women. Ann Arbor: University of Michigan Press, 1994: 49–74. ISBN 978-0-472-08258-2
- "Fire's Daughters (Rosanie Soleil)". Translation. Judith G. Miller: New French Language Plays. New York: Ubu Repertory Theatre, 1993: 1–53.

=== Novels ===
- Zonzon Tête Carrée. Monaco: Ed. du Rocher, 1994 ISBN 978-2-268-01801-0; Monaco: Alphée/Le Serpent à Plumes, 2004.
- Aimé Césaire, 10 ans déjà, éditions L'Esprit du Temps, 2018 ISBN 978-2-84795-432-6, with Patrick Singaïny

== Reviews ==
- Bruckner, D. J. R. (20 October 1993). "Theater in Review". The New York Times.
- Miyasaki, June, "Writing the Landscape of Memory: Ina Cesaire's Memoires d'Isles", Journal of Caribbean Literatures, 22 June 2009.
