= Michèle Pearson Clarke =

Trinidadian filmmaker

- Born: February 16, 1973 (age 53); Port of Spain, Trinidad
- Education: Queen's University; University of Toronto; Ryerson University
- Occupations: Filmmaker; Photographer
- Years active: 2005–present
- Website: MichelePearsonClarke.com

Michèle Pearson Clarke (born February 16, 1973) is a Trinidadian filmmaker and photographer based in Toronto, Ontario, Canada.

== Early life ==
Clarke was born in Port of Spain, Trinidad, and was educated at Queen's University and the University of Toronto. She received her MFA from Ryerson University in 2015.

== Career ==
Her first film, Surrounded by Water, was completed through the Liaison of Independent Filmmakers of Toronto. Her second film, Black Men and Me, was featured in the 2007 Inside Out Film and Video Festival and explores Clarke's perceptions of black masculinity from a black lesbian's perspective. The film has since been featured at the 2007 Reel World Film Festival (Toronto), the 2007 Miami Gay and Lesbian Film Festival and the 2007 San Francisco International LGBT Film Festival. Clarke is also an author and has been published in Bent on Writing: An Anthology of Queer Tales.

In 2013, she started a portrait series "It’s Good To Be Needed," in which she photographed ex-partners who remained friends holding hands.

In 2016, she was commissioned by The Robert McLaughlin Gallery in Oshawa, Ontario, to create a two-channel video installation called "I’m Thinking of Ending Things." The project commemorates the 150 years or Oshawa's manufacturing history through personal stories of job loss.

Clarke's video work "Suck Teeth Compositions (After Rashaad Newsome)" was included in Here We Are Here: Black Canadian Contemporary Art, an exhibition at the Royal Ontario Museum in 2018. That same year her work was included at the LagosPhoto Festival.

Clarke's 2018 exhibition in Toronto, A Welcome Weight on My Body, explored film in photographic form, focusing on creating analog still images of Caribbean Canadian friends and family, whom she found missing or exploited in the genre historically. The scrapbook-like installation of photographs hung in composition of groups on shelves, floor, in wood or metal frames complicated the presentation, in an attempt to pull them away from a minimalist, colder conceptual tradition. In this exhibition Clarke explores the cultural weight of Blackness and presents the photographs in a way that is meant to feel approachable and part of a practice as opposed masterful print and modern presentation.

In 2018 Clarke exhibited her video titled "All That Is Left Unsaid" in Los Angeles. In the video Clarke edited together all of the moments without speech from an Audre Lorde documentary.

== Publications ==
- Visitor Information Digital publication. Oshawa: The Robert McLaughlin Gallery. 2017. ISBN 978-1-926589-92-3. Archived from the original on 2021-10-25.
