= José Luis Vega =

Puerto Rican poet (born 1948)

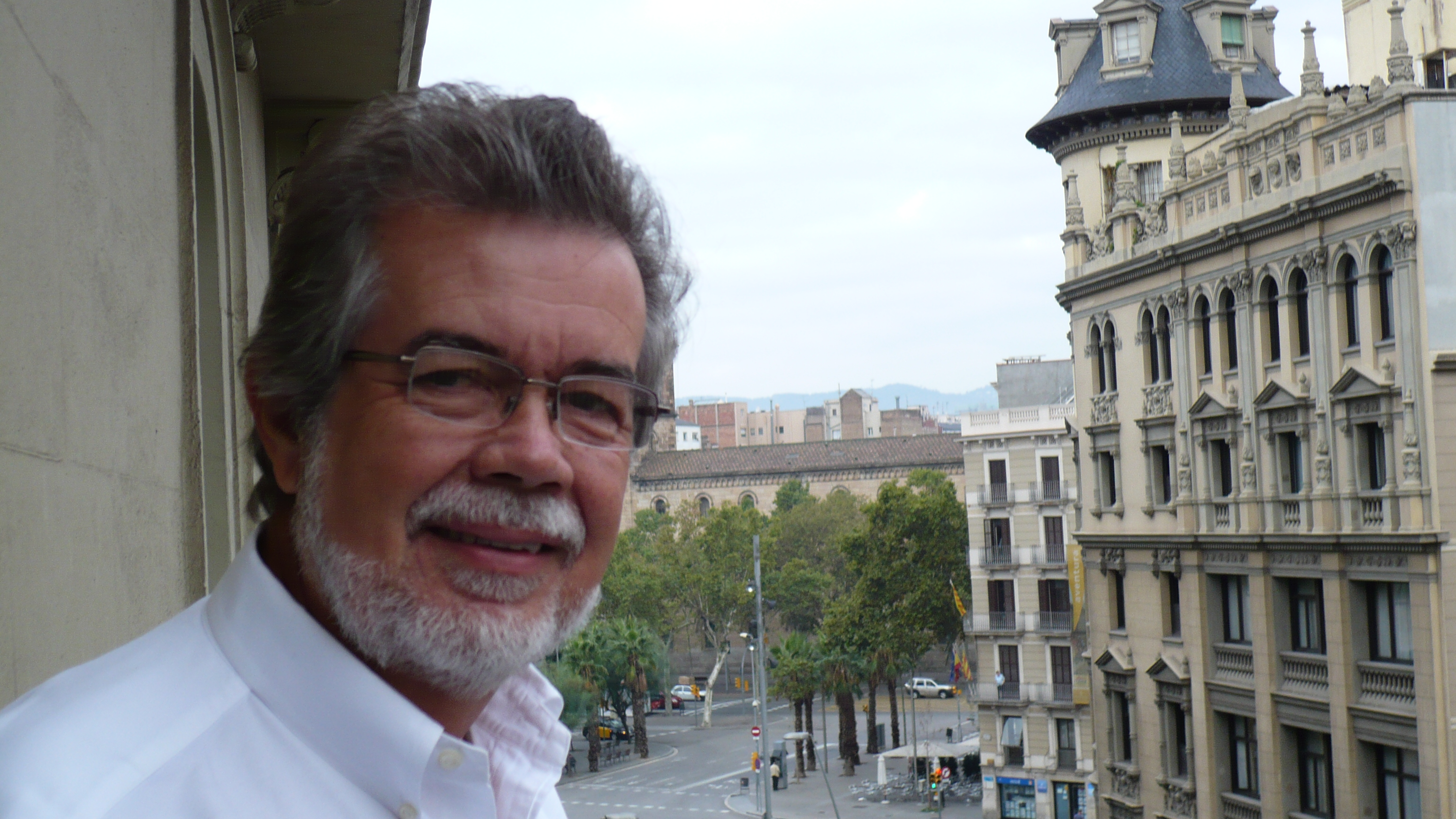
- José Luis Vega in Barcelona
- Born: 18 June 1948 (age 78); Santurce, Puerto Rico
- Occupations: Poet, essayist, academic
- Known for: Letra viva, Sínsoras, El arpa olvidada
- Awards: Order of Isabella the Catholic (Commander), Order of Gabriela Mistral (Commander), Ricardo Alegría Medal

Academic background
- Education: University of Puerto Rico

Academic work
- Discipline: Hispanic studies
- Institutions: University of Puerto Rico; Academia Puertorriqueña de la Lengua Española

José Luis Vega (born June 18, 1948) is a Puerto Rican poet, essayist, and academic. He is considered one of the leading voices in contemporary Caribbean and Hispanic poetry. His literary career spans more than five decades, with published works in poetry, literary criticism, and language education. His poetry, characterized by lyrical intensity and cultural resonance, has been translated into several languages including English, French, Portuguese, Romanian, and Russian. Vega has also served as director of the Puerto Rican Academy of the Spanish Language and has received prestigious honors such as the Order of Isabella the Catholic and the Order of Gabriela Mistral.

== Career ==
Vega was born in Santurce, Puerto Rico to José Vega Serrano and Aida Esther Colón Rivera. He studied in Santurce public schools, graduating from Central High School in Santurce in 1964. That year he entered the University of Puerto Rico, where he completed undergraduate studies in social sciences. He subsequently began studies in philosophy, then left them to pursue a specialization in Hispanic studies. He completed a master's degree in art in 1975, with a thesis on the poetry of César Vallejo. In 1982, he completed a Ph.D. with the dissertation La poesía de Oliverio Girondo: Vanguardia y tradición.

Collections of Vega's poetry include:

- Comienzo del canto (1969)
- Signos vitales (1974)
- Las natas de los párpados (1976)
- La naranja entera (1983)
- Tiempo de bolero (1985)
- Bajo los effectos de la poesía (1986)
- Solo de pasión/Teoría del sueño (1996)

In 2002, the Spanish publishing house Visor published an anthology of Vega's poetry entitled Letra viva. His book of poems, Sínsoras (2013) was published in Mexico by Seix Barral. Madrid's Estampa Gallery published Botella al mar (2013), an artist's book illustrated by Oscar Lagunas. In 2014, Vega published El arpa olvidada: Guía para la lectura de la poesía (Pre-Textos, Spain), an essay on poetry that can be considered Vega's poetic creed. In 2016, the same Valencian publisher released Música de fondo, Vega's most recent collection.

In the prologue to Letra viva, Julio Ortega considers José Luis Vega as the best poet in his country, the privileged product of the great poetic tradition that has made that island a term of the sums of Spain and America, between classical forms and worldly eloquence. The poetry of José Luis Vega has been translated into English, French, Portuguese, Romanian and Russian. He is also author of the collection of essays and poems, Techo a dos aguas (Plaza Mayor, 1998), and of several literary studies among them César Vallejo in Trilce (1983), La visión trágica en la poesía de Pablo Neruda, essay that forms part of The Commemorative Edition of the work of the Chilean poet published by the Real Academia Española (Royal Spanish Academy) and the Asociación de Academias de la Lengua Española (2010) (Association of Academies of the Spanish Language) and Coloquio de los centauros: Poética the Rubén Darío, in Rubén Darío: del símbolo a la realidad, which also is part of another Commemorative Edition of the Real Academia Española (2016).

For his cultural achievements, Vega has been distinguished with the Order of Isabel the Catholic (Grade of Commander), with the Medal of the Foundation Ricardo Alegría and with the Order to the Educational and Cultural Merit Gabriela Mistral (Grade of Commander). He is a corresponding academic of the Real Academia Española and the academies of the Spanish language of the United States, Dominican Republic and Bolivia.

José Luis Vega's poems have been included in important anthologies of poetry in Spanish, among others Los 100 grandes poemas de España y América, compiled by Julio Ortega and published by the publisher Siglo XXI. His poetry has been translated into English, French, Portuguese, Romanian and Russian. On the poetry of José Luis Vega two books have been published: Tiempo de poesía: La palabra de José Luis Vega, by María Teresa Bertelloni and La experiencia cuántica en la poesía de José Luis Vega, by Bruno Rosario Candelier.

José Luis Vega is the current director of the Academia Puertorriqueña de la Lengua Española (Puerto Rican Academy of the Spanish Language), he has been a professor at the University of Puerto Rico, director of the Department of Hispanic Studies, dean of the Faculty of Humanities and director of the Institute of Puerto Rican Culture.

== Publications ==
- Comienzo del canto, Yaurel, San Juan, 1965.
- Signos vitales, Cultural, San Juan, 1974.
- Suite erótica, Ventana, San Juan, 1976.
- Visión (separata con un poema). Ediciones Miljevik, Argentina, 1976.
- La naranja entera, Cultural, 1983.
- César Vallejo en Trilce, Universidad de Puerto Rico, 1983.
- Tiempo de bolero, Cultural, San Juan, 1985.
- Bajo los efectos de la poesía, Cultural, UPR, 1989.
- Solo de pasión/Teoría del sueño, ICP, San Juan, 1996.
- Techo a dos aguas, Plaza Mayor, San Juan 1998).
- Tres entradas para Porto Rico. Brasil: Fundação Memorial da América, 2000.
- Letra viva (antología), Visor, Madrid, 2002.
- Sínsoras, Seix Barral, México, 2013.
- Golpe de tambor (separata con un poema), Fundación SM, San Juan, 2013.
- Botella al mar (con ilustraciones de Óscar Lagunas), Estampa, Madrid, 2014.
- El arpa olvidada (Guía para la lectura de la poesía), Pre-Textos, Valencia: 2014.
- Música de fondo Pre-Textos, Madrid, Buenos Aires, Valencia, 2016.

== Other publications ==
- Reunión de espejos, (Antología del cuento puertorriqueño actual). Río Piedras, Cultural, 1983.
- Pensamiento y comunicación (Serie para la enseñanza del español en la escuela intermedia y superior, con la colaboración de María Vaquero y Humberto López Morales), Río Piedras: Plaza Mayor, 1998,
- Gramática actual del español (en colaboración con Amparo Morales). San Juan, SM, 2011
- Gramática didáctica del español (en colaboración con Amparo Morales), San Juan: SM, 2014

== See also ==
- List of Puerto Rican writers
- List of Puerto Ricans
- Puerto Rican literature
- Caribbean poetry
