= Françoise Ega =

French writer (1920–1976)

- Born: Françoise Marcelle Modock; 27 November 1920; Le Morne-Rouge, Martinique
- Died: 8 March 1976 (aged 55); Marseille, France
- Other name: Mam’Ega
- Occupations: Writer, social activist
- Years active: 1960–1976

Françoise Marcelle Ega (née Modock; 11 November 1920 – 8 March 1976) was a French laborer, writer and social activist. She was most noted in her lifetime for her community leadership and advocacy for Caribbean migrants to France. Since her death, her written works, which explore themes of alienation, exploitation, and nationalism, have been recognized as an important voice for French Antillean women in the period between the end of the Second World War and the end to colonization.

== Early life ==
Françoise Marcelle Modock was born on 27 November 1920 in Le Morne-Rouge, Martinique, to the seamstress Déhé Partel and gamekeeper, Claude Modock. Françoise Modock was raised in Martinique, finished school in French and took a secretarial course, earning a typing diploma before she moved to France during World War II. There she met and married Franz Ega 8 May 1946 in Paris. Her husband was a soldier, which led the couple to live in several African countries before they settled in Marseille, where four of her five children were born.

== Career ==
Ega was very involved in the Caribbean community in Marseille. She founded after-school programs for children and tutored children in both school studies and Catholic catechism. She was an organizer of the French West Indian-Guianese soccer team and founded two organizations the Association of Antillean and Guianese Workers (French: L’Amicale des travailleurs antillais et guyanais (AMITAG)) and the Antillo-Guianese Cultural and Sports Association (French: Association culturelle et sportive antillo-guyanaise (ACSAG)) to foster participation by migrants from the French Antilles and French Guiana in sporting and cultural events. As an educated woman, Ega also helped migrants with paperwork and transactions related to carrying out their day-to-day activities, as well as giving adult literacy lessons. Active in politics and union activities, she strongly advocated for the protection of public spaces, such as parks, swimming pools and stadiums. She worked with Séverin Montarello to create the Espace Culturel Busserine, the first neighborhood center in the area.

Ega wrote three books: two autobiographical novels, Le temps des Madras (1966) and Lettres à une noire (1979), and the novel L´alizé ne soufflait plus (2000). The first book brings the author's childhood memories in the countryside of Martinique. The second one addresses her life in the south of France when she worked as a cleaner and sought to write her first novel. The third is a novel set during World War II, evoking the effects of the conflict in Martinique. In Lettres à une noire, she explored themes that were common to many Caribbean migrants in the post-war period: exploitation, migration, racism as well as classism, and gender. In Lettres à une noire (Letters to a Black Woman), Ega addresses letters about the living conditions of working Antillean women to another black writer, the Brazilian Carolina Maria de Jesus. After reading an article about Jesus in the magazine Paris Match, Ega finds inspiration in the work of the Brazilian writer to write her diary (the letters). The book is organized as a series of journal entries (or never-posted letters) to Carolina Maria de Jesus. The correspondences between the works of both authors also establish a dialogue about the narration of the black female genealogy, intertwined with the traumas of slavery. Her works, along with a few other contemporary Caribbean writers, critique the French efforts to manage their colonies in the postwar period. Ega spoke of the stratified society, the low wages that migrants were paid, the lack of education.

== Death and legacy ==
Ega died on 8 March 1976 in Marseille. After her death, a plaque was installed to commemorate her works at the Busserine Cultural Centre and a committee, Le Comité MamEga, was established to maintain her legacy of community service. The committee has also continued to publish posthumous works. In 1978, they released Lettres à une noire; in 1992 Le pin de Magneu was published; and in 2000, the Mam'Ega Committee published L'Alizé ne soufflait plus. In 2017, the work of Ega was discovered by Brazilian researcher Maria Clara Machado during her doctoral studies in France. As a result, Lettres à une noire was translated into Brazilian Portuguese and published in Brazil by Todavia publishing house. Subsequently, the book was reedited in French by Lux publishing house and are being translated to several other languages.

The first doctoral thesis on the literary correspondences between authors Carolina Maria de Jesus and Françoise Ega was presented in 2022 at Sorbonne Nouvelle University and the University of Brasília under the title: "My weeping, your singing: Possible Correspondences between the Works of Françoise Ega and Carolina Maria de Jesus".
