= Michel Maxwell Philip =

Trinidadian novelist and lawyer (1829–1888)

Michel Maxwell Philip (12 October 1829 – 30 June 1888) was a Trinidadian novelist, lawyer, and civil servant.

== Biography ==
Philip was born at the Cooper Grange Estate, South Naparima, in Trinidad. He was "apparently" the illegitimate son of a white planter and mixed-race woman from the Philip family.

After graduating from the small school at San Fernando, he went on at the age of 14 to St Mary's Catholic College in Scotland, where he received a classical education. After returning to Trinidad in 1849, he studied law for two years, then returned to England. In 1854, he was called to the bar. In the same year, he published his novel Emmanuel Appadocca, or, Blighted Life: A Tale of the Boucaneers, which is the first Trinidadian novel. Emmanuel Appadocca is about the illegitimate son of a rich father who owns his enslaved African mother. The protagonist avenges himself and his mother by showing that he is more ethical and more intelligent than his affluent father. C. L. R. James wrote in a 1931 article in The Beacon magazine that Philip was "the most brilliant native of his time and within memory" and that his book "shows the powerful effect with which the misfortune of his birth weighed upon his mind".

A. H. Gordon (governor from 1866 to 1870) appointed Philip as an acting Unofficial member of the Legislative Council. Gordon later appointed Philip as the acting Solicitor-General. In 1871, Philip became the Solicitor-General and stayed at the post until his death in 1888.

In 1867, following an election, Philip became the Mayor of Port of Spain, a position that had previously been held by only whites. Bridget Brereton wrote in her 2002 book Race Relations in Colonial Trinidad 1870–1900 that "perhaps this marks the emergence of the coloured man as a political force in Trinidad".

== Death and legacy ==
Philip's health began to weaken in 1887. He died at Maraval. 29 November was designated Maxwell Philip Day by the Port of Spain City Corporation. The day was first celebrated in 1999 at the Auditorium, Port of Spain City Hall, with the introduction of an anthology of essays about Philip that was edited by Selwyn Cudjoe.
