= Kris Rampersad =

Trinidad and Tobago journalist

- Born: Trinidad
- Education: University of the West Indies
- Occupations: writer, researcher, lecturer, journalist, publisher, activist and advocate
- Awards: Press Award; National Medal (Gold) for Distinguished Contributions to the Development of Women/Journalism

Kris Rampersad is a writer, researcher, lecturer, journalist, publisher, activist and advocate from Trinidad and Tobago.

== Biography ==
Rampersad was born in rural Trinidad. She started her career as a freelance journalist at the San Fernando office of the Trinidad Guardian, before being called three months later to join the staff of the Port of Spain headquarters, where she has worked in various capacities as reporter of health, education, culture and politics.

She has written Guardian columns such as "Discover Trinidad and Tobago", "Teenlife", "Environment Friendly", "In Gabilan", "I Beg to Move", "The Week That Was", and "The C Monologues", as Literarily.

She served as editor of its U Magazine and Sunday Guardian. She covered most of the Jamaat al Muslimeen coup attempt involving activities at Trinidad and Tobago Television for the Guardian during July 1990. She was one of the founding journalists at Newsday.

=== Education ===
Rampersad was the first sitting journalist/editor in the Caribbean to hold a PhD. She completed her PhD at the University of the West Indies following a bachelor's degree in which she earned first-class honours.

=== Awards and fellowships ===
Rampersad holds awards in Journalism (BWIA Media Awards for Excellence in Journalism - Social and Economic Commentary and Pan American Health Journalism Award for Excellence in Health Reporting.

She received a Nuffield Foundation Press Award at Wolfson College, Cambridge University, the Foreign Press Centre of Japan Fellowship and a Government of India ITEC Scholarship to the Indian Institute of Mass Communication where she received its highest, the Rajasthan Patrika Award. She also received a Commonwealth Professional Fellowship and is considered a Commonwealth Gender Scholar.

In 2018, Rampersad won the National Medal (Gold) for Distinguished Contributions to the Development of Women/Journalism.

=== Educator ===
Rampersad is a pioneer and specialist scholar and educator about the intersection of education, media and culture in the world of new media. She has worked on media strategies for the Commonwealth Foundation and the Caribbean Institute of Agricultural Research and Development, and pioneered the Excellence in Agricultural Journalism Award of 2010. She has prepared, presented and published numerous papers on media, culture and gender including at Caribbean Cultural Diversity to UNESCO, Commonwealth Diversity Conferences, and Arcade/Acted.

Rampersad facilitated the training of multisectoral communities in Belize, Jamaica, Grenada and elsewhere in Intangible Cultural Heritage and community capacity development and preparation of dossiers for UNESCO World Heritage.

Rampersad was President of the UNESCO Education Commission, Vice President of the Subsidiary Body of the UNESCO Intergovernmental Committee on Intangible Cultural Heritage, and Vice President of the Commonwealth Journalist Association.

She founded, with Nobel laureate Derek Walcott, the Trinidad Theatre Workshop Fund for Literature, Drama and Film.

== Bibliography ==
- 2002 - Finding A Place: IndoTrinidadian Literature (Kingston, Jamaica: Ian Randle Publishers)ISBN 978-9766370787
- 2012 - Through the Political Glass Ceiling - Race to Prime Ministership by Trinidad and Tobago's First Female.ISBN 978-9768228000
- 2019 - I the Sky & Me the Sea, The Adventures of Munnie Butterfly & Danny Dragonfly, Book 1. ASIN B07XB8ZYB9
- 2020 - LiTTscapes - Landscapes of Fiction. ASIN B08839XLTL

== See also ==
- Non-resident Indian and Person of Indian Origin
- Indo-Trinidadian and Tobagonian
