= Wayne Brown (author) =

Wayne Vincent Brown (born 18 July 1944 in Port of Spain, Trinidad and Tobago; died 15 September 2009 in Stony Hill, Jamaica) was a columnist, poet and fiction writer, and a teacher and mentor to numerous Caribbean writers.

== Early life ==
Wayne Brown was born in Port of Spain, Trinidad, to parents, Kenneth Vincent Brown, and Vere Vincent Brown (née Edghill). His grandfather was Vincent Brown, the Attorney-General of Trinidad and Tobago. His mother died soon after giving birth to him, and for most of his childhood Wayne was brought up by relatives, while his father worked as a puisne judge.

== Academic life ==
Brown had been a Fulbright Scholar in the United States, Gregory Fellow in Poetry at the University of Leeds from 1974 to 1977 and a Fellow of Yaddo, MacDowell and the Virginia Center for the Creative Arts. He also attended the International Writing Program at the University of Iowa and is the founder of the Observer Creative Writing Workshop. He was also an instructor at Lesley University's MFA in Creative Writing Program.

== Writing ==
He was the author of On The Coast, for which he was awarded the Commonwealth Poetry Prize in 1973. His works also include Landscape with Heron (2000), Edna Manley: The Private Years (1976), Voyages (1989) and The Child of the Sea (1990). He also edited Selected Poetry and Bearing Witness: The Best of the Observer Arts Magazine 2000.

Brown lived in Jamaica, adopting it as his home in 1997. In 1998, he founded the Observer Literary Arts magazine that spawned a new generation of Caribbean writers.

Brown wrote a weekly column for The Jamaica Observer entitled "In Our Time". The column also appeared in Trinidad at the Trinidad and Tobago Express, as well as in the Guyanese press. His final writing engagement had been a weekly column, "In the Obama Era", for the Express, the Barbados Daily Nation and Guyana's Stabroek News.

One of Brown's most memorable poems, "Noah," retells the Genesis story in symbolic terms. The ark filled with animals is "his mind's ark"; the ship and its occupants "[b]eat and beat across the same sea / Bloated, adrift, finding / Nothing to fasten to." And by poem's end "Noah, released,/ Turned once more outwards, giving thanks. / Relief dazed them: nobody realized / Nothing had changed." Peace with God appears illusory; perhaps the ark of the mind cannot be remade, nor the world cleansed.

== Archives ==
The University of Leeds Special Collections holds The Wayne Brown Archive, featuring six boxes of manuscript, typescript, photographs, postcards, press cuttings, greeting cards, scrapbooks and printed material.

The Wayne Brown Collection can be found in the Special Collections at the University of the West Indies Mona campus. The Wayne Brown collection consists of novels, plays and short stories. It includes works by Caribbean writers as well as several international writers.

== Bibliography ==
- On the Coast and other poems (1973, Commonwealth Prize for Poetry; Peepal Tree Press, 2010)
- Edna Manley: The Private Years (Andre Deutsch, 1976)
- Voyages (Imprint Caribbean, 1989)
- The Child of the Sea (Imprint Caribbean, 1990)
- Landscape with Heron (2000)
- The Scent of the Past and other stories (Peepal Tree Press, 2011)
