= Kevin Baldeosingh =

Trinidad and Tobago writer

Kevin Baldeosingh (born 1963) is a Trinidadian newspaper columnist, author and Humanist, who has been involved in many controversial social issues, especially in respect to religious issues. He has worked with the Trinidad Express, Newsday and the Trinidad Guardian. In July 2017, after 25 years in the field, he ceased working as a journalist when his contract was not renewed by the Trinidad Guardian and he was not hired by any other media company.

== Writing ==
In twenty years as a professional writer he has written more than 2,000 newspaper articles, over 30 periodical articles and papers, 20-plus short stories, and three novels. In 2007, his one-act play, The Comedian, was one of the four winning plays in the National Drama Association playwriting contest. He was also one of 15 prize-winning finalists in a 2007 international essay competition, organized by US-based "TRACE International" (a non-profit organization that develops and promotes anti-bribery programs), on official corruption and how to prevent it.

Kevin has also co-authored a Caribbean history text for secondary school students, written books on media practice, parenting, as well as a collection of policy essays. He has also written the only modern history of Trinidad, which gives a social and economic picture of the island from 1901 to 2001. His articles have been published in the US and UK on Areo, FEE, Spiked, CapX, Mises Wire, and The Washington Examiner.

== Other work ==
He was a co-founder and chairman of the Trinidad and Tobago Humanist Association, the only organization of its kind in the Anglophone Caribbean. He was also vice-chair for ASPIRE (Advocates for Safe Parenthood: Improving Reproductive Equity), a lobby group seeking clarification and updating of Trinidad and Tobago's laws on abortion, with the aim of reducing the health risks and maternal mortality associated with unsafe illegal abortions. He was regional chairperson for the Commonwealth Writers Prize (Canada/Caribbean) for 2000 and 2001.

== Novels ==
- The Autobiography of Paras P (1996), Heinemann Caribbean Writers Series. ISBN 0-435-98818-2
- Virgin's Triangle (1997), Heinemann. ISBN 0-435-98947-2
- The Ten Incarnations of Adam Avatar (2004), Peepal Tree Press ISBN 1-84523-000-0

== Non-fiction ==
- Caribbean History for CSEC, 2011 (with Dr Radica Mahase)
- A Trini Political Dictionary (2017)
- Child Proof 0-3 (2018)
- Fix 25 (2018)
- Maccos (2019)
- Mocking gods (2019)
- From Colony to Curse (2020)
