= Roi Kwabena =

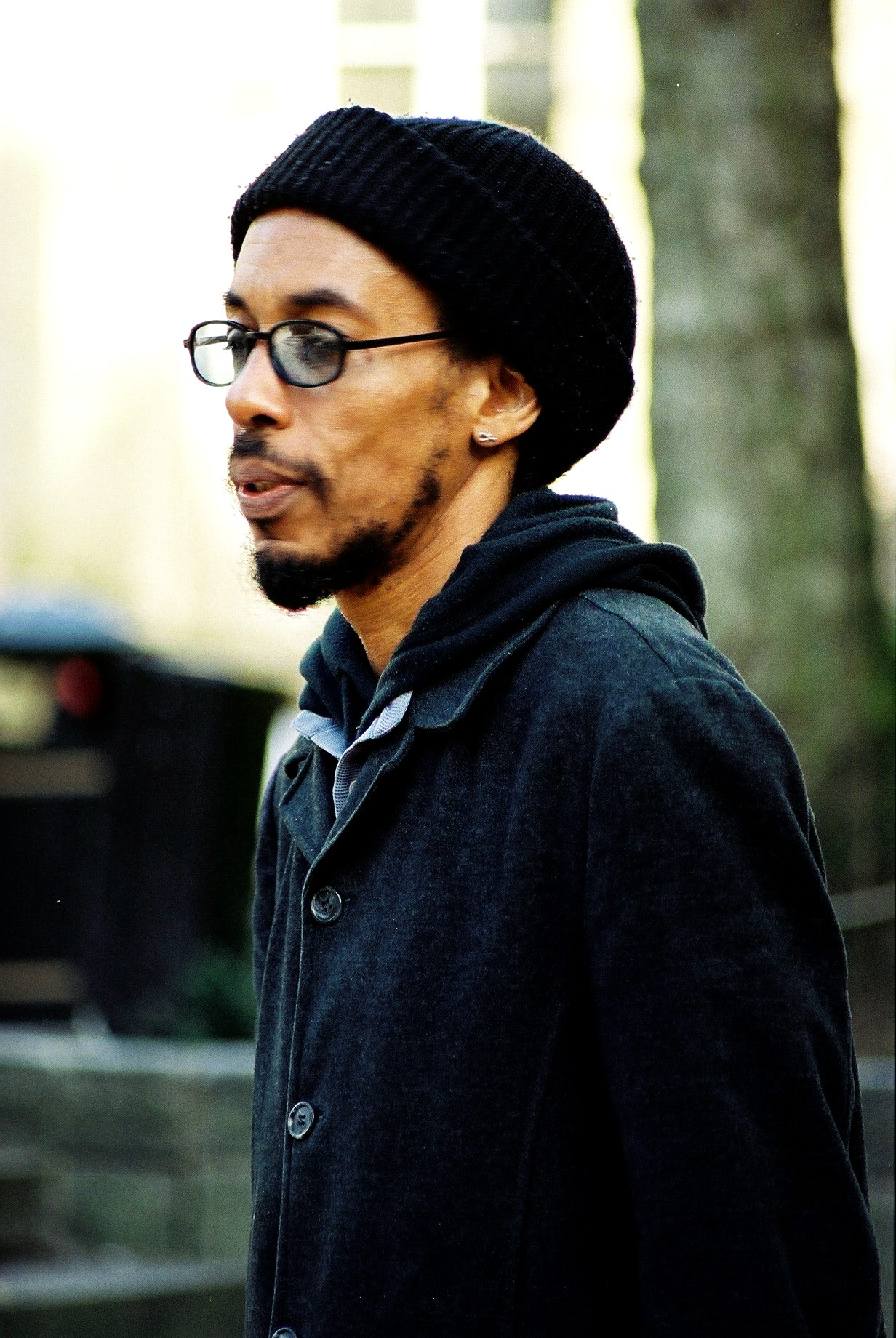

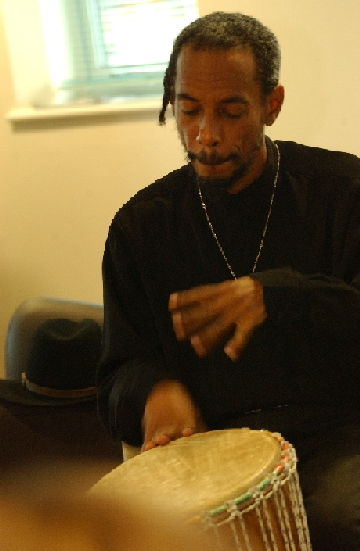
Roi Ankhkara Kwabena

Dr. Roi Ankhkara Kwabena (born: Fitzroy Cook Jr. 23 July 1956 – 9 January 2008) was a Trinidadian cultural anthropologist, who worked with all age ranges in Europe, Africa, Latin-America and the Caribbean for over 30 years. He died in England, where he had relocated.

== Life and career ==
Kwabena was born in Port of Spain, Trinidad, where he was educated. At the age of 14, he published his first poem, "Why Black Power", which he also performed at a Black Power rally. His first collection, Lament of the Soul, appeared three years later, and marked the beginning of a prolific body of work over the following three decades, including other poetry collections, journals, essays, children's stories and the thesis Marijuana (1981). At the same time, he founded the publishing co-operative Afroets Press, and Bembe Productions, a cultural collective whose objective was the propagation of creative expression from the Caribbean and its diaspora.

In commemoration of UN's International Literacy Year 1990 he was "Writer In Residence" at Trinidad's Public Library. In the mid-1990s he served as a Senator in the Parliament of Trinidad and Tobago. He then made Birmingham, England, his permanent base and was appointed its sixth Poet Laureate for 2001–02. As a cultural ambassador he hosted numerous readings by writers and actively promoted literature development internationally as well as himself lecturing and performing at many schools, universities, cultural and social venues.

Dr Kwabena was renowned for using critical analysis to examine the historical roots of racism and to assess the direct relevance this has on present society. He also championed wide-ranging issues such as functional and cultural literacy, therapeutic harvesting of memories by elders and young people (including cross generational dialogue), Community Cohesion, Social Inclusion, Cultural Diversity, redefining the heritages of indigenous peoples, plus confidence building for convicted prisoners, excluded and traumatized students, refugees, etc.

In 2007, Roi Kwabena was included among activists, artists, campaigners, sport and media personalities on a wall celebrating efforts of The World's Black Achievers: Past and Present at the Liverpool-based International Slavery Museum.

Kwabena died on 9 January 2008, one day after being diagnosed with lung cancer at a hospital in London - prior to this, doctors had been treating him for pneumonia. His funeral took place in London on 26 January 2008 and he was cremated two days later. His ashes were flown to Trinidad.

== Bibliography ==
- Lament of the Soul (poetry), 1974
- Insight (poetry/essay), 1975
- Follow de Path (poetry), 1980
- Marijuana (thesis), 1981
- Vegetable & Fruit Juices (health), 1982
- C.U.R.E. 84 (health journal), 1983
- C.U.R.E. 85 (ibid), 1985
- In other words (poetry) 1986
- Black Molasses /Brown Sugar (journal), 1986
- Seasons of Exile (poetry), 1986
- About the Caribbean (socio-geography), 1986
- Sojourn: towards victory (travel journal and history), 1988
- Profile 96 (journal of culture), 1994
- Manifestations: selected poems 1985-95 (poetry), 1997
- Destiny (journal black history), 1997
- Kush Reclaimed (poetry/ history), 1987/1997–1998
- Nubian Saints of Christianity (history), 1997–1998
- Nubian Glory: our heritage (anthropology/history), 1999
- A Job for the Hangman (poetry), 1999
- Never Trouble, Trouble (children stories), 1999
- Ancient Inscriptions & Sacred Texts of Ethiopia (anthropology), 2000
- Whether or Not (poetry/history; Raka Publications), 2001
- As Long As (poetry), 2005
- Muse of Maps, Muurs, Mounds & Mysteries (essay), 2006
- DIALOGUE (journal for Cultural Literacy), 2006–2007
- Orisha Songs for Celina (poetry), 2006
- In the Moment (Poetry), 2006
- Making of TA-MERI-KA: Black Women in Time (Anthropology), 2006

== Discography ==
- Y42K – Spoken Word CD- 2000–2006 (blueplanetsound, UK & Bembe Productions)
