= Cynthia James =

Trinidadian Canadian writer and literary theorist (born 1948)

- Born: 1948 (age 77–78); Sangre Grande, Trinidad and Tobago
- Education: University of the West Indies at St. Augustine; Howard University
- Occupations: Writer and literary theorist

Cynthia James (born 1948) is a Trinidadian Canadian writer and literary theorist.

== Early life and education ==
Cynthia James was born in Sangre Grande, Trinidad and Tobago, in 1948. She was raised in Salybia, a village on the coast, and her parents were both teachers.

James attended St. George's College in Barataria, and then in 1969 she obtained a bachelor's degree in French, Spanish, and English from the University of the West Indies at St. Augustine. She later graduated with a master of art degree from the university.

In the 1990s, James went to the United States to study at Howard University in Washington, D.C., where she graduated with a Ph.D. in English in 1998. She lectured at Howard before returning to Trinidad.

== Career ==
James continued her academic career at the University of the West Indies at St. Augustine, lecturing on language education and other subjects. She also served on the university's advisory board and published extensively in academic journals. Her first book of literary criticism, The Maroon Narrative, was published in 2002; it focuses on Caribbean literature in English.

She also worked for many years as a public school teacher in Trinidad.

=== Writing ===
James had early success as a playwright, winning the country's first play-writing competition in 1979 with the work No Resolution.

She published her first book, the short-story collection Soothe Me Music, in 1990. This was followed by three poetry collections in the '90s: Iere, My Love; Vigil; and La Vega and other poems.

In 2000, James published her first novel, Bluejean, followed by the novel Sapodilla Terrace in 2006.

Her work has been included in a number of anthologies, including the Oxford Book of Caribbean Verse and Sisters of Caliban: Contemporary Women Writers of the Caribbean.

Her collection, Watermarked, was released in 2014.

== Awards and honours ==
In 2013, she was awarded the Caribbean Writer's Canute A. Brodhurst Prize for Fiction.

== Personal life ==
James currently lives in Toronto, Canada, where she moved in the late 2000s.

== Selected works ==
=== Short stories ===
- Soothe Me Music (1990)

=== Poetry ===
- Iere, My Love (1990)
- Vigil: A Long Poem (1995)
- La Vega and Other Poems (1995)
- Watermarked (2014)

=== Novels ===
- Bluejean (2000)
- Sapodilla Terrace (2006)
- I Dreamt You Planting Corn and Marigolds (2023)

=== Literary criticism ===
- The Maroon Narrative (2002)
