= Elizabeth Walcott-Hackshaw =

Trinidadian writer and academic (born 1964)

- Born: 1964 (age 61–62); Trinidad
- Education: Boston University (PhD)
- Occupations: Writer and academic
- Employer: University of the West Indies
- Father: Derek Walcott

Elizabeth Walcott-Hackshaw (born 1964) is a Trinidadian writer and academic who is a professor of French literature and creative writing at the University of the West Indies (UWI). Her writing encompasses both scholarly and creative work, and she has also co-edited several books. Walcott-Hackshaw is the daughter of Nobel Prize laureate Derek Walcott.

== Biography ==
Born in Trinidad in 1964, Walcott-Hackshaw studied in the United States, returning to Trinidad in 1992. She holds a bachelor's degree in English and French Literature from Boston University, and after completing her PhD in 1995, she went on to join the Faculty of Humanities and Education at the University of the West Indies (UWI), St Augustine Campus, in 1999. In 2021, she was appointed Public Orator at UWI St. Augustine, a three-year post.

She has co-edited several books and has written scholarly essays and articles particularly on Francophone Caribbean literature. Her first collection of short stories, Four Taxis Facing North, was published in 2007, later being translated into Italian. The Caribbean Review of Books noted of Walcott-Hackshaw's stories: "...the fact that she presents characters who are at once insiders and outsiders makes for a complex and interesting portrait of class and race in contemporary Trinidadian society." Her first novel, Mrs. B, was published in 2014, when it was shortlisted for the “Best Book Fiction” in the Guyana Prize for Caribbean Literature. Arnold Rampersad described the book as "richly entertaining", and said: "Walcott-Hackshaw offers a vigorous, at times sizzling, prose that is grounded in local rhythms and allusions to the culture that is at once both the object of her love and also her main target."

She has published book reviews and creative writing in such journals as The Caribbean Review of Books and Small Axe, and her short stories have been widely translated as well as anthologized, including in Trinidad Noir: The Classics, edited by Earl Lovelace and Robert Antoni (2017), and New Daughters of Africa, edited by Margaret Busby (2019).

== Selected publications ==
=== Fiction ===
- Four Taxis Facing North (short stories), Peepal Tree Press, 2007, ISBN 9781845233471.
- Mrs. B (novel), Peepal Tree Press, 2014, ISBN 9781845232313.
- Stick No Bills (short stories), Peepal Tree Press, 2020, ISBN 9781845234676.

=== Biography ===
- Aimé Césaire, University of the West Indies Press, 2021, ISBN 9789766408305

=== As editor ===
- (With Martin Munro) Reinterpreting the Haitian Revolution and Its Cultural Aftershocks, University of the West Indies Press, 2006.
- (With Martin Munro) Echoes of the Haitian Revolution 1804–2004, University of the West Indies Press, 2009.
- (With Nicole Roberts) Border Crossings: A Trilingual Anthology of Caribbean Women Writers, University of the West Indies Press, 2012.
- (With Barbara Lalla, Nicole Roberts and Valerie Youssef) Methods in Caribbean Research: Literature, Discourse, Culture, University of the West Indies Press, 2013.
