= Amryl Johnson =

Trinidad poet (1944–2001)

- Born: 6 April 1944; Tunapuna, Trinidad
- Died: 1 February 2001 (aged 56)
- Education: University of Kent
- Occupation: Poet

Amryl Johnson (6 April 1944 – 1 February 2001) was a writer born in Trinidad who lived most of her life in Britain.

== Life ==
Johnson was born in Tunapuna, Trinidad, and was brought up by her grandparents until the age of 11, when she moved to Britain to join her parents. She attended secondary school in London and went on to study British, African and Caribbean literature at the University of Kent. Much of her work concerned the diasporic nature of her life and the hostility she faced in Britain.

For a time, Johnson taught at the University of Warwick but generally supported herself by writing and performing. During the late 1980s, she settled in Coventry.

Sequins for a Ragged Hem (1988) narrates Johnson's second return tour to Trinidad as a spiritual "homecoming" made problematic, among other reasons, by the fact that the house where she was born had been demolished.

Johnson's work was included in several anthologies, including News for Babylon: The Chatto Book of Westindian-British Poetry (1984), Let It Be Told: Essays by Black Women in Britain (1987), Watchers & Seekers: Creative Writing by Black Women in Britain (1987), The New British Poetry (1988), Delighting the Heart (1989), Creation Fire: A CAFRA Anthology of Caribbean Women's Poetry (1990), Taking Reality by Surprise (1991), Daughters of Africa (1992) and OTHER: British and Irish Poetry since 1970 (1999).

== Selected works ==
- Shackles, poetry (1983)
- Long Road to Nowhere, poetry (Virago, 1985)
- Sequins for a Ragged Hem, travel writing (Virago, 1988)
- Blood and Wine, audio recording (Cofa Press, 1991)
- Gorgons, poetry (Cofa Press, 1992)
- Tread Softly in Paradise (Cofa Press)
- Calling, poetry (2000)
