= Dionyse McTair =

Trinidad and Tobago poet (born 1950)

Dionyse McTair (born 1950) is a writer in Trinidad and Tobago.

She was born in Port of Spain and received a sociology degree from the University of the West Indies. McTair has taught sociology in a secondary school in Trinidad. She is an instructor in the Department of Modern Languages and Linguistics at the University of the West Indies.

Her first collection of poetry Notes Toward an Escape from Death was published in 1987. Her work has appeared in various publications including Caribbean Quarterly, Savacou and Callaloo. For McTair, the sound of her words is as important as their meaning; she believes that her poems represent a search "for personhood, of being in the world, on the planet, not just being in a black body or a woman's body".
