= Jennifer Rahim =

Trinidadian writer and scholar (1963–2023)

- Born: 1963; Trinidad and Tobago
- Died: 13 March 2023 (aged 60)
- Notable work: Approaching Sabbaths (2009); Curfew Chronicles (2017)

Jennifer Rahim (1963 – 13 March 2023) was a Trinidadian fiction writer, poet and literary critic.

== Career ==
Rahim held a BA (1987) and PhD (1993) in literatures in English and an MA in theology (2016), and having joined the University of the West Indies, St Augustine, in 1997 as a lecturer in the Department of Liberal Arts, she went on to teach a range of courses at both undergraduate and postgraduate levels, including creative writing, literary criticism and feminist theory.

Her 2009 poetry collection Approaching Sabbaths received a Casa de las Américas Prize in 2010, for best book in the category Caribbean Literature in English or Creole. She wrote articles on Caribbean literature for MaComère, The Journal of West Indian Literature, Small Axe, Anthurium, The Trinidad and Tobago Review and The Woman, the Writer and Caribbean Society (1998), edited by Helen Pyne-Timothy.

She co-edited with Barbara Lalla the collection of essays Beyond Borders: Cross Culturalism and the Caribbean Canon.

Rahim won the fiction category and the overall 2018 OCM Bocas Prize for Caribbean Literature, awarded at the NGC Bocas Lit Fest, for her 2017 book Curfew Chronicles. Lorna Goodison, who headed the panel of judges, said: "This must surely rank as one of the most ambitious books ever attempted by a Caribbean writer. The philosophical, moral and religious themes and ideas put forward about community in all its many manifestations are lightly, deftly handled... Readers are rewarded by moments of sheer grace; and numinous revelations at every turn."

Rahim died on 13 March 2023, at the age of 60.

== Selected bibliography ==
- Mothers Are Not the Only Linguists, poetry (1992)
- Between the Fence and the Forest, poetry (2002), ISBN 9781900715270
- Songster and Other Stories, short stories (2007), ISBN 9781845230487
- Approaching Sabbaths, poetry (2009), ISBN 9781845231156
- Ground Level, poetry (2014), ISBN 9781845232054
- Curfew Chronicles (2017), ISBN 9781845233624

== Selected awards ==
- 1992: Writers Union of Trinidad and Tobago Writer of the Year Award for Mothers Are Not The Only Linguists
- 1993: New Voices Award of Merit for outstanding contributions to New Voices journal
- 1996: Gulf Insurance Writers Scholarship to attend the Caribbean Writers Summer Institute, University of Miami
- 2010: Casa de las Américas Prize for Approaching Sabbaths
- 2018: OCM Bocas Prize for Caribbean Literature for Curfew Chronicles.

== See also ==
- Caribbean literature
- Caribbean poetry
