= Harold Sonny Ladoo =

Caribbean novelist (1945–1973)

- Born: 4 February 1945; Trinidad and Tobago
- Died: 17 August 1973 (aged 28); Trinidad and Tobago
- Education: University of Toronto (BA)
- Occupation: Novelist
- Notable work: No Pain Like This Body (1972) Yesterdays (1974)
- Height: 1.85 m (6 ft 1 in)

Harold Sonny Ladoo (4 February 1945 – 17 August 1973) was a Caribbean novelist, who was the author of two books documenting the struggles of living in poverty in the Hindu communities of Trinidad and Tobago. He moved to Canada in 1968 and was mysteriously murdered while on a visit to Trinidad in 1973.

== Biography ==
Ladoo was born and grew up in an environment much like the world of his novels. He was born in Trinidad into extreme poverty, and immigrated to Toronto, Ontario, Canada, with his wife and son in 1968 to study English at Erindale College of the University of Toronto. He graduated with a Bachelor of Arts in 1973.

It was during his time in university that he wrote his first and most notable novel, No Pain Like This Body, published in 1972. Described by David Chariandy and "an unusually strong first novel", it is the vivid story of a young boy growing up in a small Caribbean rice-growing community. The book focuses on the day-to-day struggles of a single family through illness, storm, and violence during the August rainy season. The writing is raw and often naïve yet manages to create a visceral experience.

His second book, Yesterdays (posthumously published, 1974), was a much more upbeat book about a young man attempting to launch a Hindu Mission to Canada.

Ladoo's third book was intended to be the last part of a trilogy; however, in 1973, while on a visit home to his Calcutta Settlement, he was mysteriously killed and his body was found on the side of a road in Trinidad.

== Bibliography ==
- No Pain Like This Body (1972), House of Anansi, 2013, with an introduction by Monique Roffey, London : Vintage Classics, 2022, ISBN 978-1-78487-702-6
- Yesterdays (posthumously published, 1974); foreword by Kevin Jared Hosein, Toronto : Coach House Books, 2024, ISBN 978-1-55245-478-7

== Legacy ==
Michael Bucknor and Conrad James described Ladoo's work as being, along with the works of Andrew Salkey, "especially useful" for tracking developments in Caribbean social attitudes towards masculinity and issues of male sexuality during the mid- to late-20th century, a domain that had been neglected by Western scholars until recently.

An essay on Indo-Caribbean authors contrasted Ladoo's work with that of Sasenarine Persaud, neither of them ever having had direct experiences with India; Persaud integrated spiritual and aesthetic elements of Indian high culture into his writing, while Ladoo's writing of his colonial environment featured "naturalistic detail, black humour, and the grotesque". Scholar Victor Ramraj described Ladoo as being unique from fellow Indo-Caribbean writers Neil Bissoondath, Rabindranath Maharaj, Ismith Khan, V. S. Naipaul, and Samuel Selvon: Ladoo's use of Creole dialect is a departure from older Caribbean fiction.

Naipaul, Jean Rhys, George Lamming, Derek Walcott, and others, used the polished language of the coloniser and showed in doing so that they were equal to the British writers who made a name for themselves. Ladoo, on the other hand, shows his confidence by selecting Creole, as if to say, "This is the dialect of the common man, why should I try to gentrify it?" In doing so, he achieves an authenticity that is furthered by the immersion of his characters in the kind of vocabulary and sentence structure that the poverty-stricken people would use. In addition, his use of onomatopoeia heightens the effect of the sounds of movement in people and nature, and increases the animism that makes the characters even more authentic. Indigenous people all over the world have believed in the almost god-like power of nature. Ladoo amplifies this distinctive belief in the intentionality given to thunder or lightning or reptiles.

To come to Sonny Ladoo from Persaud and his fellow Indo-Trinidadian novelists... is to be made aware quickly of how distinct he is from these writers – that he is unique in his depiction of a specific rural pocket of Trinidad's East Indian population in the early part of the twentieth century... Ladoo constructs a harsh, natural, and human environment of wrenching poverty, peopled by individuals given to violent and abusive domestic and communal relationships. They are perhaps the most appallingly brutal, vulgar, and obscene characters in all of West Indian literature.

The University of Toronto Mississauga campus (formerly Erindale College) offers to students The Harold Sonny Ladoo Book Prize for Creative Writing every year.
