= Nicole Craig =

- Born: 14 January 1974 Port of Spain, Trinidad and Tobago
- Occupation: Poet, short story writer, editor, copy writer, artist, curator

Nicole Craig (born 14 January 1974) is a poet, short-story writer, editor, copy writer, artist and curator from Trinidad and Tobago.

== Early life and education ==
She was born in Trinidad and Tobago, to Lorna Craig and Clyde Telesford and is the youngest sister of Cleveland Telesford and Osborne Craig. She attended Nelson Street Girls' RC School, Success/Laventille Composite School, Barataria Secondary Comprehensive School and the University of the West Indies, St. Augustine, where she received a Bachelor of Arts degree in History.

== Career ==
Craig has spent over 11 years in the advertising industry in Trinidad and Tobago. She has worked for companies such as McCann Erickson, Lonsdale Saatchi and Saatchi and its group of companies.

She has had several successful art exhibitions. Her style gained her a spot on the Absolut Vodka, Absolut Connections art tour.

Craig was the first performer at One Voice @ Vino and is the current curator for its art program. Currently, she is also a freelance copy writer, professional artist, freelance curator, and entrepreneur.

== Awards ==
During her career in advertising she has won the following awards:

- Advertising Agency Association of Trinidad & Tobago (AAATT) Award for Best print campaign Health and Personal Care Products Tisane De Dubon.
- AAATT Award for Best Print retail – Open Telecom "Freedom"
- Silver Addy Award for Retail services Print – Open Telecom "Freedom"
- AAATT Award for Health and personal care products Best Print Campaign – Redoxon "Carnival Organized"
- AAATT Award for foods Best Print – Kiss "Hungry Cake"
- AATT Award for Public Service Print – Coalition Against Domestic Violence "Pledge" Campaign
- AAATT Award for Automotive Services Print – Nissan X-trail "Mountain Climber"
- SilverAddy Award for Non alcoholic beverages Print Fanta "Escalator" TVC
- Silver Addy Awardsfor Non alcoholic beverages "True Ting" TVC.
- AATT Award for Public Service radio CSME radio jingle.
- AAATT Award for Best health and personal care radio Pepto Bismol "Think Pink" radio ad.
- AATT Award for Non-alcoholic beverages Santa Blue TVC
- Gold Addy Award for Non-alcoholic beverages Pepsi "Tie" Cricket Teaser TVC.

== Sources ==
- Anne Hilton, "Fine Art Medley", Trinidad and Tobago Newsday, 28 July 2008
- Joan Rampersad, "Craig celebrates beauty", Trinidad and Tobago Newsday, 1 March 2008
- theplanet.com
