= Errol Hill =

Trinidadian playwright, historian (1921–2003)

- Born: Errol Gaston Hill; 5 August 1921; Port of Spain, Trinidad
- Died: 15 September 2003 (aged 82)
- Education: Royal Academy of Dramatic Arts
- Occupations: Playwright, actor and theatre historian

Errol Gaston Hill (5 August 1921 – 15 September 2003) was a Trinidadian-born playwright, actor and theatre historian, "one of the leading pioneers in the West Indies theatre". Beginning as early as the 1940s, he was the leading voice for the development of a national theatre in the West Indies. He was the first tenured faculty member of African descent at Dartmouth College in the United States, joining the drama department there in 1968.

== Career ==
Errol Gaston Hill was born in Port of Spain, Trinidad, on 5 August 1921. to Thomas David Hill and Lydia (née Gibson) Hill. He studied in London, England, at the Royal Academy of Dramatic Arts, where he graduated in 1951, and went on to join Dartmouth College, becoming the first tenured faculty member of African descent there.

Hill was an actor and announcer with the British Broadcasting Corporation in London, and subsequently went to teach at the University of West Indies, in Kingston, Jamaica, and Port-of-Spain, Trinidad, as creative arts tutor (1953–58 and 1962–65). Between 1958 and 1966, he was also working as a playwright. He was a teaching fellow at the University of Ibadan, Ibadan, Nigeria (1965–67), and then an associate professor of drama at Richmond College of the City University of New York, 1967–68. He was a professor at Dartmouth College in Hanover, New Hampshire, from 1968 to 1989, when he became emeritus professor. He was also a visiting professor at other American universities, as well as at Leeds University.

After 1972, Hill devoted himself to scholarship and writing. His early work focused on creating a body of plays uniquely suited for audiences and actors in the West Indies. His later published work brought to light the many accomplishments and trials of black stage actors.

Hill's works include the play Man Better Man (1964) and the non-fiction books The Trinidad Carnival (1972), The Theater of Black Americans (1980), and the Cambridge Guide to African and Caribbean Theatre (1994). He also wrote some poetry, published in anthologies and regional literary journals.

== Selected bibliography ==
- The Ping-Pong and Broken Melody (1958). UWI Extra-Mural Department, Mona.
- Man Better Man in J. Gassner (ed.), The Yale School of Drama Presents (1954), New York: Dutton.
- Wey-Wey: Strictly Matrimony: The Square Peg (1966). UWI Extra-Mural Department, St Augustine.
- Trinidad Carnival (1972). University of Texas Press.
- A Time and a Season – Eight Caribbean Plays, ed. (1976). Carifesta and UWI Extra-Mural Department, Mona.
- The Theater of Black Americans (1980), Prentice-Hall.
- Shakespeare in Sable: A History of Black Shakespearean Actors (April 1986), University of Massachusetts Press.
- The Jamaican Stage, 1655–1900 (1992), University of Massachusetts Press.
- Cambridge Guide to African and Caribbean Theatre, ed. (1994).
- A History of African American Theatre, ed. with James V. Hatch (2003), Cambridge University Press. ISBN 0521624436.
