= Cecil Browne =

Cecil Browne may refer to:

- Cecil Browne (ice hockey) (1896–1985), Canadian ice hockey left winger
- Cecil Wyndham Browne, Anglican priest in Ireland
- Cecil Browne (author) (born 1957), British and Vincentian writer

== See also ==
- Cecil Brown (disambiguation)
