= Cecil Brown =

Cecil Brown may refer to:

- Cecil Brown (journalist) (1907–1987), American war correspondent
- Cecil Brown (writer) (born 1943), American novelist
- Cecil Brown (Mississippi politician) (born 1944), American politician and member of the Mississippi House of Representatives
- Cecil Brown (cricketer) (1895–1955), English cricketer
- Cecil Brown (architect) (1902–1983), restoration architect of St Lawrence Jewry and other churches destroyed in the London blitz
- Cecil Brown (Hawaii politician) (1850–1917), Hawaiian politician, lawyer, and bank president
- Cecil B. Brown Jr. (1926–2006), American activist, businessman, and legislator
- Cecil H. Brown (born 1944), American anthropologist
- Cecil Valentine Brown (1845–1875), British chess player

== See also ==
- Cecil Browne (ice hockey) (1896–1985), Canadian ice hockey player
- Cecil Browne (author) (born 1957), author
- Cecil Wyndham Browne, Anglican priest in Ireland
