= Let's Tell This Story Properly =

Short story by Jennifer Nansubuga Makumbi

"Let's Tell This Story Properly" is a short story written by Ugandan novelist and short story writer Jennifer Nansubuga Makumbi. The short story was published in Granta in 2014. The short story was shortlisted for the 2014 Commonwealth Short Story Prize, and emerged Regional Winner, Africa region. She was the Overall Winner of the 2014 Commonwealth Short Story Prize. The short story was longlisted for the 2014 Etisalat Prize for Literature.
