= Efua Traoré =

Nigerian-German story writer

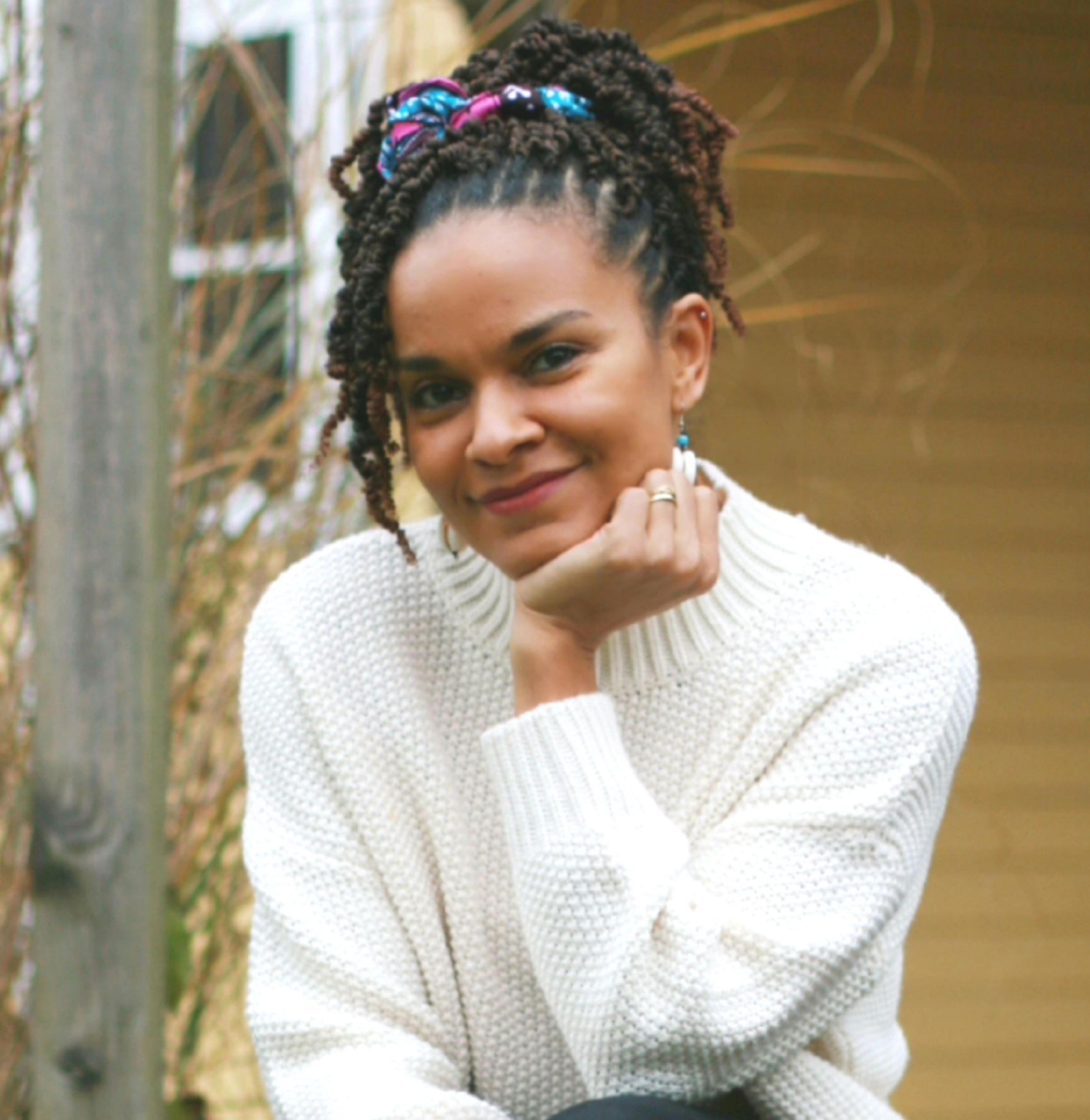
- Occupation: Story writer
- Notable work: True Happiness (short story); Children of the Quicksands (novel)
- Awards: Commonwealth Short Story Prize (2018)

Efua Traoré is a Nigerian-German story writer. She won the regional Commonwealth Short Story Prize in 2018 and was nominated for the Waterstones Children's Book Prize in 2022.

== Life and career ==
Traoré was born and raised in a small town in the south of Nigeria. She has also resided in France and Germany.

She won the Africa regional Commonwealth Short Story Prize for her short story "True Happiness" in 2018. In 2019, her debut novel "Children of the Quicksands" won The Times/Chicken House Children’s Fiction Competition. The novel was also shortlisted for the Waterstones Children's Book Prize in 2022.

She received the Munich Literaturreferat YA Literature grant 2019 for her German novel Die Hüter des Schlafes (The Guardians of Sleep).

== Books ==
- Children of the Quicksands (2021) — a fantasy novel published by The Chicken House
- The House of Shells (2022) — a children's novel published by The Chicken House

== Awards ==
Year	Title	Work	Result	Presented by	Ref.
2018	Commonwealth Short Story Prize	True Happiness	Won	Commonwealth Foundation	
2019	The Times/Chicken House Children’s Fiction Competition	Children of the Quicksands	Won	The Times / Chicken House	
2022	Waterstones Children's Book Prize	Children of the Quicksands	Nominated	Waterstones	
