= Lynda Clark =

Lynda Clark may refer to:

- Lynda Clark, Baroness Clark of Calton (born 1949), Scottish judge and politician
- Lynda Clark (author) (born 1981), author and creator of interactive fiction
