= Jekwu Anyaegbuna =

Nigerian story writer and poet

Jekwu Anyaegbuna is a Nigerian writer and poet. He was the first story writer from Nigeria to win the Commonwealth Short Story Prize in 2012. His stories have been published in several notable literary journals in the United States and the UK.

== Education and career ==
Anyaegbuna graduated from the University of Ilorin. Writing a short story "Morrison Okoli (1955–2010)", he was shortlisted for the Africa regional Commonwealth Short Story Prize and finally received it in May 2012.

In 2017, Anyaegbuna received a scholarship from the University of East Anglia (UEA) to study creative writing (MA Prose Fiction).

== Books ==
- The Swimming Pool (2013)

== Awards ==
Year	Title	Work	Result	Presented by	Ref.
2012	Commonwealth Short Story Prize	Morrison Okoli (1955–2010)	Won	Commonwealth Foundation	
