= Jennifer Nansubuga Makumbi =

Ugandan novelist and short story writer

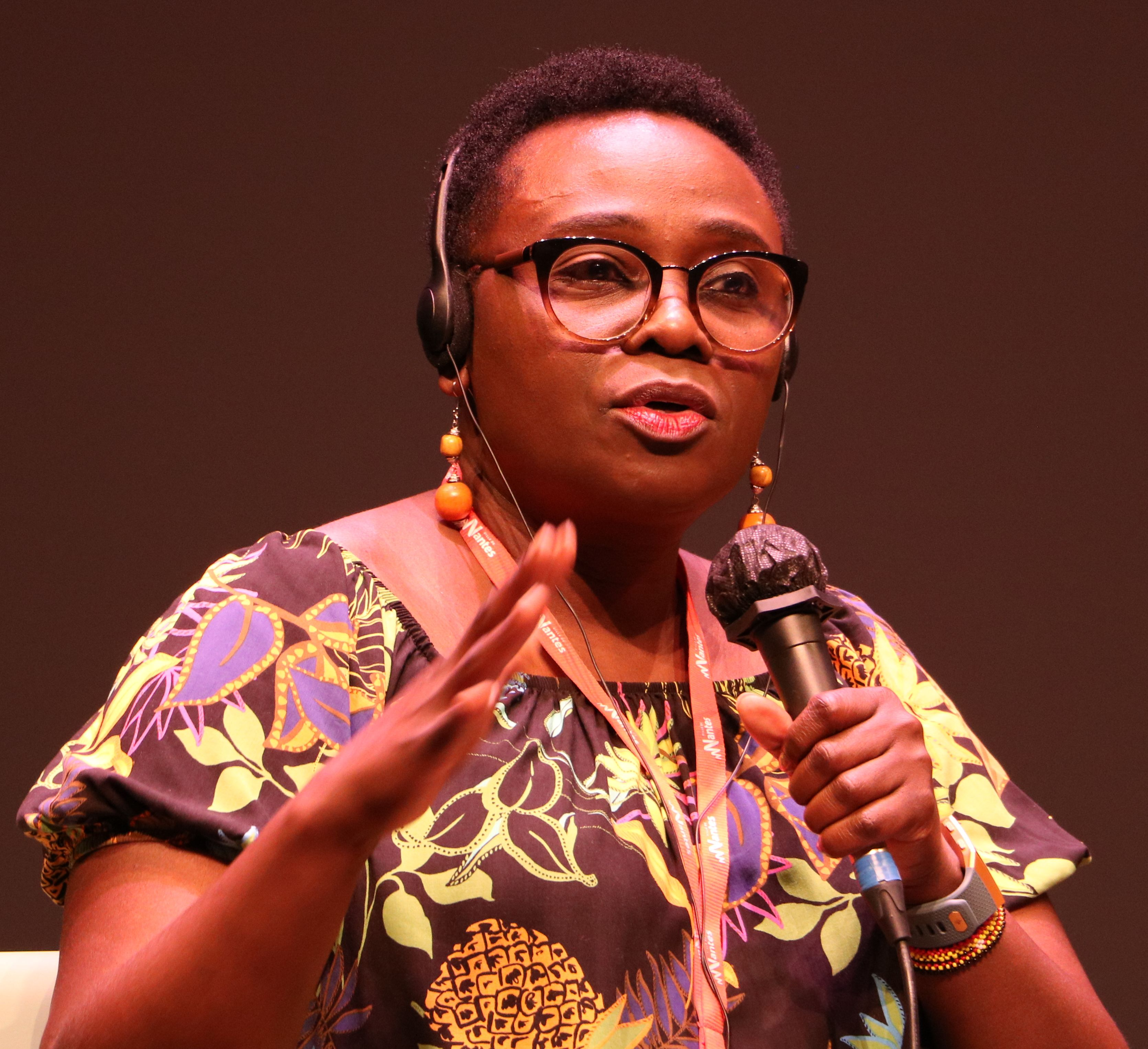
- Born: Kampala, Uganda
- Education: Islamic University in Uganda; Lancaster University
- Occupation: Writer
- Writing career
- Genre: Fiction
- Notable works: Kintu; The First Woman
- Notable awards: Kwani? Manuscript Project; Commonwealth Short Story Prize; Windham-Campbell Prize; Jhalak Prize

Jennifer Nansubuga Makumbi (born 1960s) is a Ugandan-British novelist and short story writer. Her doctoral novel, The Kintu Saga, was shortlisted and won the Kwani? Manuscript Project in 2013. It was published by Kwani Trust in 2014 under the title Kintu. Her short story collection, Manchester Happened, was published in 2019. She was shortlisted for the 2014 Commonwealth Short Story Prize for her story "Let's Tell This Story Properly", and emerged Regional Winner, Africa region. She was declared the Overall Winner of the 2014 prize. Makumbi was also longlisted for the 2014 Etisalat Prize for Literature, was in 2019 awarded a Windham-Campbell Prize in the fiction category, and in 2021 won the Jhalak Prize with her novel The First Woman.

Makumbi is a lecturer in Creative Writing at Lancaster University. She lives in Manchester with her husband, Damian, and son, Jordan.

== Early life and education ==
Jennifer Nansubuga Makumbi was born and raised in Kampala, Uganda. She is the eldest child of Anthony Kizito Makumbi and the third of Evelyn Nnakalembe. Her parents separated when she was two years old and for two years she lived with her grandfather Elieza Makumbi. During Idi Amin's regime, her father, a banker, was arrested and brutalised. Though he was saved from being killed, he suffered from mental health issues for the rest of his life. Makumbi was brought up by her aunt, Catherine Makumbi-Kulubya. She lived with her family first at Nakasero, then later at Kololo.

She attended Trinity College Nabbingo for O-levels and King's College Budo for A-levels. She did a B.A. degree in Education, majoring in teaching English and Literature in English at the Islamic University in Uganda, where she edited the university magazine, The IUIU Mirror. Makumbi first taught at Nakasero High, an A-level school, then for eight years taught at Hillside High School, an international school in Uganda.

At that time she wrote a play, Sitaani Teyebase, in Luganda for an inter-zone competition. This play won the competition and toured many of the SDA churches within Kampala.

In September 2001, she enrolled at Manchester Metropolitan University to do an MA in Creative Writing. She completed a PhD in Creative writing at Lancaster University. Makumbi has taught at various universities in the UK teaching both English and Creative Writing as an Associate Lecturer. Her writing relies heavily on Ganda oral traditions, especially myths, legends, folktales and sayings.

== Writing ==
Makumbi began writing at the age of 15, when she wrote, directed and produced a play for a school competition. It came in third. She wrote another play when she was 18 and it too came third. While in Senior 3, she wrote her first play for an inter-house competition, which came third. She wrote her second play again for an inter-house competition at A-level, and once again the play came third. Both of these plays were written in English. In 1994, she started writing a diary in poetry form to expunge her feelings as she was going through a rough patch in her life. She wrote more than 50 poems but never bothered to share them with the public. She started writing prose in 1998 while she was teaching in Kampala.

Makumbi's writing is predominantly based on the oral traditions. She realised that oral traditions were so broad and would be able to frame all her writing regardless of subject, form or genre. She has said she "noticed that using oral forms which were normally perceived as trite and 'tired' brought, ironically, a certain depth to a piece that I could not explain." Her intentions in using oral traditions in fiction are not conservationist as is often presumed in African writing. She draws on oral forms because they anchor her writing in Ganda culture. At the same time, because these oral forms are rooted in her first language, she is confident using them.

Her work has been published by African Writing Online and Commonword. She also runs the African reading group ARG! in Manchester, which focuses on obscure African writers. In 2012, her short story "The Accidental Seaman" was published in Moss Side Stories by Crocus Books. In 2013, her poems "Free Range" and "Father cried in the kitchen" were published in Sweet Tongues.

Her doctoral novel, The Kintu Saga, won the Kwani? Manuscript Project, a new literary prize for unpublished fiction by African writers, and was published under the title Kintu in 2014, being longlisted for the Etisalat Prize for Literature. She was shortlisted for the 2014 Commonwealth Short Story Prize alongside two other African contenders (Adelehin Ijasan from Nigeria and Michelle Sacks from South Africa), going on to become the overall winner with her entry "Let's Tell This Story Properly".

In March 2018, she was one of eight writers to be awarded a Windham-Campbell Prize, the citation noting: "Kintu tells the parallel stories of the fall of a cursed bloodline—the titular Kintu clan—and the rise of modern Uganda. With an extraordinarily ambitious and agile narrative voice that blends traditional oral storytelling with folk tales, mythology, and biblical elements, Makumbi delivers an incisive critique of contemporary Ugandan class, politics, and religion. Critic Aaron Bady has said that Kintu is a novel about how "all families are built out of silences and fictions." Kintu traces the lineages of these lacunae, in the process charting new possibilities for the future of the African novel."

Interviewed by C. A. Davids in 2018 for The Johannesburg Review of Books, Makumbi said: "The West has too much influence on, and control of, our canon. The books they like—which tend to talk about Europe—are the ones they publish, which get reviewed, studied, written about in journals and which make it into the African canon. That is dangerous. We should wrench the power away from the West and determine our own canon, curated by African publishers and African reviewers."

Makumbi is a contributor to the 2019 anthology New Daughters of Africa, edited by Margaret Busby.

Makumbi's second novel, The First Woman (2020) – published in the US under the title A Girl Is a Body of Water – has received much acclaim. It was described by Alex Clark in The Guardian as "a lively, engaging read ... its energy derives from its considerable wit and the charm of its central character", and in World Literature Today, Adele Newson-Horst called it "spellbinding". Further praise came from The Washington Post, where Bethanne Patrick referred to "Makumbi's glorious telling", while The New York Times concluded: "The reader cannot escape the intimacy of this story. Makumbi's prose is irresistible and poignant, with remarkable wit, heart and charm — poetic and nuanced, brilliant and sly, openhearted and cunning, balancing discordant truths in wise ruminations. 'A Girl Is a Body of Water' rewards the reader with one of the most outstanding heroines and the incredible honor of journeying by her side." The reviewer in New African (Zimbabwe) wrote that it is "a beautiful book for women, about women, that should be read by all men who would like to understand women". The First Woman was awarded the 2021 Jhalak Prize for Book of the Year.

== Published works ==
=== Novels ===
- Kintu. Kwani Trust, Nairobi. 2014. ISBN 978-9966-1598-9-2. Oakland: Transit Books, 2017. ISBN 9781945492013. London: Oneworld Publications, 2018, ISBN 978-1786073778
- The First Woman, Oneworld Publications, 2020
  - A Girl Is a Body of Water. Tin House Books. p. 450. ISBN 1951142551.

=== Short story collection ===
- Manchester Happened. Oneworld Publications. 2019. ISBN 9781786075895.

=== Short stories ===
- "Let's Tell This Story Properly", in Granta, 2014
- "The Joys of Fatherhood", in African Writing Online
- "The accidental sea man", in Moss Side Stories, 2012

== Talks ==
"When We Fall Silent Someone Fills Our Silence: How Europe Filled Africa's Silence", Entwicklungsministerium (Ministry of Development), 2023

== Awards and honours ==
- 2013: Kwani? Manuscript Project, winner
- 2014: Etisalat Prize for Literature, longlist
- 2014: Commonwealth Short Story Prize, regional winner, Africa
- 2014: Commonwealth Short Story Prize, Overall winner
- 2018: Windham–Campbell Literature Prize in Fiction
- 2019: Edward Stanford Travel Writing Awards, shortlist
- 2019: Prix Transfuge du meilleur premier roman français, winner
- 2019: Hearst UK Big Book Awards, shortlist
- 2019: Prix Medicis, longlist
- 2020: Prix Les Afriques, shortlist
- 2020: 100 Most Influential Africans, New African magazine
- 2021: Jhalak Prize, winner
- 2021: Diverse Book Awards, shortlist
- 2021: Encore Award, shortlist
- 2021: James Tait Black Memorial Prize, shortlist

== See also ==
- Ugandan diaspora
