= Kintu (disambiguation) =

Kintu is a Bugandan mythological figure. It may also refer to:

- Michael Kintu, former chief minister of Buganda
- Kato Kintu, the first kabaka (king) of the Buganda kingdom
- Kintu Musoke, former Prime Minister of Uganda
- Kintu (novel), a novel by Ugandan author Jennifer Nansubuga Makumbi
