= Jamir Nazir =

Trinidadian writer

Jamir Nazir is a Trinidadian writer and poet who won the 2026 Commonwealth Short Story Prize for his short story "The Serpent in the Grove".

== Career ==
Nazir attended Reform Presbyterian Primary School and San Fernando Government Secondary School before studying agriculture at the University of the West Indies. He later obtained a Bachelor of Science degree and a Master of Business Administration in financial services in the United States.

After returning to Trinidad and Tobago, Nazir worked in the insurance industry. He subsequently worked in the public service for six and a half years, serving as head of policy and strategy at the Office of the Prime Minister and later as director of strategic services in its Policy, Strategy and Government Performance Management Division.

Nazir began writing poetry at the age of ten and continued writing privately for several decades. He self-published two poetry collections, Night Moon Love (2017) and One a Day (2019).

In 2026, his short story "The Serpent in the Grove" won the Caribbean regional award of the Commonwealth Short Story Prize before being selected as the overall winner. Following allegations that the story had been generated using artificial intelligence, Nazir denied the claims, and the Commonwealth Foundation stated that its review had found that AI had not been used to write the winning stories.
