= Kritika Pandey =

Indian writer

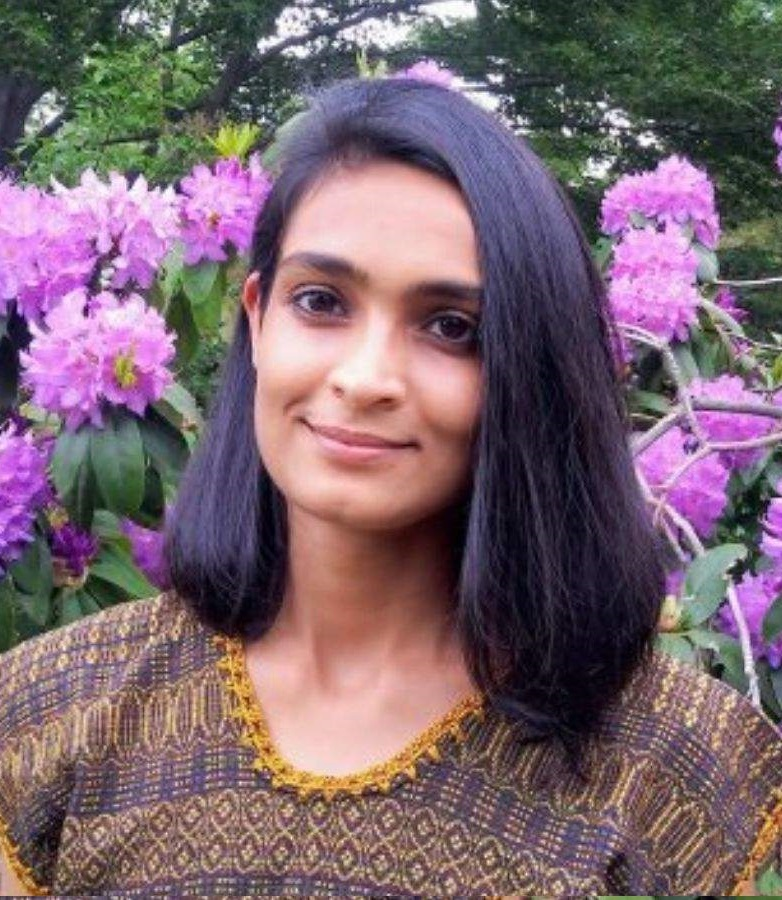
- Born: 1991 (age 34–35); Ranchi, Jharkhand, India
- Education: (BE) Birla Institute of Technology, Mesra; (MFA) University of Massachusetts
- Occupation: Writer
- Writing career
- Genre: Short story
- Notable awards: Commonwealth Short Story Prize (2020)

Kritika Pandey is an Indian writer, well known for her short story writing. She is the recipient of a 2021 residency grant at the Helene Wurlitzer Foundation. She is the overall winner of the Commonwealth Short Story Prize in 2020, having been shortlisted for the prize in 2018 as well as 2016.

== Notable works ==
- The Great Indian Tee and Snakes (Short Story) Granta
- Profound Earthly Suffering (Short Story) BBC Radio 4
- How Do I Talk to My Father About Constellations? (Personal Essay) The Kenyon Review
- The Goddess Who Wants Out (Short Story) The Bombay Literary Magazine
- Thirty-One Things About the Lime of Control (Personal Essay) The Common
