= U.S. national banks of Hawaii =

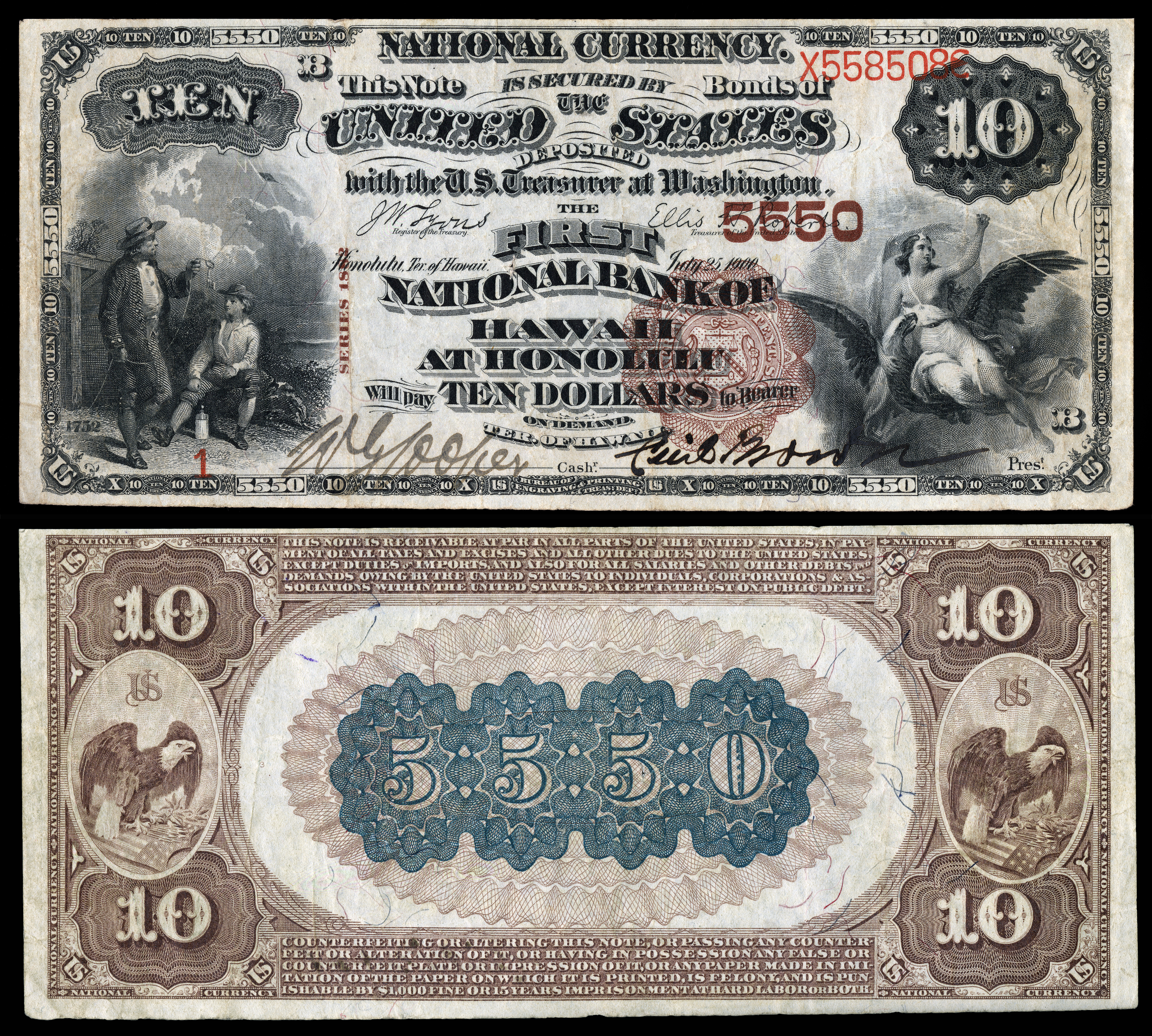
The first $10 National Bank Note issued by The First National Bank of Hawaii at Honolulu, Territory of Hawaii (1900). Signed by Cecil Brown (President) and W.G. Cooper (Cashier)

The first bank established in the Kingdom of Hawaii was Bishop & Co., founded by Charles Reed Bishop and William A. Aldrich in 1858. Almost 25 years later, Spreckels & Co. was founded by Claus Spreckels in partnership with William G. Irwin in 1884. The Kingdom opened the Hawaiian Postal Savings Bank on July 1, 1886. By 1895 the Yokohama Specie Bank opened a branch in Honolulu and the merchant importer/exporter Hackfeld & Co. went into banking. Following the annexation of Hawaii in July 1898, plans were set in motion to establish the First American Bank of Hawaii backed by investors in New York and California. A prospectus soliciting stock subscriptions was released on May 8, 1899, and the bank opened for business on September 5, 1899. The founding board of directors included Cecil Brown (President), B.F. Dillingham (Vice-President), M.P. Robinson, Bruce Cartwright, and G.W. Macfarlane. Additional officers included W.G. Cooper (Cashier), E.M. Boyd (Secretary), and George F. McLeod (Auditor). The expressed purpose for founding the bank was to eventually convert it into a National Bank under the National Bank Act. On April 30, 1900 a special act of Congress extended the National Banking Act to include the Territory of Hawaii.

== The First National Bank of Hawaii at Honolulu ==
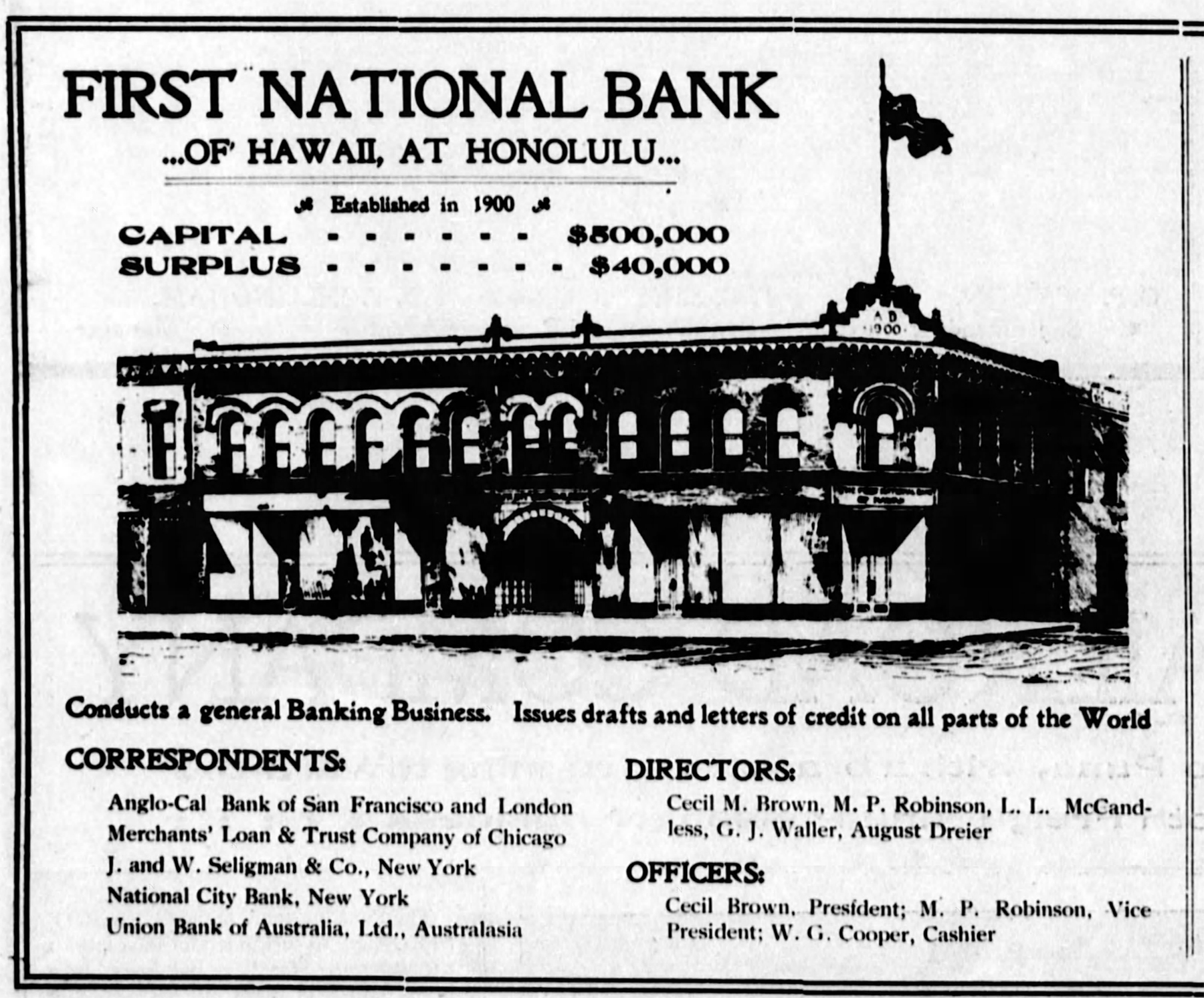
First National Bank of Hawaii at Honolulu (ad on November 30, 1901)

The First National Bank of Hawaii at Honolulu was organized on July 25, 1900 and received operational authorization (bank charter #5550) from the Comptroller of the Treasury on August 23, 1900. The bank opened for business on October 1, 1900 with $500,000 capital on deposit with the U.S. Treasury.

The founding board of directors included: Cecil Brown (President), Mark P. Robinson (Vice-president), Bruce Cartwright, Frank Hustace, and George Macfarlane. By the end of 1901 only Brown and Robinson remained from the founding group, joined by Lincoln L. McCandless, Gilbert J. Waller, and August Dreier.

The initial national bank notes issued in 1900 were signed by bank president Cecil Brown and cashier W.G. Cooper. Cooper was replaced by Levi Tenney Peck in 1905. Due in large part to failing health, in 1915 Brown resigned as president to become Chairman of the Board and Peck became president. Brown died in 1917.

The bank changed titles (name) several times. The First National Bank of Hawaii at Honolulu, the First American Savings Bank, the Army National Bank of Schofield Barracks, and the Baldwin National Bank of Kahului merged to form the Bishop First National Bank of Honolulu on July 6, 1929. On November 3, 1933, the bank’s title was changed to the Bishop National Bank of Hawaii at Honolulu. On April 15, 1960 the title dropped “Honolulu” becoming The First National Bank of Hawaii. Finally, on January 2, 1969 the bank gave up its converted from a national to a state bank with the title The First Bank of Hawaii.

During the course of its charter as a U.S. national bank, the First National Bank of Hawaii at Honolulu (first title) issued 977,832 large size banknotes (1900–28), the Bishop First National Bank at Honolulu (second title) issued 696,672 small size banknotes (1929–33), and the Bishop National Bank at Honolulu (third title) issued 149,488 small size banknotes (1933–35).

== The First National Bank of Wailuku ==
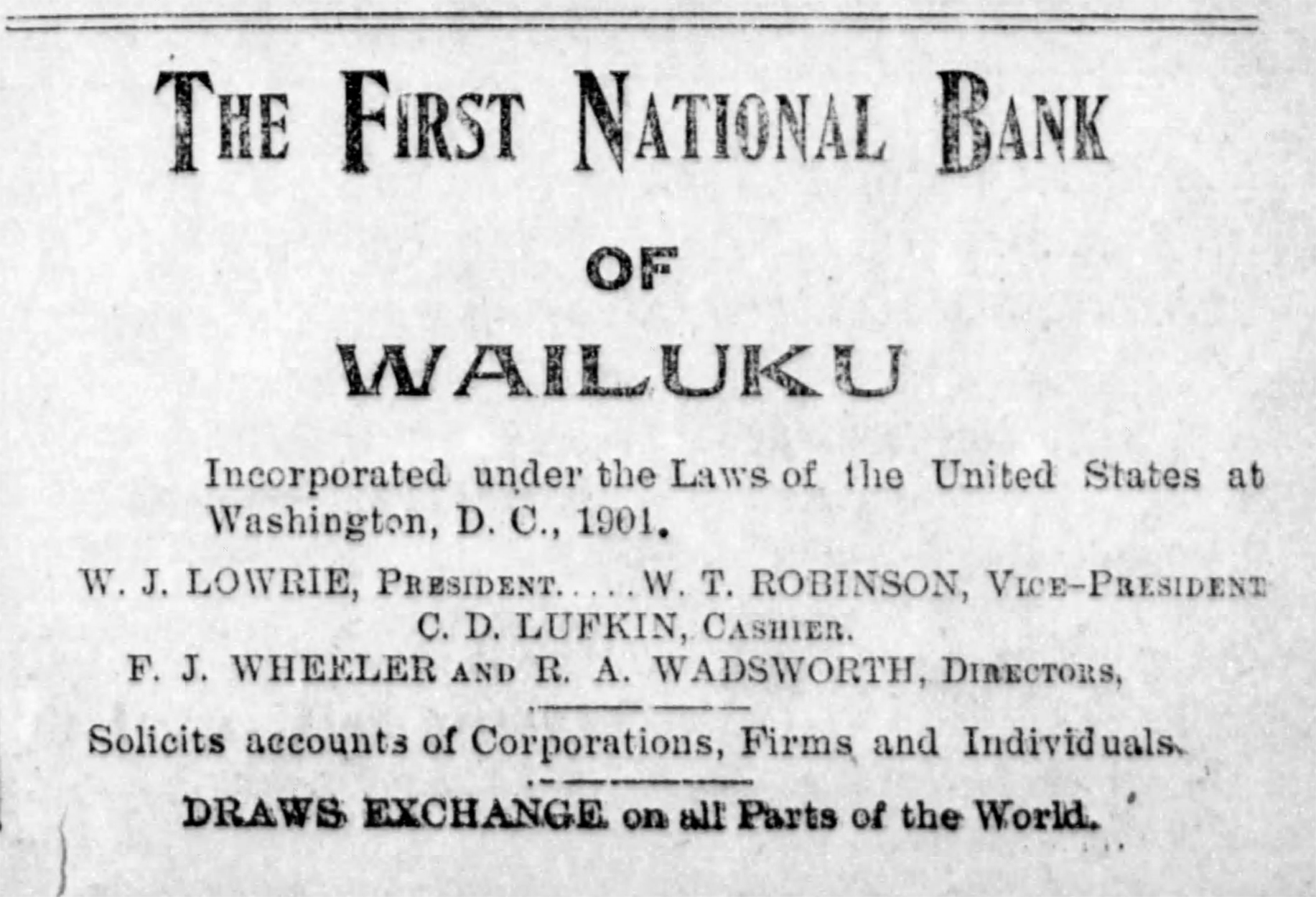
The First National Bank of Wailuku (ad on December 28, 1901)

The First National Bank of Wailuku was organized on September 5, 1901 and received charter #5994 from the Comptroller of the Treasury on October 17, 1901. The bank opened for business on November 27, 1901.

The founding board of directors included: Charles M. Cooke (President), Charles D. Lufkin (Cashier), Clarence H. Cooke, Joseph B. Atherton, and Cecil Brown. Four months later Lufkin was the only original director remaining: W.J. Lowrie (President), W.T. Robinson (VP), Charles D. Lufkin (Cashier), F.J. Wheeler, and Ralph A. Wadsworth. The bank was initially capitalized at $25,000 in 1902 and raised to $35,000 in 1904.

Charles Cooke returned as president in 1903 and served until his death (August 27, 1909). He was succeeded by his son Clarence Hyde Cooke.

The First National Bank of Wailuku issued 11,964 large size banknotes for a total of $97,800 in circulating notes. Only two banknotes are currently known to exist.

== The Lahaina National Bank ==
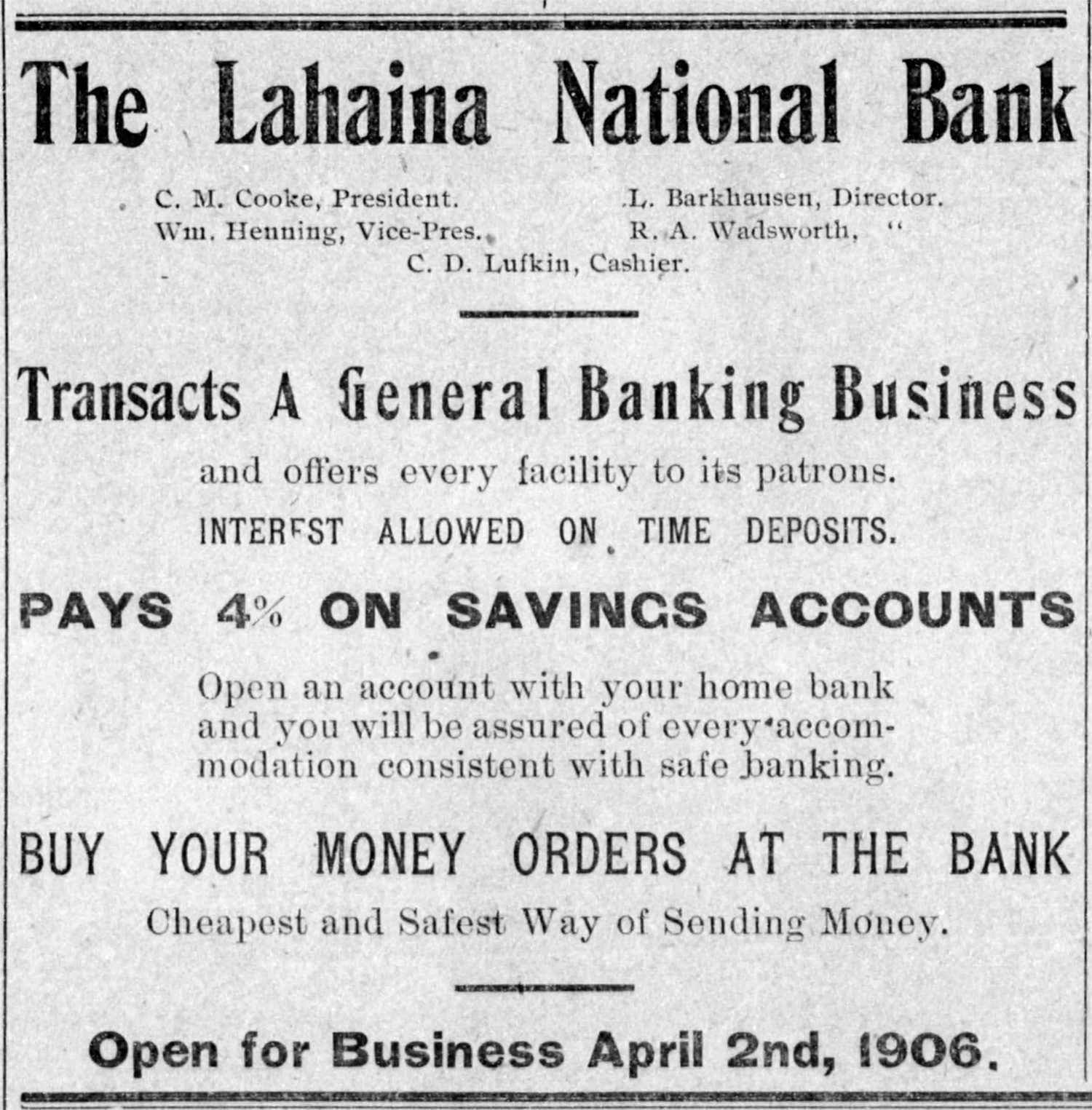
The Lahaina National Bank (ad on March 31, 1906)

The Lahaina National Bank was organized (approval given) on April 17, 1903 with the following directors: Charles D. Lufkin, Ralph A. Wadsworth, W.T. Robinson, David C. Lindsay, and Clarence H. Cooke. A charter for the bank (#8101) was not issued by the Treasury Department until February 1906, (capitalized at $25,000) by which time the board consisted of Charles M. Cooke (President), Charles D. Lufkin (Vice-president), Frank C. Atherton (Cashier), Peter C. Jones, and Clarence H. Cooke. When the bank opened for business on April 2, 1906 the roster of directors had some additional changes: Charles M. Cooke (President), William Henning (Vice-president), Charles D. Lufkin (Cashier), Ralph A. Wadsworth, and L. Barkhausen.

The Lahaina National Bank issued 1,772 large size banknotes for a total of $22,150 in circulating notes. Only one banknote is currently known to exist.

== The Baldwin National Bank of Kahului ==
The Baldwin National Bank of Kahului was organized on February 20, 1906 and received charter #8207 from the Comptroller of the Treasury on May 5, 1906. The bank was initially capitalized at $40,000, but increased the amount to $50,000 the following year.

The founding board of directors was made up of Henry Perrine Baldwin (President), Joseph P. Cooke (Vice-president), David C. Lindsay (Cashier), John N.S. Williams, and Samuel M. Damon. Henry Perrine Baldwin died in 1911 and was succeeded as bank president by his son, Henry Alexander Baldwin.

The Baldwin National Bank issued 19,964 large size banknotes for a total of $161,950 in circulating notes. Five banknotes are currently known to exist. The bank gave up its national charter in 1921 to become the Baldwin Bank Limited, capitalized at $100,000 with George S. Waterhouse (president) and G.D. Baldwin (cashier) as officers.

== The First National Bank of Paia ==
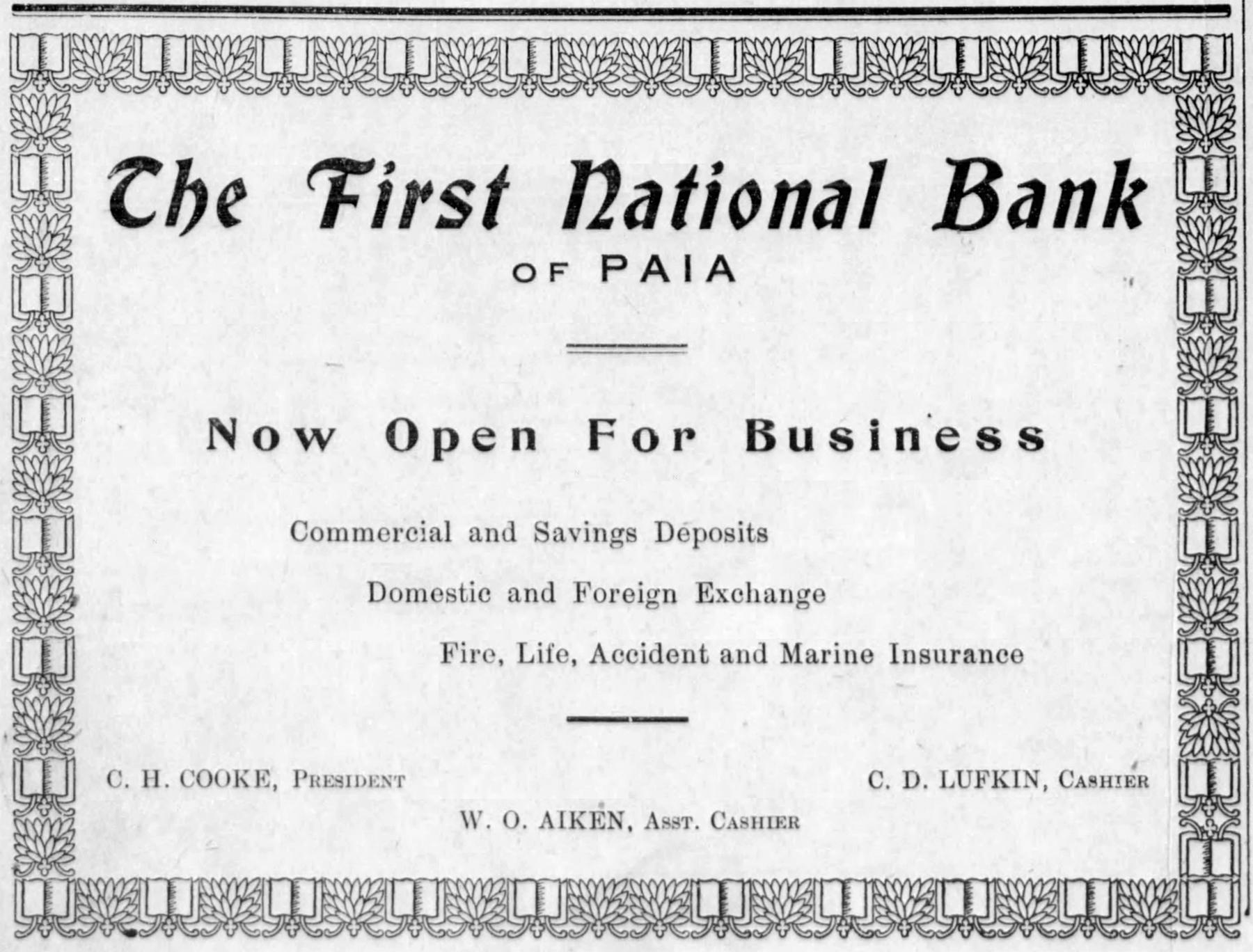
The First National Bank of Paia (ad on October 25, 1913)

The First National Bank of Paia was organized in March 1913 and received charter #10451 from the Comptroller of the Treasury on September 26, 1913 capitalized at $25,000. The bank opened for business on October 20, 1913.

The founding board of directors was made up of Clarence H. Cooke (President), Charles D. Lufkin (Cashier), Ralph A. Wadsworth, Daniel H. Case, and Joaquin Garcia.

The First National Bank of Paia initially ordered 2,200 banknotes (in 10s and 20s) from the Office of the Comptroller of the Currency but amended the order to 800 notes for a total of $10,000 in circulating notes. There are no known examples and it is suspected that the notes were never issued by the bank and returned to the Comptroller upon liquidation.

== The Army National Bank of Schofield Barracks ==
The United States Army gave Bishop & Company permission (June 24, 1914) to construct a temporary building to serve as a banking facility at Schofield Barracks. During the week of January 8, 1917, the Bishop & Company branch office submitted an application to organize as a National Bank.

On June 5, 1917, the Department of Justice issued a favorable opinion on the application, and the Army National Bank of Schofield Barracks received charter #11050 from the Comptroller of the Treasury on August 3, 1917. capitalized at $100,000.

The founding board of directors was made up of Ernest H. Wodehouse (President), Allen W.T. Bottomley (Vice-president), Orville N. Tyler (Cashier), James D. Dole, John Waterhouse, Harold G. Dillingham, and Joseph O. Carter.

The Army National Bank did not issue banknotes.

== Bank of Maui ==
The National banks in Wailuku, Lahaina, and Paia were all organized by Charles Dexter Lufkin, generally in partnership with the Cooke family (either Charles or Clarence as president), and Lufkin as cashier. The National Banking Act did not allow chartered banks to have branches so Lufkin et al. opened separate banks but under the same management. In essence, The Lahaina National Bank and The First National Bank of Paia were functioning as branches of the First National Bank of Wailuku. National banking laws also prohibited the use of real estate as loan collateral. Citing this in three separate bank shareholder meetings (all held the same day), the management of the three banks proposed relinquishing their charters as national banks and incorporating under the laws of the Territory of Hawaii.

On April 30, 1917 the Bank of Maui, Limited, was chartered by the Territorial Treasurer with Clarence Cooke as president. The Office of the Comptroller of the Currency lists all three banks as going into liquidation on May 1, 1917.

== Officers authorized to sign National bank notes ==
FNB Hawaii (1900–35)
| President | Cashier |
|---|---|
| C. Brown (1900–15) | W.G. Cooper (1900–06) |
| C. Brown (1900–15) | L.T. Peck (1906–15) |
| L.T. Peck (1915–1919) | Rudolf Buchly (1915–19) |
| H.M. von Holt (1919) | W.H. Campbell (1919–29) |
| L.T. Peck (1920–1929) | W.H. Campbell (1919–29) |
| A.W.T. Bottomley (1929–33) | O.N. Tyler (1929–35) |
| J. Waterhouse (1933–35) | O.N. Tyler (1929–35) |
Vice-presidents: M.P. Johnson, M.P. Robinson (VP), and H.M. von Holt. Assistant cashiers: W.H. Campbell, C.A. Stobie, and J.H. Ellis.

FNB Wailuku (1901–17)
| President | Cashier |
|---|---|
| W.J. Lowrie (1901–02) | C.D. Lufkin (1901–17) |
| C.M. Cooke (1902–14) | C.D. Lufkin (1901–17) |
| C.H. Cooke (1914–1917) | C.D. Lufkin (1901–17) |
Vice-presidents: W.T. Robinson, D.H. Case, and R.A. Wadsworth. Assistant cashier: J. Garcia.

Lahaina NB (1906–17)
| President | Cashier |
|---|---|
| C.M. Cooke (1906–14) | F.C. Atherton (1906) |
| C.M. Cooke (1906–14) | C.D. Lufkin (1906–1917) |
| C.H. Cooke (1914–17) | C.D. Lufkin (1906–1917) |
Vice-presidents: W. Henning and W.L. Decoto. Assistant cashiers: H.J. Morvay and V.C. Schoenberg.

Baldwin NB (1906–17)
| President | Cashier |
|---|---|
| H.A. Baldwin (1906–10) | D.C. Lindsay (1906–11) |
| H.P. Baldwin (1910–12) | D.C. Lindsay (1906–11) |
| H.P. Baldwin (1910–12) | W. Roberson (1911) |
| H.A. Baldwin (1912–1917) | D.C. Lindsay (1912–16) |
| H.A. Baldwin (1912–1917) | A.C. Rattray (1916) |
| H.A. Baldwin (1912–1917) | D.C. Lindsay (1917) |
Vice-presidents: J.P. Cooke and F.E. Baldwin.

FNB Paia (1913–17)
| President | Cashier |
|---|---|
| C.H. Cooke (1913–17) | C.D. Lufkin (1913–17) |
Vice-president: R.A. Wadsworth. Assistant cashier: W.O. Aiken.

Army NB (1918–)
| President | Cashier |
|---|---|
| E.H. Woodhouse (1917–18) | O.N. Tyler (1917–18) |
| Henry Holmes (1919–25) | J. Macaulay (1919–) |
| H.G. Dillingham (1925–) | J. Macaulay (1919–) |
Vice-presidents: A.W.T. Bottomley and J.D. Dole. Assistant cashiers: J. Macaulay, T.S. Abel, and A. Tyler.
