= A Girl Is a Body of Water =

2020 novel by Jennifer Nansubuga Makumbi

- Cover of the 2020 Tin House Books edition
- Author: Jennifer Nansubuga Makumbi
- Language: English
- Publication date: 2020

A Girl Is a Body of Water is a 2020 novel by Ugandan writer Jennifer Nansubuga Makumbi. It was published in North America by Tin House Books and in the United Kingdom by Oneworld Publications under the title The First Woman. The novel is set in 1970s Uganda during the rule of Idi Amin. It follows Kirabo, a girl raised in the village of Nattetta by her grandparents, as she searches for her absent mother and comes of age amid competing expectations about womanhood. Under its UK title, the novel won the 2021 Jhalak Prize and was shortlisted for the 2021 Encore Award.

== Awards ==
Under the title The First Woman, the novel won the Jhalak Prize in 2021. It was also shortlisted for the Encore Award and longlisted for the Aspen Words Literary Prize.
