= Sharma Taylor =

Jamaican writer (fl. 2026)

Sharma Taylor is a Jamaican writer and lawyer living in Barbados. She was one of the judges for the 2026 Commonwealth Short Story Prize.

== Early life and education ==
Taylor has LLB and LLM degrees from the University of the West Indies, and a PhD in Copyright Law from Victoria University of Wellington in New Zealand.

== Career ==
Taylor's first novel, What a Mother's Love Don't Teach You, was published by Virago Press in 2022. It was developed from her short story "Son Son's Birthday" which was shortlisted for the 2018 Commonwealth Short Story Prize.

== Awards and recognition ==
Taylor won the 2020 Queen Mary Wasafiri New Writing Prize for her "How You Make Jamaican Coconut Oil". and won the 2020 Frank Collymore Literary Endowment award for her "Hollow Calabash".

She has been shortlisted four times for the Commonwealth Short Story Prize, including in 2018 for "Son Son's Birthday", in 2020 for "Cash and Carry" and in 2022 for "Have Mercy"

She was awarded a bronze Musgrave Medal in 2023.

== Selected publications ==
- Taylor, Sharma (2023). What a Mother's Love Don't Teach You. Virago. ISBN 9780349015545.
- Taylor, Sharma (2022). Genuine Human Hair. Virago. ISBN 9780349017396.
