= Anushka Jasraj =

Indian writer

- Education: University of Texas-Austin
- Writing career
- Genre: Short Story
- Notable awards: Commonwealth Short Story Prize for Asia
- Website: https://www.anushkajasraj.com/

Anushka Jasraj is a fiction writer from Mumbai, India. She has twice been selected as Asia Regional Winner for the Commonwealth Short Story Prize in 2012 and 2017.

== Life ==
She holds a BFA in film production from New York University and a MFA in creative writing from the New Writers Project as well as a MA in women's and gender studies from the University of Texas-Austin. She was a 2015–16 fellow at the Fine Arts Work Center in Provincetown, Massachusetts, and was awarded the 2017 Stars at Night emerging writer award by American Short Fiction.

Her work has been published in Scroll.in, Internazionale, Adda Stories, and Granta.
