= Sharon Millar =

Trinidadian writer

- Education: Lesley University
- Occupation: Writer
- Awards: Commonwealth Short Story Prize, 2013

Sharon Millar is a Trinidadian writer. She was awarded the Commonwealth Short Story Prize in 2013 for "The Whale House".

== Life ==
Sharon Millar lives in Port of Spain with her husband and daughter. She can trace her "roots in the Caribbean to the 17th century. I come from English, Portuguese, French, and Scottish ancestry." Her works often focus on the themes of race and identity in the Caribbean and she has said: "my biggest challenge is to write against all the stereotypes of the Caribbean. The rest of the world sees the Caribbean region as having one culture, one people, one collective history. I think it's up to the fiction writers to show the world that each island is different and that we are much more than the tropical stereotype."

Millar began writing fiction in workshops in the early 1990s under the mentorship of Wayne Brown and credits her commitment to "writing seriously" to "when I began writing with Wayne Brown again" in 2009. She holds an MFA degree in Creative Writing from Lesley University and has lectured in Prose Fiction at the University of the West Indies, St. Augustine.

Millar has also worked as a journalist, writing extensively for Caribbean Beat and won a CTO Travel Media Award for her 2015 "Mermen Come Calling" piece in The New York Times. Both her non-fiction and fiction writings explore folklore, legends, and the cultural distinctiveness of the Caribbean. Readers may notice that material from her journalism often appears in a different form in her fiction. In addition to writing, Millar has taught creative writing at the University of the West Indies.

== Works ==
Millar had her first international publication in Granta magazine with "The Whale House" and her work has appeared in other publications including The Manchester Review, Small Axe, WomanSpeak, Griffith Review, and PREE. Her story "The Whale House" was also anthologised in Pepperpot: Best New Stories from The Caribbean.

The Whale House, her first collection of short stories published by Peepal Tree Press, was praised by Claire Adam in The Guardian for its honest reflection of "contemporary Trinidad and Tobago society, with its racial tensions, still-open wounds of history, undercurrents of folklore and the supernatural". Shivanee Ramlochan, a fellow Trinidadian writer and reviewer writing in Caribbean Beat, admired Millar's "dazzling attention to language's depths, suffusing her character descriptions and place evocations with a sensuous, restrained prose that feeds full-fathoms from the wild majesty of verdant ecosystems." Jérôme Cooper, reviewing for the Dundee University Review of the Arts, also drew attention to the collection's strong sense of placemaking as a "as an exploration of personal and national identity, the uncanny yet familiar, and feminist themes that are forceful without ever being presumptuous." Joanne Hillhouse writing in Wadadli Pen commented on Millar's originality: "She is a Trinidad writer who eschews Port of Spain and the more familiar geographic, ethnic, and emotional landscapes of the land and the literature for something...not as easily categorized".

Speaking about her literary influences, Millar has said: "I am influenced by what I read. I went to university in Canada and read lots of early Margaret Atwood, Margaret Lawrence, Alice Munro. Also Doris Lessing, Nadine Gordimer, and I love Bessie Head and Ben Okri. […] I'm still reading and learning the Caribbean canon, an intimidating and essential one. Sir Vidia Naipaul, Earl Lovelace, C. L. R. James, Sam Selvon, Derek Walcott, and too many others to list here, have set a very high bar."

In interview with Karin Cecile Davidson in July 2013, Millar spoke about her sensitivity towards writing into a Caribbean space as a white, middle-class woman: "The Caribbean canon is young and is naturally, very politically charged with issues of ethnicity and identity. Migration and displacement are constant themes as are oppression, power, and authenticity. For a long time I couldn't write because I couldn't see how I could bring anything to the canon. I simply couldn't find a voice within that context. Now that I am older, I can see my way in, which is empowering. I can only write the story I know." She also noted the importance of writing in relation to complicated and fraught questions of Caribbean identity, "I really believe in the power of the story to help us see ourselves."

Similar issues are explored in her 2013 interview with Janine Mendes-Franco for Global Voices, and a more in-depth discussion of whiteness and Caribbean identity can be found in Millar's contribution to Annalee Davis's White Creole Conversations. Millar has also responded to Ten Questions on Caribbean Literary Heritage.

== Awards and recognition ==
In 2012, Millar was one of the NGC Bocas Lit Fest's New Talent Showcase writers, and in the same year, her short story "Friends" was shortlisted for the Commonwealth Short Story Prize and she was nominated for the AWP Intro-Journal Award. That same year, she won first prize in the Short Fiction category of the Small Axe Literary Competition for ‘The Dragonfly’s Tale’.

In 2013, she was awarded the 2013 Commonwealth Short Story Prize for "The Whale House". In the same year, she was nominated for the Hollick Arvon Caribbean Writer's Prize for fiction.

In 2015, her article "Mermen Come Calling", which was published in The New York Times, won a CTO Travel Media Award.

In 2016, her collection The Whale House and other stories was longlisted for the OCM Bocas Prize for Caribbean Literature in the fiction category.

== Bibliography ==
=== Short stories ===
- "Earl Grey" (Draconian Switch, Issue 20, May 2013)
- "The Whale House" (Granta, May 2013)
- "The Dragonfly's Tale" (Small Axe, Volume 17, Number 2, July 2013 (No. 41), pp. 223–236)
- "Making Guava Jelly" (The Manchester Review, Issue 13, December 2014)
- "Ilyeana" (Akashic Books, August 2015)
- "The Word Blanket" (WomanSpeak, Volume 8, 2016, pp. 110–112)
- "Lettuce" (Susumba's Book Bag, Issue 8, July 2016, pp. 6–11)
- "Peacock" (Adda, August 2016)
- "Bell Mouth Guns" (Sliver of Stone Magazine, October 2016)
- "Curry Duck" (PREE, Issue One, 2018)
- "Little Grasshopper" (Griffith Review 59: New Commonwealth Now, 2018)

=== Collections ===
- The Whale House and other stories (Peepal Tree Press, 2015, ISBN 9781845232498)
