= Mary Rokonadravu =

Fijian writer

- Occupation: Story writer
- Notable work: Famished Eels (short story): The Nightwatch (short story)
- Awards: Commonwealth Short Story Prize (2015) & (2022)

Mary Rokonadravu is a story writer from Fiji. She was the first Fijian to win the Pacific regional Commonwealth Short Story Prize twice in 2015 and 2022.

== Career ==
Rokonadravu was the first Fijian to win the Pacific regional Commonwealth Short Story Prize for her short story "Famished Eels" in 2015. She was also shortlisted for the same award in 2017.

She has directed a prison writing programme at Suva's seven correctional facilities for four years and in 2008, she published shedding Silences, the Pacific's first anthology of prison writing. In 2017, Rokonadravu launched a writing competition under the banner of the Fiji Media Watch Group.

Rokonadravu was again awarded with the Commonwealth Short Story Prize for her story The Nightwatch in 2022.

== Awards ==
Year	Work	Title	Result	Ref.
2015	"Famished Eels"	Commonwealth Short Story Prize	Won	
2017	"The Big, Insignificant History of Peter Abraham Stanhope"	Commonwealth Short Story Prize	Nominated	
2022	"The Nightwatch"	Commonwealth Short Story Prize	Won	

== Bibliography ==
=== Short stories ===
- "Famished Eels" — A short story narrating inter-family and regional relations.
- "Sepia"

== See also ==
- Fijian literature
