= Commonwealth Short Story Prize =

Annual literary award for unpublished short fiction

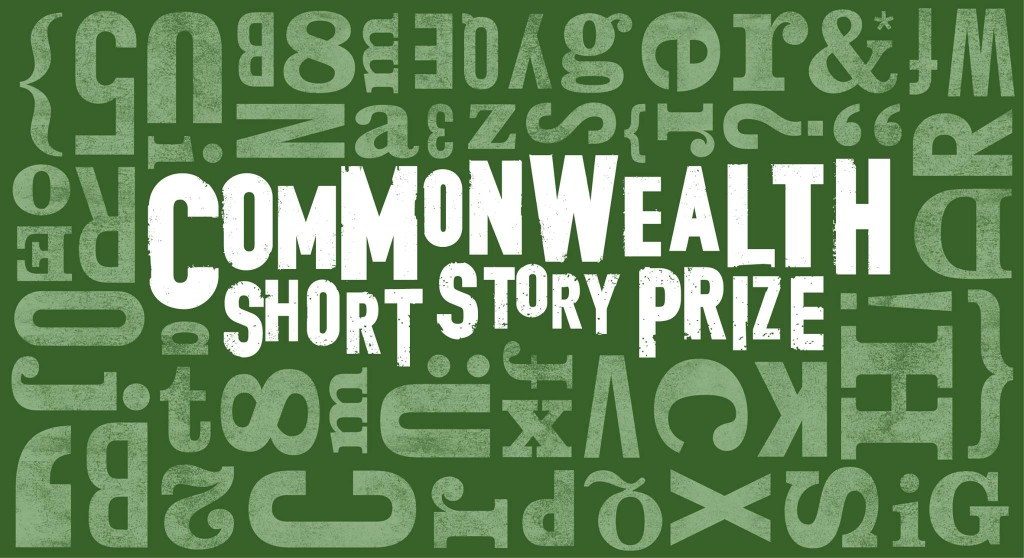
- Awarded for: Best piece of unpublished short fiction (2,000 – 5,000 words)
- Location: Commonwealth countries
- Presented by: Commonwealth Writers
- First award: 2012; 14 years ago
- Website: commonwealthfoundation.com/short-story-prize

The Commonwealth Short Story Prize is awarded annually for the best piece of unpublished short fiction (2,000 to 5,000 words). The prize is open to citizens of member states of the Commonwealth of Nations aged 18 and over. The Commonwealth Short Story Prize is managed by the Commonwealth Foundation, and was set up in 2012 to inspire, develop and connect writers and storytellers across the Commonwealth. The Prize replaced the Commonwealth Short Story Competition, a roughly similar competition that existed from 1996 to 2011 and was discontinued by the Commonwealth Foundation, along with the Commonwealth Writers' Prize.

The Prize is open to writers who have had little or no work published and particularly aimed at those places with little or no publishing industry. The prize aims to bring writing from these countries to the attention of an international audience. The stories need to be in English, but can be translated from other languages.

The overall winner receives £5,000 and the regional winner £2,500. During 2012–13, the regional winner received £1,000. Starting in 2014, the award for regional winners of the Short Story Prize was increased to £2,500. At the same time, Commonwealth Writers discontinued the Commonwealth Book Prize and focused solely on the Short Story Prize.

The 2026 Prize drew controversy for its selection of writings that are alleged to be partially or entirely AI generated, particularly the short story "The Serpent in the Grove" by Jamir Nazir of Trinidad and Tobago. The Commonwealth Foundation stated that its review had found that AI had not been used to write the winning stories.

== Commonwealth Foundation ==
Commonwealth Writers is the cultural programme of the Commonwealth Foundation. The Commonwealth Foundation is an intergovernmental organisation established in 1965, resourced by and reporting to Commonwealth governments, and guided by Commonwealth values and priorities.

== Winners ==
Regional winners and overall winners.

Year	Region	Author	Title	Country
2012	Africa	Jekwu Anyaegbuna	"Morrison Okoli (1955–2010)"	Nigeria
2012	Asia	Anushka Jasraj	"Radio Story"	India
2012	Canada and Europe	Andrea Mullaney	"The Ghost Marriage"	United Kingdom
2012	Caribbean	Diana McCaulay	"The Dolphin Catcher"	Jamaica
2012	Pacific	Emma Martin	"Two Girls in a Boat"	New Zealand
2013 (joint winners)	Africa	Julian Jackson	"The New Customers"	South Africa
2013 (joint winners)	Asia	Michael Mendis	"The Sarong-Man in the Old House, and an Incubus for a Rainy Night"	Sri Lanka
2013 (joint winners)	Canada and Europe	Eliza Robertson	"We Walked on Water"	Canada
2013 (joint winners)	Caribbean	Sharon Millar	"The Whale House"	Trinidad and Tobago
2013 (joint winners)	Pacific	Zoë Meager	"Things with Faces"	New Zealand
2014	Africa	Jennifer Nansubuga Makumbi	"Let's Tell This Story Properly"	Uganda
2014	Asia	Sara Adam Ang	"A Day in the Death"	Singapore
2014	Canada and Europe	Lucy Caldwell	"Killing Time"	United Kingdom
2014	Caribbean	Maggie Harris	"Sending for Chantal"	Guyana
2014	Pacific	Lucy Treloar	"The Dog and the Sea"	Australia
2015	Africa	Lesley Nneka Arimah	"Light"	Nigeria
2015	Asia	Siddhartha Gigoo	"The Umbrella Man"	India
2015	Canada and Europe	Jonathan Tel	"The Human Phonograph"	United Kingdom
2015	Caribbean	Kevin Jared Hosein	"The King of Settlement 4"	Trinidad and Tobago
2015	Pacific	Mary Rokonadravu	"Famished Eels"	Fiji
2016	Africa	Faraaz Mahomed	"The Pigeon"	South Africa
2016	Asia	Parashar Kulkarni	"Cow and Company"	India
2016	Canada and Europe	Stephanie Seddon	"Eel"	United Kingdom
2016	Caribbean	Lance Dowrich	"Ethelbert and the Free Cheese"	Trinidad and Tobago
2016	Pacific	Tina Makereti	"Black Milk"	New Zealand
2017	Africa	Akwaeke Emezi	"Who Is Like God"	Nigeria
2017	Asia	Anushka Jasraj	"Drawing Lessons"	India
2017	Canada and Europe	Tracy Fells	"The Naming of Moths"	United Kingdom
2017	Caribbean	Ingrid Persaud	"The Sweet Sop"	Trinidad and Tobago
2017	Pacific	Nat Newman	"The Death of Margaret Roe"	Australia
2018	Africa	Efua Traoré	"True Happiness"	Nigeria
2018	Asia	Sagnik Datta	"The Divine Pregnancy of a Twelve-Year-Old Girl"	India
2018	Canada and Europe	Lynda Clark	"Ghillie's Mum"	United Kingdom
2018	Caribbean	Kevin Jared Hosein	"Passage"	Trinidad and Tobago
2018	Pacific	Jenny Bennett-Tuionetoa	"Matalasi"	Samoa
2019	Africa	Mbozi Haimbe	"Madam’s Sister"	Zambia
2019	Asia	Saras Manickam	"My Mother Pattu"	Malaysia
2019	Canada and Europe	Constantia Soteriou	"Death Customs"	Cyprus
2019	Caribbean	Alexia Tolas	"Granma's Porch"	Bahamas
2019	Pacific	Harley Hern	"Screaming"	New Zealand
2020	Africa	Innocent Chizaram Ilo	"When a Woman Renounces Motherhood"	Nigeria
2020	Asia	Kritika Pandey	"The Great Indian Tee and Snakes"	India
2020	Canada and Europe	Reyah Martin	"Wherever Mister Jensen Went"	United Kingdom
2020	Caribbean	Brian S. Heap	"Mafootoo"	Jamaica
2020	Pacific	Andrea E. Macleod	"The Art of Waving"	Australia
2021	Africa	Rémy Ngamije	"Granddaughter of the Octopus"	Namibia
2021	Asia	Kanya D'Almeida	"I Cleaned The"	Sri Lanka
2021	Canada and Europe	Carol Farrelly	"Turnstones"	United Kingdom
2021	Caribbean	Roland Watson-Grant	"The Disappearance of Mumma Del"	Jamaica
2021	Pacific	Katerina Gibson	"Fertile Soil"	Australia
2022	Africa	Ntsika Kota	"and the earth drank deep"	Eswatini
2022	Asia	Sofia Mariah Ma	"The Last Diver on Earth"	Singapore
2022	Canada and Europe	Cecil Browne	"A Hat for Lemer"	United Kingdom/St Vincent and the Grenadines
2022	Caribbean	Diana McCaulay	"Bridge over the Yallahs River"	Jamaica
2022	Pacific	Mary Rokonadravu	"The Nightwatch"	Fiji
2023	Africa	Hana Gammon	"The Undertaker’s Apprentice"	South Africa
2023	Asia	Agnes Chew	"Oceans Away from My Homeland"	Singapore
2023	Canada and Europe	Rue Baldry	"Lech, Prince, and the Nice Things"	United Kingdom
2023	Caribbean	Kwame McPherson	"Ocoee"	Jamaica
2023	Pacific	Himali McInnes	"Kilinochchi"	New Zealand
2024	Africa	Reena Usha Rungoo	"Dite"	Mauritius
2024	Asia	Sanjana Thakur	"Aishwarya Rai"	India
2024	Canada and Europe	Julie Bouchard (Arielle Aaronson, translator)	"What Burns"	Canada
2024	Caribbean	Portia Subran	"The Devil's Son"	Trinidad and Tobago
2024	Pacific	Pip Robertson	"A River Then the Road"	Aotearoa New Zealand
2025	Africa	Joshua Lubwama	"Mothers Not Appearing in Search"	Uganda
2025	Asia	Faria Basher	"An Eye and a Leg"	Bangladesh
2025	Canada and Europe	Chanel Sutherland	"Descend"	Canada
2025	Caribbean	Subraj Singh	"Margot's Run"	Guyana
2025	Pacific	Kathleen Ridgwell	"Crab Sticks and Lobster Rolls"	Australia
2026	Africa	Lisa-Anne Julien	"Me and Ma'am"	South Africa
2026	Asia	Sharon Aruparayil	"Mehendi Nights"	India
2026	Canada and Europe	John Edward DeMicoli	"The Bastion's Shadow"	Malta
2026	Caribbean	Jamir Nazir	"The Serpent in the Grove"	Trinidad and Tobago
2026	Pacific	Holly Ann Miller	"Second Skin"	New Zealand

== Judges ==
Each year the judging panel comprises a chair, as well as one representative each from the five regions matching the prize's regional awards: Africa, Asia, Canada and Europe, the Caribbean, and the Pacific.

In 2022 the judges were Fred D'Aguiar (Chair), Louise Umutoni-Bower (Africa), Jahnavi Barua (Asia), Stephanos Stephanides (Canada and Europe), Kevin Jared Hosein (Caribbean), and Jeanine Leane (Pacific).

In 2023 the judges were Bilal Tanweer (Chair), Rémy Ngamije (Africa), Ameena Hussein (Asia), Katrina Best (Canada and Europe), Mac Donald Dixon (Caribbean), and Selina Tusitala Marsh (Pacific).

In 2024 the judges were Jennifer Nansubuga Makumbi (Chair), Keletso Mopai (Africa), O Thiam Chin (Asia), Shashi Bhat (Canada and Europe), Richard Georges (Caribbean), and Melissa Lucashenko (Pacific).

The 2026 judges were Louise Doughty (chair), Fred Khumalo (Africa), Rifat Munim (Asia), Norma Dunning (Canada and Europe), Sharma Taylor (Caribbean), and Maxine Beneba Clarke (Pacific).

== See also ==
- Commonwealth Foundation prizes
