= Cecil Brown (Hawaii politician) =

American attorney, politician, businessman, and banker

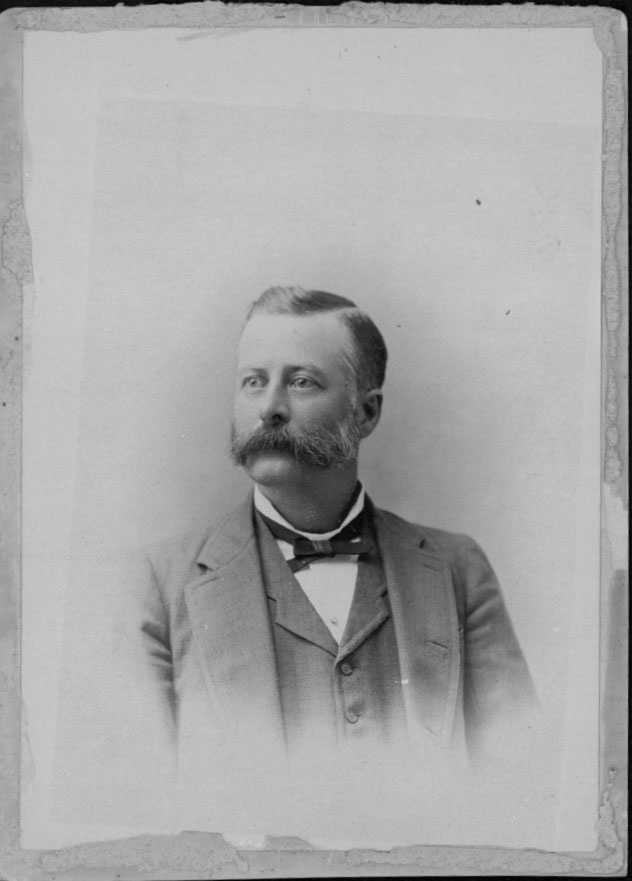

Territory of Hawaii Senate
- In office 1910–1913
- In office 1898–1904

Republic of Hawaii Senate
- In office 1895–1898

Provisional Government of Hawaii Advisory Council
- In office January 25, 1893 – October 25, 1894

Kingdom of Hawaii Attorney General
- In office November 8, 1892 – January 12, 1893
- Monarch: Liliuokalani
- Preceded by: Charles F. Creighton
- Succeeded by: Arthur P. Peterson

Kingdom of Hawaii House of Representatives
- In office February 11, 1884 – November 1892

Kingdom of Hawaii Deputy Attorney General
- In office 1878–1880

Kingdom of Hawaii House of Representatives
- In office 1876–1878

Personal details
- Born: October 9, 1850 Wailua, Hawaiian Kingdom
- Died: March 6, 1917 (aged 66) Honolulu, Territory of Hawaii
- Spouse: Mary Kameʻeleihiwa Dickson
- Occupation: Lawyer, Politician, Banker
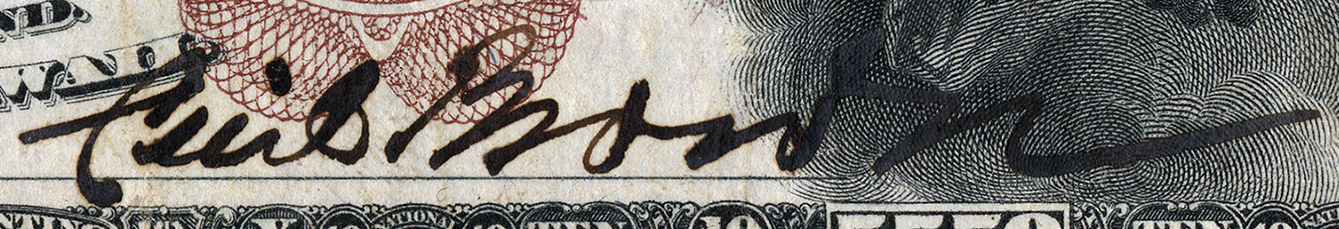
- Signature

Cecil Brown (October 9, 1850 – March 6, 1917) was an American attorney, politician, businessman, and banker in the Kingdom, Republic, and Territory of Hawaii.

Brown served as a member of the Kingdom of Hawaii House of Representatives, Deputy Attorney General, and Attorney General. He served on the Advisory Council for the Provisional Government of Hawaii, the Council of State for the Republic of Hawaii, and in the Senate of both the Republic and Territory of Hawaii. Brown had diverse investments, was a director or officer of several sugar companies, and Vice-President of the Hawaiian Bell and Mutual Telephone Company when service to the Hawaiian Islands was being developed. Brown was also the founding president of the first national bank chartered in Hawaii.

== Background ==
Brown was born in Wailua, Hawaii, to Thomas and Mary Ann (Rhodes) Brown who moved to the Hawaiian Islands from England in 1844. He was the fifth of six siblings (who survived infancy), two of whom were also involved in Hawaiian politics: Godfrey (Minister of Foreign Affairs, then Minister of Finance for the Kingdom of Hawaii) and Frank (House of Representatives, Kingdom of Hawaii). Louis (died in infancy), Cecil, and Malcolm were born in Hawaii. In 1853, the entire family left for Boston to put Arthur, Godfrey, and Frank in school. The remaining members of the Brown family returned to Hawaii at the very end of 1855.

=== Early life ===
Cecil was homeschooled by his parents and educated by his maternal aunt Sarah Rhodes Von Pfister. He attended the Cathedral Grammar School followed by the Punahou School. In December 1866 Brown left Honolulu for the United States, and enrolled in Columbian Law School (Washington D.C.). He graduated with honors in June 1871, and moved to New York City where he was employed by the law firm of Evarts, Southmayd, and Choate. In 1874, Brown moved to San Francisco before returning to Honolulu.

Shortly after his return to Hawaii, Brown was licensed to practice law before the Supreme Court of the Kingdom of Hawaii on January 28, 1875. He was appointed a notary public for Oahu on July 27, 1875, by King Kalākaua. Starting a private practice, he was representing clients in circuit court by the end of 1875, and in the Supreme Court of the Kingdom of Hawaii by 1876. Despite his future political and business careers, Brown continued the private practice of law (mainly probate) for the duration of his life. On at least eight occasions between 1893 and 1901, Brown sat on the bench of the Supreme Court of Hawaii as an Acting Justice. (Note: In Re Estate of J.F.O. Banning, 9 Haw. Rep. 357, 357 (Hawaii Supreme Court 1893) ("Cecil Brown, Esq., Acting Justice .")., Carter v. Mutual Life Insurance Company, 10 Haw. Rep. 117 (Hawaii Supreme Court 1895)., Carter v. Mutual Life Insurance Company, 10 Haw. Rep. 562 (Hawaii Supreme Court 1896)., McGrew v. McGrew, 10 Haw. Rep. 600 (Hawaii Supreme Court 1897)., Carter v. Manhattan Life Insurance Company, 11 Haw. Rep. 69 (Hawaii Supreme Court 1897)., Wilder's Steamship Company v. The Brigantine Lurline, 11 Haw. Rep. 83 (Hawaii Supreme Court 1897)., Hyde et al. v Smith, 11 Haw. Rep. 535 (Hawaii Supreme Court 1898)., Kaimana v Kamanu, 11 Haw. Rep. 767 (Hawaii Supreme Court 1899)., "Brown on the Bench". The Hawaiian Star. November 14, 1901. p. 1 – via Newspapers.com.)

Brown married Mary Kameʻeleihiwa Miner Dickson (widow of Menzies Dickson) on August 11, 1897. They had no children together. She died on September 12, 1907.

== Political career ==
Cecil Brown's political career spanned nearly 40 years (1876–1913). He was engaged in politics under four constitutions of the Kingdom of Hawaii prior to annexation by the United States: 1840, 1852, 1864, and 1887, and a constitution for the Republic of Hawaii (of which Brown was one of the framers) that was adopted on July 4, 1894. The last three constitutions (1864, 1887, and 1894) were each in effect at some point during Cecil Brown's career in public service. (Note: The 1864 Constitution changed the structure of the Legislative Assembly of the kingdom of Hawaii from bicameral to unicameral. Representatives, previously elected annually, were elected biennially. The number of Representatives (a minimum of 24 and maximum of 40) did not change. Nobles, still appointed by the King for life (or to serve at his pleasure), were reduced in number from a maximum of 30 (1852) to 20 (1864). The 1887 Constitution returned the Legislative Assembly to a bicameral model. The most significant change in the legislature was the requirement for Nobles to be elected for six-year terms. The 1894 Constitution of the Republic of Hawaii continued a bicameral legislature, with the first session of the new legislature to occur in February 1896. The first general elections (to take place biennially thereafter) would take place in September 1897. The Senate and House of Representative each had 15 members. Under the new constitution, Senators currently serving or newly elected served until the second general election in September 1899. The first set of new senators were elected for 2, 4, or 6 year terms. Subsequent elections would be for six-year terms. Representatives elected after the ratification of the new constitution served until the first general election, and then were up for re-election biennially. It was also forbidden for any legislator to hold another government office (with the exception of the cabinet and Council of State), this included notaries and appointed agent for the government.)

=== Kingdom of Hawaii ===
On September 5, 1876, Representative Samuel Kamakau died in office. A special election to fill the remainder of his term was held September 18, 1876, and Brown was elected. His bid for re-election in February 1878 was close but unsuccessful. (Note: Out of 11 candidates running for office, only the top four were elected. Brown came in fifth.)

In July 1878, Brown was appointed the clerk to the Attorney General. By November of the same year, legal announcements published in the local newspapers referenced him as the Deputy Attorney General. He was listed in the Kingdom's directory for 1880 as Deputy Attorney General, the first use of the title in an official directory. (Note: Brown was the inaugural office holder of Deputy Attorney General through 1880. The title was not in use again until 1888.)

Brown carried several government appointments. In addition to notary public, he was appointed in 1877 to a three-person Board of Appraisers of Lands, and in 1879 as an Agent to Take Acknowledgments to Instruments. (Note: Responsibilities and qualifications very similar to that of a notary public.) He would resign all three appointments in 1887 to be in compliance with the 1887 Constitution of the Kingdom of Hawaii.

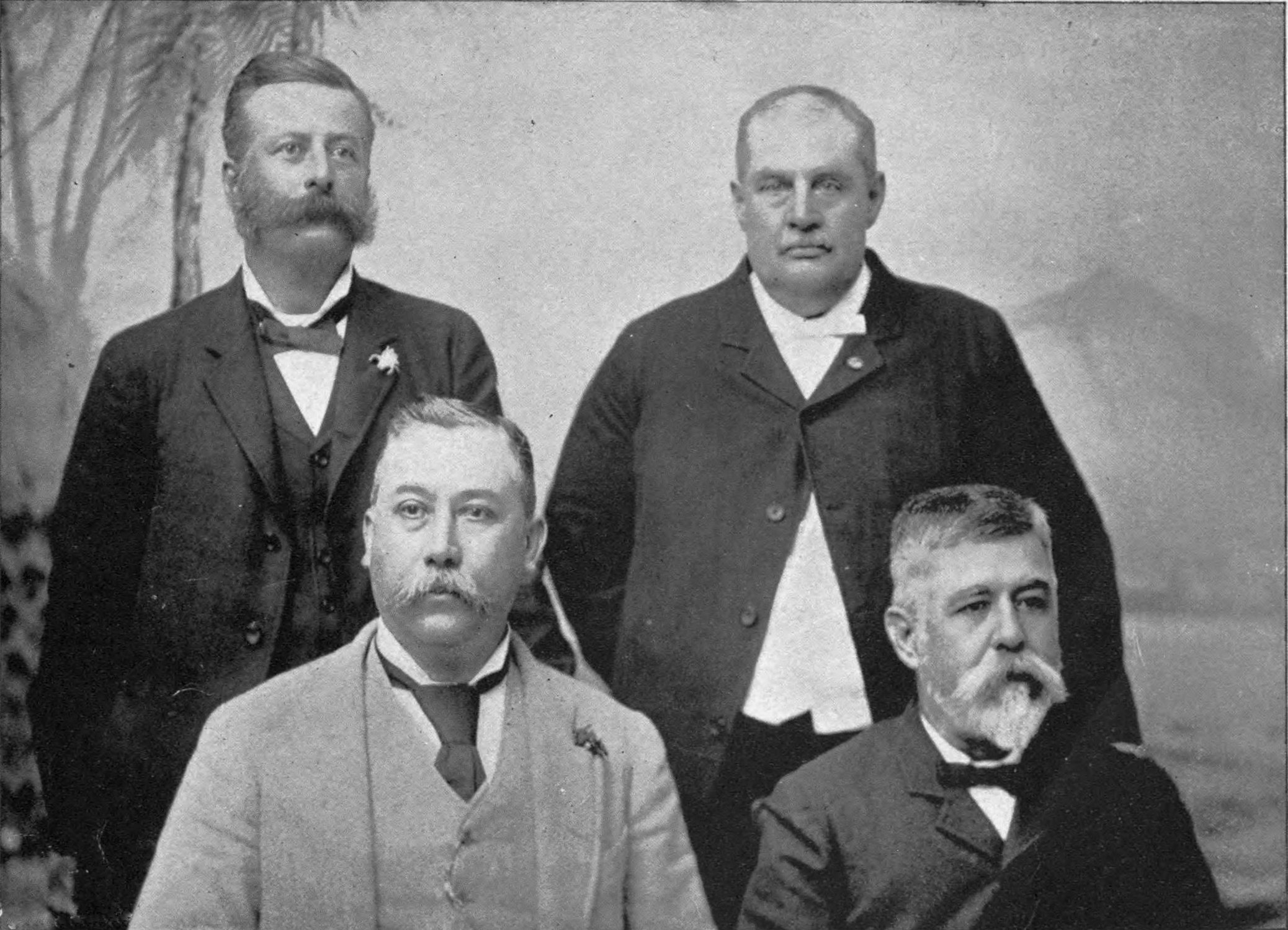
Kingdom of Hawaii Cabinet, November 1892. Brown is top left

In February 1884, Cecil Brown and his brothers Godfrey and Frank were elected to the Legislative Assembly's House of Representatives. Cecil proposed, passed, and had signed into law the first bill of the legislative session, named the "Turkey Law". Brown was re-elected in 1886, 1888 and appointed Chair of the Judiciary Committee, and 1890.

While planning to run for a vacant seat in the House of Nobles, Brown was appointed Attorney General of the Kingdom of Hawaii in the newly formed cabinet of Queen Liliuokalani in November 1892. The cabinet was disbanded on January 12, 1893 and on January 17 a coup d'état resulted in the overthrow of the Kingdom of Hawaii.

=== Provisional Government of Hawaii ===
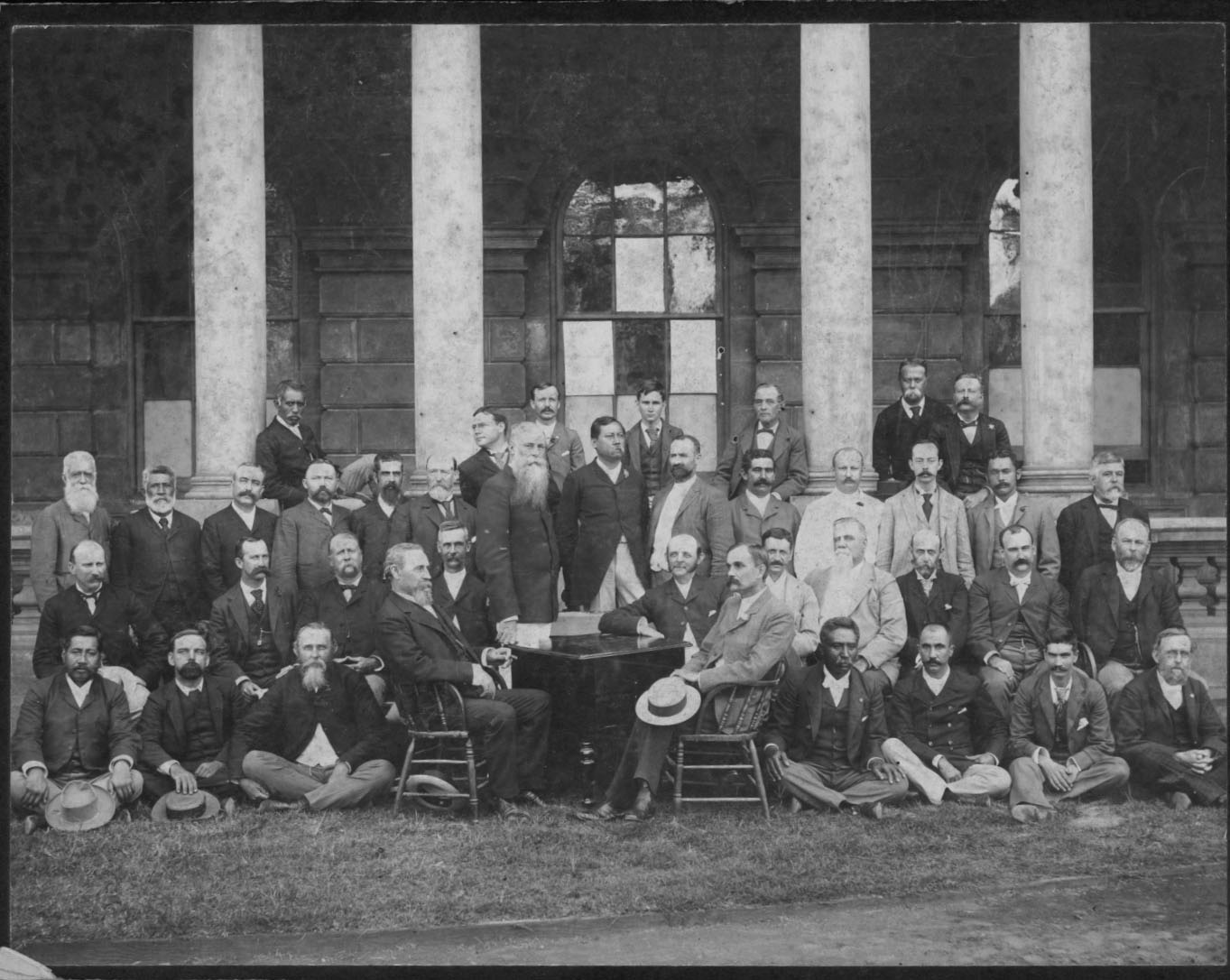
Constitutional Convention members (1894). Brown is top row, last on right

The Provisional Government of Hawaii established an Advisory Council vested with legislative powers. Brown was appointed on January 25, 1893 after declining an appointment as Attorney General, made on January 16, the evening before the overthrow. On March 20, 1893, he was appointed Commissioner of a three-person committee tasked with the revision of the Hawaiian penal code, and was appointed chair of the Judiciary Committee. An act calling for a constitutional convention (to which Brown was a delegate) was passed on March 15, 1894, and convened from May 30 to July 3, 1894. Brown was one of the signers of the 1894 constitution of the newly formed Republic of Hawaii.

=== Republic of Hawaii ===
Brown resigned from the Advisory Council on October 25, 1894 to run for the Senate. He was elected in November 1894 and served continuously through 1904. During his tenure in the Senate, Brown served on the Council of State from June 23, 1895 through 1901, and on the Senate Judiciary, Coinage, and Foreign Relations committees. In November 1904, though nominated, Brown was not re-elected. There was talk of Brown running again in the general elections of 1906 and 1908, but in 1910 he was re-elected. Cecil Brown effectively retired from the Senate in May 1914.

== Business career ==
=== Boards of directors ===
Cecil Brown sat on multiple association and business boards as trustee, director, or officer. Beginning in the early 1880s, Brown was a director of the Stock Breeders' Association, Treasurer of the Kapiolani Park Association, and the Hawaiian Jockey Club.

His business interests included the Hawaiian Hardware Company (Vice-President), Honolulu Soap Works company, Ltd. (President), the California Feed Company, Ltd. (President), and the Hawaiian Fibre Company, Limited (President). His sugar interests included the Kona Sugar Company, Ookala Sugar Plantation Co., and Pacific Sugar Mill (Vice-president).

=== Telephone service in Hawaii ===
Hawaiian Bell Telephone Company (HBT) incorporated in 1879, and began service on December 30, 1880. In August 1883, Mutual Telephone Company was founded as a competitor and began operations in March 1885. On August 2, 1894, the two companies consolidated with Mutual Telephone in control.

Cecil and brother Godfrey were elected to the board of directors of HBT in early 1884 (Godfrey as vice-president and Cecil as auditor), and by the end of the year, Godfrey had become president. By January 1886, Godfrey was both President and Treasurer, and Cecil Vice-President, positions they would hold for the next several years.

In September 1892, Cecil was also elected to the board of directors of rival company Mutual Telephone. When the two companies merged in 1894, he was named Vice-President of Mutual Telephone Company, and two years later Godfrey was elected Treasurer. Cecil remained Vice-President for over a decade.

=== The First National Bank of Hawaii ===
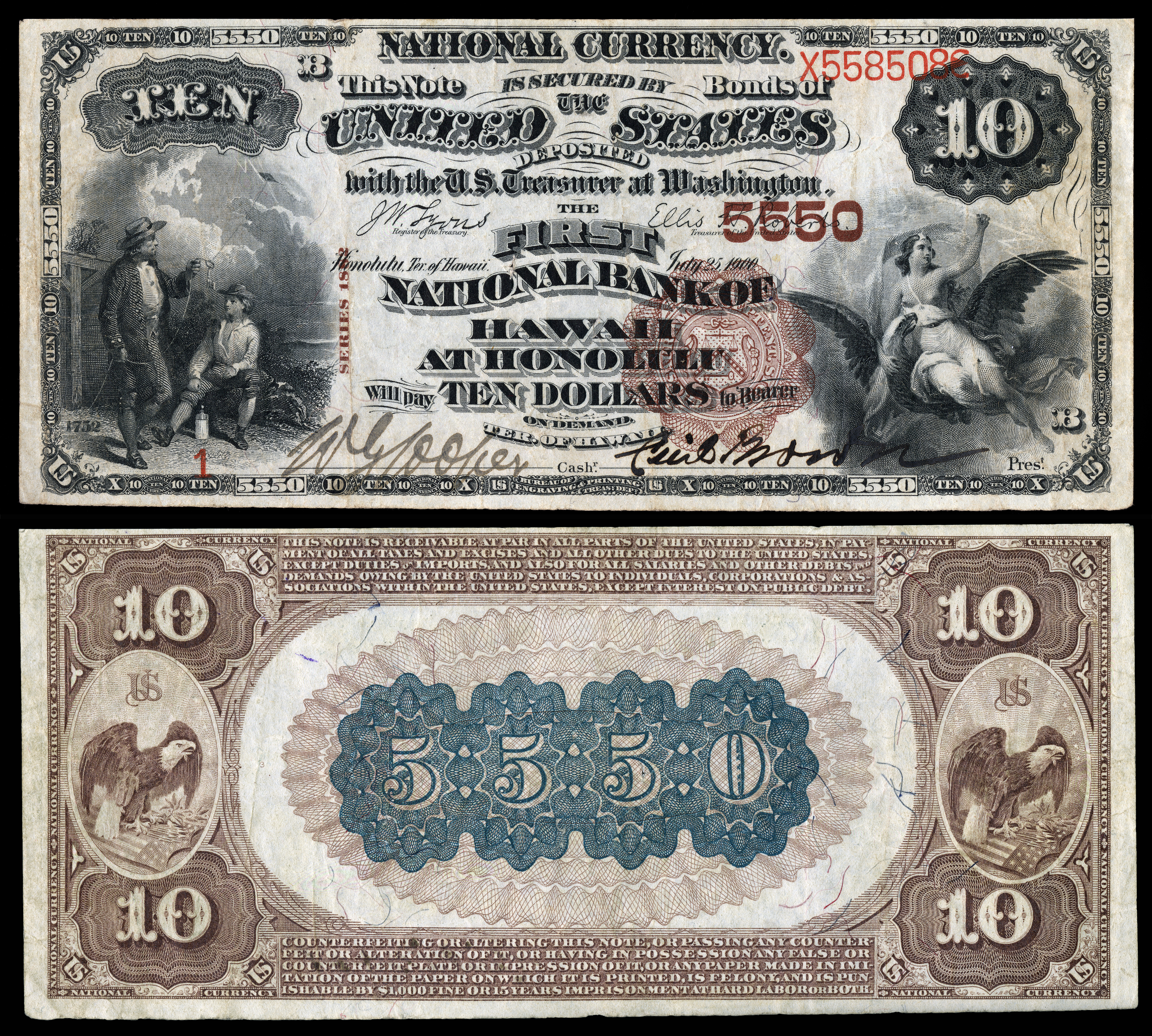
The first $10 National Bank Note issued by The First National Bank of Hawaii at Honolulu, Territory of Hawaii (1900). Signed by Cecil Brown (President) and W.G. Cooper (Cashier)

Anticipating the annexation of Hawaii as a US territory (July 1898), and the expected adoption of the National Banking Act, by the beginning of 1898 several parties had already sent requests to Washington, D.C., to reserve the title "The First National Bank of Hawaii". Brown served as attorney to George Macfarlane during the organization and incorporation of the First American Bank of Hawaii during 1899. The bank organizers anticipated that having a fully functioning bank in place when the National Banking Act was extended to include the Territory of Hawaii would allow them to then become The First National Bank of Hawaii. At the first stockholders meeting in September 1899, Cecil Brown was elected president.

Congress eventually extended the National Banking Act to include the Territory of Hawaii (April 30, 1900), and during a July 1900 stockholders meeting, it was agreed to convert the First American Bank into a national bank. The First National Bank of Hawaii at Honolulu opened for business on October 1, 1900. Brown remained president of the bank until 1915, when he stepped down and became chairman of the board.

== Declining health and death ==
In the summer of 1914, while visiting San Francisco, Brown's health began to deteriorate. After a two and a half month illness he was hospitalized when he suffered a "severe" stroke and was reported in "serious condition". He arrived in Hawaii on November 4, 1914 and suffered a second stroke on March 4, 1915, leaving his right side partially paralyzed. He was reported to be in "critical" condition. Although it was initially reported that Brown's condition was slowly improving, by the end of 1916 his functioning had significantly deteriorated, (Note: A suit filed in November 1916 to remove Brown as a trustee of the Lanai Company stated he was "incapable of understanding or attending to any business, is unable to speak, read and write and is wholly incapable of carrying out the object and the understanding of his trust agreement…") and in late December 1916 the courts declared him to be "mentally non-competent", and appointed his nephew H.M. von Holt as his guardian. On March 6, 1917, Cecil Brown died of apoplexy. The following day the Territorial Senate, House, and Hawaiian Bar Association issued resolutions expressing condolences and loss.
