= Cecil Brown (cricketer) =

English cricketer

Cecil Leonard Morley Brown (16 July 1895 – 6 December 1955) was an English cricketer active from 1920 to 1926 who played for Leicestershire. He was born in Melton Mowbray and died in Crowthorne. He appeared in seven first-class matches as a righthanded batsman who scored 74 runs with a highest score of 33.
