= Kintu (novel) =

2014 novel by Jennifer Makumbi

- First edition
- Author: Jennifer Nansubuga Makumbi
- Language: English
- Publisher: Kwani Trust, Nairobi, Kenya
- Publication date: 2014
- Publication place: Uganda
- Media type: Print (hardback and paperback)
- Pages: 442
- Award: Kwani? Manuscript Project, 2013
- ISBN: 978-9966-1598-9-2

Kintu is a 2014 novel by Ugandan author Jennifer Nansubuga Makumbi. It was her doctoral novel, initially titled The Kintu Saga. It was shortlisted and won the Kwani? Manuscript Project in 2013. It was published by Kwani Trust in 2014 under the title Kintu.

Kintu is based on the Baganda history and focuses on generational curses, transgression, Baganda mythology and sexism that is engraved underneath each chapter of the book.

== Plot ==
In 1750, Kintu Kidda, Ppookino (governor) of Buddu Province, in the kingdom of Buganda, sets out on a journey to the capital where he is to pledge allegiance to the new kabaka of the realm. Along the way, a rash action in a moment of anger unleashes a curse that will plague his family for generations. Time passes and the nation of Uganda is born. Through colonial occupation and the turbulent early years of independence, Kintu’s heirs survive the loss of their land, the denigration of their culture and the ravages of war. But the story of their ancestor and his twin wives Nnakato and Babirye endures. So too does the curse. Kintu’s descendants seek to break the burden of the curse and to reconcile the inheritance of tradition and the modern world that is their future. The novel explores the power of a curse in African society and the myth and power that surrounds twins. It describes how the princes of Buganda fought and killed one another for the throne and the role of the Queen Mothers in this power play.

The book starts with a prologue about Kamu Kintu, who is brutally murdered by a mob in Bwaise, a suburb of Kampala, at dawn, on Monday, 5 January 2004. The novel then takes you back to 1750, to the beginning of the curse in the old kingdom of Buganda. Kintu follows the misfortunes of the Kintu clan more than 250 years ago, blending Ganda oral tradition, forms of myth, folktale and history with biblical elements. The novel explores ideas of transgression, curse and perpetuity, looking back at the history of the Buganda kingdom and tracing the birth of modern Uganda.

== Awards and recognition ==
- Longlisted for the 2014 Etisalat Prize for Literature.
- Winner of the Kwani? Manuscript Project in 2013.
