= Cecil Browne (author) =

British and Vincentian writer (born 1957)

- Born: 1957 (age 68–69); St Vincent and the Grenadines
- Occupation: Author
- Notable work: A Hat for Lemer (short story)
- Awards: Commonwealth Short Story Prize for Canada and Europe, 2022

Cecil Browne (born 1957) is a British and Vincentian writer who won the 2022 Commonwealth Short Story Prize for Canada, UK and Europe.

== Biography ==
Browne was born in St Vincent and the Grenadines in 1957, in a village near Georgetown. In 1970, he moved to the United Kingdom to be with his parents. He has been a college lecturer in mathematics for his whole career, including ten years as Head of maths at Uxbridge College, a Further Education college in West London. He currently lives in High Wycombe.

== Writing ==
Browne has published three books. The first The Moon is Following Me, published in 2010, was a collection of short stories based around experiences of family life in a Caribbean village in the 1970s. The second, Feather Your Tingaling, published in 2012, was a collection of short stories inspired by characters from Caribbean folklore. His third book, and first novel, Cassie P Caribbean PI, was published in 2019. This introduces Cassie Providence, as the Caribbean's first female Private Investigator.

Several of Browne's short stories have been published in collections and anthologies. His story Coming Off the Long Run was published in 2018 in So Many Islands, an anthology of writing from the Caribbean, Mediterranean, Indian and Pacific Oceans gathered from works supported by the Commonwealth Writers.

In 2022, Browne's short story A Hat for Lemer won the Commonwealth Short Story Prize for Canada, UK and Europe. Competition judge Stephanos Stephanides commented that this was a striking and original story set in mid-19th century post-Emancipation St Vincent .. which provides a visceral understanding of a culture at a crucial point of social and historical transition. Browne was the first Vincentian winner of this prize.
