= Commonwealth Writers =

Commonwealth Short Story Prize
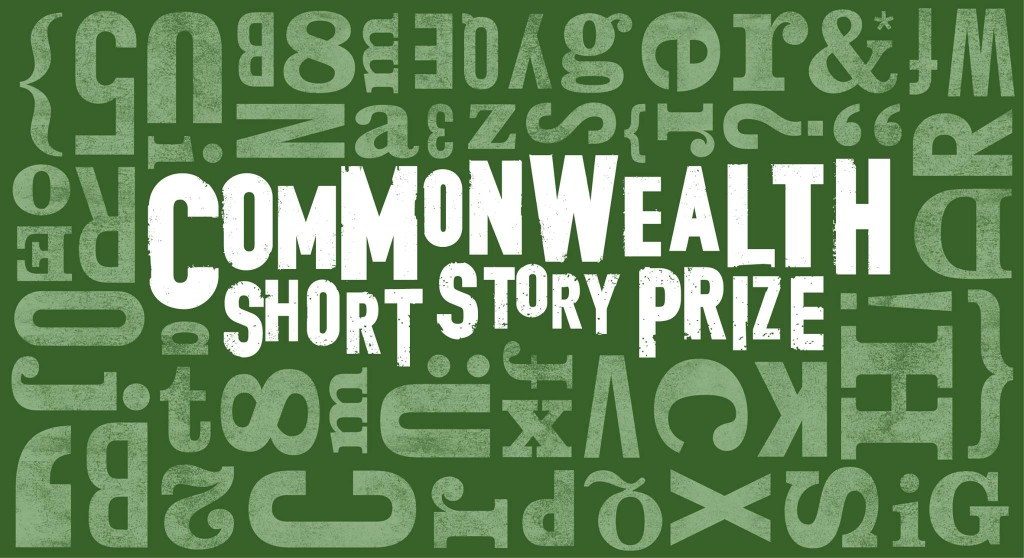
- Awarded for: Best piece of unpublished short fiction (2,000 - 5,000 words)
- Location: Commonwealth countries
- Presented by: Commonwealth Writers
- First award: 2012
- Website: www.commonwealthwriters.org

Commonwealth Writers (established in 2011) is the cultural initiative of the Commonwealth Foundation. It aims to inspire, develop and connect writers across the Commonwealth. Its flagship is a literary award for short stories, the Commonwealth Short Story Prize, and a website.

As the Commonwealth Foundation’s cultural programme, Commonwealth Writers works in partnership with international literary organisations, the wider cultural industries and civil society to help writers develop their craft. Partners include the BBC World Service, the British Council, English PEN, Granta, Hay Festival, the Prince Claus Fund, the Sigrid Rausing Trust, the Brunel University African Poetry Prize, and others.

== Short Story Prize ==
The Commonwealth Short Story Prize is awarded annually for the best piece of unpublished short fiction (2,000–5,000 words). Regional winners receive £2,500 and the overall winner receives £5,000. The prize is open to Commonwealth citizens aged 18 or over.

The Prize is open to writers who have had little or no work published and particularly aimed at those places with little or no publishing industry. The prize aims to bring writing from these countries to the attention of an international audience. The stories need to be in English, but can be translated from other languages.

== See also ==
- Commonwealth Foundation prizes
