= Lynda Clark (author) =

Author and creator of interactive fiction

- Born: 29 October 1981 (age 45); Nottingham, England
- Education: Nottingham Trent University
- Website: https://wouldyouliketochangethedifficultysetting.wordpress.com/

Lynda Clark (born 29 October 1981) is an author and creator of interactive fiction. Her short story "Ghillie's Mum" won the Commonwealth Short Story Prize for Europe and Canada in 2018, and was shortlisted for the BBC National Short Story Award in 2019. She is the author of two novels, Beyond Kidding (2019) and Strange Talk (2026), as well as a short story collection, Dreaming in Quantum and Other Stories (2021), all published by Fairlight Books.

== Biography ==
Born in Nottingham, Nottinghamshire, Clark holds a PhD in Creative Writing (with a focus on interactive narrative) from Nottingham Trent University. She has worked as a bookseller and in the video game industry as a writer and producer. Currently she is based in Fife, Scotland, and works as a Lecturer at Abertay University.

Clark has the rare neurological disorder spasmodic dysphonia, an incurable condition which affects speech.

== Awards and prize listings ==
- 2017 The Cambridge Short Story Prize (shortlist) for "Grandma's Feast Day"
- 2018 Regional winner, Commonwealth Short Story Prize for Europe and Canada for "Ghillie's Mum"
- 2019 BBC National Short Story Award (shortlist) for "Ghillie's Mum"
- 2019 New Media Writing Prize (shortlist) for "The Memory Archivist"
- 2019 Winner, BL Labs Artistic Award for "The Memory Archivist"
- 2020 Authors' Licensing and Collecting Society (ALCS) Tom-Gallon Trust Award (shortlist) for "Ghillie's Mum"
- 2026 Galley Beggar Press Short Story Prize (longlist) for "Head Babies"

== Works ==
=== Novels ===
- Beyond Kidding, 2019, Fairlight Books, ISBN 978-1912054848
- Strange Talk, 2026, Fairlight Books, ISBN 978-1914148842

=== Short stories ===
- Dreaming in Quantum and Other Stories, 2021, Fairlight Books, ISBN 978-1912054657

=== Interactive fiction ===
- The Memory Archivist, 2019

=== Non-fiction ===
- How I Ended the Wrestling Match Between My Brain and My Throat, 2013, The Guardian
- Why Final Fantasy 15’s beautiful food and ridiculous culinary preparation is the best thing in the game, 2017, Games Radar & Official XBox Magazine
- It's a Kind of Magic: The Tricks of Interactive Fiction, The Birmingham Journal of Literature and Language, VIII (2017), 55-65
- Before Westworld was Mudfog – Charles Dickens’ surprisingly modern dystopia, 2018, The Conversation & Smithsonian Magazine

== See also ==
- List of electronic literature authors, critics, and works
- Digital poetry
- E-book#History
- Electronic literature
- Hypertext fiction
- Interactive fiction
- Literatronica
