= C. A. Davids =

South African author (born 1971)

- Born: Carolann Davids; 1971 (age 54–55); Cape Town, South Africa
- Education: University of Cape Town
- Occupation: Novelist
- Writing career
- Language: English, Afrikaans
- Notable awards: University of Johannesburg Debut Prize shortlisted in 2013; Sunday Times Fiction Prize longlisted in 2013; Kwani? Manuscript Project longlisted in 2013; EU Literary Award shortlisted in 2012

Carolann "C. A." Davids (born 1971) is a South African writer and editor who is best known for her novels The Blacks of Cape Town (2013), How To Be A Revolutionary (2022), and her short stories.

== Career and philosophy ==
Born in 1971 in Cape Town, South Africa, Davids is a novelist, editor and writer. She previously worked in arts marketing as the marketing manager for the Baxter Theatre Centre at the University of Cape Town (UCT), and communications manager for the Alexander Kasser Theatre at Montclair State University in Montclair, New Jersey, USA. Before that, she worked as an advertising and promotions manager for Levi Strauss SA.

Davids has contributed to publications such as Lapham's Quarterly, the Johannesburg Review of Books, the South African Sunday Times and Wasafiri, and her writing has appeared in anthologies such as Twist, an anthology of short stories by South African women (published by Struik, October 2006) and in African Pens: New Writing from Southern Africa (published by New Africa Books, April 2007). Davids has lived in Switzerland, the United States of America and Shanghai, China, and now resides on the edge of District Six in Cape Town, South Africa. She graduated from the University of Cape Town (UCT) with an MA in creative writing.

Her debut novel The Blacks of Cape Town received a positive critical reception in 2013.

Davids is as strong advocate of South African literature:

I would love to see a concerted, co-ordinated effort from civil society, writers, publishers, government and nongovernmental organisations to alter our reading habits (and trajectory) and the space given to literature in our country. It can and has been done elsewhere … but we would need to work together and plan 20 years into the future.

== Recognition ==
Davids has been shortlisted for the University of Johannesburg Debut Prize 2013, longlisted for the Sunday Times Fiction Prize 2013; longlisted for the inaugural Kwani? Manuscript Project, and shortlisted for the EU Literary Award in 2012.

How To Be A Revolutionary won the prestigious Sunday Times Literary Award for best fiction in 2022.

== Personal life ==
Davids lives with her husband and two children in Cape Town, South Africa.

== Bibliography ==
=== Fiction ===
- The Blacks of Cape Town (Modjaji Books, 2013, ISBN 978-1-920590-38-3)
- How to be a Revolutionary (Verso Books, 2022, ISBN 9781839760877)

=== Short stories ===
- Short story in Twist (2006)
- "Nostalgia" in African Pens: New Writing from Southern Africa (2007)
