= Cecil Wyndham Browne =

Anglican priest in Ireland

Cecil Charles Wyndham Browne was an Anglican priest in Ireland, most notably Dean of Elphin and Ardagh from 1967 to 1983.

Browne was educated at Trinity College, Dublin and ordained deacon in 1940 and priest in 1941. After curacies in Portadown and Dublin he was the Rector of Sligo. In 1953 he became the Rural Dean of North Elphin; and Examining Chaplain to Edward Moore (Bishop of Kilmore, Elphin and Ardagh) in 1961.
