= Cecil Browne (ice hockey) =

Canadian ice hockey player

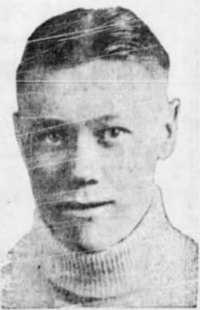
- Born: February 13, 1896; St. James, Manitoba, Canada
- Died: August 13, 1985 (aged 89)
- Height: 6 ft 0 in (183 cm)
- Weight: 165 lb (75 kg; 11 st 11 lb)
- Position: Left wing
- Shot: Left
- Played for: Winnipeg Hockey Club; Winnipeg Monarchs; Chicago Black Hawks
- Playing career: 1913–1934

Cecil James "Cece" Browne (February 13, 1896 – August 13, 1985) was a Canadian professional ice hockey left winger who was selected "Manitoba's Athlete of the Century" in 1970.

Born in Winnipeg, Manitoba, Browne played 13 games in the National Hockey League for the Chicago Black Hawks in the 1927–28 season, scoring two goals, before an injury sent him back home.

Browne also played baseball in Winnipeg with the Dominion Express team.

== Career statistics ==
=== Regular season and playoffs ===
			Regular season					Playoffs
Season	Team	League	GP	G	A	Pts	PIM	GP	G	A	Pts	PIM
1914–15	Winnipeg Strathconas	WJrHL	5	15	5	20	6	—	—	—	—	—
1915–16	Winnipeg Strathconas	WJrHL	6	12	4	16	8	—	—	—	—	—
1915–16	Winnipeg Monarchs	MHL	1	1	1	2	6	—	—	—	—	—
1916–17	Winnipeg Monarchs	MHL	8	9	6	15	4	—	—	—	—	—
1917–18	Winnipeg Vimy	MHL	10	7	9	16	10	—	—	—	—	—
1919–20	Moose Jaw Maple Leafs	SSHL	12	20	3	23	14	2	2	0	2	4
1920–21	Regina Victorias	SSHL	15	14	3	17	15	4	2	3	5	0
1921–22	Regina Victorias	SSHL	6	7	2	9	2	1	2	0	2	0
1921–22	Regina Victorias	Al-Cup	—	—	—	—	—	5	8	3	11	2
1922–23	Winnipegs	MHL	10	9	2	11	14	—	—	—	—	—
1923–24	Selkirk Fishermen	MHL	11	5	4	9	4	10	8	3	11	16
1924–25	Selkirk Fishermen	MHL	12	12	2	14	10	2	0	0	0	8
1925–26	Winnipeg Maroons	CHL	25	8	2	10	40	5	2	0	2	4
1926–27	Winnipeg Maroons	AHA	35	24	6	30	84	3	1	0	1	6
1927–28	Chicago Black Hawks	NHL	13	2	0	2	4	—	—	—	—	—
1928–29	Seattle Eskimos	PCHL	33	23	6	29	22	5	2	2	4	12
1929–30	Seattle Eskimos	PCHL	33	12	10	22	36	—	—	—	—	—
MHL totals			52	43	24	67	48	12	8	3	11	24
NHL totals			13	2	0	2	4	—	—	—	—	—

== Awards and achievements ==
- AHA Scoring Champion (1927)
- Honoured Member of the Manitoba Hockey Hall of Fame
- Inducted into the Manitoba Sports Hall of Fame and Museum in 1980
