= Commonwealth Foundation =

Intergovernmental organisation

- Logo
- Abbreviation: CF
- Formation: 1966; 60 years ago
- Type: Intergovernmental organisation
- Headquarters: Marlborough House; London, SW1
- Members: 48 Member States +1 Associate Member
- Chair: Ambassador Shree Baboo Chekitan Servansing
- Director-General: Anne Gallagher
- Website: commonwealthfoundation.com

The Commonwealth Foundation (CF) is an intergovernmental organisation that was established by the Commonwealth Heads of Government in 1966, a year after its sister organisation, the Commonwealth Secretariat. The foundation is located at Marlborough House in London, a former royal palace which was assigned for the use of these Commonwealth institutions by Queen Elizabeth II, the former Head of the Commonwealth. As the Commonwealth agency for civil society, the foundation is funded by 49 member states to support participatory governance through its programmes. The foundation provides resources, grants and access to platforms to encourage better engagement between civil society and institutions of governance. Membership of the Commonwealth Foundation is voluntary and is separate from membership of the Commonwealth of Nations.

== Structure and governance ==
=== History ===
The Commonwealth Foundation, along with its sister organisation the Commonwealth Secretariat, was conceived at the 1964 Conference of Commonwealth Prime Ministers. The idea of a Commonwealth Secretariat was first floated by President Nkrumah of Ghana and the concept of the Commonwealth Foundation was proposed by Alec Douglas-Home, the British Prime Minister. The British Government offered to contribute half the proposed annual income of £250,000. Initially, the idea of locating the foundation in London was dismissed on the basis that the Commonwealth Secretariat would be based there. However, it was later agreed that it should be based in London as many of the professional associations operating throughout the Commonwealth had offices in Britain.

In line with the "Agreed memorandum on the Commonwealth Foundation" a "distinguished private citizen" was to be appointed as the chairman and a board of trustees formed with each member government having the "right to nominate one member of the Board". In addition a director was to be appointed. In 1966, it was agreed that Sir Frank Macfarlane Burnet should be the first chairman and John Chadwick the first director of the foundation. The first board of trustees comprised both nominations of independent individuals and London-based High Commissioners. The independent trustees were Dr Leslie Farrer-Brown (Britain); Escott Reid (Canada); Dick Campbell (New Zealand); Akintola Williams (Nigeria); Robert Loinsworth (Trinidad and Tobago); Dr Hugh Springer (Barbados); and Dr C. Columbos (Malta). All other member countries were represented by their London-based High Commissioners.

While the Commonwealth Secretariat was established to support the political endeavours of the Commonwealth, the "Foundation was brought into being in the hope that it would give further substance to the old truism that the Commonwealth is as much an association of peoples as of governments".

On 1 March 1966, the Commonwealth Foundation was registered as a Charitable Trust and came into being under English Law. The trust deed, as registered with the Charity Commission described the aims of the foundation as, 'To maintain and improve (in the interests of the public) standards of knowledge attainment and conduct in the skilled and learned professions or skilled auxiliary occupations within the Commonwealth'. Based on this, more specific aims were developed, which, in 1969, Chadwick summarised as:

1. To encourage the growth of Commonwealth-wide professional associations
2. To help to create national professional societies as part of a general process of "deanglicization"
3. To promote regional professional activity
4. To encourage the personal interchange of skills and experience
5. To aid the broadening of experience through the printed word

The foundation began to implement these aims by focusing on three main areas of work i.e. facilitating the creation of Commonwealth-wide professional associations; disseminating printed information and supporting the professional development of individuals. Given the modest budget of the foundation, the role of the organisation was defined as being "more catalytic than executive".

In 1979, the foundation's mandate was extended to include work with a broader range of non-governmental organisations involved in work such as rural development, social welfare, disability, gender and arts and culture.

In 1982, a decision was taken to reconstitute the foundation as an international organisation – a process that was completed on 14 February 1983. Since then, the remit of the Commonwealth Foundation has continued to broaden and grow. With the aim of strengthening civil society and enhancing its contribution to development in the Commonwealth, the foundation now works with non-governmental and voluntary organisations, faith-based institutions, the media and trade unions.

The Commonwealth Foundation was already unique as an intergovernmental body established solely to support civil society, but in 2004, the foundation took the additional step of revising its governance structure to include civil society representatives. Uniquely for an intergovernmental organisation, five members of civil society now sit on the Board of Governors alongside representatives of member governments.

=== Governance ===
Today, the Board of Governors comprises all member Governments (usually represented by their London-based High Commissioners) and five civil society representatives. The Board meets annually and is supported by the Executive and Grants Committees which meet twice yearly. In addition, there are two advisory committees namely the Civil Society Advisory Committee, drawn from NGOs and professional bodies across the Commonwealth and Commonwealth Writers' Prize Advisory Committee.

Throughout its history, the foundation has been led by various individuals. The first chairman of the foundation was Nobel laureate Sir Frank Macfarlane Burnet and the first director was John Chadwick. Today, the chair of the foundation is Ambassador Shree Baboo Chekitan Servansing, and the Director is Vijay Krishnarayan.

=== Membership ===
Membership of the foundation is open to all Commonwealth governments.

==== Member States ====
Currently, the foundation has 51 Member States:

===== Africa =====
- Botswana
- Cameroon
- Eswatini
- Gabon
- The Gambia
- Ghana
- Kenya
- Lesotho
- Malawi
- Mauritius
- Mozambique
- Namibia
- Nigeria
- Rwanda
- Seychelles
- Sierra Leone
- South Africa
- Tanzania
- Uganda
- Zambia

===== Americas =====
- Antigua and Barbuda
- Bahamas
- Barbados
- Belize
- Canada
- Dominica
- Grenada
- Guyana
- Jamaica
- Saint Kitts and Nevis
- Saint Lucia
- Saint Vincent and the Grenadines
- Trinidad and Tobago

===== Asia =====
- Bangladesh
- Brunei Darussalam
- India
- Malaysia
- Maldives
- Pakistan
- Sri Lanka

===== Europe =====
- Cyprus
- Malta
- United Kingdom

===== Oceania =====
- Australia
- Kiribati
- New Zealand
- Papua New Guinea
- Samoa
- Solomon Islands
- Tonga
- Vanuatu

==== Associate Member State ====
In addition, the foundation has one Associate Member State:

- Gibraltar (since 2004)

==== Other Commonwealth Nations ====
The rest of the Commonwealth Nations that are not members of the foundation are:

- Fiji
- Nauru
- Singapore
- Togo
- Tuvalu

== Early programmes of work ==
=== Professional Centres ===
In the 1960s, professional networks in many of the newer Commonwealth countries were weak and professional associations lacked recognition. In 1967, following a meeting in Uganda between John Chadwick, the director of the foundation, and professionals from various sectors, the idea of a "Professional Centre" was conceived. A few months later, the foundation awarded a grant that helped support the development of a Professional Centre in Kampala, Uganda. By 1981, Professional Centres were established, or being planned, in 18 Commonwealth countries. Although there was no blueprint, most centres sought to promote co-operation, professional development and provide professional advice to governments on relevant policy and legal issues. Today, several of these professional centres, or subsequent incarnations of them, continue to prosper as independent organisations (see external links below) but they are no longer funded by the foundation.

=== Commonwealth professional associations ===
When the foundation was formed, at least two Commonwealth professional associations already existed, namely the Commonwealth Association of Architects and the Commonwealth Medical Association.

With the foundation's encouragement and support (which included grants for travel and administrative costs), several other professional associations developed—including bodies working in the legal, nursing, veterinary and surveying fields. Almost all of these associations continue to function today. According to Chadwick, rather than encouraging "professional exclusivity" the secretariats of these associations were designed to "collate and disseminate professional views and experience, co-ordinate programmes for Commonwealth wide or regional meetings; stimulate studies on training, curricula, reciprocity, standards, publications and the like." Today, these organisations also have opportunities to influence the programme of work of the Commonwealth Secretariat, and to enter into dialogue with Commonwealth ministries at their various meetings.

=== Books and Journals for Professionals ===
Complementing its work with the professional associations, the foundation provided grants to help with the development of three new professional journals namely:

- Tropical Doctor, a quarterly journal produced by the Royal Society of Medicine was launched in 1973.
- Appropriate Technology was launched in co-operation with the Intermediate Technology Development Group (now known as Practical Action).
- Support was given to help produce a French-language Dental Journal into a bilingual Anglo-French publication.

In addition, the foundation supported the cost of subscriptions to some professional journals so that they could be distributed to teaching and professional institutions, for example:

- For three years the Institute of Engineers in India received copies of various journals which, because of its limited access to foreign exchange at that time, it could not purchase directly itself.
- The foundation supported the subscription costs of the Tropical Diseases Bulletin and the Abstracts of Hygiene so they could be distributed to selected teaching hospitals, medical associations and libraries in developing countries.

In recent years, the foundation has continued to provide financial support for some professional journals. For example, since 1998 it has contributed to the production costs of the Commonwealth Forestry Association's newsletter and Commonwealth Judicial Journal [Commonwealth Magistrates and Judges Association].

== Current programmes of work ==
=== Commonwealth People's Forum ===
The Commonwealth People's Forums takes place every two years immediately before the Commonwealth Heads of Government Meeting (CHOGM). The Forum is organised by the host government, civil society organisations and the foundation. It gives civil society organisations (CSOs) a chance to network and dialogue with governments. Since the first Forum in 1997, the event has increased in size and the range of activities that take place has expanded.

The first Forum was in Edinburgh, Scotland (1997). Subsequently, it has been held in Durban, South Africa (1999); Brisbane, Australia (2001); Abuja, Nigeria (2003), Malta (2005) and Kampala (2007), Port of Spain, Trinidad and Tobago (2009), Perth, Western Australia (2011) and Hikkaduwa, Sri Lanka (2013).

=== Ministerial meetings ===
Ministerial meetings, together with the biennial Commonwealth Heads of Government Meetings (CHOGM), seek to build consensus on issues of concern to member states. The work of the Commonwealth Secretariat is guided by the outcomes of all these meetings. With the support of the Commonwealth Foundation, civil society participation in CHOGM and Ministerial Meetings has been steadily increasing since the late 1990s. Civil society participation in Ministerial Meetings on finance, women's affairs, HIPC and health has been particularly significant.

Since 2002, civil society organisations have presented statements at the annual Commonwealth Finance Ministers Meeting. Reflecting the themes of the meetings, statements have been published on "Financing for Development" (2002); "The Provision of Essential Services" (2003); "Capacity of International Institutions to Support Pro-Poor Trade Liberalisation in Low-Income and Vulnerable Countries" (2004); and "Giving Practical Effect to the Millennium Project Review" (2005). Each year, civil society organisations met immediately ahead of the Ministers Meeting to prepare the statements. In 2006, the outcomes of an e-consultation process was used to further inform debate and shape the statement on "An Agenda for Growth and Livelihoods".

Meetings of Commonwealth Ministers responsible for Women's Affairs have been held every three years since 1985. In 2004, ahead of the Seventh Women's Affairs Ministers Meeting (held in Fiji), the Commonwealth Foundation organised preparatory meetings, helped establish a steering committee and supported committee members as they consulted civil society organisations in their regions. Uniquely for a Commonwealth Ministerial meeting, civil society representatives were invited to participate in the Minster's meeting and in the committee that drafted the Commonwealth Plan of Action for Gender Equality 2005–2015.

Heavily Indebted Poor Countries (HIPC) are judged to have the highest levels of poverty in the world and are subject to international debt relief measures that seek to reduce their external debt to sustainable levels. Commonwealth HIPC Ministers meet twice a year to discuss issues of common interest. The Commonwealth Foundation supports civil society participation at these meetings, giving civil society representatives an opportunity to share their views with Ministers and take information back to national and regional networks engaged in work on debt and HIPC issues.

The Commonwealth Health Ministers meet annually in Geneva, prior to meetings of the World Health Assembly. Accredited civil society organisations participate in the meetings.

=== Competitions and awards ===
The Commonwealth Foundation prizes, including the Commonwealth Writers' Prize, were given annually between 1987 and 2011. A new initiative was started in 2011, Commonwealth Writers, which presented the Commonwealth Short Story Prize.

== See also ==
- Commonwealth Lawyers Association
- Commonwealth Parliamentary Association
- Commonwealth Press Union
