= 1992 Nobel Prize in Literature =

- Derek Walcott
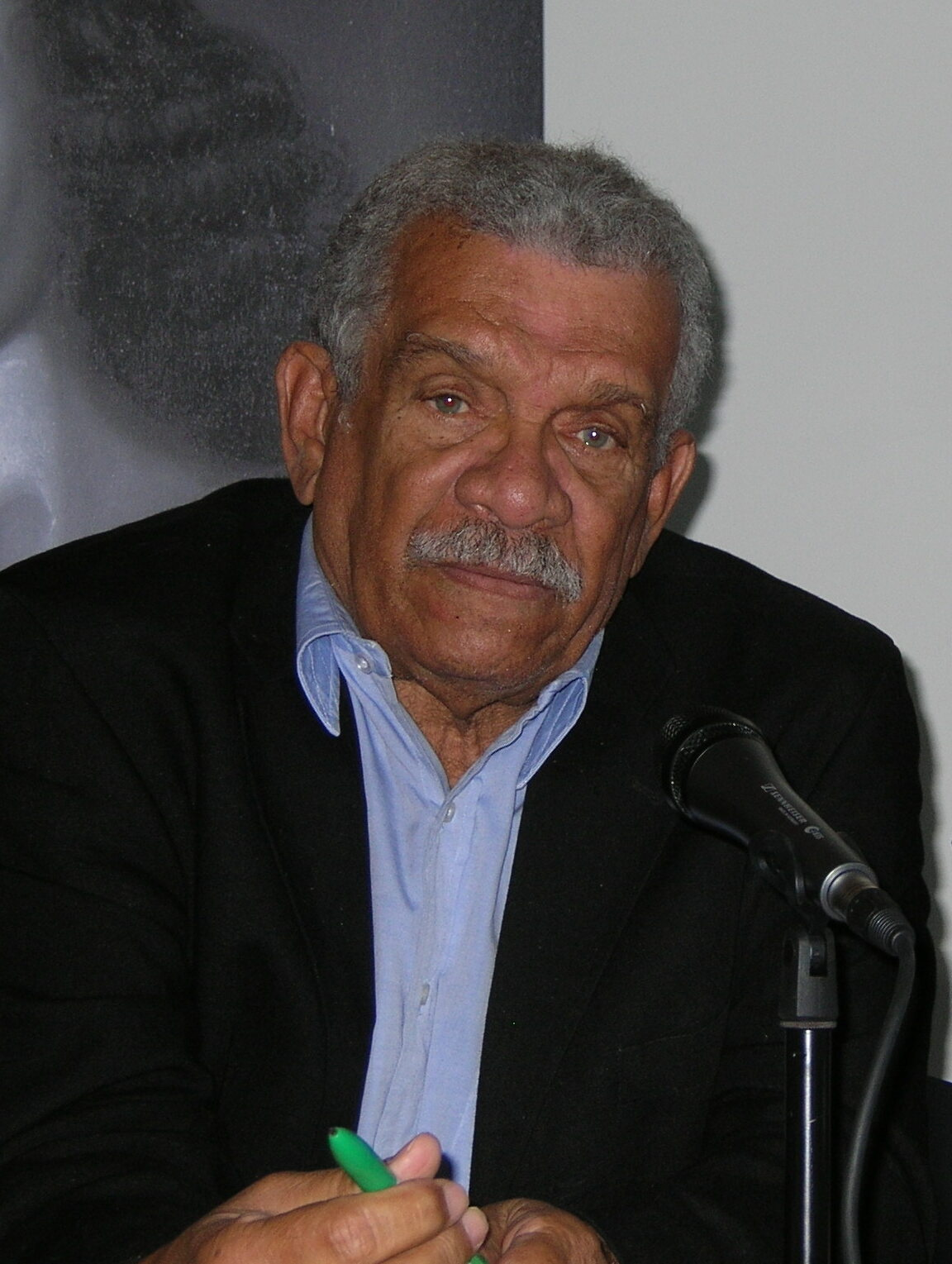
- "for a poetic oeuvre of great luminosity, sustained by a historical vision, the outcome of a multicultural commitment."
- Date: 8 October 1992 (announcement); 10 December 1992 (ceremony)
- Location: Stockholm, Sweden
- Presented by: Swedish Academy
- First award: 1901
- Website: Official website

The 1992 Nobel Prize in Literature was awarded to the Saint Lucian poet Derek Walcott (1930–2017) "for a poetic oeuvre of great luminosity, sustained by a historical vision, the outcome of a multicultural commitment." He became the first Caribbean writer to be awarded with the prize.

== Laureate ==
Derek Walcott's works often deal with Caribbean history, while he simultaneous searches for vestiges of the colonial era. Western literary canon is revised and given a completely new form, as in the poetry collection Omeros (1990). His poetic voice reflected a blend of his ear for the English language and his sense of his own people. In his writing, Walcott explores the complexity of living and working in two cultures. Aside from poetry, Walcott also wrote plays which brought him theatre recognitions such as Henri Christophe: A Chronicle in Seven Scenes (1950), Dream on Monkey Mountain (1967), and Beef, No Chicken (1987).

== Pre-announcement speculations ==
In 1992, among the favorites speculated to win the prize were Irish poet Seamus Heaney (awarded in 1995), Trinidad-born V. S. Naipaul (awarded in 2001), Flemish-Belgian Hugo Claus, Portuguese José Saramago (awarded in 1998), Canadian Robertson Davies, Latvian Vizma Belševica, Estonian Jaan Kross and Danish Villy Sørensen.

== Reactions ==
Stephen Breslow of University of Tampa had since the mid-1980s predicted that Walcott would become a Nobel laureate in literature and explained that the likely reasons why Swedish Academy chose Derek Walcott was because his work had "a strong regional voice that transcends its topical locality, through the depth and breadth of its poetic resonance and through its global human implication." It was Walcott's ability to be more than just "exotic" that brought his work critical attention. Breslow explains that "Walcott has merged a profound, rhapsodic reverie upon his remote birthplace – its people, its landscape, and its history – with the central, classical tradition of Western civilization." This ability shows the importance of multiculturalism and literary mastery to the Swedish Academy. Walcott's works represent how different cultures can enrich one another to produce even more compelling works.

A. James Arnold, director of New World Studies at the University of Virginia and organizer of the conference "Stories of American Identities: 500 Years After the Columbian Encounter," said: "The selection of Walcott seems already somehow inevitable. Of all the writers in the Western world, he's the one who ties us together best. From the Native Americans through the Europeans and the descendants of Africans, he moves apparently effortlessly but with great art from his small island across space and time. He gives enormous breadth and depth to our experience in the Americas."

Some critics complained that Walcott was chosen for political correctness reasons as much as for his poetry, but Herbert Leibowitz, editor of Parnassus: Poetry in Review, said, "He will be a popular choice in the poetry world. He has one of the most wonderful ears of any poet now writing."

== Nobel lecture ==
Derek Walcott delivered his Nobel lecture at the Swedish Academy on 7 December 1992. Entitled The Antilles: Fragments of Epic Memory, Walcott describes life on Antilles and what it means to discover identity. He describes all of the "broken fragments" of his "diasporic" identity. People need books, he says, but they are not enough to encompass all that a culture is. Walcott says that "the visible poetry of the Antilles, then. [is] Survival" because "all of the Antilles, every island, is an effort of memory; every mind, every racial biography culminating in amnesia and fog." He encompasses the diasporic identity found in Caribbean literature by looking at how insignificant he feels because he cannot, alone, fully bring together a cultural identity.

== Award ceremony speech ==
At the award ceremony in Stockholm on 10 December 1992, Kjell Espmark of the Swedish Academy said:

Walcott’s art arises from the crossing of two greatly differing traditions, the first a tradition he allowed himself to be adopted by, the European lineage from Homer via Dante, the Elizabethans, and Milton to Auden and Dylan Thomas, an elaborate tradition discernible in lavish metaphor and luxurious sound and rhythm, the second a domestic ageless tradition, an elementary language where, like a new Adam, the poet gives things their names, perceiving how the speech sounds take shape (...) But this very personal combination includes not only themes and language. It is also a question of historical outlook. And here we are helped by yet another formula – “the New Aegean”. The archipelago in focus is a reincarnation of the Aegean one: Greek antiquity finds a natural home in the Caribbean present. This can of course be most distinctly seen in Walcott’s latest work, Omeros, his mosaic epic about the fisherman Achille and his ex-colleague the taxi driver Hector fighting for the favour of the fair housemaid Helen. But the Homeric pattern in this poem is not unique. In fact, Omeros has been emerging all through Walcott’s production, appearing again and again in names and themes and continuously present in the Odyssean surging of the waves.
