= Ellen O'Malley Camps =

Actor, producer and playwright

Ellen O'Malley Camps also known as Helen Camps is an Irish-born Trinidad and Tobago actor, stage director, producer and playwright.

== Theatre career ==
Camps was invited by her neighbour, Michael de la Bastide, to participate in a pantomime being put on by his sister. Her performance was noticed by Derek Walcott, who as there to review the play for the Trinidad Guardian, and he invited her to the Trinidad Theatre Workshop. Camps made her stage debut in Walcott's Dream on Monkey Mountain, and went on to appear in Ti-Jean and His Brothers, and In a Fine Castle, but found herself more interested in rehearsal and production than in being on stage.

In the late 1970s, after Walcott left the TTW, Camps took the job of director and theatre manager at the Little Carib Theatre. Camps and Tony Hall, another TTW member, launched All Theatre Productions, and launched the company's first season in 1978 at the Little Carib. Her production of Athol Fugard's play Sizwe Banzi is Dead was described by Walcott as "one of the finest" and found it "at least equal to the best" New York City productions.

=== Trinidad Tent Theatre ===
Camps resigned from her position at the Little Carib on April 1, 1982, amidst conflict with the theatre's founder, Beryl McBurnie, and established the Trinidad Tent Theatre in September of that year.

The Trinidad Tent Theatre came to an end in 1987 when a tree fell on the tent. By that time, Camps said she "was completely burnt out and the actors were exhausted".

=== Later work ===
Camps established a film theatre programme at the Maximum Security Men's Prison in Arouca as an attempt to "facilitate personal transformation", especially among long-term inmates at the prison. Work began in 2011 and continued until it was shut down under COVID-19 pandemic restrictions.

== Personal life ==
Camps met her husband, Michael Camps, in Dublin. They moved to Trinidad and Tobago, his home country, in 1966. That same year, she became a citizen of the country. She has five children.
