= Godfrey Sealy =

Trinidad and Tobago playwright, director, actor, and HIV/AIDS activist

Godfrey Stephen Sealy (July 3, 1959 – April 26, 2006) was a Trinidad and Tobago playwright, director, actor, and HIV/AIDS activist. Sealy was diagnosed HIV positive in 1988. That year he staged the play, One of Our Sons Is Missing. The play was the first in Trinidad and Tobago to address the subject of HIV and AIDS.

== Early life and education ==
Sealy was born in Port of Spain, and raised in St. James. He attended Fatima College, and was mentored by Beryl McBurnie.

== Career ==
=== Theatre work ===
Sealy began his acting career at the Trinidad Tent Theatre where he worked under the direction of Helen Camps. As part of the Prime Minister's Best Village competition, he worked with local theatre groups around the country.

In 1984 Sealy founded the Playhouse Company and put on productions including The Rocky Horror Show and an original work, Limin'.

In 1988, Sealy staged One of Our Sons Is Missing, a play about a young bisexual man who becomes infected with HIV, contracts AIDS, and dies. It was the first play in Trinidad and Tobago, and in the wider Caribbean, to deal with the subject of AIDS. The play was published by Macmillan Caribbean as part of a collection, You Can Lead a Horse to Water and Other Plays, in 2005. The portrayal of marital rape in his 1989 play Home Sweet Home has also been noted as an example of how the theatre in Trinidad and Tobago has been used to draw attention to injustices in society.

=== HIV/AIDS activism ===
Sealy worked extensively to raise AIDS awareness. After staging One of Our Sons Is Missing in 1988, he went on to create a video to raise awareness in the context of Carnival 1989.

Sealy founded Community Action Resource (CARE) together with Anglican priest (and later Bishop of Grenada) Clyde Harvey. CARE provided food, medication and counselling for people infected with HIV/AIDS, and was the first group in the country to provide support for them.

He worked with UNAIDS, UNDP and PAHO to raise awareness and support research into the disease.

Sealy worked with Caribbean Epidemiology Centre (CAREC) as part of their Special Programme on Sexually Transmitted Infections, particularly with the gay community and men who have sex with men.

== Personal life ==
Sealy was openly gay. He was diagnosed as being HIV positive in 1988, having become infected with the virus while a student in Los Angeles. His home in Woodbrook became a safe space for abused and marginalised people, and a hub for the theatre community.

Godfrey Sealy died of complications from pneumonia on April 26, 2006.

== See also ==
- Merchant (calypsonian)
