= Harry Dernier =

Play written by Derek Walcott

Harry Dernier: A Play for Radio Production is a play by Derek Walcott, who won the Nobel Prize for Literature in 1992. It was first published in 1952. A play about the last man on earth, and his decision about whether to draw out his life or end it, it has been described as more vernacular than his previous work, but "still literary in style and highly metaphysical in tone", and has drawn comparison to T. S. Eliot's The Waste Land. Written when he was sixteen years old, Harry Dernier was the earliest-written of Walcott's early plays to be staged, in 1952, when he was 22, though his later play Henri Christophe: A Chronicle in Seven Scenes, written at age 19, was also staged in 1952 and was regarded by Walcott as his first play.
