= Beef, No Chicken =

- Written by: Derek Walcott
- Original language: English
- Subject: Modernisation in a small Caribbean town.
- Genre: Drama, Farce
- Setting: Couva, Trinidad and Tobago.

Premiere

Beef, No Chicken is a two-act play by Caribbean playwright Derek Walcott. The play is set in the town of Couva, in Trinidad and Tobago. It follows restaurant owner Otto Hogan, whose refusal to accept graft delays the building of a highway through the centre of the town.

The play is a farce which satirises the Americanisation of the Caribbean.

== Synopsis ==
=== Act I ===
Beef, No Chicken opens as Otto rushes into his roti restaurant, removing a dress. It is soon revealed that he wears the dress in an attempt to create a folk legend about a spirit called "The Mysterious Stranger" haunting the construction of a highway though Couva. The chef employed by his restaurant, Sumintra, quits because Otto cannot pay her after his refusal to serve the construction crews working on the highway. Cedric Hart, an anchor on the local news, crashes his van into a ditch outside Otto's restaurant while doing a story on "The Mysterious Stranger." Otto's starstruck niece Drusilla leaves with Cedric. Euphony convinces the schoolmaster Eldridge Franco to play the role of the "Mysterious Stranger" as the guard dogs have caught on to Otto's scent. He escapes, but loses Euphony's hat at the construction site. The two bandits attempt to rob Euphony, but she dissuades them by telling them of fifteen thousand dollars in an unguarded payroll truck meant for workers on the highway. The mayor and the other members of the borough council unsuccessfully attempt to bribe Otto and the act ends with the unexpected return of a long lost fiancé of Euphony named Cardiff Joe from Wales.

=== Act II ===
In the second act, Cardiff Joe and Euphony plan a date for their wedding. Cedric returns to film a commercial for Otto's restaurant. Cardiff Joe makes an anonymous bomb threat against the highway on the same day as his wedding to Euphony. The mayor uses the hat implicating Euphony as "The Mysterious Stranger" to force Otto into allowing the highway. The play ends with Franco and Sumintra joining Cedric and Drusilla on a live broadcast of the six o clock news.

== Characters ==
- Otto Hogan, owner of a restaurant and auto repair shop
- Sumintra Ramsingh, chef
- Euphony Hogan, Otto's sister
- The Limer, an idler who does odd jobs around Couva
- Eldridge Franco, schoolmaster
- Drusilla Douglas, Otto's niece
- Cedric Hart, local news presenter
- Hernando Cadiz, the corrupt mayor of Couva
- Mitzi Almandoz, a widow, secretary of the borough council
- Mr. Mongroo, member of the borough council
- Mr. Lai Fook, member of the borough council
- Cardiff Joe, also known as Alwyn Davies, long lost seaman
- The Deacon, itinerant preacher
- First Bandit
- Second Bandit

== Productions ==
Beef, No Chicken was first produced April 30, 1981 by the Trinidad Theatre Workshop. The production was staged at the Little Carib Theatre in Port of Spain and directed by Cecil Gray. It was produced by Yale Repertory Theatre at Yale University in New Haven, Connecticut during Winterfest II beginning in January 1982.

The original production included Theresa Awai as Sumintra, Errol Jones as Otto, and Stanley Marshall as Eldridge. The Yale Repertory Theatre cast included Norman Matlock as Otto, Angela Basset as Drusilla, Barbara Montgomery as Euphony, Sullivan Walker as The Limer, Charles S. Dutton as Mr. Mongroo, and Gilbert Lewis as Cardiff Joe.

== Themes ==
According to Helen Gilbert and Joanne Tompkins, Beef, No Chicken is a critique of neocolonialism and neoimperialism in which Mangroo serves as a stand-in for American multinational corporations.
