= Culture of Trinidad and Tobago =

The culture of Trinidad and Tobago reflects the influence of Indian-South Asian, African, Indigenous, European, Chinese, North American, Latino, and Arab cultures. The histories of Trinidad and Tobago are different. There are differences in the cultural influences which have shaped each island. Trinidad and Tobago is an English-speaking country with strong links to the United Kingdom.

Historical membership in the British Empire left a major influence on the country, including the differences of the English language and the popularity of the two top sports in the country, football, and cricket.

== Festivals ==
=== Carnival ===
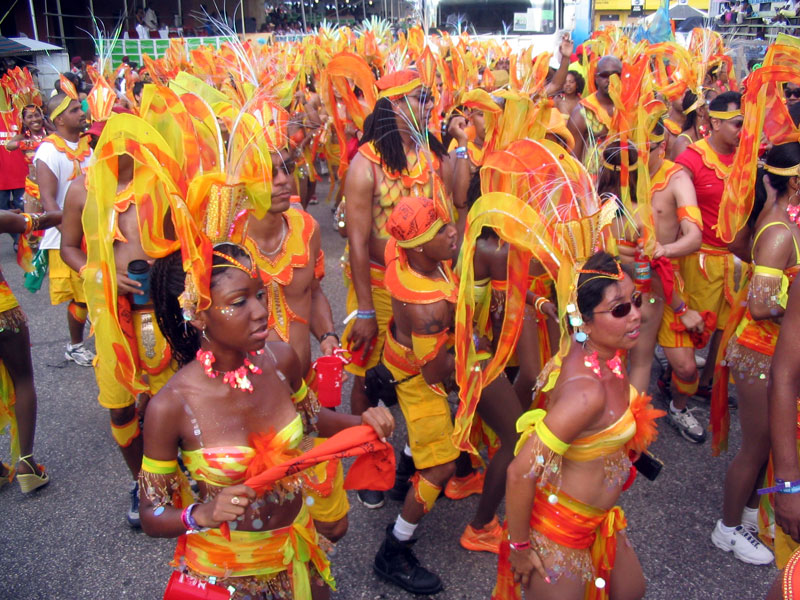
Members of a Costume band parade in Port of Spain during Carnival

The most influential single cultural factor in Trinidad and Tobago is Carnival, brought to Trinidad by French settlers from Martinique in the later part of the 18th century. Originally the celebration was confined to the elite, but it was imitated and adapted by their African slaves and, after the abolition of slavery in 1838, the practice spread into the free population. The Canboulay Riots of 1881 were a turning point in the evolution of Trinidad Carnival. Carnival was originally confined to the upper classes, which rode the streets in floats, or watched from the upper stories of residences and businesses. The night was given over to the lower classes. The first few hours of Carnival Monday morning, from about 4 am until sunrise was known as J'ouvert (a contraction of jour ouvert). Costumed and masked by the darkness, J'ouvert allowed the wealthy to mix with the poor in relative anonymity. Monday night (night 'mas) had a similar, but lesser function.

==== Mas' ====
The daytime of Carnival Monday and Tuesday are dominated by costumed masqueraders. Until World War II, most of these masqueraders portrayed traditional African influenced characters including the Midnight Robber, Police and Thief, Wild-American Indian, Bat', and Jab Mola individuals gave way to organized bands, which today can include thousands of masqueraders. Peter Minshall is often considered the greatest mas' designer.

==== Carnival fetes ====
Carnival takes place most heatedly during the week before the actual parade of bands on Carnival Monday and Tuesday. However, traditionally, the Carnival season begins on Boxing Day 26 December and soca and calypso music reign supreme over the airwaves. The fetes that take place from year end through carnival (usually in February) are generally carnival-themed and feature live music from bands and soca artists who are promoting their song contributions for the year.

=== Christmas ===
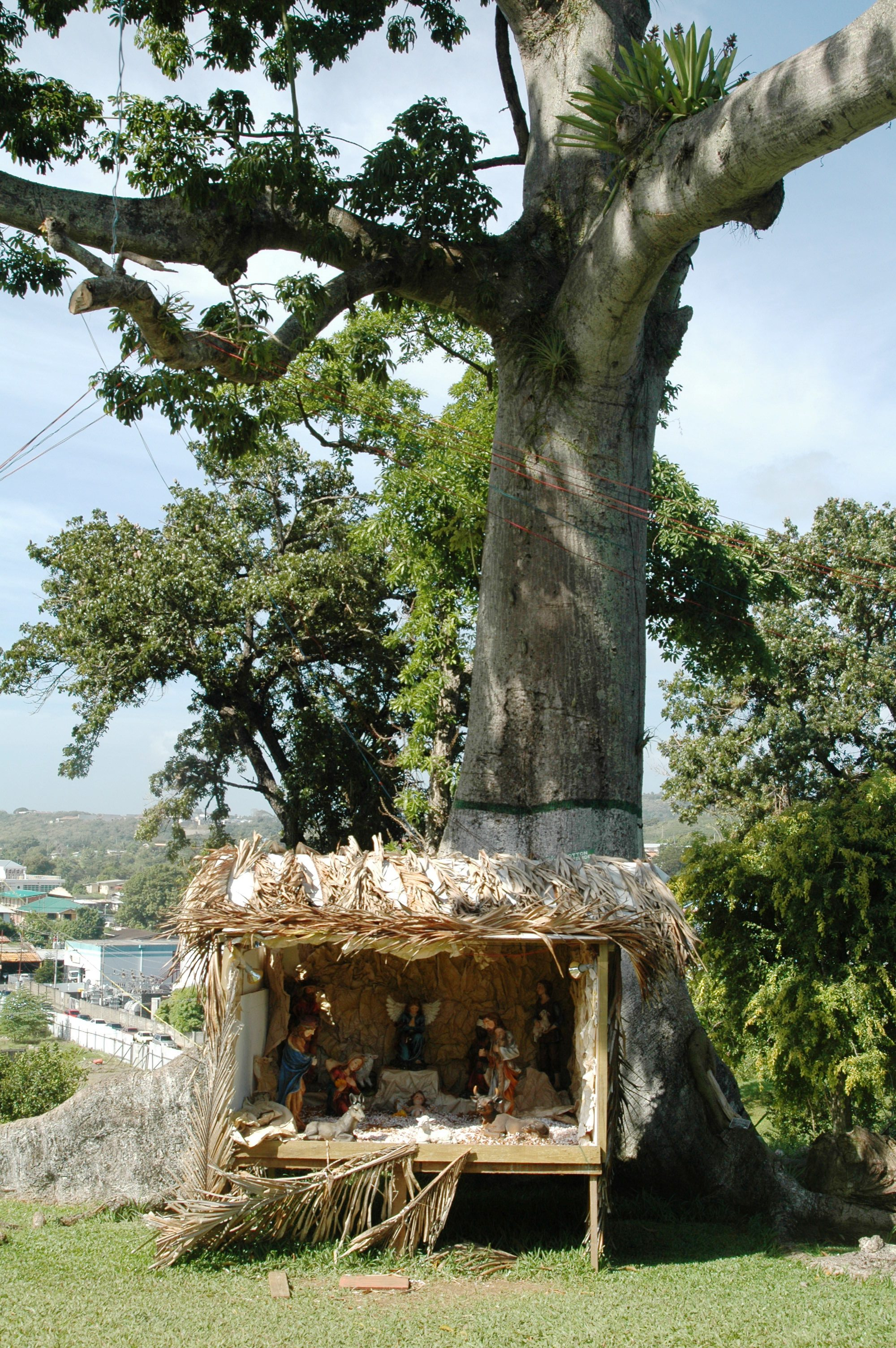
Nativity scene in Scarborough, Tobago, Trinidad and Tobago.

In Christmas, parang is the traditional form of music at that time of year as well as a modern admixture called soca parang. Pastelle, black cake, fruit cake, sweet bread (paime) are customary eats; Peardrax, ponche de creme ("punch a crem'"), ginger beer, sorrel wine are the drinks. As most of the residents are Christian, Christmas is one of the biggest celebrations in Trinidad and Tobago..

=== Divali ===
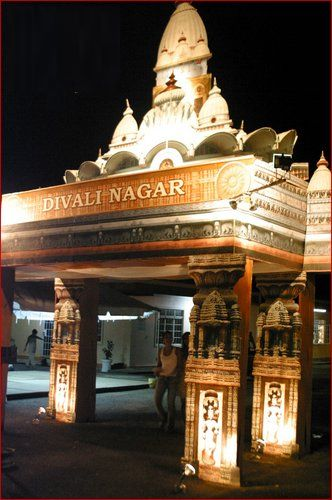
Divali Nagar in Chaguanas, Caroni County, Trinidad and Tobago.

Diyas lighting on Divali night in Trinidad and Tobago.

Divali is a Hindu festival, a celebration of the victory of good over evil. The Divali Nagar is a fair that originated in Trinidad and Tobago.

=== Hosay ===
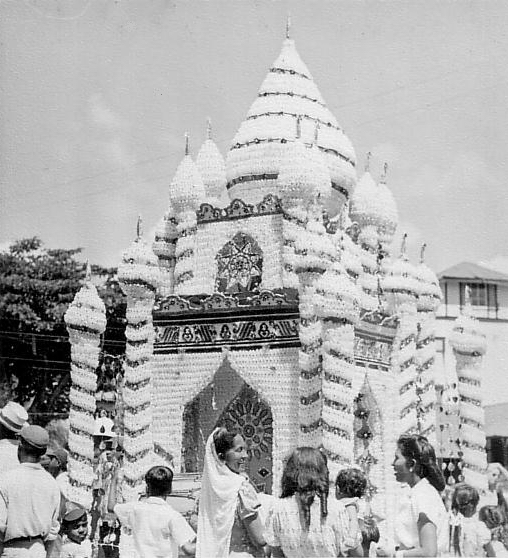
A tadjah at Hosay in the 1950s.

Hosay is the local manifestation of the Shia Muslim Remembrance of Muharram in Trinidad and Tobago (where is it spelled Hussay). The name Hosay comes from "Husayn", whose martyrdom is commemorated in the festival. Recently it has been revived elsewhere.

=== Phagwah ===
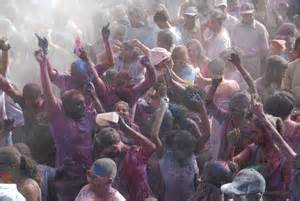
People celebrating Phagwah.

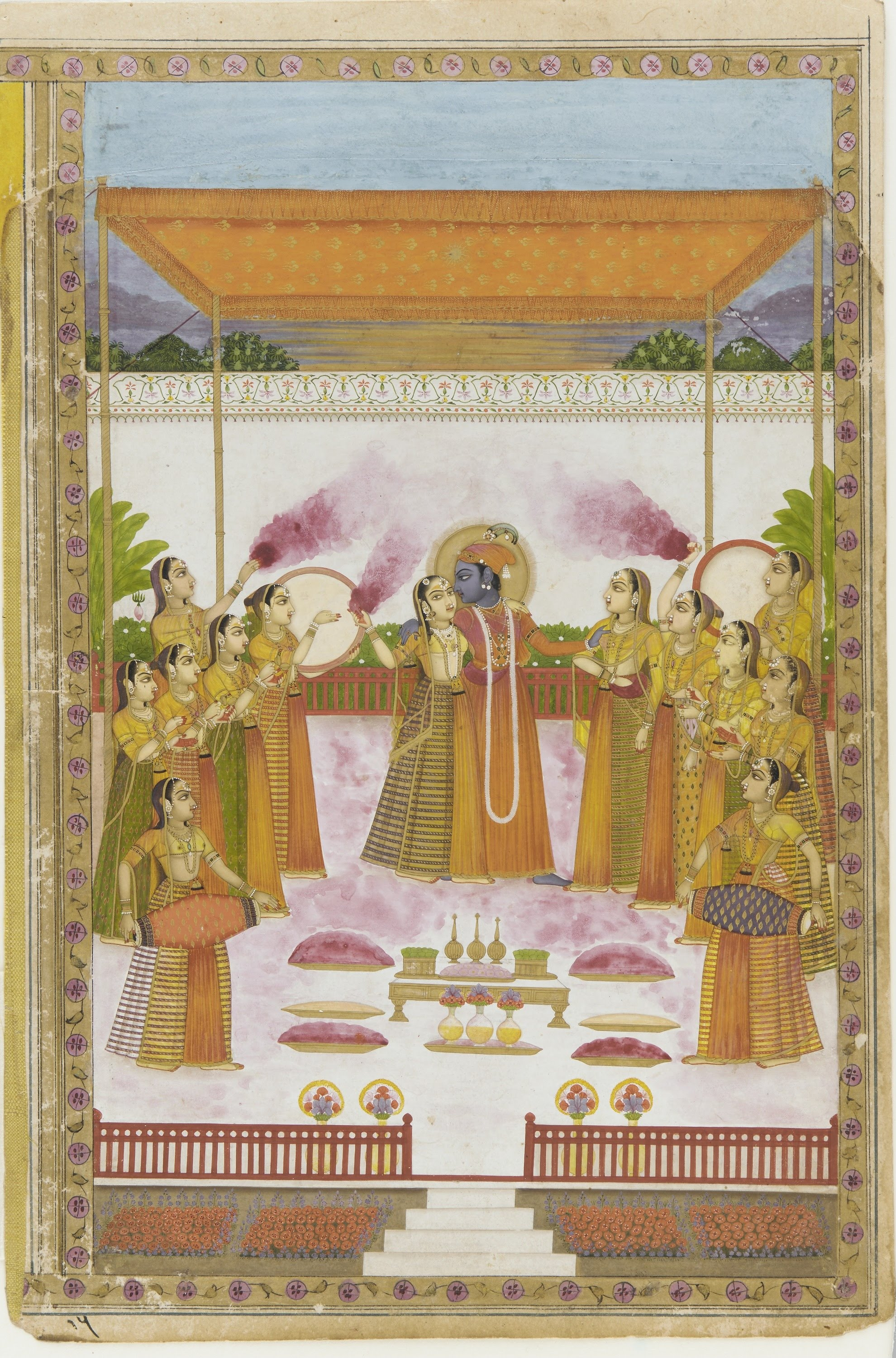
Krishna, Radha, and the Gopis celebrating Phagwah.

A Hindu spring festival, celebrated as a festival of colours.

=== Maha Shivratri ===
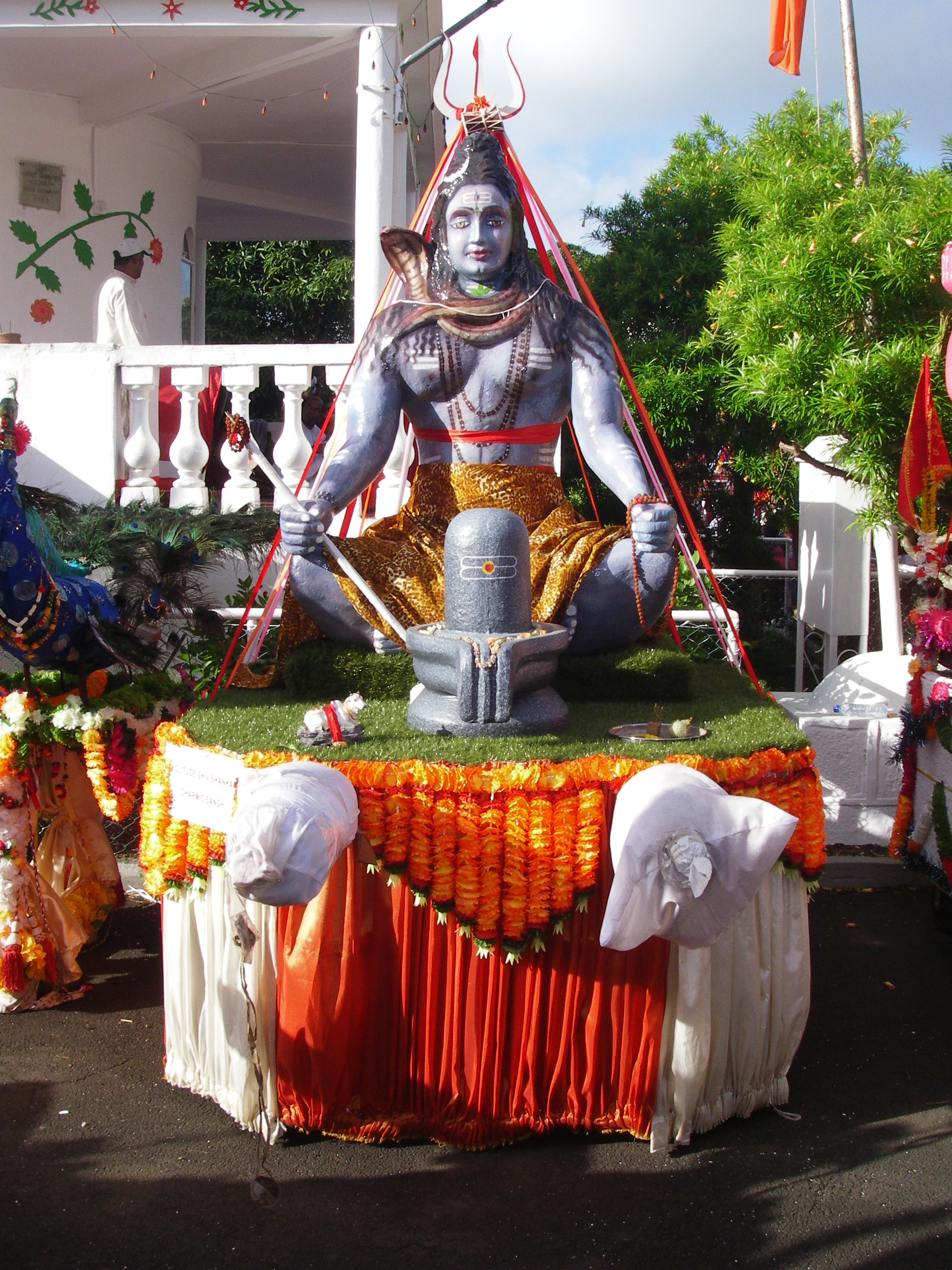
Maha Shivratri festival

A Hindu Festival celebrated annually in which thousands of devotees spend night in over 400 temples across the land, offering special jhal (a mixture of milk, dahi (yogurt), honey, flowers, bael leaves, pipal leaves, paan leaves, sugar-cane juice, and sugar) to Lord Shiva.

== Music ==
Calypso music developed together with Carnival. The chantuelle, who spoke for the band, evolved into the calypsonian (and other characters, such as the Midnight Robber). The music, which drew upon African and French influences, became the voice of the people. It allowed the masses to challenge the doings of the unelected Governor and Legislative Council, and the elected town councils of Port of Spain and San Fernando. As English replaced patois (Creole French) as the dominant language, calypso migrated into English, and in so doing it attracted more attention from the government. Calypso continued to play an important role in political expression, and also served to document the history of Trinidad and Tobago.

=== Calypso ===
Calypso is a style of Afro-Caribbean music that originated in Trinidad and Tobago during the early to mid-20th century and spread to the rest of Caribbean Antilles and Venezuela. Its rhythms can be traced back to West African Kaiso and the arrival of French planters and their slaves from the French Antilles in the 18th century.

=== Soca ===
Soca is a dance music which is a mix of Trinidad's calypso and Indian music and rhythms, especially chutney music. It combines the melodic lilting sound of calypso with insistent kadans percussion, and Indian musical instruments—particularly the dholak, tabla and dhantal—as demonstrated in Shorty's classic compositions "Ïndrani" and "Shanti Om". Soca and its derivatives (Chutney soca, Groovy soca, Power soca) have largely displaced mainstream calypso as the music of Carnivaless.

=== Chutney ===
Chutney was born out of the East Indian influence in Trinidad, and derives elements both from traditional Indian music and popular soca music.

=== Chutney Soca ===
Chutney soca music is a crossover style of music incorporating soca music elements and chutney music elements and is sung in Trinidadian Hindustani and English lyrics.

=== Rapso ===
Rapso is a uniquely Trinidadian music that grew out of the social unrest of the 1970s, though it is often described as a fusion of soca and calypso with American hip hop.

=== Parang ===
Parang is a music with Caribbean and Latin American cultural influences. The word is derived from two Spanish words: Parranda, meaning "a spree or fete" and Parar meaning "to stop". Parang is a popular folk music originating out of Trinidad and Tobago, it is part of the Island's Hispanic heritage that originated from over 400 years ago during Spanish rule via Venezuela.

=== Pichakaree ===
Pichakaree is an Indo-Trinidadian musical form which originated in Trinidad and Tobago. Pichakaree songs are generally social commentary, and are sung using a mixture of Trinidadian Hindustani and English words. The musical form was devised by Ravi Ji, spiritual leader of the Hindu Prachar Kendra. Pichakaree competitions are an integral part of Phagwa celebrations hosted by the Hindu Prachar Kendra.

=== Steelband ===
The steelband developed during wartime By people of African ancestry. They were preceded by the Tambu Bamboo bands, which used percussion instruments based on bamboo. The steelband movement developed in the postwar period with multiple bands taking names from war movies like Casablanca, Tokyo, Free French and Tripoli.

== Cuisine ==
The cuisine of Trinidad and Tobago draws upon the varied origins of its people: Indian, African, Creole, European, Amerindian, Chinese, Arab, and Latin American.

African Creole food commonly includes callaloo, macaroni pie and red beans. Indian food is based on curry. Although the Chinese element in the population is small, it is cooked in most homes, and is served in almost all sit-down restaurants.

== Theatre ==
The first permanent folk-dance company and theatre in Trinidad was the Little Carib Theatre. See also: Beryl McBurnie. Indian plays, such as Ram Leela has been incorporated into Trinidad and Tobago's culture.

== Literary scene ==
Trinidad and Tobago has produced a number of noted writers, including Nobel laureates Sir Vidia Naipaul, and other award-winning authors such as Earl Lovelace, Lakshmi Persaud and Michael Anthony.

== Religion ==
The largest religious groups are the Roman Catholics, Hindus and Muslims. The Anglicans, Presbyterians, Methodists, Sikhs, Jews, Jains, Baháʼí, Buddhists, Zorastrians, Rastafarians, Amerindian Religion, Traditional African Religion and Taoism/Chinese folk religion/Confucianism are among the smaller groups. Two Afro-Caribbean syncretic faiths, the Shouter or Spiritual Baptist and the Yoruba/Orisha faith (formerly called Shangos, a less than complimentary term) are among the fastest growing religious groups, as are a host of American-style evangelical and fundamentalist churches usually lumped as "Pentecostal" by most Trinidadians (although this designation is often inaccurate). The Church of Jesus Christ of Latter-day Saints (LDS Church) and the Seventh Day Adventist (SDA) Church) has also expanded its presence in the country since the mid-1980s.
