= Henri Christophe (disambiguation) =

Henri Christophe (1767–1820) was a Haitian military leader and king.

- Henri Christophe: A Chronicle in Seven Scenes, a 1949 play by Derek Walcott
- Henri Christophe (referee), a Belgian international football referee.
