= Trinidad Theatre Workshop =

Theatre company in Trinidad

Trinidad Theatre Workshop {TTW) was founded in 1959, by 1992 Nobel Laureate Derek Walcott, with his twin brother Roderick Walcott and performers including Beryl McBurnie, Errol Jones and Stanley Marshall, and started at the Little Carib Theatre, before moving to other venues in Port of Spain. Derek Walcott was the founding director, from 1959 to 1971.

In its inaugural season, the Workshop presented The Blacks by Jean Genet, Eric Roach's Belle Fanto, and The Road by Wole Soyinka. The company continues to produce works by Walcott and others (including such diverse dramatists as Dario Fo, Tennessee Williams, Anton Chekhov, Ntozake Shange, Neil Simon, and Athol Fugard among many others), and in recent years has offered educational programmes and community outreach in the region, in addition to its production schedule.

The TTW is known as "The Flagship of the Theatre Movement in the Caribbean".
