= Merchant (calypsonian) =

Dennis Williams Franklyn (1943 – May 19, 1999), better known as The Merchant, was a Trinidad and Tobago calypsonian and songwriter. He was considered one of the most gifted composers in the field. His openness about his HIV+ status helped draw attention to the AIDS epidemic in Trinidad and Tobago.

== Early life ==
Franklyn's mother, Marion, died when he was eleven years old, leaving him an orphan. He was placed in the Belmont Orphanage, where he spent "much of his teenage years". According to composer and media personality Alvin Daniell, Franklyn learned to play guitar while living at Belmont Orphanage, but journalist Laura Dowrich-Phillips references a published account that said he was taught to play guitar by calypsonian the Mighty Sniper while in imprisoned for rape.

Franklyn was later convicted for housebreaking and larceny, but received a four-year suspended sentence after music promoter William Munroe assured the court that he would "turn over a new leaf".

== Career ==
Merchant's first success as a calypsonian came in 1977 with "Um Ba Yo" and "Let No Man Judge". The following year he made it to the finals of the Calypso Monarch Competition with "Norman, Is That You", which was inspired by the 1976 movie, Norman... Is That You?

He made the finals again in 1985 with "Pan in Danger" and "Caribbean Connection". In addition, The Original de Fosto Himself and De Mighty Trini (Robert Elias) made it to the Calypso Monarch finals with calypsos written by Merchant.

He was also a prolific composer. Daniell said that while Merchant had recorded about fifty calypsos, he had written close to 500. Although many of his compositions were uncredited, other singers he is known to have written for included Bally (Errol Ballantyne), Baron, Crazy, Drupatee Ramgoonai, Eddy Grant, and King Austin, and the bands Atlantik and Byron Lee and the Dragonaires.

== Composition and style ==
Alvin Daniell considered Merchant to be among the "top five greatest composers of all time". Louis Regis described him as "incredibly gifted composer—though an indifferent performer".According to Daniel, he was unable to read or write music, and composed lyrics and melody together in his head.

== Personal life ==
Merchant's home, a squatter's shack, was demolished by the government at "four o’ clock in the morning", according to his 1980 calypso "Who Squatting?" The pain of the experience reportedly led him to break down while performing the song. His money problems were exacerbated by his cocaine addiction, so despite the fact that Merchant "was the largest single recipient of royalties" from the Copyright Organisation of Trinidad and Tobago.

According to Ballantyne, while his addiction was at its worst, Merchant was willing to "all but [give] many of his songs" in exchange for quick cash.

Merchant was diagnosed with HIV/AIDS in 1994 when Elias checked him in to a rehabilitation facility, Rebirth House, to help with his cocaine addition. Few people in Trinidad and Tobago were open about their HIV+ status in the 1980s and 1990s, and his openness about his status helped draw attention to the AIDS epidemic.

Merchant died from AIDS-related illness on May 19, 1999.

He was married to Ruthlyn Dickson-Boxhill. Their son, soca artiste Nesta Boxhill, performs under the sobriquet Sekon Sta.

== See also ==
- Godfrey Sealy
