= Love After Love (poem) =

Poem by Derek Walcott

"Love After Love" is a poem by Derek Walcott, included in his Collected Poems, 1948–1984 (1986). NPR's Weekend Edition featured a reading of the poem in March 2017.

== See also ==
- Plays by Derek Walcott
