= Omeros =

1990 epic poem by Derek Walcott

- First edition cover, with illustration by the poet
- Author: Derek Walcott
- Cover artist: Derek Walcott
- Language: English
- Subject: Post-colonialism
- Genre: Epic poetry, World literature, Postmodernism
- Set in: Saint Lucia and Brookline, Massachusetts, late 20th century; also some sequences in the late 18th century
- Publisher: Farrar, Straus & Giroux
- Publication date: 1990
- Publication place: Saint Lucia
- Media type: Print: hardback
- Pages: 325
- ISBN: 9780374225919
- Dewey Decimal: 819.8
- LC Class: PR9272.W3 O44
- Preceded by: The Arkansas Testament
- Followed by: The Bounty
- Website: https://www.faber.co.uk/product/9780571144594-omeros/

Omeros is an epic poem by Saint Lucian writer Derek Walcott, first published in 1990. The work is divided into seven "books" containing a total of sixty-four chapters. Many critics view Omeros as Walcott's finest work.

In 2022, it was included on the "Big Jubilee Read" list of 70 books by Commonwealth authors, selected to celebrate the Platinum Jubilee of Elizabeth II.

== Overview ==
The poem very loosely echoes and references Homer and some of his major characters from the Iliad. Some of the poem's major characters include the island fishermen Achille and Hector, the retired English officer Major Plunkett and his wife Maud, the housemaid Helen, the blind man Seven Seas (who symbolically represents Homer), and the author himself. Although the main narrative of the poem takes place on the island of St. Lucia, where Walcott was born and raised, Walcott also includes scenes from Brookline, Massachusetts (where Walcott was living and teaching at the time of the poem's composition) and the character Achille imagines a voyage from Africa onto a slave ship that's headed for the Americas; also, in Book Five of the poem, Walcott narrates some of his travel experiences in a variety of cities around the world, including Lisbon, London, Dublin, Rome, and Toronto.

The island of Saint Lucia was historically known as "the Helen of the West Indies" during the 18th century because colonial control of the island frequently changed hands between the French and English who fought over the island due to its strategic location vis-à-vis North America. In reference to this appellation, Walcott sometimes personifies the island as if it is a character referred to as "Helen", symbolically tying the island to both the Homeric Helen as well as to the housemaid Helen.

Unlike a conventional epic poem, Walcott divides the narrative between his characters and his own voice so that his epic has no main protagonist or "hero". Moreover, his narrative does not follow a clear, linear path. Instead, Walcott jumps around in time and from character to character without much concern for narrative plotting. These tendencies, combined with Walcott's insertion of himself into the poem, as well as his commentary on his characters as fictional creations, make the poem a postmodernist epic.

Although most of the poem is supposed to take place in the late 20th century, there are sections of the poem that take place in other time periods. For instance, there are chapters that take place in the West Indies in the late 18th century (following the ancestors of the characters Achille and Plunkett). These passages describe the Battle of the Saintes which took place off the coast of St. Lucia in 1782 and ended with the British fleet, under the command of Admiral George Rodney (who appears in the poem), defeating the French. For another example, in Books 4 and 5 of the poem, Walcott also writes about and in the voice of the 19th-century activist Caroline Weldon who worked on behalf of the rights of the Lakota Sioux Indian tribe in the Dakotas.

The plot of Omeros can be divided into three main narrative threads that crisscross throughout the book. The first one follows the Homeric rivalry of Achille and Hector over their love for Helen. There is also a minor character named Philoctete, an injured fisherman, inspired by Homer's Philoctetes. The second thread is the interwoven story of Major Plunkett and his wife Maud, who live on the island and must reconcile themselves to the history of British colonization of St. Lucia. The final thread is the autobiographical narrative of Walcott himself. Walcott, by using myth and history, advocates the need to return to traditions in order to challenge the modernity born out of colonialism.

== Form ==
Through the vast majority of the poem, Walcott uses a three-line form that is reminiscent of the terza rima form that Dante used for the Divine Comedy. However, Walcott's form is much looser than Dante's. His rhyme scheme does not follow a regular pattern like Dante's. Although Walcott claimed in an interview that the poem was written in hexameter, this characterization of the poem's form is inaccurate. Lance Callahan notes that "despite the fact that most lines are composed of twelve syllables, so wildly varied is the metrical construction of the poem that at times it gives the appearance of being in free verse". Jill Gidmark notes that "Walcott's lines are visually, though not metrically, the same length".

For one brief section (Section III) of the opening chapter of Book 4, Walcott breaks completely with the three-line form and writes rhyming couplets in tetrameter.

== Reception ==
Soon after its publication in 1990, Omeros received praise from publications like The Washington Post and The New York Times Book Review, the latter of which chose the book as one of its "Best Books of 1990" and called it "one of Mr. Walcott's finest poetic works." The book also won the WH Smith Literary Award in 1991. In 1992, Walcott was also awarded the Nobel Prize for Literature, and the Nobel committee member who presented the award, Professor Kjell Espmark, singled out Walcott's most recent achievement at the time, Omeros, recognizing the book as a "major work". Walcott painted the cover for the book, which depicts some of his main characters at sea together in a boat. In 2004, the critic Hilton Als of The New Yorker called the book "Walcott's masterpiece" and characterized the poem as "the perfect marriage of Walcott’s classicism and his nativism".

== Stage adaptation ==
Walcott adapted his poem for performance at the Sam Wanamaker Playhouse, Shakespeare's Globe, London. Starring Saint Lucian actor Joseph Marcell and Jade Anouka, it was presented in May and June 2014, and was reprised in October 2015.

== See also ==
- Caribbean literature
- Caribbean poetry
- Epic poetry

== Other sources ==
- Omeros Chart: A guide to Derek Walcott's Omeros
- Podcast of Derek Walcott discussing Omeros on the BBC's World Book Club
- In the Shadows of Divine Perfection By Lance Callahan
- A Companion to Twentieth-Century Poetry: Derek Walcott: Omeros by Bruce Woodcock
- Ambition and Anxiety by Line Henriksen
