= Roderick Walcott =

St Lucian playwright, screenwriter, painter, theatre director (1930–2000)

Roderick Walcott OBE
- Born: Roderick Aldon Walcott; 23 January 1930; Castries, St Lucia
- Died: 6 March 2000 (aged 70); Toronto, Ontario, Canada
- Education: St Mary's College; York University
- Occupations: Playwright, screenwriter, theatre director, costume and set designer
- Relatives: Derek Walcott, twin brother

Roderick Aldon Walcott OBE (23 January 1930 – 6 March 2000) was a St Lucian playwright, screenwriter, painter, theatre director, costume and set designer, lyricist and literary editor. As a dramatist he "has been recognised as one of the most committed figures in the effort to develop a distinctive Caribbean theatre in the region". He was the twin brother of Nobel laureate Derek Walcott.

== Life and career ==
Roderick Aldon Walcott was born in Castries, St Lucia, the son of Alix (Maarlin) and Warwick Walcott. He was educated at St Mary's College there. In 1950, he (together with his brother Derek and friends) was instrumental in founding the St Lucia Arts Guild, to read and perform plays. He wrote, produced and directed plays with the Arts Guild during the 1950s and 1960s, and is regarded as "one of the founders of modern Caribbean theatre", building and fostering a local homegrown audience.

In 1968, he moved to Canada, where he studied Theatre Arts at York University in Toronto from 1969 to 1973. He returned temporarily to St Lucia in 1977 to become the first Director of Culture (1977–80).

He was the author of several plays, many of them published by the Extra-Mural Department of the University of the West Indies. His play The Harrowing of Benjy is the most produced play in the English-speaking Caribbean. He also wrote numerous musicals, of which The Banjo Man, a collaboration with the composer Charles Cadet, was successfully staged at Carifesta 1972 in Guyana and throughout the greater Caribbean. Walcott is also acknowledged as a pioneer of Carnival in St Lucia.

Roderick Walcott died at his home in Toronto, Canada, in 2000 at the age of 70, after a long illness. His death is a theme in his brother Derek's 2004 work The Prodigal.

In 2009, a collection of Roderick Walcott's works was donated to the University of the West Indies Open Campus in St Lucia.

== Awards ==
- 1976 – Officer of the Order of the British Empire
- 2000 – Joseph Devaux Lifetime Achievement Award, Minvielle and Chastanet Fine Arts Award
- 2000 – St. Lucia's Medal of Honour (Gold) for outstanding contribution to Literary and Performing Arts.

== Selected works ==
- The Harrowing of Benjy (1958), Trinidad: UWI Extra-Mural Dept.
- The Banjo Man (196?), Trinidad: UWI Extra-Mural Dept.
- The Legend of Tom Fool (196?), Trinidad: UWI Extra-Mural Dept.
- The Expatriates (196?), Trinidad: UWI Extra-Mural Dept.
- The Image of Canga Brown (196?), Trinidad: UWI Extra-Mural Dept.
- A Flight of Sparrows (196?), Trinidad: UWI Extra-Mural Dept.
- The Education of Alfie (196?), Trinidad: UWI Extra-Mural Dept.
- Malfinis (196?), Trinidad: UWI Extra-Mural Dept.
- The Trouble with Albino Joe (196?), Kingston: UWI Extra-Mural Dept.
- Shrove Tuesday March: a play of the Steelband (196?), Kingston: UWI Extra-Mural Dept.
- Chanson Marianne (1974)
- Romiel et Violette (1979)
- The Guitar Man's Song
- The Wonderful World of Brother Rabbit
