= Dream on Monkey Mountain =

Play by Derek Walcott

Dream on Monkey Mountain is a play by the Nobel Prize-winning St. Lucian poet and playwright Derek Walcott. It was first published in 1970 with a collection of short plays entitled Dream on Monkey Mountain and Other Plays. It was first performed at the Central Library Theatre, Toronto, on 12 August 1967. It was produced and broadcast on NBC in 1970. Produced off-Broadway by the Negro Ensemble Company in 1971, it won an Obie Award that year for "Best Foreign Play".

In a review of the Negro Ensemble production in The New Yorker, the journalist Edith Oliver called the play "a masterpiece" and "a poem in dramatic form or a drama in poetry,” noting that "poetry is rare in modern theater." Like most of Walcott's works, the play is set on a Caribbean island.

The plot centers on the black Makak, who despises himself for being black. After being imprisoned for destroying things in a local market, he has a vision in jail of a white goddess, who pushes him to return to Africa. In his dream, Makak dreams of becoming a great warrior in Africa, convincing others to join him, and receiving support from the Ku Klux Klan. Finally, he beheads the white goddess of his dreams, and wakes up free from his obsession with whiteness. Reconciled to his actual life, Makak begins calling himself by his real name Felix Hobain and resolves to return home to Monkey Mountain.

== Characters ==
Tigre, a felon.

Souris, a felon.

Corporal Lestrade, a mulatto policeman.

Makak, a charcoal burner.

Apparition, who represents at different points the moon, a muse, and a white woman or goddess. The apparition is a dancer who does not speak.

Moustique, a friend of Makak.

Basil, a cabinet-maker dressed like Baron Samedi, who represents death at certain points.

Pamphilion, a market inspector.

A Dancer, also Narrator.

Little Bearers.

Sisters of the Revelation.

Market Women, who are transfigured into Makak's wives during his dream.

Warriors, Demons.

There is also a singer, a male chorus, and two drummers.

== Synopsis ==
After a short epigraph (a quote by Martinican post-colonial political philosopher Frantz Fanon), the play opens with a chorus singing a call-and-response, while dancers cross the stage. Two jail cells appear. One holds Tigre and Souris, black men in jail for thievery, and the other is empty. The biracial Corporal Lestrade appears, dragging Makak, an older black man, whom he throws into the empty cell. Lestrade argues with the other prisoners, whom he views as animals, and then hosts an improvised trial. Makak, tired and confused, just wants to return to his home on Monkey Mountain. He claims an apparition of a white woman inspired him.

Makak dreams of a time before his arrest. His friend Moustique finds Makak on the ground outside his house, recovering from a fit. Moustique encourages Makak to come to the market, where they will sell the coal Makak has produced. Makak remembers a dream in which the apparition of a white woman told him to go back to Africa. Makak announces his desire to do so.

On a country road, Moustique finds a group of people gathered around a sick man. They light hot coals beneath him, hoping to sweat out the illness caused by a snakebite. Moustique offers to fetch his friend, a healer, in exchange for bread and money. The people accept, and Moustique returns with Makak, who performs a healing ceremony. The people are so grateful that they shower Moustique with gifts. Moustique wants to use Makak’s healing power for financial gain, but Makak refuses. They head toward the market.

At the market, Lestrade and an Inspector survey the scene. Rumors of a powerful healer have preceded them. Moustique appears, dressed as Makak, and puts on a show as a healer. When his identity is uncovered, the crowd surrounds him and beats him mercilessly as Lestrade watches. Makak arrives and runs to his stricken friend, but Moustique dies of his injuries, dying in Makak’s arms. Makak falls to the ground in a fit.

After another short epigraph by Frantz Fanon, Makak wakes up in a jail cell again. Lestrade wakes him, along with Tigre and Souris, who notice that Makak has money and decide to rob him. They convince Makak to kill Lestrade, and Makak agrees. He feigns illness and then, using a hidden dagger, stabs Lestrade. Makak releases his fellow prisoners, and they escape into the forest. Lestrade recovers—his wound is only minor—and gives chase. In the forest, Makak’s behavior becomes erratic. He promises to take Tigre and Souris to Africa and make them generals. Makak leads the others into hiding when they hear Lestrade approach. Becoming increasingly distraught, Lestrade repents his sins and joins Makak’s quest. Makak has also convinced Souris, who now also wishes to go to Africa with him. Only Tigre refuses when given the chance to accompany them. In response, Lestrade stabs Tigre. The others leave for Africa, where the Corporal announces that he will enforce the law on behalf of Makak.

A crowd carries Makak into an African court as a conquering king. Lestrade leads the calls for praise, and the crowd responds jubilantly, but Makak is not happy: He sees himself as a hollow ghost of his old self. Lestrade calls prisoners before the king. The first is a list of historical white people, many of whom are already dead. They are condemned for being white and written out of history as punishment. Next, Moustique is dragged before the court and accused of betraying Makak’s dream. Though he pleads with Makak, claiming that Makak has grown mad, old, and blind as king, Makak looks away. Moustique is taken away to be executed. Finally, the apparition of the white woman is brought forth. Lestrade demands her execution as she is a temptation. He hands Makak a sword. Makak insists on privacy, and, when everyone leaves, he executes the apparition.

In the Epilogue, the dream has ended, and Makak is once again in his jail cell. This time, when Lestrade asks him his name, he answers that he is Felix Hobain. He accepts his identity and, when Moustique arrives, Makak and Moustique return happily to Monkey Mountain.
