= Derek Walcott =

Saint Lucian poet and playwright (1930–2017)

The Honourable Sir Derek Walcott KCSL OBE OM OCC
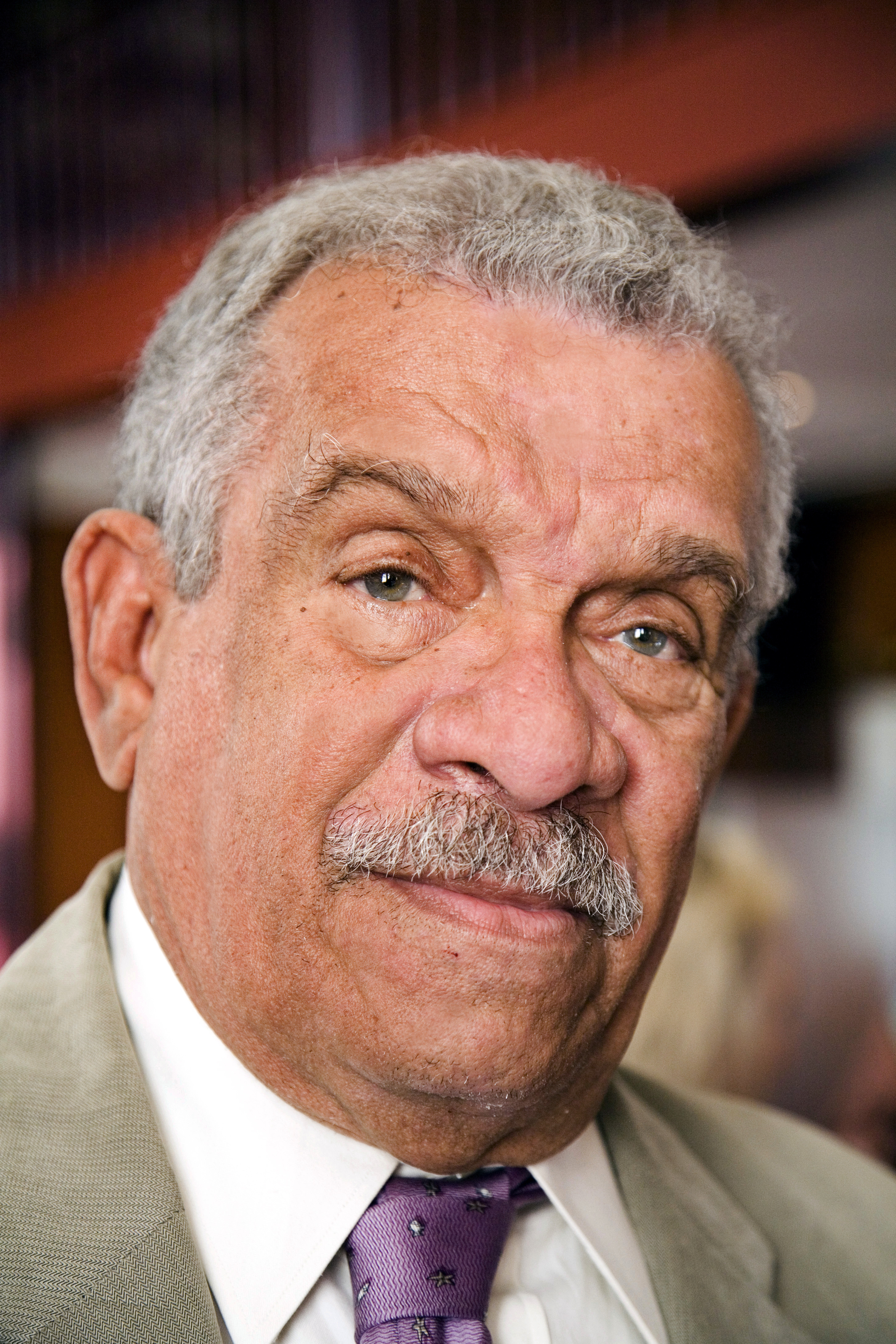
- Walcott at an honorary dinner in Amsterdam, 20 May 2008
- Born: Derek Alton Walcott; 23 January 1930; Castries, Colony of Saint Lucia, British Windward Islands, British Empire
- Died: 17 March 2017 (aged 87); Cap Estate, Gros-Islet, Saint Lucia
- Education: University College of the West Indies
- Occupations: Poet, playwright, professor
- Children: 3, including Elizabeth Walcott-Hackshaw
- Writing career
- Genres: Poetry and plays
- Notable works: Dream on Monkey Mountain (1967), Omeros (1990), White Egrets (2007)
- Notable awards: Nobel Prize in Literature; 1992; T. S. Eliot Prize; 2010; OCM Bocas Prize for Caribbean Literature; 2011
- Movement: Postcolonialism

Sir Derek Alton Walcott (23 January 1930 – 17 March 2017) was a Saint Lucian poet and playwright.

He received the 1992 Nobel Prize in Literature. His works include the Homeric epic poem Omeros (1990), which many critics view "as Walcott's major achievement." In addition to winning the Nobel Prize, Walcott received many literary awards over the course of his career, including the Guinness Award for Poetry in 1961 for his poem "A Sea-Chantey", the WH Smith Literary Award, an Obie Award in 1971 for his play Dream on Monkey Mountain, a MacArthur Foundation "genius" award, a Royal Society of Literature Award, the Queen's Medal for Poetry, the inaugural OCM Bocas Prize for Caribbean Literature, the 2010 T. S. Eliot Prize for his book of poetry White Egrets and the Griffin Trust For Excellence in Poetry Lifetime Recognition Award in 2015.

== Early life and childhood ==
Walcott was born and raised in Castries, Saint Lucia, in the West Indies, the son of Alix (Maarlin) and Warwick Walcott. He had a twin brother, the playwright Roderick Walcott, and a sister, Pamela Walcott. His family is of English, Dutch and African descent, reflecting the complex colonial history of the island that he explores in his poetry. His mother, a teacher, loved the arts and often recited poetry around the house. His father was a civil servant and a talented painter, who died when Walcott and his brother were one year old.

The young Walcott attended a Methodist elementary school where his mother was head teacher, and she provided her children with an environment where their talents could be nurtured. Walcott's family was part of a minority Methodist community. They felt overshadowed by the dominant Catholic culture of the island established during French colonial rule. Walcott's secondary school was the Catholic St. Mary's College.

As a young man, he trained as a painter, mentored by Harold Simmons, whose life as a professional artist provided an inspiring example for him. Walcott greatly admired Cézanne and Giorgione and sought to learn from them. Walcott's painting was later exhibited at the Anita Shapolsky Gallery in New York City, along with the art of other writers, in a 2007 exhibition named The Writer's Brush: Paintings and Drawing by Writers.

He studied as a writer, becoming "an elated, exuberant poet madly in love with English" and strongly influenced by modernist poets such as T. S. Eliot and Ezra Pound. Walcott had an early sense of a vocation as a writer. In the poem "Midsummer" (1984), he wrote:

Forty years gone, in my island childhood, I felt that
the gift of poetry had made me one of the chosen,
that all experience was kindling to the fire of the Muse.

At 14, Walcott published his first poem, a Miltonic, religious poem, in the newspaper The Voice of St Lucia. An English Catholic priest condemned the Methodist-inspired poem as blasphemous in a response printed in the newspaper. By the age of 19, Walcott had self-published his first two collections with the aid of his mother, who paid for the printing: 25 Poems (1948) and Epitaph for the Young: XII Cantos (1949). He sold copies to his friends and covered the costs.

He later commented:

I went to my mother and said, "I'd like to publish a book of poems, and I think it's going to cost me two hundred dollars." She was just a seamstress and a schoolteacher, and I remember her being very upset because she wanted to do it. Somehow she got it—a lot of money for a woman to have found on her salary. She gave it to me, and I sent off to Trinidad and had the book printed. When the books came back I would sell them to friends. I made the money back.

The influential Barbadian poet Frank Collymore critically supported Walcott's early work.

After attending high school at Saint Mary's College, Walcott received a scholarship to study at the University College of the West Indies in Kingston, Jamaica.

== Career ==
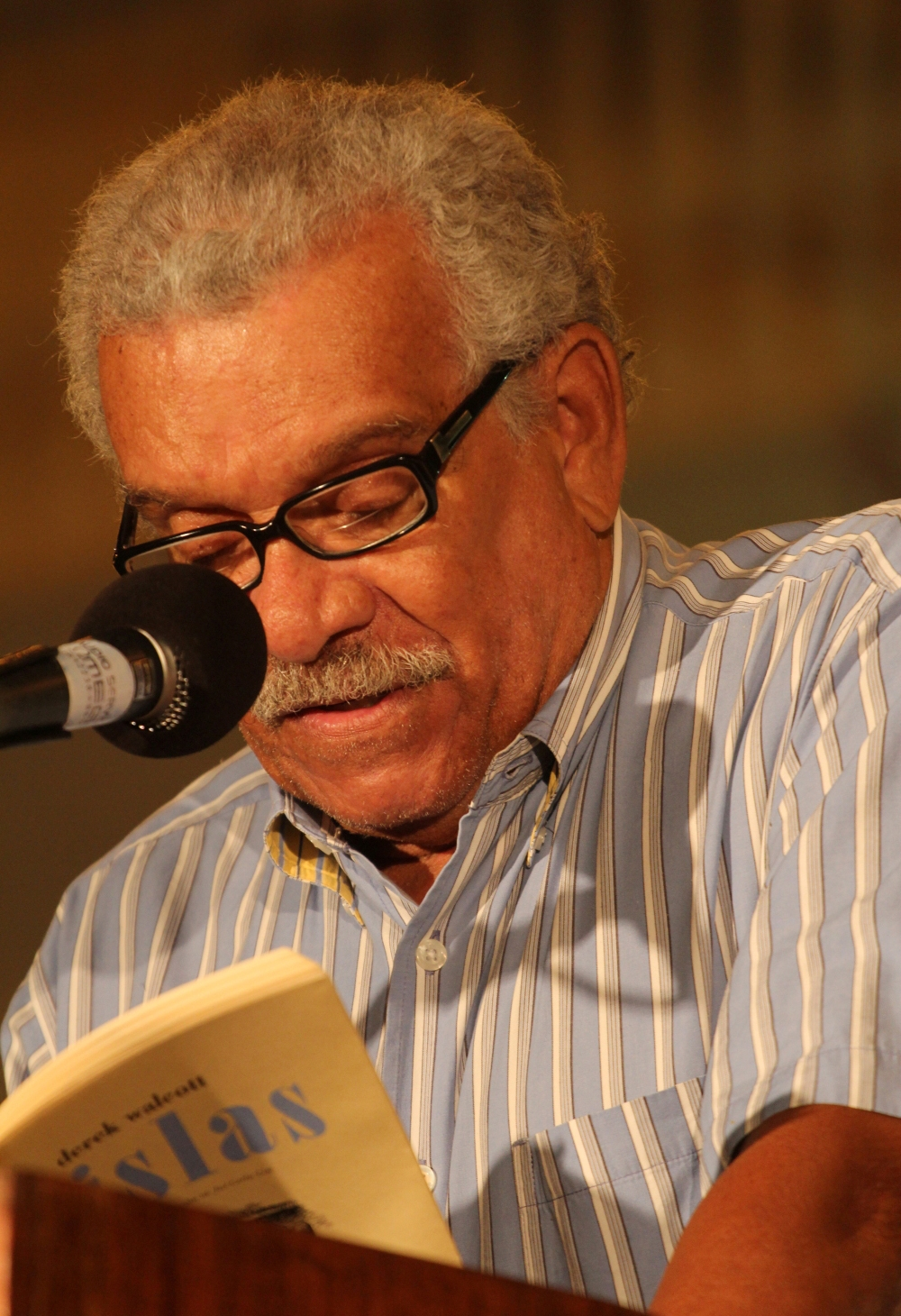
Walcott at VIII Festival Internacional, 1992

Derek Walcott reciting his poem "names"

After graduation, Walcott moved to Trinidad in 1953, where he became a critic, teacher and journalist. He founded the Trinidad Theatre Workshop in 1959 as the Little Carib Theatre Workshop. The company, now internationally recognized, has toured the United States with performances including the 1995 productions of Walcott's Elliot Norton Award-winning The Joker of Seville and Dream on Monkey Mountain. He remained active with its board of directors.

Exploring the Caribbean and its history in a colonialist and post-colonialist context, his collection In a Green Night: Poems 1948–1960 (1962) attracted international attention. His play Dream on Monkey Mountain (1970) was produced on NBC-TV in the United States the year it was published. Makak is the protagonist in this play; and "Makak's condition represents the condition of the colonized natives under the oppressive forces of the powerful colonizers". In 1971, it was produced by the Negro Ensemble Company off-Broadway in New York City; it won an Obie Award that year for "Best Foreign Play". In the United Kingdom's 1972 New Year Honours, Walcott was appointed an Officer of the Most Excellent Order of the British Empire (OBE) for services to literature and drama in St. Lucia.

He was hired as a teacher by Boston University in the United States, where he established the Boston Playwrights' Theatre in 1981 as the Little Carib Theatre. The initiative was made possible through assistance from the University and the MacArthur Foundation Award. He became its first Artistic Director.

Walcott taught literature and writing at Boston University for more than two decades, publishing new books of poetry and plays on a regular basis. He retired from his position at Boston University in 2007.

Through the years, Walcott had become friends with other poets, including the Russian expatriate Joseph Brodsky, who lived and worked in the U.S. after being exiled in the 1970s; and the Irishman Seamus Heaney, who also taught in Boston.

Walcott's epic poem Omeros (1990), which loosely echoes and refers to characters from the Iliad, has been critically praised as his "major achievement." The book was praised by such publications as The Washington Post and The New York Times Book Review, which chose Omeros as one of its "Best Books of 1990".

Walcott was awarded the Nobel Prize in Literature in 1992, the second Caribbean writer to receive the honour after Saint-John Perse, who was born in Guadeloupe, and received the award in 1960. The Nobel committee described Walcott's work as "a poetic oeuvre of great luminosity, sustained by a historical vision, the outcome of a multicultural commitment", with the jury report praising him as the "Caribbean Homer". In 2004, he won an Anisfield-Wolf Book Award for Lifetime Achievement.

His later poetry collections include Tiepolo's Hound (2000), illustrated with copies of his watercolours; The Prodigal (2004), and White Egrets (2010), which received the T. S. Eliot Prize and the 2011 OCM Bocas Prize for Caribbean Literature.

Derek Walcott held the Elias Ghanem Chair in Creative Writing at the University of Nevada, Las Vegas, in 2007. In 2008, Walcott gave the first Cola Debrot Lectures. In 2009, Walcott began a three-year scholar-in-residence position at the University of Alberta. In 2010, he became Professor of Poetry at the University of Essex.

Walcott was made one of the first knights of the Order of Saint Lucia during the country's Independence Day celebrations, in February 2016.

== Writing ==
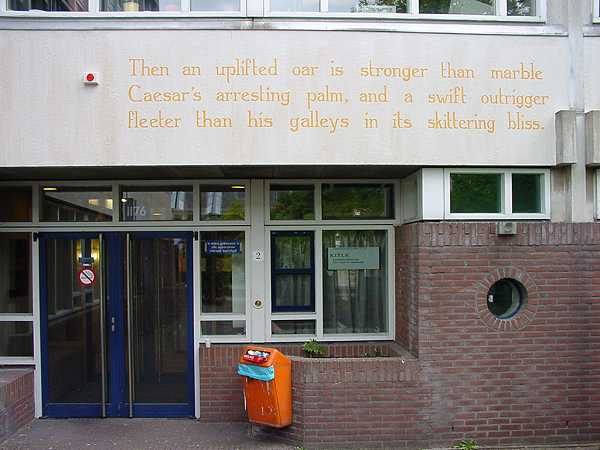
Wall poem "Omeros" in Leiden

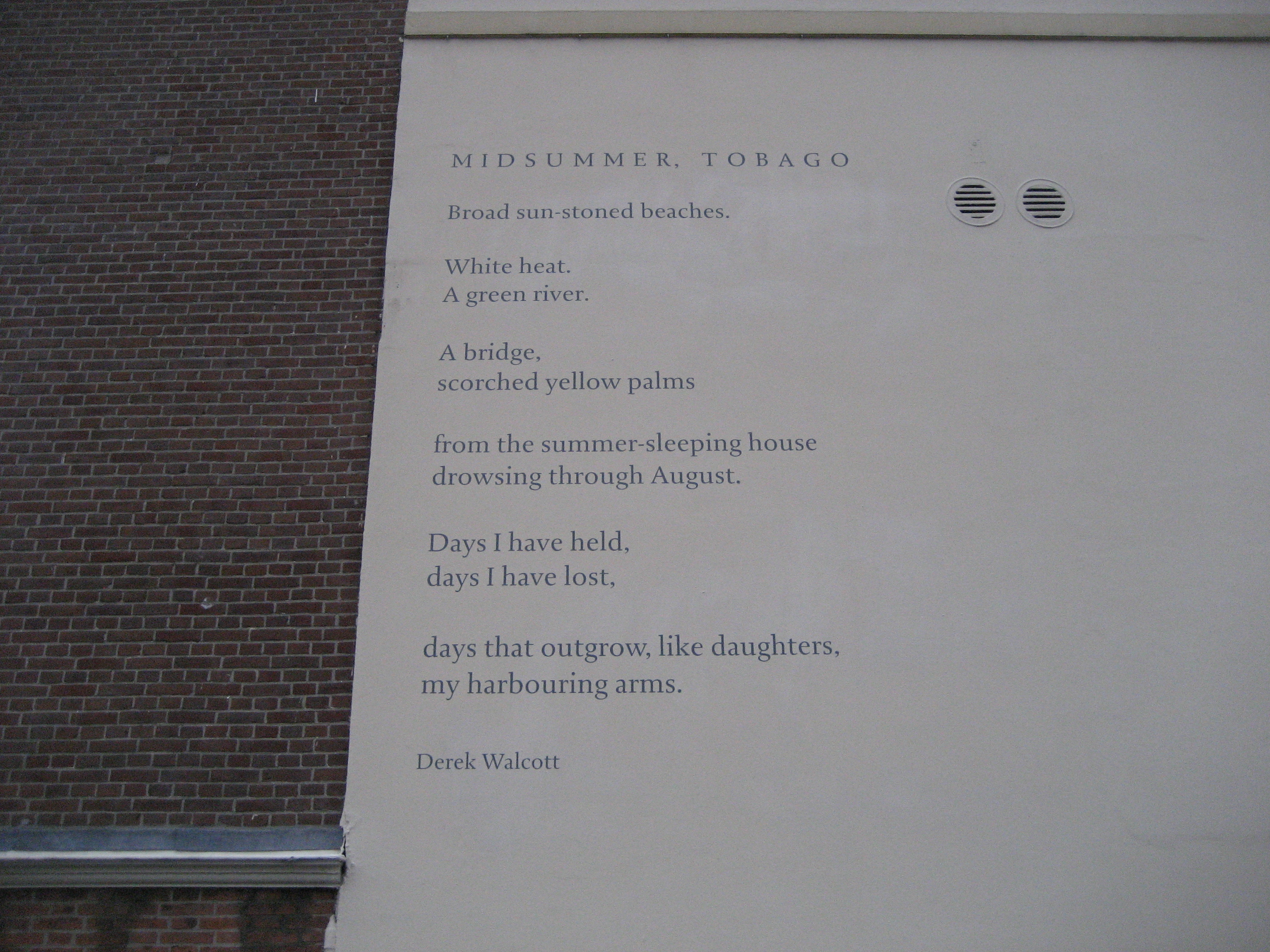
Wall poem "Midsummer, Tobago" in The Hague

=== Themes ===
Methodism and spirituality have played a significant role from the beginning in Walcott's work. He commented: "I have never separated the writing of poetry from prayer. I have grown up believing it is a vocation, a religious vocation." Describing his writing process, he wrote: "the body feels it is melting into what it has seen… the 'I' not being important. That is the ecstasy... Ultimately, it's what Yeats says: 'Such a sweetness flows into the breast that we laugh at everything and everything we look upon is blessed.' That's always there. It's a benediction, a transference. It's gratitude, really. The more of that a poet keeps, the more genuine his nature." He also notes: "if one thinks a poem is coming on... you do make a retreat, a withdrawal into some kind of silence that cuts out everything around you. What you're taking on is really not a renewal of your identity but actually a renewal of your anonymity."

=== Influences ===
Walcott said that his writing was influenced by the work of the American poets Robert Lowell and Elizabeth Bishop, who were also friends.

=== Playwriting ===
He published more than twenty plays, the majority of which have been produced by the Trinidad Theatre Workshop and have also been widely staged elsewhere. Many of them address, either directly or indirectly, the liminal status of the West Indies in the post-colonial period. Through poetry, Walcott also explores the paradoxes and complexities of this legacy.

=== Essays ===
In his 1970 essay "What the Twilight Says: An Overture", discussing art and theatre in his native region (from Dream on Monkey Mountain and Other Plays), Walcott reflects on the West Indies as a colonized space. He discusses the problems for an artist of a region with little in the way of truly Indigenous forms, and with little national or nationalist identity. He states: "We are all strangers here... Our bodies think in one language and move in another". The epistemological effects of colonization inform plays such as Ti-Jean and his Brothers. Mi-Jean, one of the eponymous brothers, is shown to have much information but truly knows nothing. Every line Mi-Jean recites is rote knowledge gained from the coloniser; he is unable to synthesize it or apply it to his life as a colonised person.

Walcott notes of growing up in West Indian culture:

What we were deprived of was also our privilege. There was a great joy in making a world that so far, up to then, had been undefined... My generation of West Indian writers has felt such a powerful elation at having the privilege of writing about places and people for the first time and, simultaneously, having behind them the tradition of knowing how well it can be done—by a Defoe, a Dickens, a Richardson.

Walcott identified as "absolutely a Caribbean writer", a pioneer, helping to make sense of the legacy of deep colonial damage. In such poems as "The Castaway" (1965) and in the play Pantomime (1978), he uses the metaphors of shipwreck and Crusoe to describe the culture and what is required of artists after colonialism and slavery: both the freedom and the challenge to begin again, salvage the best of other cultures and make something new. These images recur in later work as well. He writes: "If we continue to sulk and say, Look at what the slave-owner did, and so forth, we will never mature. While we sit moping or writing morose poems and novels that glorify a non-existent past, then time passes us by."

== Omeros ==
Walcott's epic book-length poem Omeros was published in 1990 to critical acclaim. The poem very loosely echoes and references Homer and some of his major characters from The Iliad. Some of the poem's major characters include the island fishermen Achille and Hector, the retired English officer Major Plunkett and his wife Maud, the housemaid Helen, the blind man Seven Seas (who symbolically represents Homer), and the author himself.

Although the main narrative of the poem takes place on the island of St. Lucia, where Walcott was born and raised, Walcott also includes scenes from Brookline, Massachusetts (where he was living and teaching at the time of the poem's composition), and the character Achille imagines a voyage from Africa onto a slave ship that is headed for the Americas; also, in Book Five of the poem, Walcott narrates some of his travel experiences in a variety of cities around the world, including Lisbon, London, Dublin, Rome, and Toronto.

Composed in a variation on terza rima, the work explores the themes that run throughout Walcott's oeuvre: the beauty of the islands, the colonial burden, the fragmentation of Caribbean identity, and the role of the poet in a post-colonial world.

In this epic, Walcott speaks in favour of unique Caribbean cultures and traditions to challenge the modernity that existed as a consequence of colonialism.

=== Reception ===
Walcott's work has received praise from major poets including Robert Graves, who wrote that Walcott "handles English with a closer understanding of its inner magic than most, if not any, of his contemporaries", and Joseph Brodsky, who praised Walcott's work, writing: "For almost forty years his throbbing and relentless lines kept arriving in the English language like tidal waves, coagulating into an archipelago of poems without which the map of modern literature would effectively match wallpaper. He gives us more than himself or 'a world'; he gives us a sense of infinity embodied in the language." Walcott noted that he, Brodsky, and the Irish poet Seamus Heaney, who all taught in the United States, were a band of poets "outside the American experience".

The poetry critic William Logan critiqued Walcott's work in a New York Times book review of Walcott's Selected Poems. While he praised Walcott's writing in Sea Grapes and The Arkansas Testament, Logan had mostly negative things to say about Walcott's poetry, calling Omeros "clumsy" and Another Life "pretentious". Logan concluded with: "No living poet has written verse more delicately rendered or distinguished than Walcott, though few individual poems seem destined to be remembered."

Most reviews of Walcott's work are more positive. For instance, in The New Yorker review of The Poetry of Derek Walcott, Adam Kirsch had high praise for Walcott's oeuvre, describing his style in the following manner:

By combining the grammar of vision with the freedom of metaphor, Walcott produces a beautiful style that is also a philosophical style. People perceive the world on dual channels, Walcott's verse suggests, through the senses and through the mind, and each is constantly seeping into the other. The result is a state of perpetual magical thinking, a kind of Alice in Wonderland world where concepts have bodies and landscapes are always liable to get up and start talking.

Kirsch calls Another Life Walcott's "first major peak" and analyzes the painterly qualities of Walcott's imagery from his earliest work through to later books such as Tiepolo's Hound. Kirsch also explores the post-colonial politics in Walcott's work, calling him "the postcolonial writer par excellence". Kirsch calls the early poem "A Far Cry from Africa" a turning point in Walcott's development as a poet. Like Logan, Kirsch is critical of Omeros, which he believes Walcott fails to successfully sustain over its entirety. Although Omeros is the volume of Walcott's that usually receives the most critical praise, Kirsch believes Midsummer to be his best book.

In 2013, Dutch filmmaker Ida Does released Poetry is an Island, a feature documentary film about Walcott's life and the ever-present influence of his birthplace of St Lucia.

== Personal life ==
In 1954, Walcott married Fay Moston, a secretary, and they had a son, the St. Lucian painter Peter Walcott. The marriage ended in divorce in 1959. Walcott married a second time to Margaret Maillard in 1962, who worked as an almoner in a hospital. Together they had two daughters, Elizabeth Walcott-Hackshaw and Anna Walcott-Hardy, before divorcing in 1976. In 1976, Walcott married for a third time, to actress Norline Metivier; they divorced in 1993. His companion until his death was Sigrid Nama, a former art gallery owner.

Walcott was known for his passion for traveling around the world. He split his time between New York, Boston, and St. Lucia, and incorporated the influences of different locations into his pieces of work.

== Allegations of sexual harassment ==
In 1982, a Harvard sophomore accused Walcott of sexual harassment in September 1981. She alleged that after she refused a sexual advance from him, she was given the only C in the class. In 1996, a student at Boston University sued Walcott for sexual harassment and "offensive sexual physical contact". The two reached a settlement.

In 2009, Walcott was a leading candidate for the position of Oxford Professor of Poetry. He withdrew his candidacy after reports of the accusations against him of sexual harassment from 1981 and 1996.

When the media learned that pages from an American book on the topic were sent anonymously to a number of Oxford academics, this aroused their interest in the university's decisions. Ruth Padel, also a leading candidate, was elected to the post. Within days, The Daily Telegraph reported that she had alerted journalists to the harassment cases. Under severe media and academic pressure, Padel resigned. Padel was the first woman to be elected to the Oxford post, and some journalists attributed the criticism of her to misogyny and a gender war at Oxford. They said that a male poet would not have been so criticized, as she had reported published information, not a rumour.

Numerous respected poets, including Seamus Heaney and Al Alvarez, published a letter of support for Walcott in The Times Literary Supplement, and criticized the press furore. Other commentators suggested that both poets were casualties of the media interest in an internal university affair because the story "had everything, from sex claims to allegations of character assassination". Simon Armitage and other poets expressed regret at Padel's resignation.

== Death ==
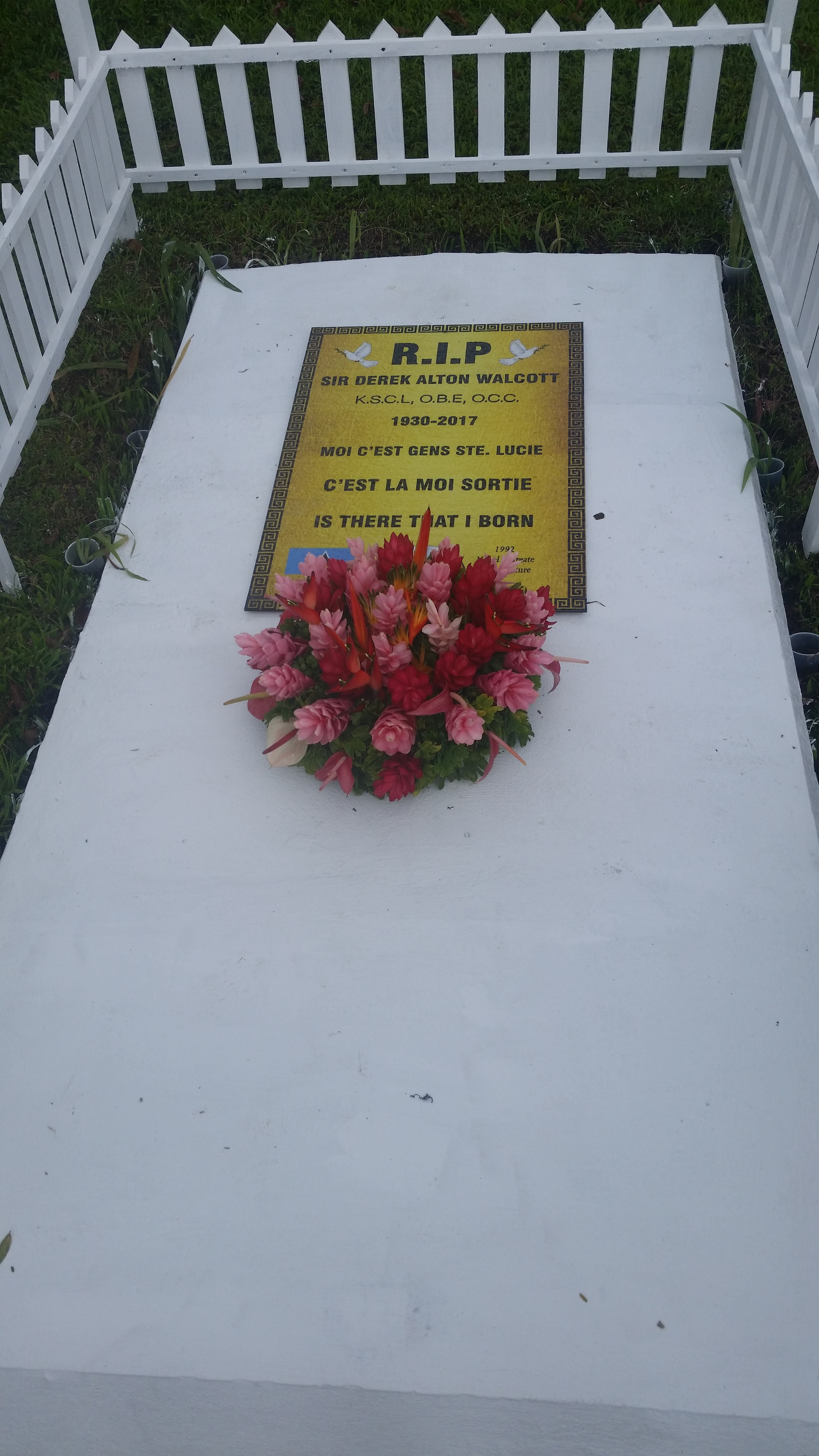
Walcott's grave on Morne Fortune, St. Lucia

Walcott died at his home in Cap Estate, St. Lucia, on 17 March 2017. He was 87 years old. He was given a state funeral on Saturday, 25 March, with a service at the Cathedral Basilica of the Immaculate Conception in Castries and burial at Morne Fortune.

== Legacy ==
In 1993, a public square and park located in central Castries, Saint Lucia, was named Derek Walcott Square. A documentary film, Poetry Is an Island: Derek Walcott, by filmmaker Ida Does, was produced to honour him and his legacy in 2013.

The Derek Walcott Collection is hosted by the main library of the University of the West Indies St. Augustine Campus, Trinidad. It contains Walcott's manuscripts, correspondence, unpublished works, diaries, and notebooks. In 1997, it was added by UNESCO to the Memory of the World international register, recognising it as globally important documentary heritage.

The Saint Lucia National Trust acquired Walcott's childhood home at 17 Chaussée Road, Castries, in November 2015, renovating it before opening it to the public as Walcott House in January 2016.

In 2019, Arrowsmith Press, in partnership with The Derek Walcott Festival in Port-of-Spain, Trinidad, and the Boston Playwrights' Theatre, began awarding the annual Derek Walcott Prize for Poetry to a full-length book of poems by a living poet who is not a US citizen published in the previous calendar year.

In January 2020, the Sir Arthur Lewis Community College in St. Lucia announced that Walcott's books on Caribbean Literature and poetry have been donated to its Library.

== Awards and honours ==
- 1961: Guinness Award for Poetry (for "A Sea Chantey")
- 1969: Cholmondeley Award
- 1971: Obie Award for Best Foreign Play (for Dream on Monkey Mountain)
- 1972: Officer of the Order of the British Empire
- 1981: MacArthur Foundation Fellowship ("genius award")
- 1988: Queen's Gold Medal for Poetry
- 1990: Arts Council of Wales International Writers Prize
- 1990: WH Smith Literary Award (for poetry Omeros)
- 1992: Nobel Prize in Literature
- 2004: Anisfield-Wolf Book Award for Lifetime Achievement
- 2008: Honorary doctorate from the University of Essex
- 2011: T. S. Eliot Prize (for poetry collection White Egrets)
- 2011: OCM Bocas Prize for Caribbean Literature (for White Egrets)
- 2015: Griffin Trust For Excellence in Poetry Lifetime Recognition Award
- 2016: Knight Commander of the Order of Saint Lucia

== List of works ==
- Works by Derek Walcott at Open Library

=== Poetry collections ===
- 1948: 25 Poems
- 1949: Epitaph for the Young: Xll Cantos
- 1951: Poems
- 1962: In a Green Night: Poems 1948—60
- 1964: Selected Poems
- 1965: The Castaway and Other Poems
- 1969: The Gulf and Other Poems
- 1973: Another Life
- 1976: Sea Grapes
- 1979: The Star-Apple Kingdom
- 1981: Selected Poetry
- 1981: The Fortunate Traveller
- 1983: The Caribbean Poetry of Derek Walcott and the Art of Romare Bearden
- 1984: Midsummer
- 1986: Collected Poems, 1948–1984, featuring "Love After Love"
- 1987: The Arkansas Testament
- 1990: Omeros
- 1997: The Bounty
- 2000: Tiepolo's Hound, includes Walcott's watercolors
- 2004: The Prodigal
- 2007: Selected Poems (edited, selected and with an introduction by Edward Baugh)
- 2010: White Egrets
- 2014: The Poetry of Derek Walcott 1948–2013
- 2016: Morning, Paramin (illustrated by Peter Doig)

=== Plays ===
- 1950: Henri Christophe: A Chronicle in Seven Scenes
- 1952: Harry Dernier: A Play for Radio Production
- 1953: Wine of the Country
- 1954: The Sea at Dauphin: A Play in One Act
- 1957: Ione
- 1958: Drums and Colours: An Epic Drama
- 1958: Ti-Jean and His Brothers
- 1966: Malcochon: or, Six in the Rain
- 1967: Dream on Monkey Mountain
- 1970: In a Fine Castle
- 1974: The Joker of Seville
- 1974: The Charlatan
- 1976: O Babylon!
- 1977: Remembrance
- 1978: Pantomime
- 1980: The Joker of Seville and O Babylon!: Two Plays
- 1982: The Isle Is Full of Noises
- 1984: The Haitian Earth
- 1986: Three Plays: The Last Carnival, Beef, No Chicken and A Branch of the Blue Nile
- 1991: Steel
- 1993: Odyssey: A Stage Version
- 1997: The Capeman (book and lyrics, both in collaboration with Paul Simon)
- 2002: Walker and The Ghost Dance
- 2011: Moon-Child
- 2014: O Starry Starry Night

=== Other books ===
- 1990: The Poet in the Theatre, Poetry Book Society (London)
- 1993: The Antilles: Fragments of Epic Memory (New York: Farrar, Straus & Giroux)
- 1996: Conversations with Derek Walcott (Jackson, MS: University of Mississippi)
- 1996: (With Joseph Brodsky and Seamus Heaney) Homage to Robert Frost (New York: Farrar, Straus & Giroux)
- 1998: What the Twilight Says (essays), (New York: Farrar, Straus & Giroux)
- 2002: Walker and Ghost Dance (New York: Farrar, Straus & Giroux)
- 2004: Another Life: Fully Annotated, Boulder, CO: Lynne Rienner Publishers

== See also ==
- Black Nobel Prize laureates
- "Love After Love", a poem by Derek Walcott
- Caribbean Epic
