= Little Carib Theatre =

Folk-dance company and theatre in Trinidad

The Little Carib Theatre (LCT) was established in Woodbrook, Port of Spain, Trinidad, in 1947 by Beryl McBurnie (1913–2000) "to showcase the vibrant and rich culture of the Trinbagonian people". The first permanent folk-dance company and theatre in Trinidad, it has been described as "the mecca of West Indian folk dance". It remains the only dance theatre of its kind in the region.

== History ==
The Little Carib Theatre was formally opened in November 1948. The foundation stone was laid by Paul Robeson, who at the time was visiting Trinidad, and whom the founder Beryl McBurnie had met in New York.

By the 1960s, the work of the Little Carib Dance Company had been recognised and celebrated overseas, having been performed at such events as the Caribbean Festival of Arts in Puerto Rico in 1952, the Jamaica Tercentenary Celebrations in 1955 and the opening of the Federal Parliament of Toronto in April 1958. The Little Carib building had to be demolished in the 1960s, and it was rebuilt in three years.

Many of the plays of Nobel Prize-winner Derek Walcott were first staged at the Little Carib Theatre, where he held weekly theatre workshops as founding director, from 1959 to 1971, of what became the Trinidad Theatre Workshop.

== Legacy ==
To commemorate the Little Carib Theatre's 75th anniversary, an exhibition was shown in the atrium of the National Library of Trinidad and Tobago in March 2023 – which month also marked the 23rd anniversary of founder Beryl McBurnie's death.
