= Beryl McBurnie =

Trinidadian dancer (1913–2000)

Beryl McBurnie OBE
- Born: Beryl Eugenia McBurnie; 2 November 1913; Port-of-Spain, Trinidad
- Died: 30 March 2000 (aged 86); Port-of-Spain, Trinidad and Tobago
- Other name: La Belle Rosette
- Education: Columbia University, New York
- Known for: Dance, choreography, dance instruction
- Notable work: The Little Carib Theatre
- Movement: Promotion of Dance, Arts and Culture of Trinidad & Tobago
- Awards: Doctor of Laws, University of the West Indies; Hummingbird Gold Medal (Republic of Trinidad and Tobago); Trinity Cross (Republic of Trinidad and Tobago)
- Patrons: Katharine Dunham, Martha Graham, Paul Robeson, Sam Manning, Carmen Miranda, Charles Weidman, Louise Crane, Doris Humphrey

Beryl Eugenia McBurnie OBE (2 November 1913 – 30 March 2000) was a Trinidadian dancer, who also performed as La Belle Rosette. She established the Little Carib Theatre in Woodbrook, Port of Spain, and promoted the culture and arts of Trinidad and Tobago as her life's work. She helped to promote the cultural legitimacy of Trinidad and Tobago that would shift the country into the age of independence. McBurnie dedicated her life to dance, becoming one of the greatest influences on modern Trinidadian pop culture.

== Early life ==
Beryl McBurnie was born in Woodbrook, Port of Spain, and was educated at Tranquillity Girls' Intermediate School. When she was eight years old, she was invited to recite the "Sycamore Tree" for a charity concert in the district. Soon after that, she set about gathering children from the neighbourhood to form a group, which would present concerts. The first concert planned did not take place, but she and her friends tried again, borrowing chairs from neighbours. This time the performance was well appreciated and this successful venture encouraged her to continue.

Though she appreciated their beauty, she yearned for more. In her teens, she decided to focus on promoting "the emotions of the folk, and which in some cases gave an insight into the history and the way of life of the ordinary people."

== Rise to prominence ==
On leaving Tranquility Girls School, McBurnie became a teacher and used this opportunity to engage in the extracurricular activities surrounding the preparation for school concerts, play productions and operettas. She danced at every opportunity that came her way, at the same time becoming quite accomplished at piano and in the use of voice.

She trained at Mausica Teachers' College and started her career teaching in Port-of-Spain. She instead decided to pursue her dream career in folk-dance after touring the country with Trinidad's leading folklorist, Andrew Carr. Many melodies and folk dances that would have been lost to Trinidad and Tobago were rescued by McBurnie and promoted in her dancing. In 1938, she enrolled at Teachers CollegeColumbia University in New York and studied dance with dance pioneer Martha Graham. McBurnie also worked with American modern dancer and choreographer Charles Weidman, African-American choreographer Katharine Dunham, and studied eurhythmics with Elisa Findlay - a student of Emile Jacques Dalcroze. McBurnie also taught Trinidadian dance at the New Dance Group

McBurnie was the first person to promote primitive and Caribbean dance. In 1938, when Katherine Dunham arrived in New York from Chicago, McBurnie taught her privately the rhythms and dances of the West Indies. During these sessions, she taught Dunham ritual chants and from the Shango of Trinidad and dances such as the Bongo - a dance done at wakes - and Kalinda, a dance between two opponents using sticks in a mock battle.

In 1940, McBurnie enjoyed a brief return to Trinidad. She presented A Trip Through the Tropics at the Empire Theatre, Port of Spain. McBurnie combined Caribbean and Brazilian dances with interpretations of New York and modern dances, performed to the music of Wagner, Beethoven and Bach, to a packed audience. Her performances sold out.

"Willie Willie", one of the Soundies featuring Manning and McBurnie

McBurnie returned to New York in 1941 and stayed there until 1945. During that time, she began teaching classes in West Indian dance and she organized the material in an educational yet attractive package which she used in a series of lecture demonstrations and lecture recitals. She also danced and sang with Sam Manning and his ensemble, in the production of the only known calypso "soundies" film clips made for film jukeboxes located in restaurants and bars. She became a popular teacher at the New Dance Group, where in 1942 Pearl Primus was a student. Primus, like Katherine Dunham, studied West Indian dance from McBurnie and joined the group, which appeared at various venues in New York.

In 1941, McBurnie assumed a pseudonym name "La Belle Rosette" and performed professionally under that stage name. She was booked to perform at "coffee concerts" at the Museum of Modern Art by philanthropist Louise Crane, then a young theatrical agent. The poet H.D. wrote a very positive review of her "coffee concert" showing. After her "coffee concert" performances, "La Belle Rosette" performed at the Brooklyn Academy of Music and the 92nd Street Y alongside American dancers Doris Humphrey and Martha Graham. . In June 1942 McBurnie replaced Carmen Miranda in the hit Broadway musical revue Sons o' Fun at the Winter Garden Theatre. A review of her performance in the People voice of New York, a reporter wrote “Belle Rosette the talented Trinidadian performer scheduled to take Carmen Miranda’s role in the hit show Son O’Fun...amply proved to an enthusiastic audience at the Y.M.H.A on Sunday evening, that she has ‘what it takes’-in the Broadway parlance." Between 1942 and 1945, McBurnie made several appearances at places such as Hunter College, Henry Street Settlement Playhouse in New York, Madison Square Gardens, The Village Gate and New York City College. During that time, she also completed two further study periods at Columbia, where she studied Dramatic Arts, Painting, Music and other Creative Arts courses that she considered important for her work. The following year, she made a film appearance with the Trinidadian vocalist Sam Manning in Quarry Road.

== Creation of The Little Carib Theatre ==
McBurnie left the United States in 1945 at the height of her popularity in New York to become a dance instructor with the Trinidad and Tobago government's Education Department in 1945. In 1948 she established the first permanent folk-dance company and theatre in Trinidad. Her first show was Bele (pronounced Bay-lay) pre-carnival 1948 at her newly opened Little Carib Theatre in Woodbrook. Paul Robeson laid the cornerstone of the building during a tour of the Caribbean in 1948. Among the many highlights of her work from this period were Talking Drums; Carnival Bele, in which the j'ouvert ballet danced to a steel band; Sugar Ballet; Caribbean Cruise; and Parang. She is considered to be one of the foremothers of Parang music.

By the 1960s, the work of the Little Carib Dance Company had been recognised and celebrated overseas, performing at such events as the Caribbean Festival of Arts in Puerto Rico in 1952, the Jamaica Tercentenary Celebrations in 1955 and the opening of the Federal Parliament of Toronto in April 1958. In fact, the celebration in Canada in 1958 would influence the way Caribbean culture was understood in Canada. Her performances in Canada helped pave the way for Canada's Caribana festival in the 1960s. In 1965 the Little Carib building, no longer safe in Port-of-Spain, had to be closed down and was re-built in three years. However the permanent dance troupe had disbanded and McBurnie instead focused her energies on teaching children.

== Recognition and passing ==
In 1950, McBurnie was appointed the director of dance in the Education Department. The British Council sent her on a dance tour of England and Europe. In 1959 she was appointed OBE, and in 1969 she was presented with the Hummingbird Gold Medal of Trinidad and Tobago. In 1976, the University of the West Indies conferred on her the honorary degree of Doctor of Laws and in America in 1978 she was honoured along with Katharine Dunham and Pearl Primus at the Twentieth Anniversary Gala of the Alvin Ailey Theater. In 1989, McBurnie received the Trinity Cross, the highest national award in Trinidad and Tobago then, for Promotion of the Arts. She died on 30 March 2000.
