= Henri Christophe: A Chronicle in Seven Scenes =

1949 play by Derek Walcott

Henri Christophe: A Chronicle in Seven Scenes (1949) is the first play by Derek Walcott, written when he was 19 years old. It is about the self-declared King Henri Christophe of Haiti, a former slave who became a general under Toussaint Louverture in the Haitian Revolution. Later, he ruled the northern part of the nation from 1807 to 1820, first as president and from 1811 as king. At the time the South was governed by the president Alexandre Pétion, a gens de couleur (free man of color; in Haiti, such people were generally of French and African descent).

The play was first produced in 1952 in London, by Errol Hill and in 1954 at the University College of the West Indies. In 1968, it was revived at the Trinidad and Tobago Festival.

== Bibliography ==
- Henri Christophe: A Chronicle in Seven Scenes, Advocate Co., 1949; reprint, G. Collier, Justus Liebig University, 1993
