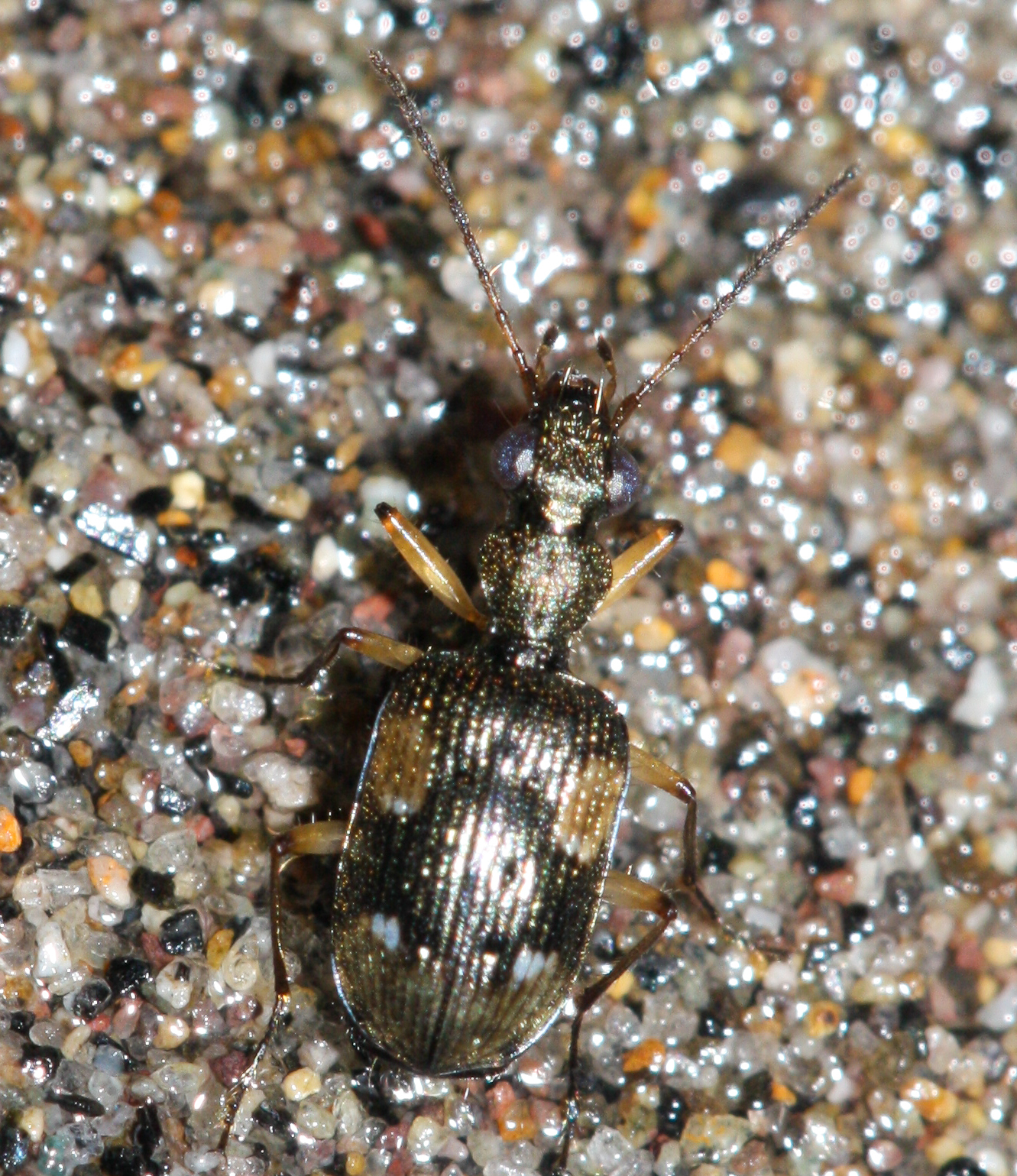
- Lachnophorini, Ecuador

Scientific classification
- Kingdom: Animalia
- Phylum: Arthropoda
- Class: Insecta
- Order: Coleoptera
- Suborder: Adephaga
- Family: Carabidae
- Subfamily: Lebiinae
- Tribe: Lachnophorini; LeConte, 1853

Subtribes
- Calophaenina Jeannel, 1948; Lachnophorina LeConte, 1853

= Lachnophorini =

Tribe of beetles

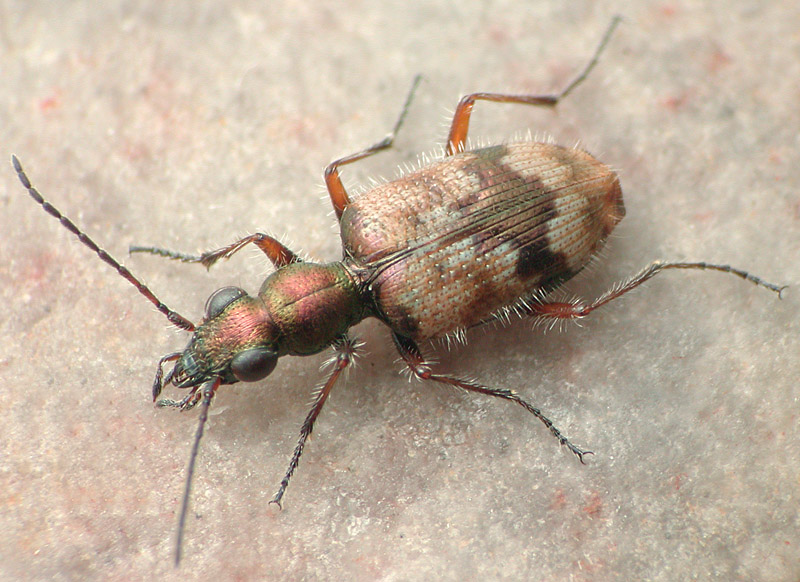
Lachnophorus elegantulus

Lachnophorini is a tribe of ground beetles in the family Carabidae. There are about 18 genera and more than 190 described species in Lachnophorini.

== Genera ==
These 18 genera belong to the tribe Lachnophorini:

- Amphithasus Bates, 1871
- Anchonoderus Reiche, 1843
- Aporesthus Bates, 1871
- Asklepia Liebke, 1938
- Balligratus Moret & Ortuño, 2017
- Calophaena Klug, 1821
- Calophaenoidea Liebke, 1930
- Calybe Laporte, 1834
- Ega Laporte, 1834
- Eucaerus LeConte, 1853
- Euphorticus G.Horn, 1881
- Grundmannius Basilewsky, 1965
- Guatemalteca Erwin, 2004
- Lachnaces Bates, 1872
- Lachnophorus Dejean, 1831
- Peruphorticus Erwin & Zamorano, 2014
- Pseudophorticus Erwin, 2004
- Selina Motschulsky, 1858
