= Calybe (disambiguation) =

Kalybe or Calybe may refer to:

- Calybe, a nymph in Greek mythology
- Calybe (beetle), a genus of beetle
- Kalybe (temple), a type of temple found in Roman Syria
- Cabyle (Thrace), town of ancient Thrace, also called Kalybe
