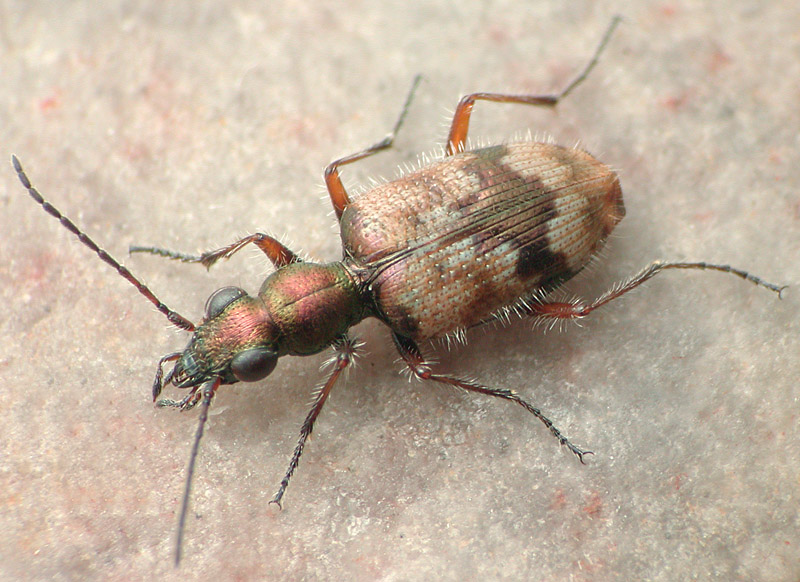

Scientific classification
- Domain: Eukaryota
- Kingdom: Animalia
- Phylum: Arthropoda
- Class: Insecta
- Order: Coleoptera
- Suborder: Adephaga
- Family: Carabidae
- Genus: Lachnophorus
- Species: L. elegantulus

Binomial name
- Lachnophorus elegantulus Mannerheim, 1843

= Lachnophorus elegantulus =

Species of beetle

Lachnophorus elegantulus is a species of ground beetle in the family Carabidae. It is found in North America.
