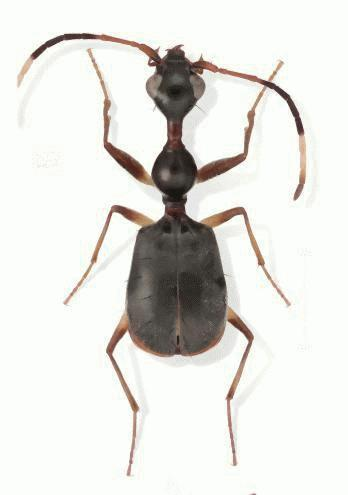
- Selina westermanni, Sri Lanka

Scientific classification
- Kingdom: Animalia
- Phylum: Arthropoda
- Class: Insecta
- Order: Coleoptera
- Suborder: Adephaga
- Family: Carabidae
- Tribe: Lachnophorini
- Subtribe: Lachnophorina
- Genus: Selina; Motschulsky, 1858
- Species: S. westermanni

Binomial name
- Selina westermanni Motschulsky, 1858

Synonyms
- Ega Péringuey, 1896; Pselaphanax Walker, 1859; Sphinctodera Fairmaire, 1901; Steleodera Schaum, 1863

= Selina westermanni =

Genus of beetles

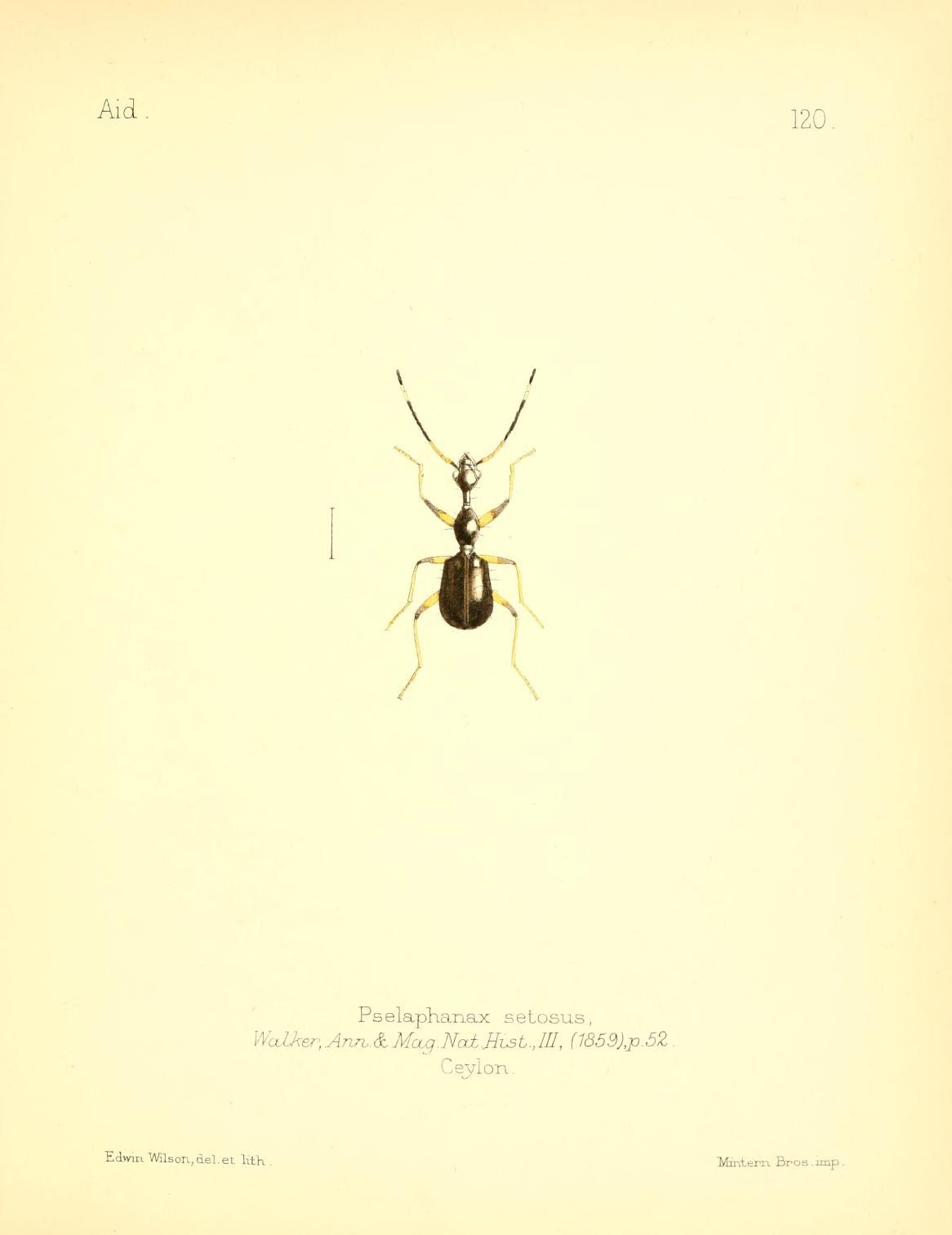
Pl. 20 Aid to the identification of insects.

Selina is a genus of ground beetles in the family Carabidae. This genus has a single species, Selina westermanni. It has been found in the southern and southeastern Asia, Africa, and the Neotropics.
