= Ega aequatoria =

Scientific classification
- Domain: Eukaryota
- Kingdom: Animalia
- Phylum: Arthropoda
- Class: Insecta
- Order: Coleoptera
- Suborder: Adephaga
- Family: Carabidae
- Genus: Ega
- Species: E. aequatoria

Binomial name
- Ega aequatoria Chaudoir, 1850

Synonyms
- Calybe aequatoria (Chaudoir, 1850)

Species of beetle

Ega aequatoria is a species of ground beetle in the family Carabidae. It is found in Colombia.
