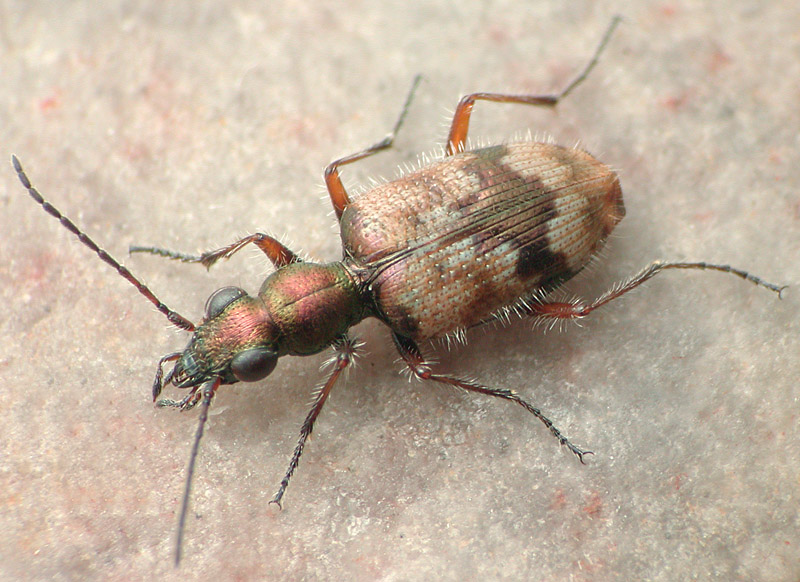
- Lachnophorus elegantulus (female)

Scientific classification
- Kingdom: Animalia
- Phylum: Arthropoda
- Class: Insecta
- Order: Coleoptera
- Suborder: Adephaga
- Family: Carabidae
- Subfamily: Lebiinae
- Tribe: Lachnophorini
- Genus: Lachnophorus; Dejean, 1831

= Lachnophorus =

Genus of beetles

Lachnophorus is a genus in the beetle family Carabidae. There are more than 20 described species in Lachnophorus.

== Species ==
These 27 species belong to the genus Lachnophorus:

- Lachnophorus aeneicollis Bates, 1871 (Brazil)
- Lachnophorus angusticollis Putzeys, 1878 (Colombia)
- Lachnophorus axillaris Motschulsky, 1864 (Panama)
- Lachnophorus azureus Liebke, 1936 (Brazil)
- Lachnophorus corrosus Bates, 1883 (Panama)
- Lachnophorus cuprellus Bates, 1891 (Mexico)
- Lachnophorus elegantulus Mannerheim, 1843 (North and Central America)
- Lachnophorus femoralis Motschulsky, 1864 (Panama)
- Lachnophorus gibbosus Liebke, 1936 (Peru)
- Lachnophorus impressus Brullé, 1837 (Brazil)
- Lachnophorus integer Liebke, 1936 (Peru)
- Lachnophorus laetus Bates, 1871 (Brazil)
- Lachnophorus leucopterus Chevrolat, 1863 (the Lesser Antilles and Cuba)
- Lachnophorus longulus Bates, 1878 (Nicaragua)
- Lachnophorus maculatus Chaudoir, 1850 (Colombia)
- Lachnophorus marginatus Liebke, 1936 (Venezuela)
- Lachnophorus montoroi Tremoleras, 1931 (the Lesser Antilles)
- Lachnophorus nevermanni Liebke, 1939 (Costa Rica)
- Lachnophorus ornatus Bates, 1871 (Brazil)
- Lachnophorus pallidipennis Putzeys, 1845 (Venezuela)
- Lachnophorus pictipennis Bates, 1871 (Central America)
- Lachnophorus quadrinotatus Bates, 1871 (Brazil)
- Lachnophorus quadrinus Bates, 1871 (Brazil)
- Lachnophorus sabanillae Liebke, 1936 (Colombia and Ecuador)
- Lachnophorus signatipennis Chaudoir, 1850 (Colombia)
- Lachnophorus steinbachi Liebke, 1936 (Bolivia)
- Lachnophorus tessellatus (Motschulsky, 1855) (Panama)
