= Euphorticus pubescens =

Scientific classification
- Domain: Eukaryota
- Kingdom: Animalia
- Phylum: Arthropoda
- Class: Insecta
- Order: Coleoptera
- Suborder: Adephaga
- Family: Carabidae
- Genus: Euphorticus
- Species: E. pubescens

Binomial name
- Euphorticus pubescens Dejean, 1831

Species of beetle

Euphorticus pubescens is a species of beetle in the family Carabidae. It is found in Brazil, Mexico, and North Carolina, United States.
