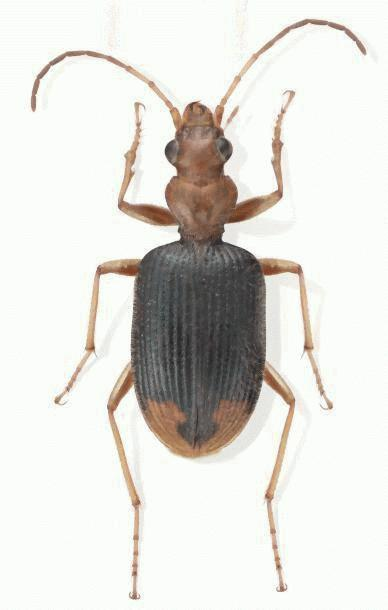
- Anchonoderus apicalis

Scientific classification
- Domain: Eukaryota
- Kingdom: Animalia
- Phylum: Arthropoda
- Class: Insecta
- Order: Coleoptera
- Suborder: Adephaga
- Family: Carabidae
- Subfamily: Lebiinae
- Tribe: Lachnophorini
- Genus: Anchonoderus; Reiche, 1843

= Anchonoderus =

Genus of beetles

Anchonoderus is a genus in the beetle family Carabidae. There are more than 20 described species in Anchonoderus.

== Species ==
These 25 species belong to the genus Anchonoderus:

- Anchonoderus apicalis Reiche, 1843 (Colombia)
- Anchonoderus binotatus Reiche, 1843 (Colombia, Mexico, Central America)
- Anchonoderus concinnus Reiche, 1843 (Ecuador)
- Anchonoderus cupripennis Liebke, 1939 (Brazil)
- Anchonoderus cyanescens (Putzeys, 1878) (Colombia)
- Anchonoderus darlingtoni Liebherr, 1988 (Hispaniola)
- Anchonoderus erosus Putzeys, 1878 (Colombia)
- Anchonoderus eximius (Audouin & Brullé, 1836) (Bolivia)
- Anchonoderus femoratus Putzeys, 1878 (Colombia)
- Anchonoderus fulvipennis Bates, 1891 (Costa Rica, Mexico)
- Anchonoderus horni Csiki, 1931 (Mexico)
- Anchonoderus infirmus Bates, 1884 (Panama)
- Anchonoderus jamaicensis Liebherr, 1988 (Lesser Antilles)
- Anchonoderus montanus Liebke, 1951 (Peru)
- Anchonoderus myops Reiche, 1843 (Colombia and Panama)
- Anchonoderus quadrinotatus G.Horn, 1878 (United States)
- Anchonoderus reichei Putzeys, 1878 (Colombia)
- Anchonoderus roedingeri Liebke, 1951 (Peru)
- Anchonoderus scabricollis Bates, 1871 (Brazil)
- Anchonoderus schaefferi Liebke, 1928 (United States)
- Anchonoderus subaeneus Reiche, 1843 (Colombia, Guatemala)
- Anchonoderus subtilis Bates, 1871 (Guatemala, Mexico, Cuba)
- Anchonoderus tucumanus Liebke, 1939 (Argentina)
- Anchonoderus undatus Chaudoir, 1850 (French Guiana)
- Anchonoderus unicolor Chaudoir, 1850 (Colombia)
