= Eucaerus varicornis =

Scientific classification
- Kingdom: Animalia
- Phylum: Arthropoda
- Clade: Pancrustacea
- Class: Insecta
- Order: Coleoptera
- Suborder: Adephaga
- Family: Carabidae
- Genus: Eucaerus
- Species: E. varicornis

Binomial name
- Eucaerus varicornis LeConte, 1853

Species of beetle

Eucaerus varicornis is a species of ground beetle in the family Carabidae. It is found in North America.
