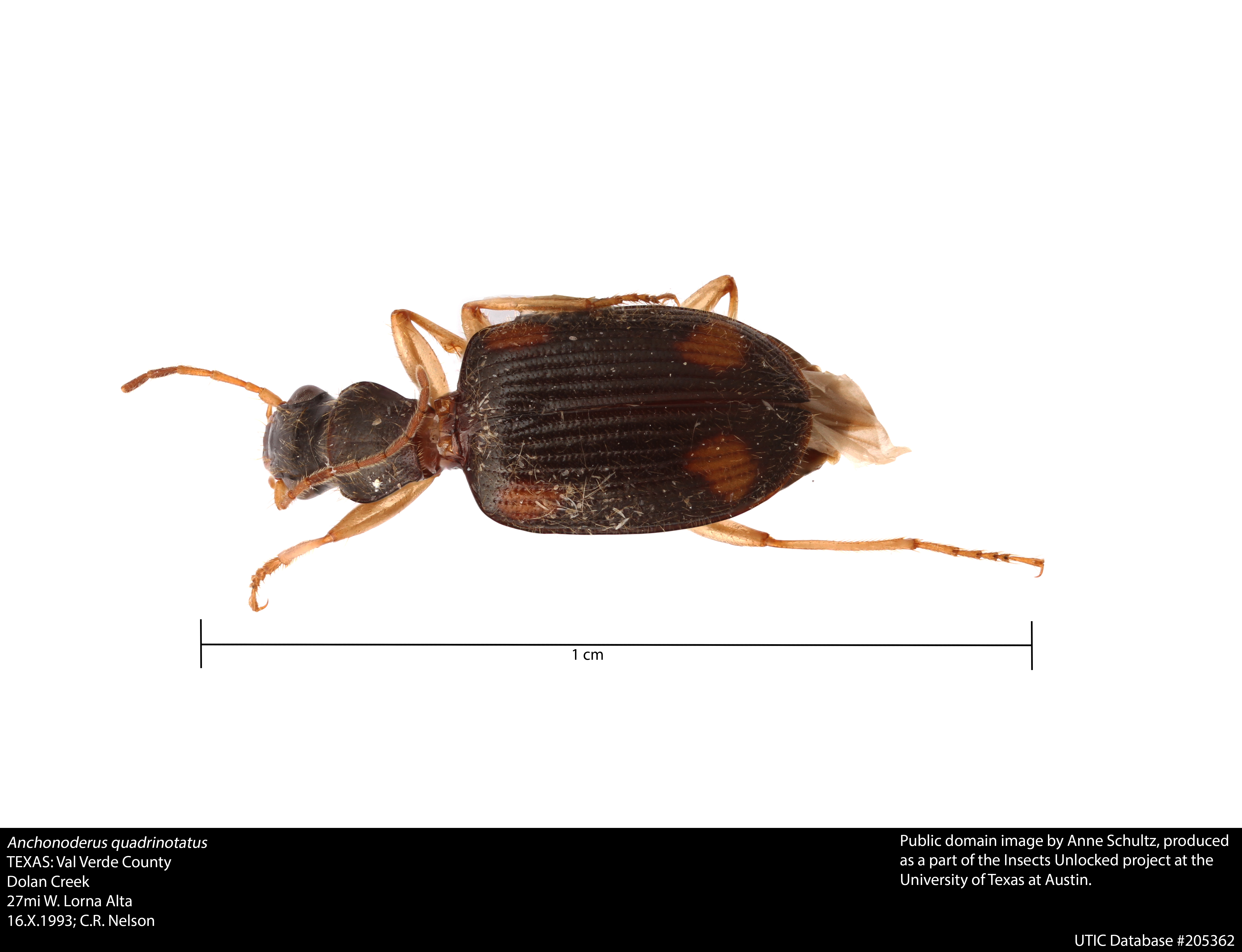

Scientific classification
- Domain: Eukaryota
- Kingdom: Animalia
- Phylum: Arthropoda
- Class: Insecta
- Order: Coleoptera
- Suborder: Adephaga
- Family: Carabidae
- Genus: Anchonoderus
- Species: A. quadrinotatus

Binomial name
- Anchonoderus quadrinotatus G. Horn, 1878

= Anchonoderus quadrinotatus =

Species of beetle

Anchonoderus quadrinotatus is a species of ground beetle in the family Carabidae. It is found in North America.
