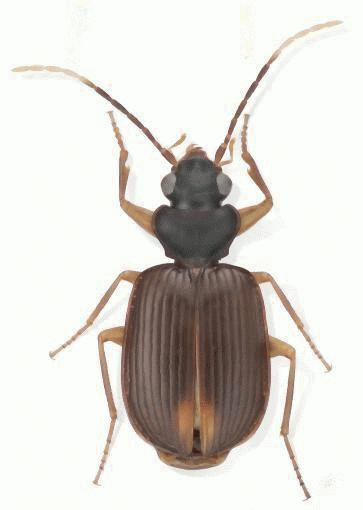
- Eucaerus

Scientific classification
- Domain: Eukaryota
- Kingdom: Animalia
- Phylum: Arthropoda
- Class: Insecta
- Order: Coleoptera
- Suborder: Adephaga
- Family: Carabidae
- Subfamily: Lebiinae
- Tribe: Lachnophorini
- Genus: Eucaerus; LeConte, 1853

= Eucaerus (beetle) =

Genus of beetles

Eucaerus is a genus of ground beetles in the family Carabidae. There are about seven described species in Eucaerus, found in North, Central, and South America.

== Species ==
These seven species belong to the genus Eucaerus:

- Eucaerus haitianus Darlington, 1936 (Hispaniola)
- Eucaerus insularis Darlington, 1934 (Cuba)
- Eucaerus sericeus Bates, 1871 (Brazil)
- Eucaerus striatus Bates, 1871 (Brazil)
- Eucaerus sublimbatus Motschulsky, 1862 (Guyana and French Guiana)
- Eucaerus sulcatus Bates, 1871 (Brazil)
- Eucaerus varicornis LeConte, 1853 (United States)
