= Pseudophorticus =

Scientific classification
- Domain: Eukaryota
- Kingdom: Animalia
- Phylum: Arthropoda
- Class: Insecta
- Order: Coleoptera
- Suborder: Adephaga
- Family: Carabidae
- Subfamily: Lebiinae
- Tribe: Lachnophorini
- Subtribe: Lachnophorina
- Genus: Pseudophorticus; Erwin, 2004

Genus of beetles

Pseudophorticus is a genus in the beetle family Carabidae. There are about 14 described species in Pseudophorticus.

== Species ==
These 14 species belong to the genus Pseudophorticus:

- Pseudophorticus bipunctatus (Gory, 1833) (French Guiana)
- Pseudophorticus constricticollis Fedorenko, 2017 (Vietnam)
- Pseudophorticus foveatus (Bates, 1871) (Brazil)
- Pseudophorticus guttulatus (Bates, 1883) (Panama and Guatemala)
- Pseudophorticus lucidus (Bates, 1884) (Panama)
- Pseudophorticus macrospilus (Bates, 1871) (Brazil)
- Pseudophorticus notatus (Chaudoir, 1850) (Colombia, Panama, Costa Rica, Guatemala)
- Pseudophorticus ochropus (Bates, 1871) (Brazil)
- Pseudophorticus puncticollis Erwin, 2004 (Costa Rica)
- Pseudophorticus semirufus (Bates, 1878) (Panama and Nicaragua)
- Pseudophorticus subauratus (Bates, 1883) (Guatemala)
- Pseudophorticus submaculatus (Bates, 1871) (Brazil)
- Pseudophorticus tetragonoderoides Fedorenko, 2017 (Vietnam)
- Pseudophorticus tibialis (Bates, 1871) (Brazil)
