= Grundmannius =

Scientific classification
- Kingdom: Animalia
- Phylum: Arthropoda
- Class: Insecta
- Order: Coleoptera
- Suborder: Adephaga
- Family: Carabidae
- Tribe: Lachnophorini
- Subtribe: Lachnophorina
- Genus: Grundmannius; Basilewsky, 1965
- Species: G. dispar

Binomial name
- Grundmannius dispar (Péringuey, 1896)

Genus of beetles

Grundmannius is a genus of carabids in the beetle family Carabidae. This genus has a single species, Grundmannius dispar. It is found in Zimbabwe and South Africa.
