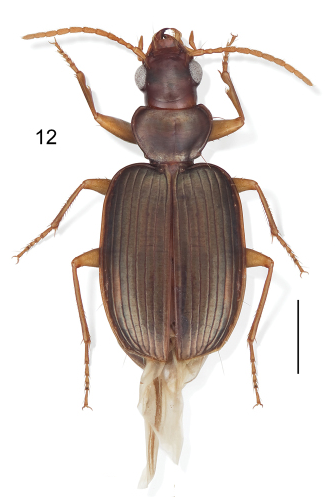
- Digital photo-illustration of a G. virgen specimen from near La Virgen, Costa Rica

Scientific classification
- Domain: Eukaryota
- Kingdom: Animalia
- Phylum: Arthropoda
- Class: Insecta
- Order: Coleoptera
- Suborder: Adephaga
- Family: Carabidae
- Genus: Guatemalteca; Erwin, 2004

Type species
- Guatemalteca virgen Erwin, 2004

= Guatemalteca =

Genus of beetles

Guatemalteca is a genus of beetle in the family Carabidae. As of 2017, its only described species is its type species, Guatemalteca virgen. When Terry Erwin named the genus in 2004, he placed it in the tribe Lachnophorini; in 2014 he and Laura S. Zamorano placed it in the subtribe Eucaerina.

In 2014, Erwin and Zamorano wrote that there were two additional undescribed species in this genus represented in the National Museum of Natural History collection.

The genus's distribution includes cloud forests from Mexico to Peru, including Costa Rica, Guatemala, French Guiana, Mexico, and Peru.
