= Anchonoderus schaefferi =

Scientific classification
- Domain: Eukaryota
- Kingdom: Animalia
- Phylum: Arthropoda
- Class: Insecta
- Order: Coleoptera
- Suborder: Adephaga
- Family: Carabidae
- Genus: Anchonoderus
- Species: A. schaefferi

Binomial name
- Anchonoderus schaefferi Liebke, 1928

Species of beetle

Anchonoderus schaefferi is a species of ground beetle in the family Carabidae. It is found in North America.
