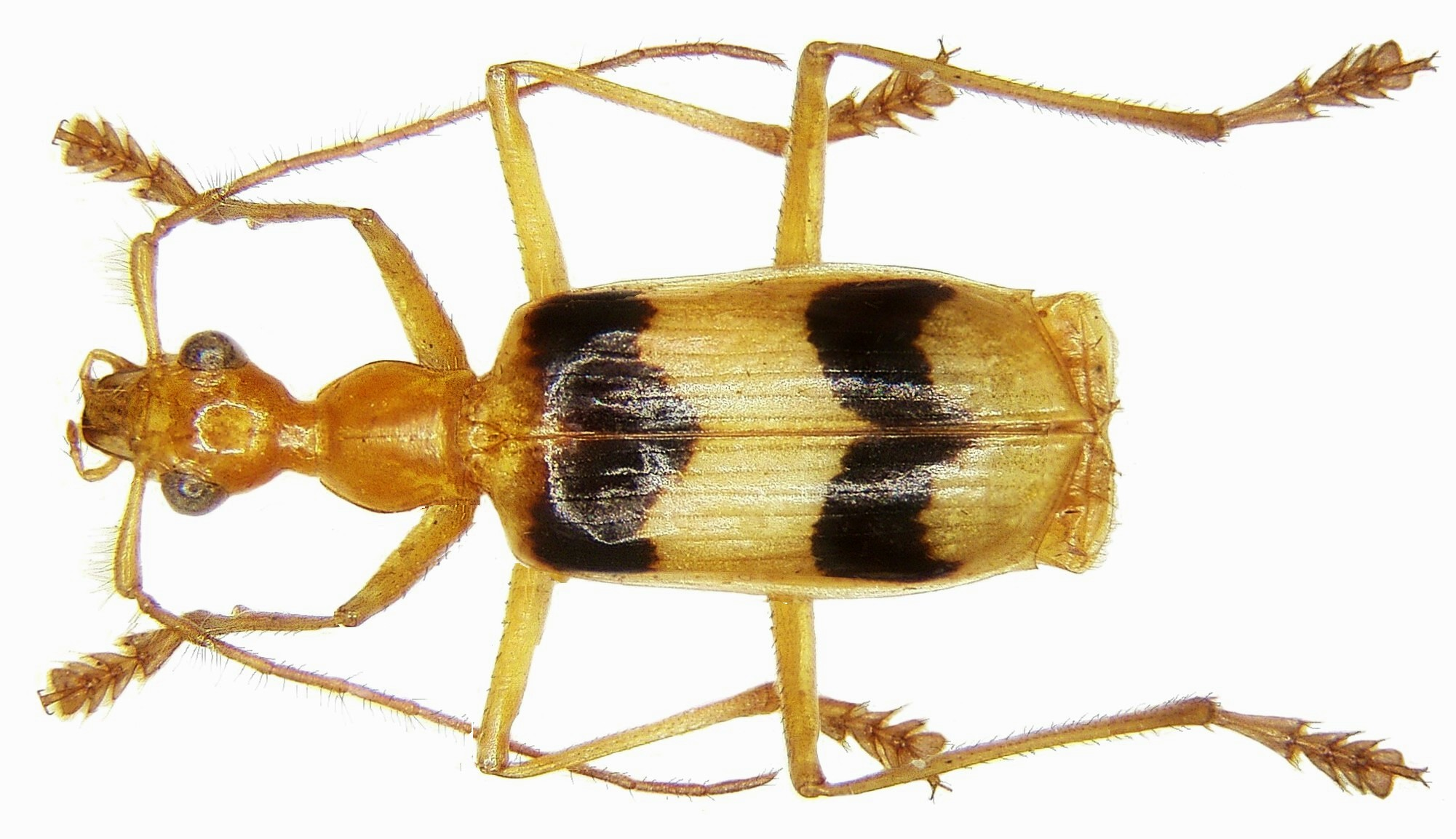
- Calophaena bicincta

Scientific classification
- Domain: Eukaryota
- Kingdom: Animalia
- Phylum: Arthropoda
- Class: Insecta
- Order: Coleoptera
- Suborder: Adephaga
- Family: Carabidae
- Subfamily: Lebiinae
- Tribe: Lachnophorini
- Subtribe: Calophaenina
- Genus: Calophaena; Klug, 1821

= Calophaena =

Genus of beetles

Calophaena is a genus of beetles in the family Carabidae, containing the following species:

- Calophaena aculeata Chaudoir, 1861
- Calophaena acuminata (Olivier, 1790)
- Calophaena alboguttata Waterhouse, 1880
- Calophaena angusticollis Chaudoir, 1861
- Calophaena apicalis Chaudoir, 1861
- Calophaena apiceguttata Chaudoir, 1861
- Calophaena arcuata (Guerin-Meneville, 1844)
- Calophaena arrowi Liebke, 1930
- Calophaena azurea Liebke, 1938
- Calophaena batesii Chaudoir, 1861
- Calophaena bicincta (Dejean & Boisduval, 1829)
- Calophaena bifasciata (Olivier, 1790)
- Calophaena bonvouloirii Chaudoir, 1872
- Calophaena buckleyi Liebke, 1930
- Calophaena caeruleofasciata Liebke, 1930
- Calophaena cincta (Gray, 1832)
- Calophaena cordicollis Chaudoir, 1861
- Calophaena costaricensis Liebke, 1930
- Calophaena cruciata Bates, 1878
- Calophaena dentatofasciata Chaudoir, 1861
- Calophaena distincta Chaudoir, 1861
- Calophaena dupuisi Liebke, 1930
- Calophaena ephippigera Liebke, 1930
- Calophaena gerstaeckeri Chaudoir, 1861
- Calophaena gounellei Liebke, 1935
- Calophaena grandispina Liebke, 1930
- Calophaena hieroglyphica Liebke, 1930
- Calophaena interrupta Liebke, 1938
- Calophaena laevigata Bates, 1878
- Calophaena lafertei Guerin-Meneville, 1844
- Calophaena latecincta Chaudoir, 1861
- Calophaena latefasciata Motschulsky, 1864
- Calophaena ligata
- Calophaena maculata (Dejean, 1825)
- Calophaena mimosa Reichardt, 1971
- Calophaena moseri Liebke, 1930
- Calophaena nevermanni Liebke, 1930
- Calophaena nigripennis Chaudoir, 1852
- Calophaena peruana Mateu, 1972
- Calophaena pleurostigma Chaudoir, 1861
- Calophaena quadrimaculata (Gory, 1830)
- Calophaena rutilicollis Liebke, 1930
- Calophaena schroederi Liebke, 1930
- Calophaena sexmaculata Liebke, 1930
- Calophaena unifasciata Chaudoir, 1861
- Calophaena virgata Liebke, 1930
- Calophaena viridipennis Bates, 1871
- Calophaena vitticollis Bates, 1883
- Calophaena xanthacra Chaudoir, 1861
