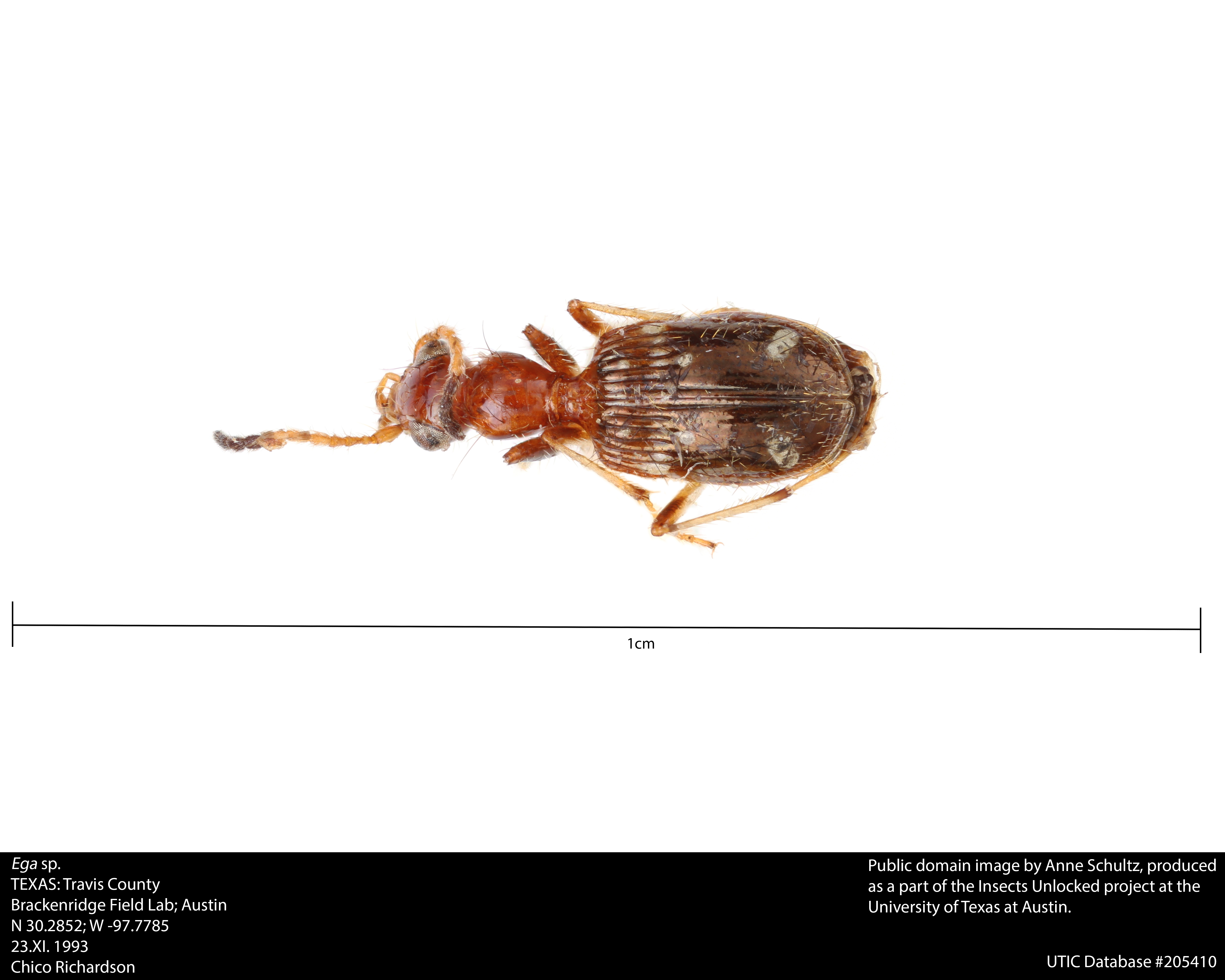

Scientific classification
- Domain: Eukaryota
- Kingdom: Animalia
- Phylum: Arthropoda
- Class: Insecta
- Order: Coleoptera
- Suborder: Adephaga
- Family: Carabidae
- Genus: Ega; Laporte de Castelnau, 1835

= Ega (beetle) =

Genus of beetles

Ega is a genus of ground beetles in the family Carabidae. There are about 17 described species in Ega.

== Species ==
These 17 species belong to the genus Ega:

- Ega aequatoria Chaudoir, 1850^{c g}
- Ega amazonica Chaudoir, 1872^{c g}
- Ega anthicoides (Solier, 1836)^{c g}
- Ega argentina (Brèthes, 1916)^{c g}
- Ega biloba Bates, 1871^{c g}
- Ega brasiliensis Motschulsky, 1864^{c g}
- Ega delicatula (Motschulsky, 1864)^{c g}
- Ega formicaria Laporte, 1834^{c g}
- Ega fuscoaenea Motschulsky, 1864^{c g}
- Ega laetula LeConte, 1851^{c g}
- Ega longiceps (Schaum, 1863)^{c g}
- Ega montevidensis (Tremoleras, 1917)^{c g}
- Ega nodicollis Bates, 1871^{c g}
- Ega obliqua Chaudoir, 1872^{c g}
- Ega sallei Chevrolet^{c g b}
- Ega sulcipennis Chaudoir, 1872^{c g}
- Ega tenuicollis (Dejean, 1831)^{c g}

Data sources: i = ITIS, c = Catalogue of Life, g = GBIF, b = Bugguide.net
