= Calophaenoidea =

Calophaenoidea arrowi

Scientific classification
- Kingdom: Animalia
- Phylum: Arthropoda
- Class: Insecta
- Order: Coleoptera
- Suborder: Adephaga
- Family: Carabidae
- Subfamily: Lebiinae
- Genus: Calophaenoidea; Liebke, 1930
- Species: C. arrowi

Binomial name
- Calophaenoidea arrowi Liebke, 1930

Genus of beetles

Calophaenoidea arrowi is a species of beetle in the family Carabidae, the only species in the genus Calophaenoidea.
