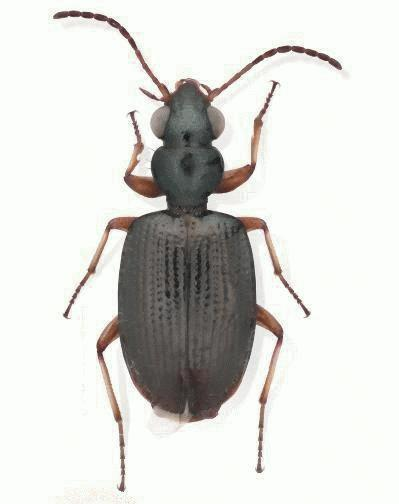

Scientific classification
- Kingdom: Animalia
- Phylum: Arthropoda
- Class: Insecta
- Order: Coleoptera
- Suborder: Adephaga
- Family: Carabidae
- Subfamily: Lebiinae
- Genus: Euphorticus; G. Horn, 1881

= Euphorticus =

Genus of beetles

Euphorticus is a genus in the beetle family Carabidae. There are about five described species in Euphorticus.

== Species ==
These five species belong to the genus Euphorticus:

- Euphorticus laevicollis (Reiche, 1843) (Colombia and French Guiana)
- Euphorticus leucoscelis (Bates, 1878) (Panama and Nicaragua)
- Euphorticus occidentalis G.Horn, 1891 (United States)
- Euphorticus pilosus (Dejean, 1831) (Brazil)
- Euphorticus pubescens (Dejean, 1831) (United States, Guatemala, Mexico, and Cuba)
