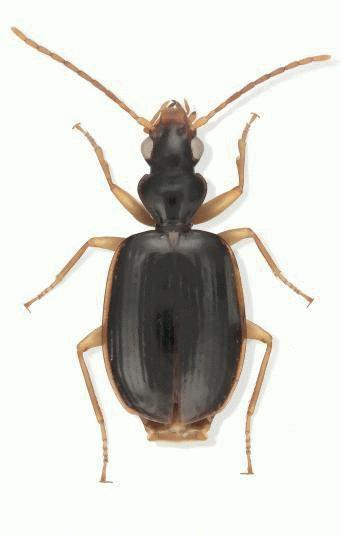

Scientific classification
- Kingdom: Animalia
- Phylum: Arthropoda
- Class: Insecta
- Order: Coleoptera
- Suborder: Adephaga
- Family: Carabidae
- Subfamily: Lebiinae
- Genus: Aporesthus; Bates, 1871

= Aporesthus =

Genus of beetles

Aporesthus is a genus of beetles in the family Carabidae, containing the following species:

- Aporesthus anomalus (Bates, 1871)
- Aporesthus suturalis (Liebke, 1951)
- Aporesthus titschacki (Liebke, 1951)
