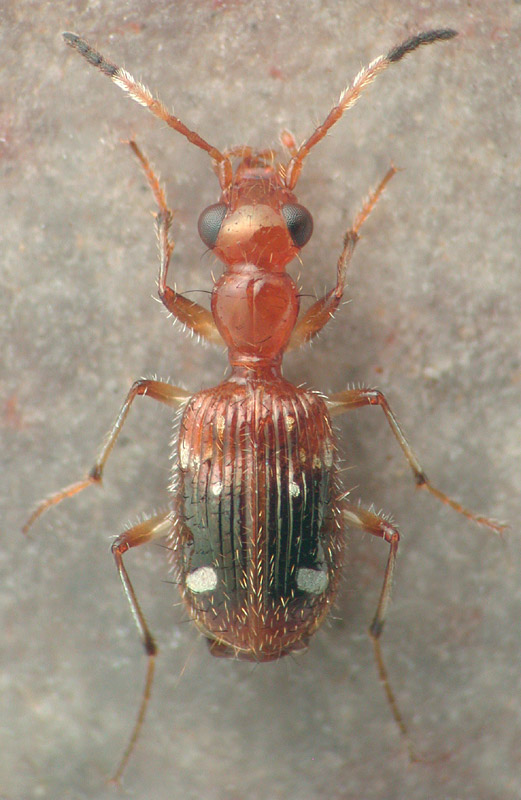
- Calybe laetula

Scientific classification
- Domain: Eukaryota
- Kingdom: Animalia
- Phylum: Arthropoda
- Class: Insecta
- Order: Coleoptera
- Suborder: Adephaga
- Family: Carabidae
- Subfamily: Lebiinae
- Tribe: Lachnophorini
- Subtribe: Lachnophorina
- Genus: Calybe; Laporte, 1834

= Calybe (beetle) =

Genus of beetles

Calybe is a genus of beetles in the family Carabidae, containing the following species:

== Species ==
These eight species belong to the genus Calybe:

- Calybe basalis Bates, 1871 (Brazil)
- Calybe belti Bates, 1878 (Costa Rica and Nicaragua)
- Calybe grata (Motschulsky, 1864) (the Lesser Antilles and Colombia)
- Calybe inaequalis Brullé, 1838 (Argentina and Brazil)
- Calybe leprieuri Laporte, 1834 (French Guiana and Brazil)
- Calybe leucopa Bates, 1871 (Brazil)
- Calybe magna Liebke, 1939 (Brazil)
- Calybe tumidula Bates, 1871 (Brazil)
