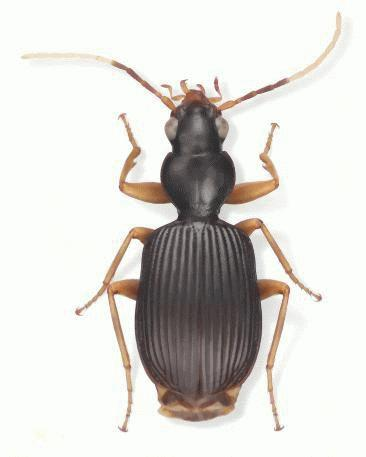

Scientific classification
- Kingdom: Animalia
- Phylum: Arthropoda
- Class: Insecta
- Order: Coleoptera
- Suborder: Adephaga
- Family: Carabidae
- Subfamily: Lebiinae
- Genus: Amphithasus; Bates, 1871
- Species: A. truncatus

Binomial name
- Amphithasus truncatus Bates, 1871

= Amphithasus =

Amphithasus truncatus

Genus of beetles

Amphithasus truncatus is a species of beetle in the family Carabidae, the only species in the genus Amphithasus.
