= List of Krio Fernandino people =

This is a list of notable Krio Fernandino people.

== A ==
- Allen
  - Henry Enrique Allen

== B ==
- Barber
  - Kenneth Barber
- Barleycorn
  - Edward Barleycorn
  - Edward Emilio Barleycorn – farmer
  - Edward Thaddeus Barleycorn Barber – doctor, minister and barber
  - Gertrude Johnson Barleycorn
  - Jeremiah (Jeremias) Barleycorn – an appointed mayor of former Santa Isabel
  - Napoleon Barleycorn
  - William Barleycorn

== C ==
- Coker
- Collins

== D ==
- Davis
  - David Davis
- Dougan
  - Joseph Dougan, patriarch of the Dougan family and their family home La Casa Teodolita (1902) in Malabo (formerly known as Santa Isabel) in Equatorial Guinea. He was the husband of Doña Mariana Kinson Bishop, also of Santa Isabel. La Casa Teodolita is today considered a national patrimony today, due to its architectural design and innovative construction techniques. Joseph Dougan was one of the country's agronomists. He was an agricultural entrepreneur along with other notable Creole families at the time (such as the Jones, Vivour etc.) They contributed to the economic development of the country. He and other similar families owned vast amounts of land devoted to the cultivation of cocoa and coffee.
  - Teófilo Jorge Dougan Kinson, elder son of Joseph Dougan and Mariana Kinson-Bishop, and related to the royal Aqua House (of the present Republic of Cameroon). He studied in Spain at an early age before studying law at the University of Barcelona, Spain. He was the first native from Equatorial Guinea (then Spanish Guinea) to become a lawyer. He died in Barcelona in the early 1960s.
  - Joseph Walterio Dougan Kinson, son of Joseph Dougan and Mariana Kinson-Bishop. He studied at Fourah Bay College in Freetown, Sierra Leone and later agriculture in Spain. He became a notable politician and Diplomat of Equatorial Guinea, appointed as ambassador of The Republic of Equatorial Guinea to many African nations and The Organisation of African Unity. He held the post of Minister of Justice before going into exile. He died in exile in Nigeria in 1984.
  - Jose Domingo Dougan Beaca, son of Joseph Walterio Dougan Kinson. He studied in Italy and Switzerland, earning a degree in International law. He became a United Nations Diplomat Chief, holding the post of Coordinator Head of the Latin America and Caribbean Unit. Later he served as head the Anti-Discrimination Unit of the Human Rights High Commissioners office (Geneva, Switzerland) of the United Nations. He is vice-president of the World Organisation Against Torture, based in Switzerland.
  - Angel Serafin Seriche Dougan Malabo, son of Teofilo Dougan Kinson. He is a career diplomat and member of government of Equatorial Guinea. He has served in a variety of posts before being appointed as ambassador to Nigeria and later to Cameroon. He served as Prime Minister of Equatorial Guinea and was later appointed as the President/Speaker of the House of Representatives. Since July 2013, he was made Senator for Life (Senador Vitalicio) in Equatorial Guinea.
  - Jose Dougan Chubum, a son of Joseph Okori Dougan Kinson. He is an aviation pilot who studied law in Cuba. He became director of human resources for Amarak, Inc. in Equatorial Guinea. He later established an oil fuel business. In 2013 he was appointed as ambassador to Portugal, and to the Democratic Republic of Timor-Leste, with residence in Lisbon.
  - Eleanor Sono Dougan Ngongolo, a daughter of Joseph Okori Dougan Kinson. She studied business administration, and held an honours degree from The University of London. She was Chief Financial Accountant and a financial managers of London Transport.
  - Ana María Dougan Thomson, daughter of Teófilo Jorge Dougan Kinson, followed the footsteps of her father by studying law at the University of Barcelona, Spain, and becoming a lawyer. Her legal career included serving as the Dean of Bar Association of Equatorial Guinea (c. 1990 – 1994). She married D. Román Boricó Toichoa, who would become an Industry Minister in the Autonomous Government (1964–1968), as well as the Minister of Labor in the first government that emerged after the Independence of Equatorial Guinea in 1968.

== F ==
- Fergusson
  - William Fergusson Nicol

== J ==
- Johnson
- Jones
- Bobby Jones
  - Maximiliano Jones – farmer and millionaire
  - Miguel Jones – Spanish footballer
  - Wilwardo Jones – Mayor of Santa Isabel in the 1960s.
  - Alfredo Jones – Agronomist and Spanish consul in Calabar in the 1960s.

== K ==
- Kinson
  - Samuel Kinson
- Knox
  - J. W. Knox

== N ==
- Niger
  - Daniel Niger

== T ==
- Thompson
  - Theophilus (Theopilo) Thompson

== V ==
- Vivour
  - Amelia Barleycorn Vivour
  - William Vivour

== W ==
- Willis
  - Catherine (Catalina) Willis
