= Amelia Barleycorn =

- Born: c. 1860; Malabo
- Died: January 3, 1920 (aged 59–60); Barcelona
- Spouse(s): William Vivour
- Parent(s): Napoleon Barleycorn
- Relatives: William Barleycorn

Amelia Barleycorn de Vivour (c. 1860 – January 3, 1920) was a wealthy and socially prominent member of the Krio Fernandino minority in the colony of Spanish Guinea. In 1911, she sued the Spanish government to protect the rights of herself and her fellow Krio Fernandino.

Barleycorn was born around 1860 in Santa Isabel (present-day Malabo) on the island of Fernando Pó (present-day Bioko). She was the daughter of Napoleon Barleycorn, an Igbo Methodist minister who settled on the island. In 1882, she married William Allen Vivour, a formerly enslaved Yoruba who became a wealthy planter and trader of palm oil and cocoa on Fernando Pó. After his death in 1890, she became the wealthiest person in Spanish Guinea and the largest plantation owner on the island, with her properties covering 400 hectares. She had homes in Santa Isabel and San Carlos (present-day Luba) and built a large mansion overlooking the bay in San Carlos in 1905. Barleycorn regularly travelled to Europe, renting residences in Islington, London and the exclusive neighborhood of Sarrià-Sant Gervasi in Barcelona.

In 1911, she complained to the Spanish government regarding the Civil Code requirement that Protestant marriages in the territories of Catholic Spain be registered with civil authorities or be invalidated. If applied retroactively, this requirement risked the validity of her marriage and fortune and threatened many other largely Protestant Krio Fernandino. The matter resulted in these marriages being legitimized and paved the way for a process for all Krio Fernandino to obtain Spanish citizenship.
