= Barleycorn (surname) =

Barleycorn is an English surname. Notable people with the surname include:

- Edward Barleycorn (1891–1978), Equatoguinean politician
- Napoleon Barleycorn, Primitive Methodist missionary
- William Barleycorn (1848–1925), Primitive Methodist missionary
