= Reduction of Lagos =

1851 British naval bombardment of present-day Lagos, Nigeria

- Part of the Suppression of the Slave Trade
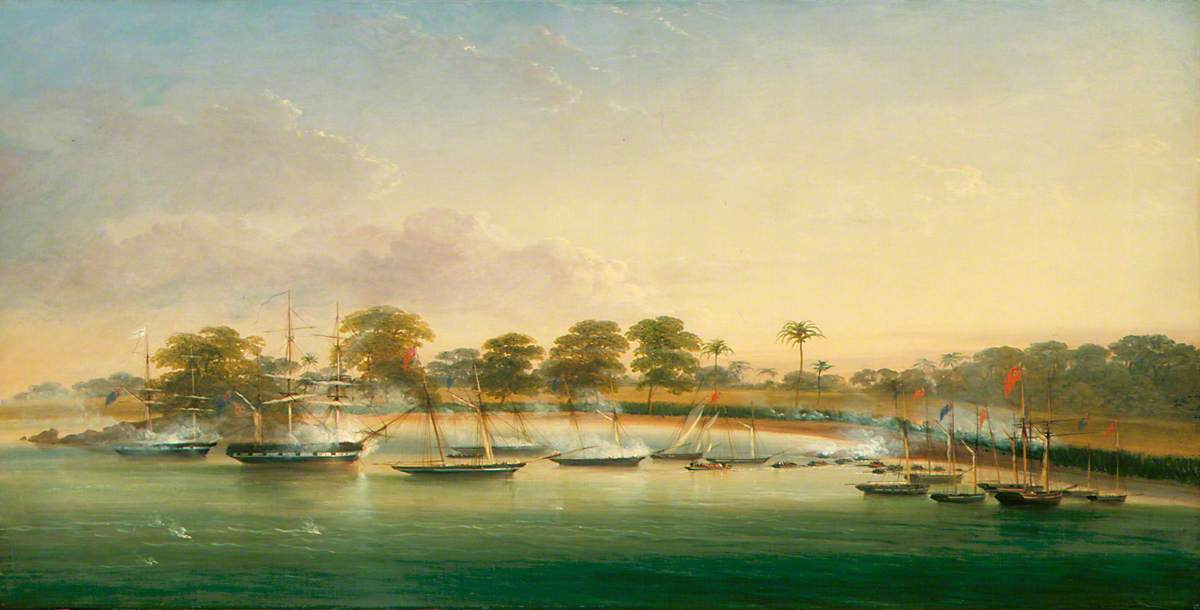
- "British Men o' War Attacked by the King of Lagos" (James George Philp, 1851)
Date	1851–1852
Location	Lagos, present-day Nigeria
Result	British victory: Atlantic slave trade abolished in Lagos with the Treaty Between Great Britain and Lagos; Akitoye reinsistated as Oba of Lagos

Belligerents
(United Kingdom of Great Britain and Ireland) United Kingdom	Lagos

Commanders and leaders
(United Kingdom of Great Britain and Ireland) John Beecroft; (United Kingdom of Great Britain and Ireland) Commander Wilmot; (United Kingdom of Great Britain and Ireland) Commander Forbes; (United Kingdom of Great Britain and Ireland) Commander Gardner	Kosoko; Balogun Ajeniya; Oshodi Tapa

Casualties and losses
15 men died and 75 were wounded	Unknown but high

The Reduction of Lagos or Bombardment of Lagos was a British naval operation in late 1851. The Royal Navy bombarded Lagos (in present-day Nigeria) in order to suppress the Atlantic slave trade, and to depose the King (Oba) of Lagos, Kosoko, for refusing to end the slave trade.

Many intersecting interests provided the British Government with military action pretext against Kosoko. These interests included the British government's desire to replace the slave trade with alternative legitimate trade, British missionary interest in spreading Christianity, and fears that some Lagos residents, known as the Saro, who were liberated from Atlantic slave trade, would be persecuted and re-enslaved.

The British eventually deposed Kosoko. They replaced him with Akitoye, who had previously lost his throne to Kosoko and had asked the British to help him return to power. In return, Akitoye promised to end the slave trade. In 1852, Akitoye and John Beecroft signed the Treaty Between Great Britain and Lagos.

The treaty required the native ruling elite of Lagos to abolish the Atlantic slave trade, liberate enslaved Africans, expel European slave traders residing in Lagos, and to allow British subjects to have trade access to Lagos. However, illegal slave-trading activities persisted until the British Empire annexed Lagos as a British protectorate in August 1861, which would later be declared a British colony in 1862, and then incorporated into the Southern Nigeria Protectorate in 1906.

== Background ==
=== Royal Navy's early 19th century anti-slavery measures ===
In Britain's early 19th century fight against the Atlantic slave trade, its West Africa Squadron or Preventative Squadron as it was also known, continued to pursue Portuguese, American, French, and Cuban slave ships and to impose anti-slavery treaties with West African coastal chiefs with so much doggedness that they created a strong presence along the West African coast from Sierra Leone all the way to the Niger Delta (today's Nigeria) and as far south as Congo.

In 1849, Britain appointed John Beecroft Consul of the Bights of Benin and Biafra, a position he held (along with his governorship of Fernando Po) until his death in 1854. Lagos was a key slave trading port, in the western part of this area. John Duncan was appointed Vice Consul and was located at Whydah.

=== Rival Obas, Akitoye vs. Kosoko ===
Oba Kosoko ousted Oba Akitoye from the throne of Lagos in 1845 and forced him into exile. Akitoye recognized the need for British military alliance (and the requirement to give up the slave trade) as a necessary condition for taking back the throne. In December 1850, Akitoye appealed for British aid reminding the British about a similar plea he had made back in 1846, promising to embrace legitimate trade if assistance were provided to put him back on the throne.

=== Appeals for intervention by British missionaries and Saro people ===
British missionaries sought the outright abolition of the slave trade and its replacement by legitimate commerce, and they wanted to carry out their evangelical work without risk or hindrance. Similarly many of the liberated Saros (many of whom were Christians) by this time present in Lagos and Abeokuta were in a precarious situation, being persecuted and even returned to slavery. They presented arguments for British intervention to Lord Palmerston,

In August 1851, Henry Venn executed a powerful public relations coup by deploying Samuel Ajayi Crowther, (who had been liberated by the British Navy, resettled in Sierra Leone, and was now a missionary himself) to argue the case for British intervention in Lagos before Queen Victoria, Lord Palmerston, and the Lords of the Admiralty. Bishop Crowther argued that if Lagos were placed under Akitoye and allied with Britain, British commercial interests would be guaranteed and the slave trade could be suppressed. The Admiralty and Palmerston commissioned Beecroft to make an assessment.

== Last minute diplomacy ==
On November 20, 1851, a British party consisting of Consul Beecroft, Commander Wilmot, Commander Gardner, and Lieutenant Patey arrived at the Oba Kosoko's palace in an attempt to seek a British/Lagos friendship dependent on Kosoko's renunciation of the slave trade. Kosoko, through Oshodi Tapa, rejected the friendship offer and the British delegation departed the Oba's palace. Beecroft then wrote to the senior officer of the Bights division, Commander Forbes, that it was time for the British Royal Navy to expel Kosoko and install Akitoye, the "rightful heir".

== British naval action ==
There were actually two naval actions; one in November 1851 and the second in December 1851.

=== Battle of November 25, 1851 ===
The first attack on November 25, 1851, was hastily organized and led by Commander Forbes, who underestimated Kosoko's defenses of about 5,000 men armed with muskets. Forbes' attack party consisted of 306 officers, men, marines and sailors aboard HMS Bloodhound along with 21 boats. Although Bloodhound sustained heavy cannon fire from the shore, a landing party went ashore but met stiff resistance. By nightfall, the British had sustained two dead and ten injuries; Commander Forbes ordered a retreat.

=== Battle of December 26, 1851 ===
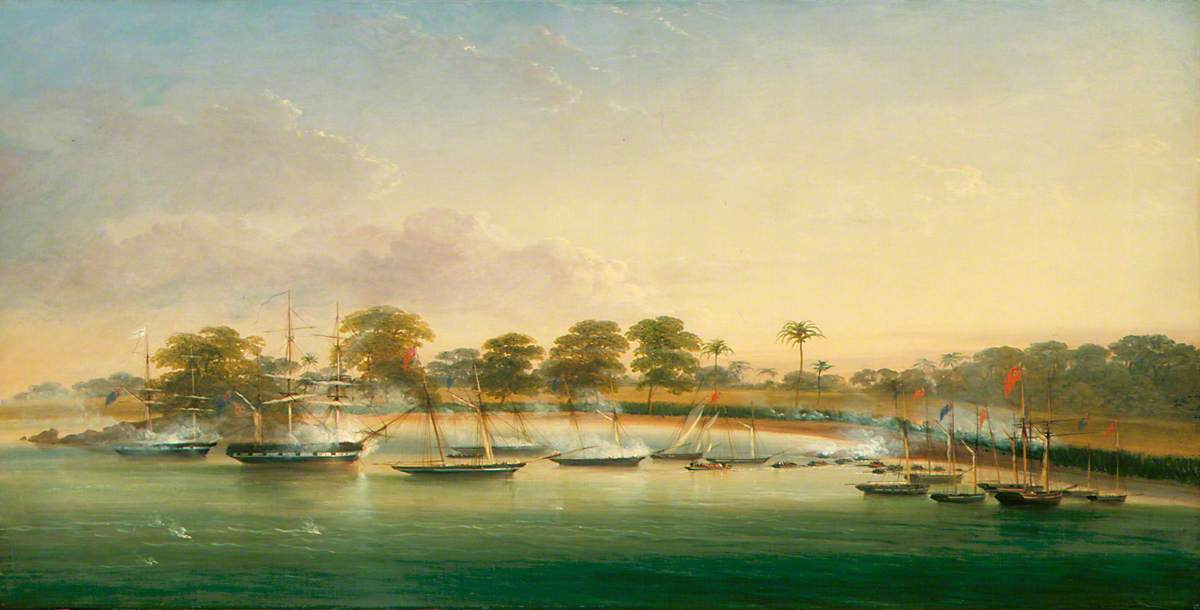
British Men o' War Attacked by the King of Lagos

The battle of December 26, 1851 was termed by Lagosians Ogun Ahoyaya/Ogun Agidingbi (translated, "The Boiling Battle"). Captain Jones led the attack party consisting HMS Bloodhound, HMS Teaser, a flotilla of boats including The Victoria and The Harlequin equipped with overwhelming fire power engaged Kosoko in a battle lasting three days. Kosoko put up a stiff resistance, but the Royal Navy's superior firepower won the day. Kosoko and his leading chiefs fled Lagos for Epe on December 28, 1851. According to Samuel Davies, a Saro and younger brother of JPL Davies who participated on the British side aboard HMS Bloodhound, Kosoko would have inflicted great losses on the Royal Navy if he had deployed his war canoes with their swivel guns. However, he relied solely on static defenses which were overwhelmed. On the British side 15 men died and 75 were wounded. A young James Pinson Labulo Davies was among the wounded.

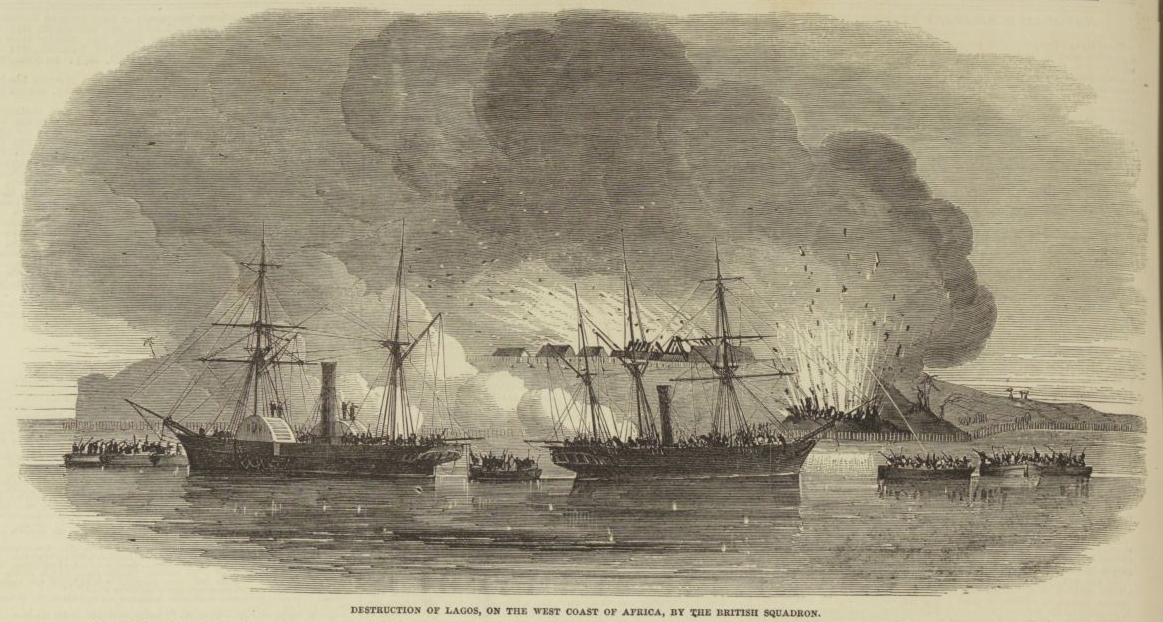
Newspaper illustration from 1852, showing the reduction of Lagos by British forces.

Akitoye was taken ashore on December 29 to assess the bombarded town. He accepted the loyalty of the chiefs and was installed as Oba of Lagos. On December 30, the Royal Navy dismantled all of Kosoko's batteries and dumped 46 of his war guns at sea.

== Treaty between Great Britain and Lagos, suppression of the slave trade ==
With Akitoye installed as Oba a new Treaty between Lagos and Great Britain was signed on January 1, 1852. The Treaty abolished the slave trade and human sacrifice, commencing the Consular period in Lagos history. This set the stage for Britain's annexation of Lagos a decade later in August 1861.

== In popular culture ==
In 2021, Nigerian artist Oludamola Adebowale created the 1851 Chess Agidingbi game to memorialize this event in Lagos and Nigerian history.
