= 1851 Agidingbi =

The 1851 Agidingbi Chess Game is a historical game and Nigeria's first variant of chess, designed by Nigerian culture activist and historian Oludamola Adebowale. It is "fashioned after the traditional chess board to teach the history of Lagos" and built to commemorate the 170th memorial anniversary of the Bombardment of Lagos by the British naval forces.

According to the inventor, Oludamola Adebowale, the game was invented as a way to make history fun, after the subject was removed from the Nigerian educational syllabus in 2015. The idea for the game, he said, came while he was at the Lagos Book and Art Festival.

== The origin of Agidingbi ==
The name Agidingbi is an onomatopoeia for the sounds made by the artillery guns that was fired by British forces on Lagos in 1851. The sound was so loud that it was heard in as far away as Badagry and the mainland of Lagos. The name was thus retained, and a part of Lagos today now bears it as its official name.

== The game ==
The 1851 Agidingbi Chess Game has the traditional checkered board design, with pieces named after Lagos royalties and chieftains like Erelu- Kuti of Lagos as the Queen Mother, the Oba of Lagos as the king, the Adamu Eyo as the rook, Omo Ogun Eko as the pawn, Eletu-Odibo as the bishop and Abagbon as the knight. People playing the game can play on either side, either as the defenders of Lagos or the British.
