= Barleycorn =

Barleycorn may refer to:

- A grain of barley
- Barleycorn (unit) a unit of length, equal to one-third of an inch
- Barleycorn (surname)
- The Barleycorn, an Irish traditional music band
- "John Barleycorn", a traditional British folk-song
- John Barleycorn (novel), by Jack London
