= Camille Silvy =

French photographer (1834–1910)

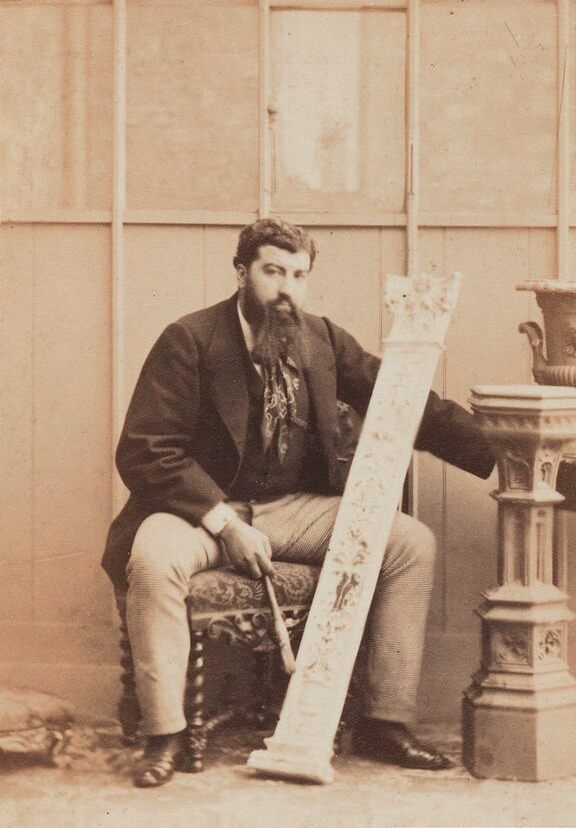
- Born: Camille-Léon-Louis Silvy; 18 March 1834; Nogent-le-Rotrou, Eure-et-Loir, France
- Died: 2 February 1910 (aged 75); Saint-Maurice, France
- Occupation: Photographer
- Years active: 1857–1870

Camille-Léon-Louis Silvy (18 March 1834 – 2 February 1910) was a French photographer, primarily active in London.

== Life and career ==
Silvy learned photography from his friend, Count Olympe Aguado, in 1857, and became a member of the Société française de photographie in 1858. He then moved to London and opened a portrait studio at 38 Porchester Terrace, Bayswater, becoming a member of the Photographic Society in 1859. Sitters in Silvy's portraits include Princess Mary Adelaide of Cambridge, Queen Emma of Hawaii, Lady Amberley, Harriet Martineau, Adelina Patti, Sarah Forbes Bonetta and Frederick Robson. He also photographed many members of the British royal family. The National Portrait Gallery, London, holds his studio's daybooks, which include details of some 17,000 sittings, with about 12,000 of these showing an image from the sitting.

Silvy closed his studio and returned to France in 1868. He believed that his nervous system had been damaged by exposure to potassium cyanide in the darkroom but it is more likely that he suffered from manic depression. The last thirty years of his life were spent in a succession of hospitals, sanatoria and convalescent homes. An English Heritage blue plaque commemorating Silvy was unveiled at 38 Porchester Terrace, London, on 16 July 2019.

== Gallery ==
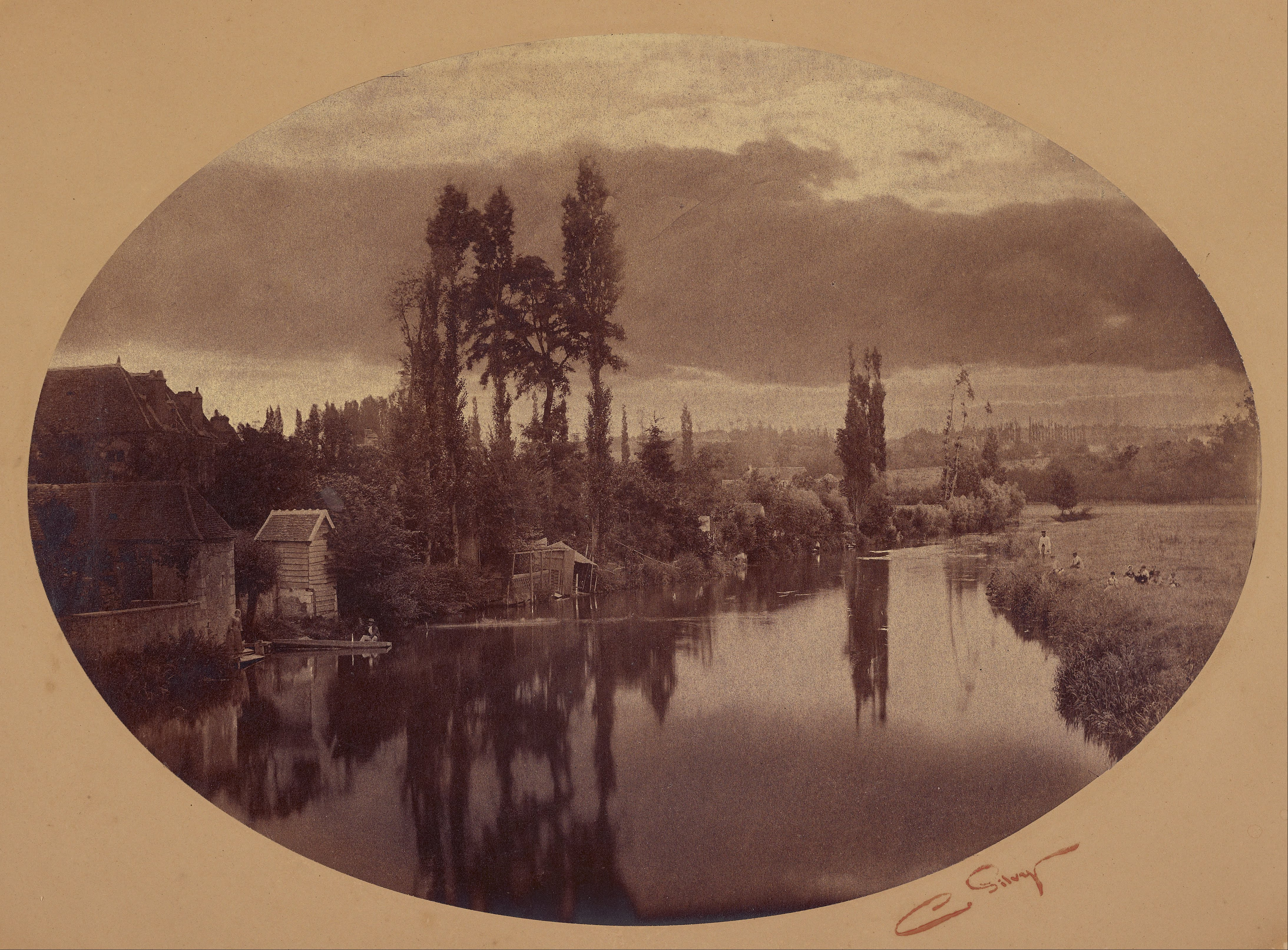
French river scene, 1858

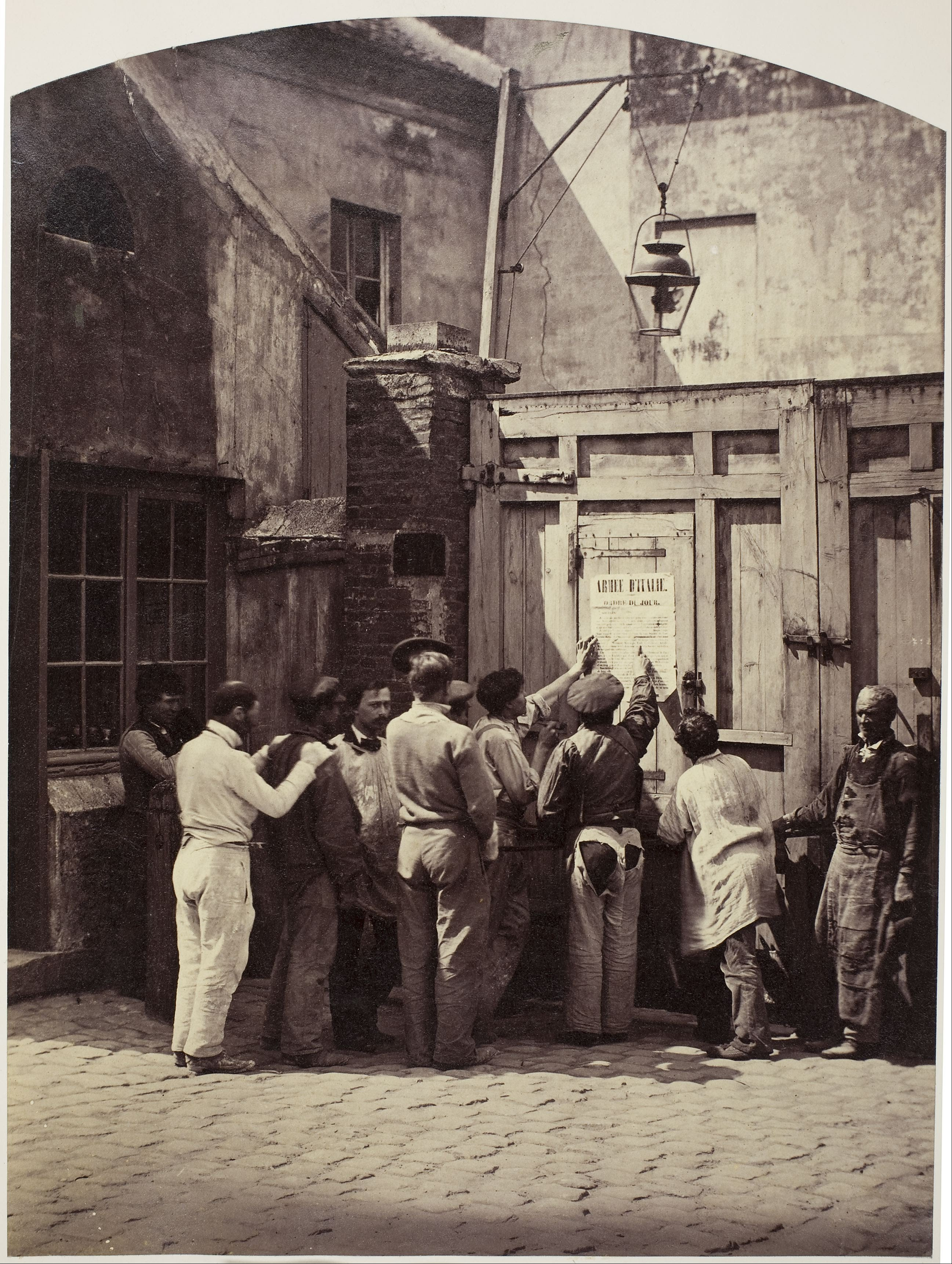
The Day's Orders, 1859

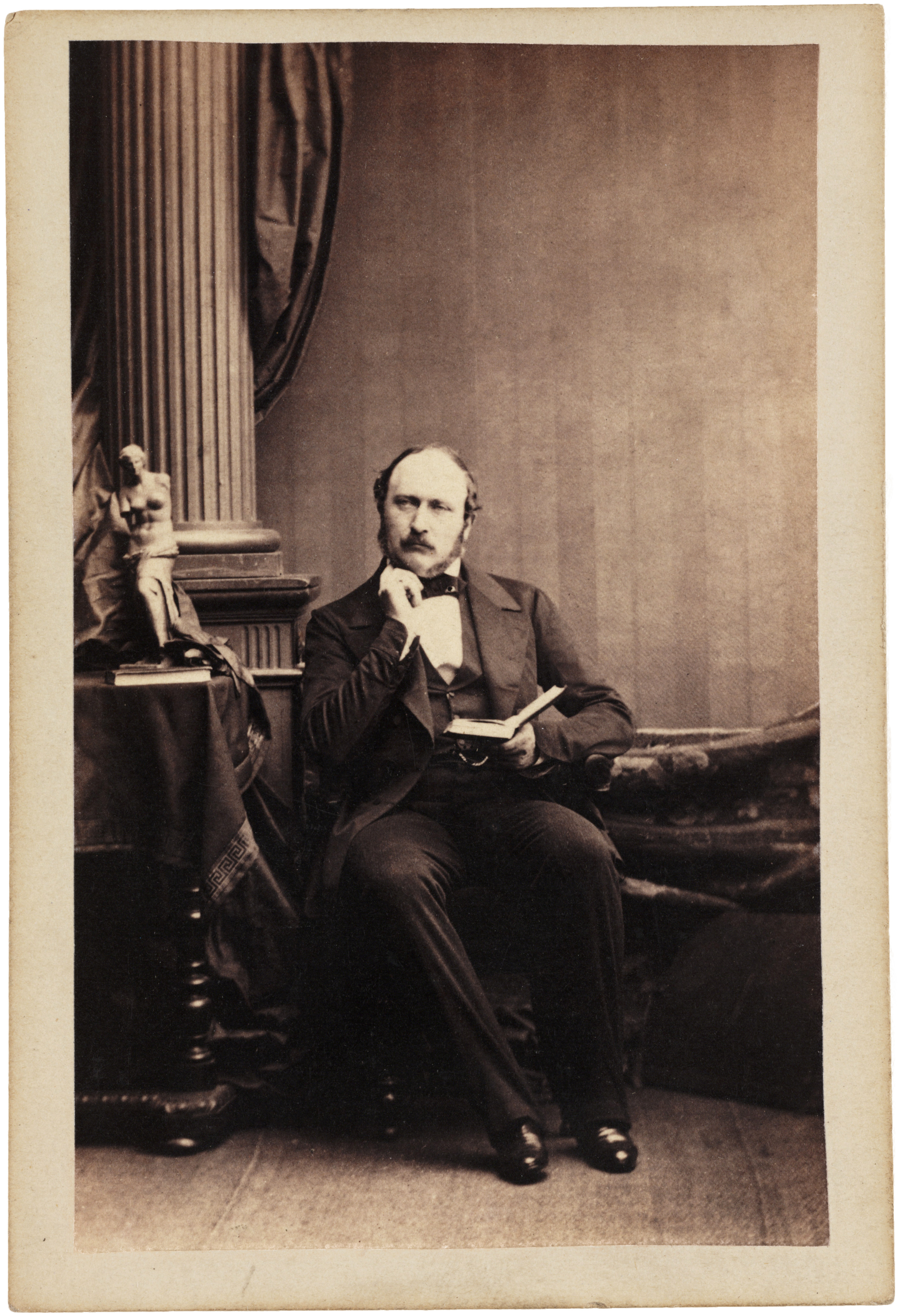
Albert, Prince Consort, c. 1859

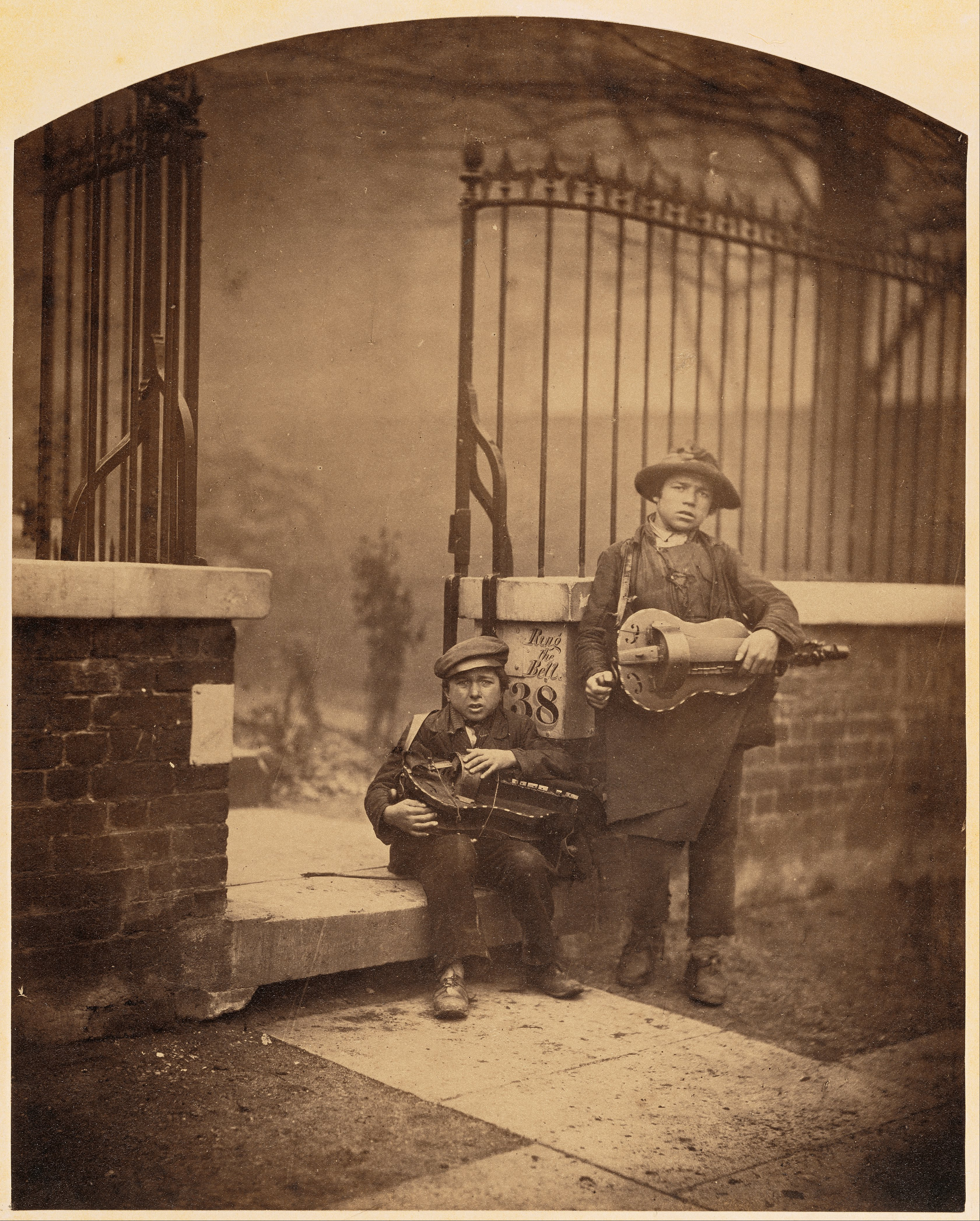
Street musicians, c. 1860

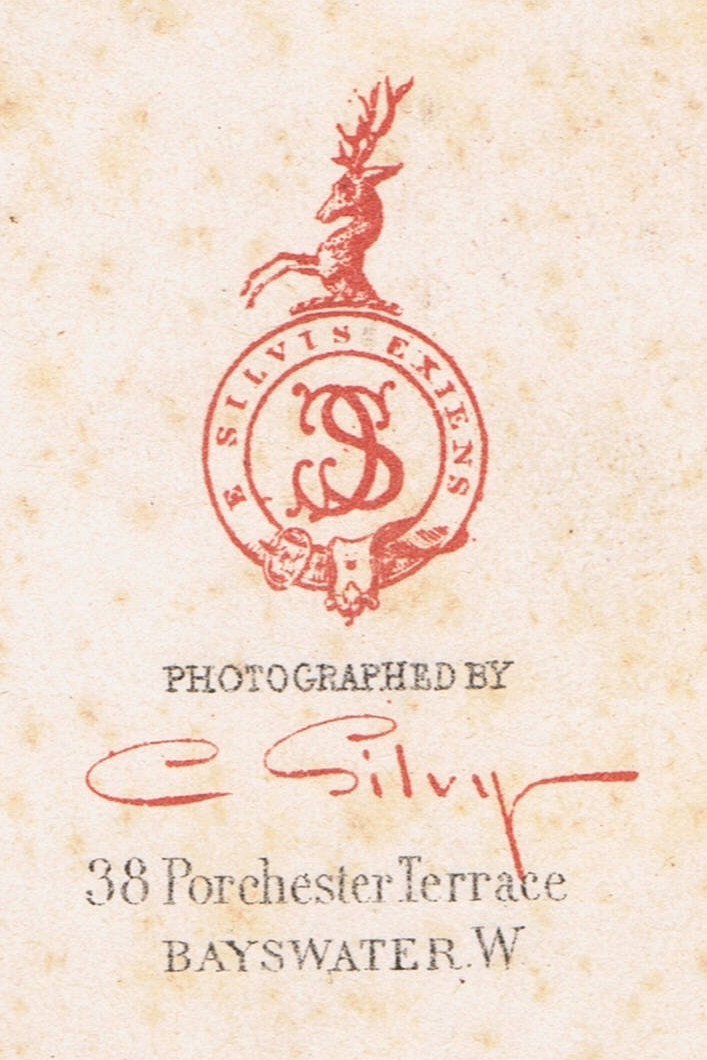
Detail of a reverse of a carte de visite showing Silvy's logo, 30 April 1861

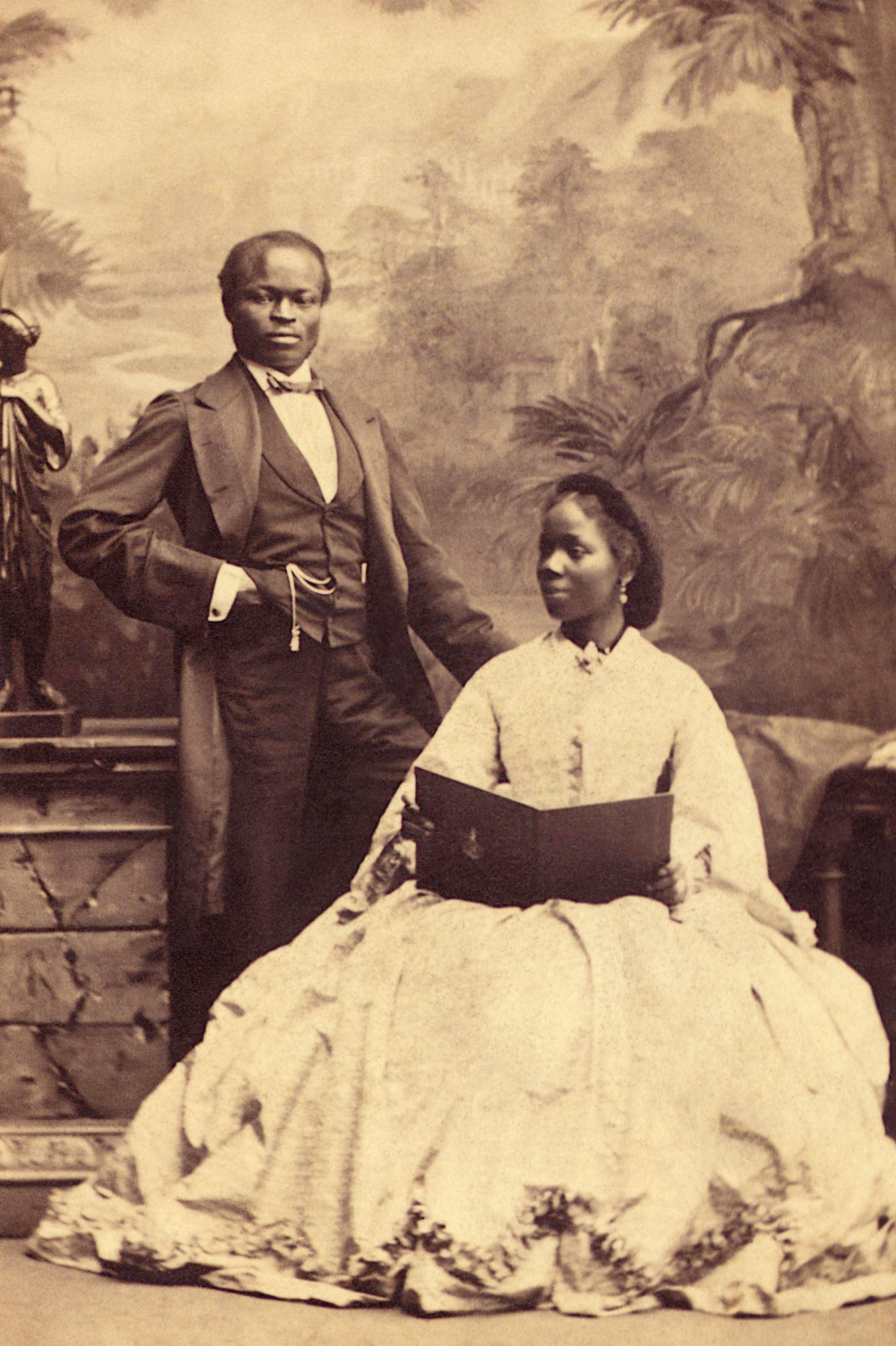
James Pinson Labulo Davies and Sarah Forbes Bonetta, 1862

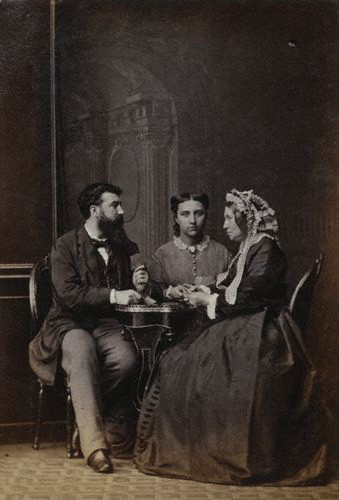
Camille Silvy with his wife and his mother, 1865

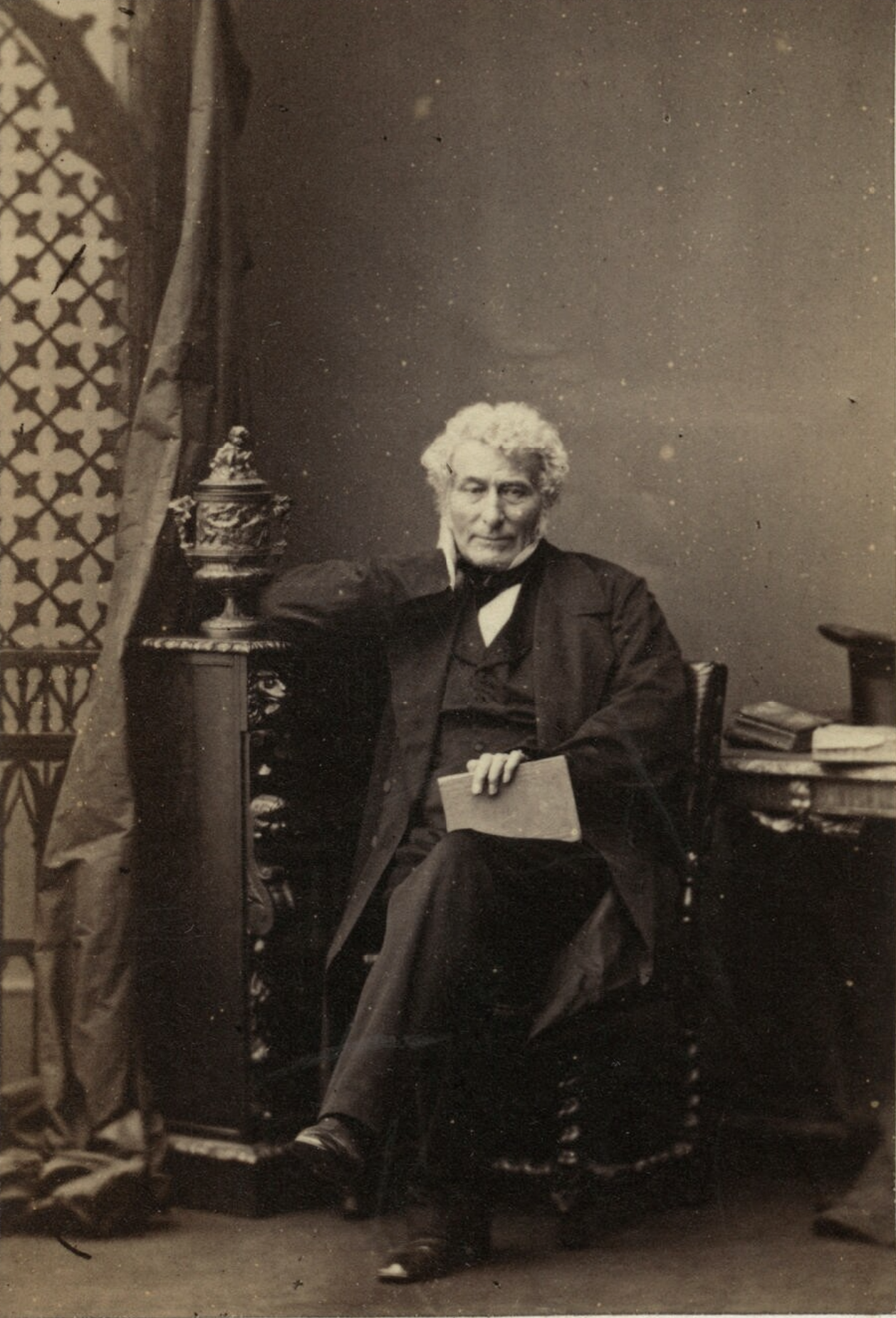
Edward Law, 1st Earl of Ellenborough, 1861
