= Idama =

Ijaw clan in Rivers State, Nigeria

The Idama (E'dama) clan of the Ijaw people lives in central Rivers State, Nigeria. This small clan is sometimes classified as a Kalabari tribe clan rather than as its own clan.

== Location ==
Idama is an island located in the mangrove forest of the oil rich Niger Delta area of Nigeria. It is part of the Akuku-Toru local government area of Rivers. Numerous settlements populate the Idama territory, which combine with the Idama clan to form the Idama Kingdom. The Idama clan is the major settlement in the kingdom, which serve as the headquarters. Idama kingdom, like other coastal kingdoms, is a low-lying land and is only few feet above sea level. It is situated in the southwestern part of Akuku Toru. It is an island on the bank of Idama Creek, a tributary of the Sombriero River (Olulo Toru) and the San Bartholemew River.

== History ==
Before King Amachree I became the ruler of the main Kalabari people at their "Elem Ama" or the shipping settlement near the north of the Atlantic Ocean in the New Calabar River, in the 17th century, and brought about the amalgamation and unification of the Kalabari kingdoms.

The Idama Community existed as a distinct and autonomous community. In the area presently occupied by the community between the axis of the San Bartholemew and Sombriero Rivers. The Idama people were Ijaws who migrated from Okpoin-Ama, the native place of the Idama people, in the present day Ijaw area of Bayelsa state, in pre-colonial days. The people left Okpoin-Ama in search of a better life, as Okpoin-Ama was frequently threatened by a devastating flood. Six headmen led the migration. They were Opu-adwein Ebe Otukpo Obio Akain Atumogoli. They were predominantly migrant fishers, settling in such notable places as Aba -Ama and Boro-Ama in the tributary of the San-Bartholomew river, Kala-Ekulama and Darima near Ke, in present-day Degema.

At Lele-Ama the people settled at a bush land in the interior, close to the open Sombriero River, a place they christened Okpoin-Ama after the recent place of the Ekulama people. The only people at that time around the Okpoin-Ama where the Ebema and Bille people. Ebema was founded by Ebe who moved from Okpoin-Ama to a dry land just across the Sombriero river on the opposite side of Okpoin-Ama and settled there with his family. While living at Ebema, Ebe the Amayanabo of Ebema became friends with Agbani, the Amayanabo of Bille. This relationship led Agbani to marry a woman from Ebema, who gave birth to a male child named Agbaniye-Okio.

Where is Ebema located today ?
