= Victoria Davies Randle =

West African princess (1863–1920)

Omoba Victoria Davies Randle
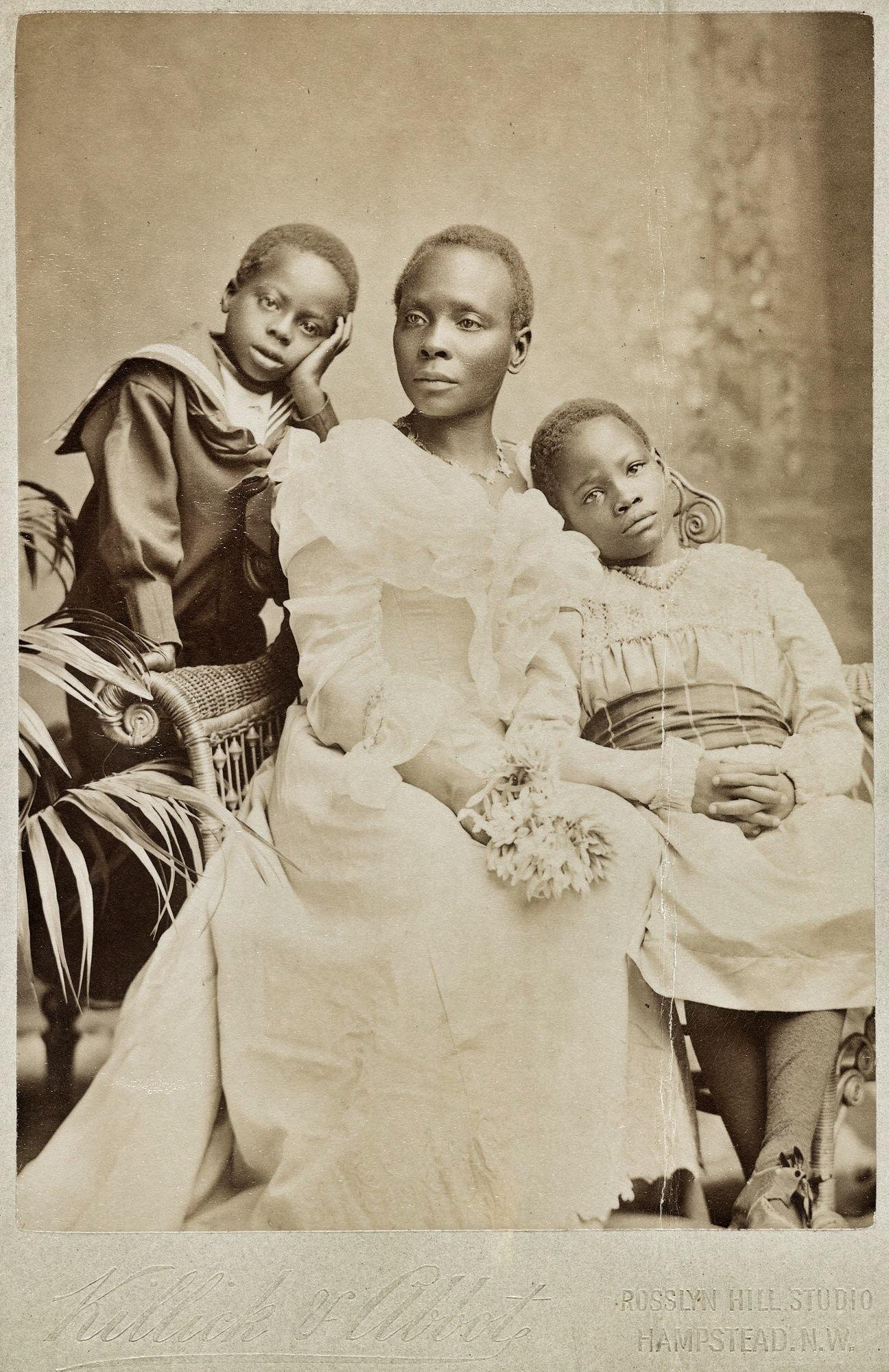
- Victoria Davies Randle with her two children, taken in a studio in London in 1901
- Born: Victoria Matilda Davies; 1863; Lagos Colony
- Died: 1920 (aged 56–57); Lagos
- Other name: Victoria Davies
- Occupation: Socialite
- Known for: Being the goddaughter of Queen Victoria
- Spouse: John Randle (m. 1890)
- Children: 2
- Parent(s): James Pinson Labulo Davies; Sarah Forbes Bonetta
- Relatives: Babatunde Kwaku Adadevoh; Ameyo Adadevoh

Victoria Matilda Davies Randle (née Davies; 1863 – 1920) was a socialite in Victorian Lagos Colony.

== Life ==
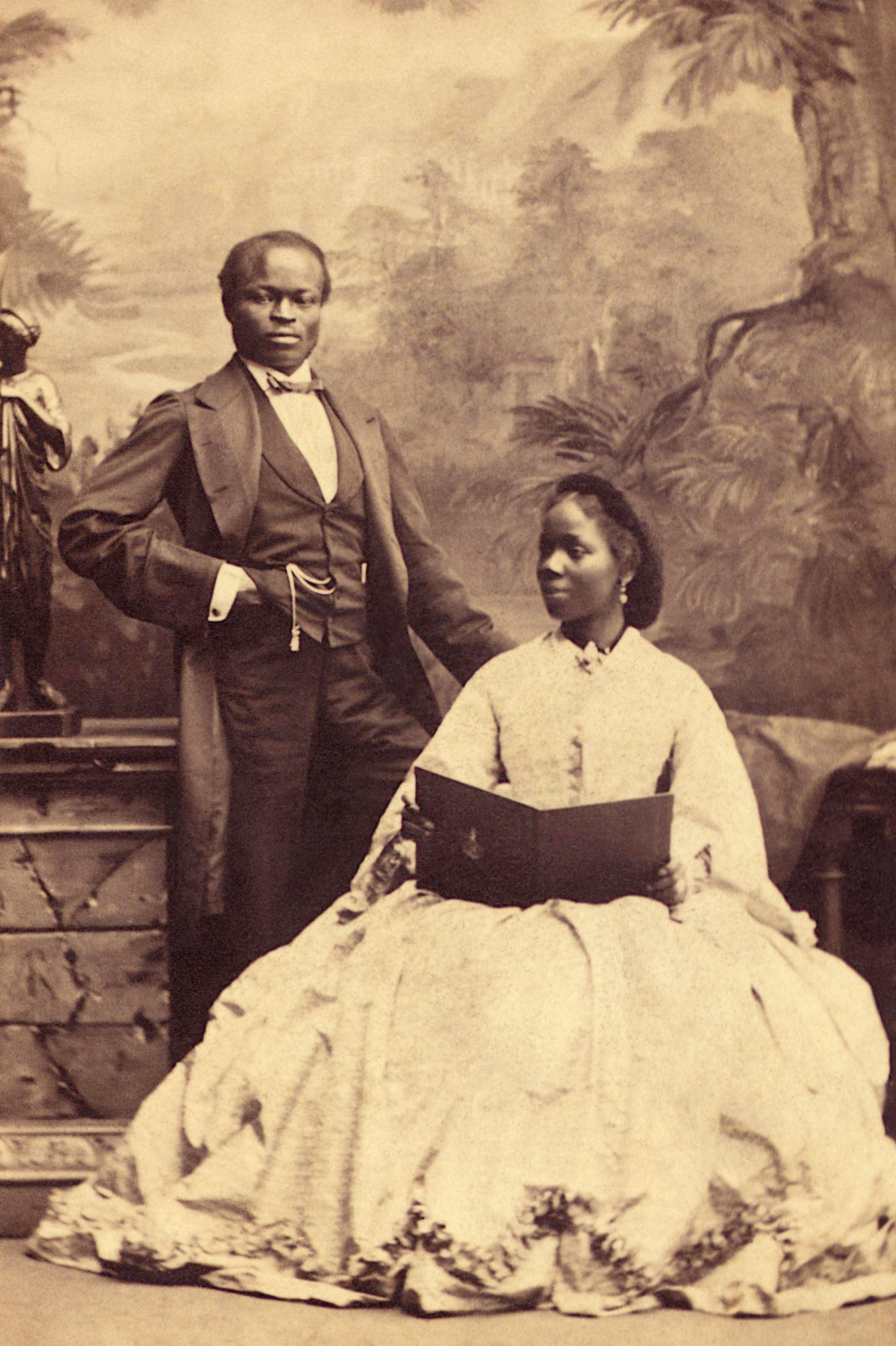
Victoria Davies' parents, Sarah Forbes Bonetta and James Pinson Labulo Davies, in 1862.

Victoria Davies was the eldest child of James Pinson Labulo Davies, a wealthy Lagos merchant, and Sarah Forbes Bonetta, an Egbado omoba who had been adopted as the goddaughter of Queen Victoria. When she was born in 1863, she was named in honour of the Queen, who accepted to be her godmother as well.

The queen provided her with both an annuity and a golden christening set, and later invited the younger Victoria to Windsor. She was educated at Cheltenham Ladies' College, and like her mother, she also showed considerable intelligence. In 1890, Victoria married Dr. John Randle, a West African Scottish-trained medical doctor, and two hundred guests - including the governor of the Lagos Colony – were in attendance at the wedding at St. Paul's Church in Lagos. The service was officiated by the Reverend James Johnson and her wedding gown was a careful selection of the queen's, as her own mother's had been years before.

Victoria Davies Randle later took her children Beatrice and John to visit her godmother in 1900, escorted by Bishop Johnson. In a continuation of tradition, Princess Beatrice then became her own daughter's godmother.

Her marriage eventually fell apart; she lived in exile with the children thereafter, first in the United Kingdom and then in Sierra Leone, only returning to Lagos in 1917. In London, Davies Randle had made the acquaintance of Samuel Coleridge-Taylor, the prodigy who would rise to become a prominent Black British musician. She was later mentioned by Coleridge-Taylor as the source of the Yoruba folk song in his collection, Oloba yale mi. Davies Randle provided Coleridge-Taylor with a Yoruba drum theme that he used in his Twenty-four Negro Melodies. Her final years were dedicated to the activities of the Ladies' Club, a group of upper-class women in Lagos.

She died in 1920. Her indirect descendants include the Nigerian-Ghanaian academic administrator Babatunde Kwaku Adadevoh and his daughter, the Nigerian doctor and national heroine Ameyo Adadevoh.

== See also ==
- Black British elite, the class that Davies Randle belonged to
- Nigerian aristocracy, the class that Davies Randle's mother belonged to
- Nigerian bourgeoisie, the class that Davies Randle's father belonged to
