= Sarah Forbes Bonetta =

West African princess (1840s–1880)

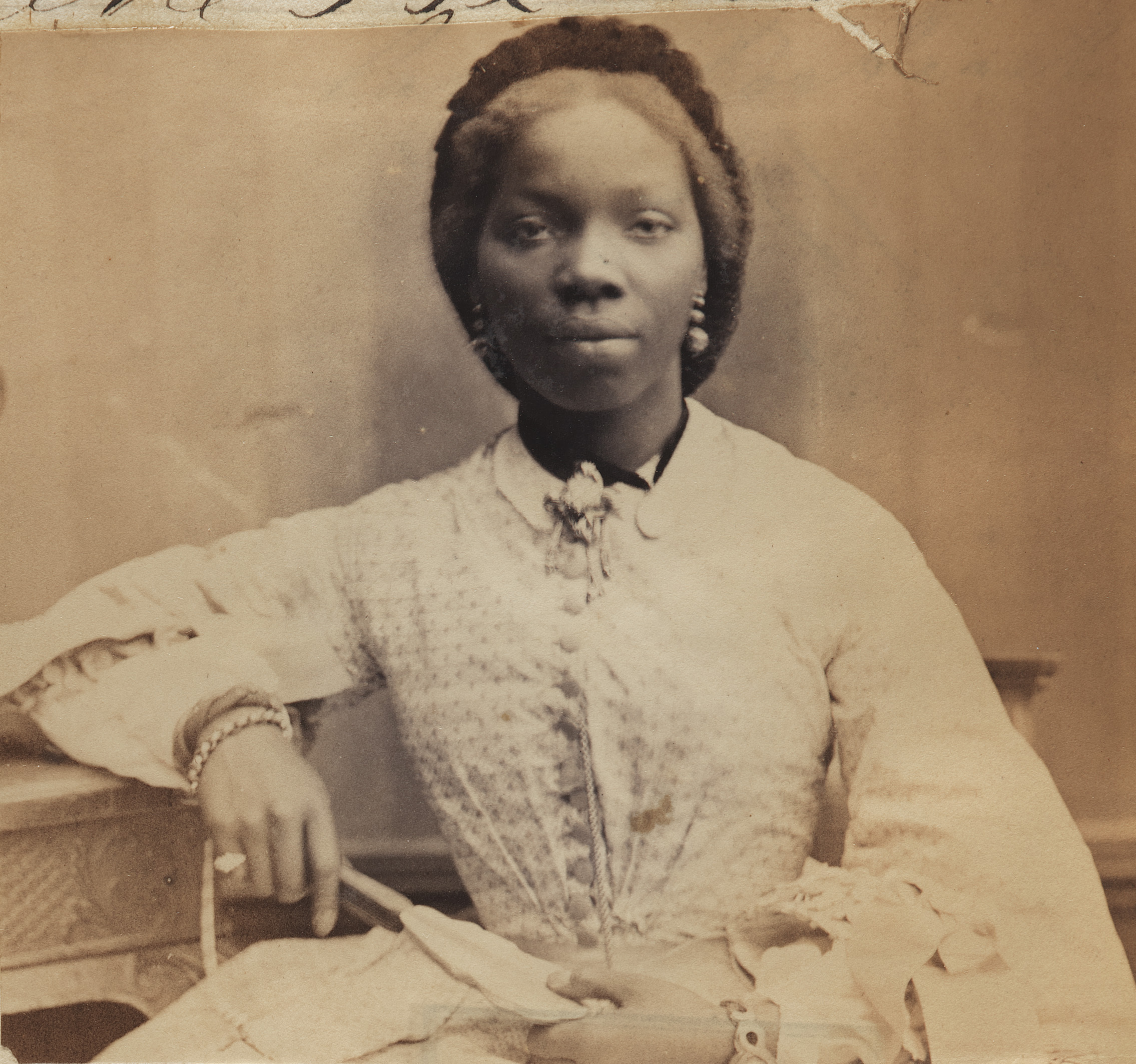
- Sarah Forbes Bonetta photographed by Camille Silvy in 1862
- Born: Aina (also Ina); 1843; Oke Odan, Yorubaland
- Died: 15 August 1880 (aged 36–37); Funchal, Madeira Island, Portugal
- Cause of death: Tuberculosis
- Resting place: Funchal, Madeira Island, Portugal
- Other names: Sarah Forbes Bonetta; Sally Forbes Bonetta
- Education: Female Institution Kissy, Sierra Leone. Palm Cottage, home of James and Elizabeth Schön
- Spouse: James Pinson Labulo Davies (m. 1862)
- Children: 4, including Victoria Davies
- Relatives: John Randle (son-in-law); Babatunde Kwaku Adadevoh (great grandson); Ameyo Adadevoh (great-great-granddaughter)

Sarah Forbes Bonetta (Note: Some sources say "Sara" instead of "Sarah".) or Sally Forbes Bonetta (born Aina or Ina; c. 1843 – 15 August 1880) (Note: Aina is a Yoruba name that describes the fact that she was born through a nuchal cord complication.) was enslaved in West Africa. She was given as a diplomatic gift, taken to England and apprenticed by Queen Victoria. She was captured and orphaned as a child from her hometown of Oke Odan in West Africa during a war with the nearby Kingdom of Dahomey under King Gezo. She spent two years in Abomey and Gezo gave her as a diplomatic "gift" to Captain Frederick E. Forbes of the British Royal Navy who went to Abomey to try to negotiate ending the slave trade in the kingdom, which he ultimately failed to do. He then petitioned the admiralty for her to become the "property of the crown," and presented her to Queen Victoria, who became her guardian. The Queen sent her to Sierra Leone to be educated among other "Liberated Africans." She then travelled to England where she was educated in Palm Cottage Chatham, until she was forced to marry Captain James Pinson Labulo Davies, a wealthy Lagos merchant. She would return to England another two times, and although unpublished, became one of the prolific Atlantic travel writers of her day.

== Early life ==
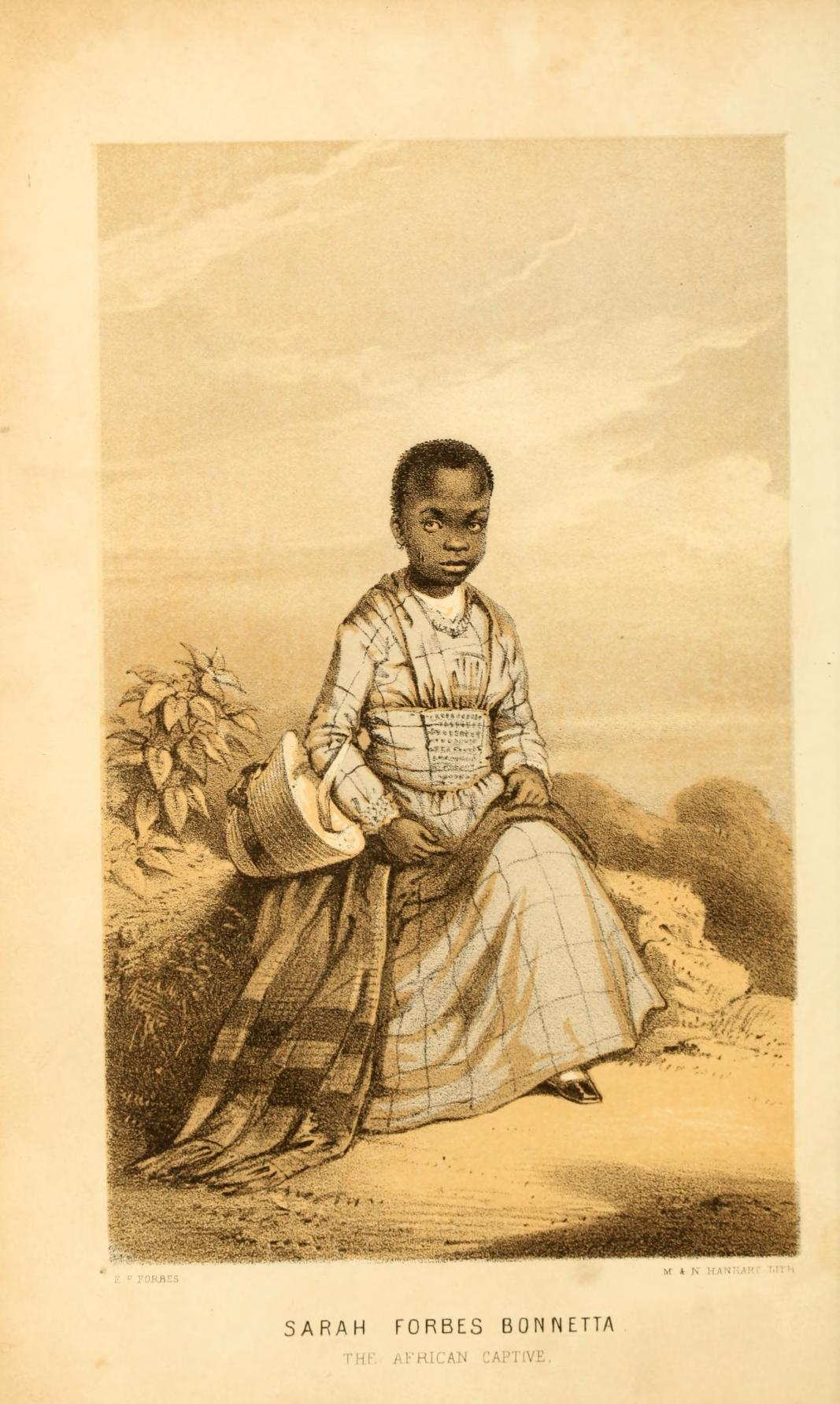
Lithograph of Forbes Bonetta, after a drawing by Frederick E. Forbes, from his 1851 book Dahomey and the Dahomans; being the journals of two missions to the king of Dahomey, and residence at his capital, in the year 1849 and 1850

Originally named Aina (or Ina), she was born in 1843 in Oke-Odan, a Yoruba village in West Africa which had recently formed by Egbado refugees during the collapse of the Oyo Empire (present-day southwestern Nigeria). Before 1823, Oyot had subjugated the Kingdom of Dahomey. Oyo and Dahomey began to engage in a war in 1823 after Gezo, the new King of Dahomey, refused to pay annual tributes to Oyo and asserted independence. During the conflict, Oyo was weakened and destabilised by the Islamic jihads launched by the growing Sokoto Caliphate. The Oyo Empire disintegrated by 1836. Dahomey's army subsequently began to expand eastwards into Oyo's former territory, including Egbado, capturing various towns and enslaving people in the process.

In 1848, Oke-Odan was invaded and captured by the army of Dahomey. Aina's parents were decapitated during the attack and other residents were either killed or sold into the Atlantic slave trade. Aina ended up in the court of King Gezo of Dahomey as a child slave for two years until Frederick Edwyn Forbes and John Beecroft went to the captial at Abomey. After the British abolition of slavery, Gezo fought against British attempts to curtail Dahomey's exportation of slaves, from which the kingdom profited greatly.

=== Captain Forbes at Dahomey ===
In July 1850, Captain Frederick E. Forbes and Consul John Beecroft of the Royal Navy arrived in West Africa on a British diplomatic mission, where he unsuccessfully attempted to negotiate with Gezo to end Dahomey's participation in the slave trade. As part of the diplomatic mission, Forbes witnessed the Annual Customs of Dahomey – a famous annual ceremony in which a series of tributes were paid to the king and sometimes captives were executed at the graves of Dahomey's deceased nobility. Toward the end of the custom, King Gezo presented the British diplomats with gifts, such as stools, textiles, and a girl each "to wash their clothes." Forbes accepted, noting in his journal that to refuse "would have been to have signed her death-warrant, which probably would have been carried into execution forthwith."

While one girl was taken to Fernando Po with Consul Beecroft, Forbes renamed the other girl Sarah Forbes Bonetta, after himself and his ship HMS Bonetta. He took her to England where British newspapers called Sarah Forbes Bonetta an "African Princess." Forbes then presented Sarah to Queen Victoria, who became her guardian and provided for her education as a type of apprenticeship per the terms of anti-slave trade law.

Although her actual ancestry is unknown, Forbes believed Aina to be of high-status origin, citing the tribal markings on her face and the fact that she had not been sold to European slave traders. In his journal he described her as one of "the best born", reserved for "the high behests of royalty and the immolation on the tombs of the deceased nobility". It is likely he claimed this royal ancestry to further his career, gain an audience with the Queen, and perhaps promote his book on the kingdom of Dahomey.

=== Queen Victoria's "Liberated African" ===
Captain Forbes Forbes never intended to raise the girl himself, had her baptized in St. Mary's Church Winkfield, where he and his sisters served as godparents. Due to Walter Dean Myer's youth novel, Sarah is frequently called the Queen's goddaughter which is untrue. Sarah was in essence indentured to the Queen, who paid for her travel and education in the Church Missionary Society's all-girls residential school, called the Female Institution, in Kissy, Sierra Leone. Queen Victoria wrote about Sarah in her journal. She was impressed by the young princess's "exceptional intelligence", and had the girl, whom she called Sally.

Rare bust of Sarah Forbes Bonetta

She returned to England in 1855, when she was about 13. She was entrusted to the care of Rev. Frederick Scheon and his wife Elizabeth, who lived at Palm Cottage, Canterbury Street Gillingham. The house survives and was a center of West African scholarship in England. Sarah lived with Dorugu who helped Schön produce the first Hausa-English dictionary. In January 1858, she was invited to and attended the wedding of Queen Victoria's daughter Princess Alice. Sarah learned to write and wrote numerous letters, which were transcribed in Walter Dean Myers youth novel.

Due to Sarah's relationship to the Queen, Sarah was well-educated and had at least sixteen known works of art produced of her in various mediums. She travelled to England on four different occasions, although she spent the vast majority of her life in West Africa. Her works of art included a daguerreotype, prints, paintings, photographs, and a bust. In 2025, Henry Lovejoy recently discovered the bust from a private collection.

At best, Sarah had a marginal relationship with the Queen. She is often portrayed in novels, film, television, and modern media as being very close to the royal family. However, historical evidence shows the relationship involved short and sporadic visits to Windsor Castle. The Queen frequently gave Sarah gifts, such as dresses, jewelry, and other things.

== Marriage and children ==
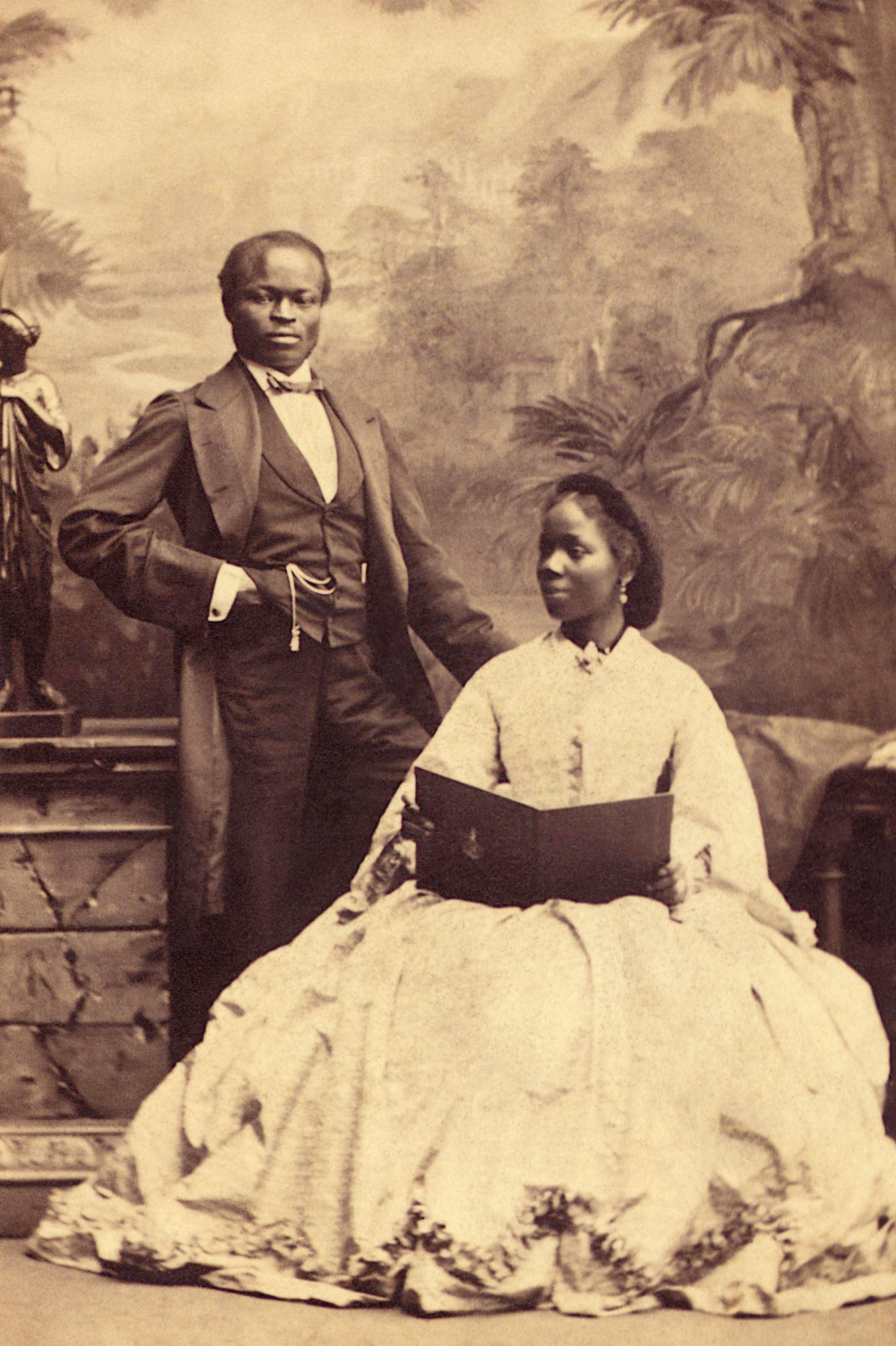
A portrait of James Pinson Labulo Davies and Sarah Forbes Bonetta, photographed in London in 1862 by Camille Silvy

Queen Victoria approved her marriage to Captain James Pinson Labulo Davies at St Nicholas' Church in Brighton, East Sussex, in August 1862, after a period spent in the town preparing for the wedding. During her subsequent time in Brighton, she lived at 17 Clifton Hill in the Montpelier area.

Captain Davies was a Yoruba businessman of considerable wealth, and after their wedding the couple moved to colonial Lagos, where they had four children: Victoria Davies (1863), Alice Davies (1865), Arthur Davies (1871), and Stella Davies (1873). Following the births, she began to work as a teacher. (Note: The cited books in the Further reading section state that she was the Acting Principal of CMS Female Institution in 1870; the school was founded in 1869, the first principal was Mrs. Annie Roper, wife of Reverend Roper of CMS Mission Ijaiye. Mrs. Forbes Bonetta Davies was succeeded by Rev. and Mrs. Henry Townsend.) Sarah Forbes Bonetta had various relationship with prominent members of the Church Missionary Society, such as Henry Venn, Owen Emeric Vidal, and Samuel Ajayi Crowther.

Victoria Matilda Davies, Bonetta's first daughter, was named after Queen Victoria, who was her godmother. She married the successful Lagos doctor Dr. John Randle, becoming the stepmother of his son, Nigerian businessman and socialite J. K. Randle. Bonetta's third daughter Stella Davies and Herbert Macaulay, the grandson of Samuel Ajayi Crowther, had a daughter together: Sarah Abigail Idowu Macaulay Adadevoh, named after her maternal grandmother Sarah and her paternal grandmother Abigail. A descendant of Bonetta's through her line was the Ebola heroine Ameyo Adadevoh. Many of Bonetta's other descendants now live in either the United Kingdom or Sierra Leone; a separate branch, the Randle family of Lagos, remains prominent in contemporary Nigeria and in England.

== Death and legacy ==
Sarah Forbes Bonetta died of tuberculosis on 15 August 1880 in the city of Funchal, the capital of Madeira Island, a Portuguese island in the Atlantic Ocean. Her legacy is often confused. She is frequently the Queen’s goddaughter, however she technically wasn't.

In her memory, her husband erected an over-eight-foot granite obelisk-shaped monument at Ijon in Western Lagos, where he had started a cocoa farm. The inscription on the obelisk reads:

IN MEMORY OF PRINCESS SARAH FORBES BONETTA

WIFE OF THE HON J.P.L. DAVIES WHO DEPARTED THIS LIFE AT MADEIRA AUGUST 15TH 1880

AGED 37 YEARS

Her grave is number 206 in the British Cemetery of Funchal near the Anglican Holy Trinity Church, Rua Quebra Costas Funchal, Madeira. A plaque commemorating Forbes Bonetta was placed on Palm Cottage in 2016, as part of the television series Black and British: A Forgotten History. A newly commissioned portrait of Forbes Bonetta by artist Hannah Uzor went on display at Osborne House on the Isle of Wight in October 2020 as part of an effort by English Heritage to recognise black history in England. She has also been painted by Joy Labinjo. Forbes Bonetta was portrayed by Zaris-Angel Hator in the 2017 British ITV television series Victoria. Victoria Princewill, the British novelist, has written a coming-of-age novel based on Bonetta's life, called The Diary of Sarah Forbes Bonetta.

A mural of Bonetta was included in a series of murals displayed in Gillingham between 2022 and 2023 as part of Medway Libraries' Circle of Six project.

In 2026, Henry Lovejoy published the biography Becoming Sarah Forbes Bonetta: A Yorùbá Woman in Queen Victoria’s Court, which has corrected many of the historical inaccuracies about Sarah's life, including how she was not an "African Princess" or the Queen's goddaughter. He argues she was apprenticed to Queen Victoria as a "Liberated African." In an October 2026 interview, Bonetta's great-great-grandson Bayo Randle said, "Whether [Lovejoy’s] book is comfortable for me is beside the point. [...] Where the real discomfort lies is in what [Bonetta] was the symbol of, what she was used for." He added that Bonetta was "very capable, courageous and dignified through adversity".

== Gallery ==
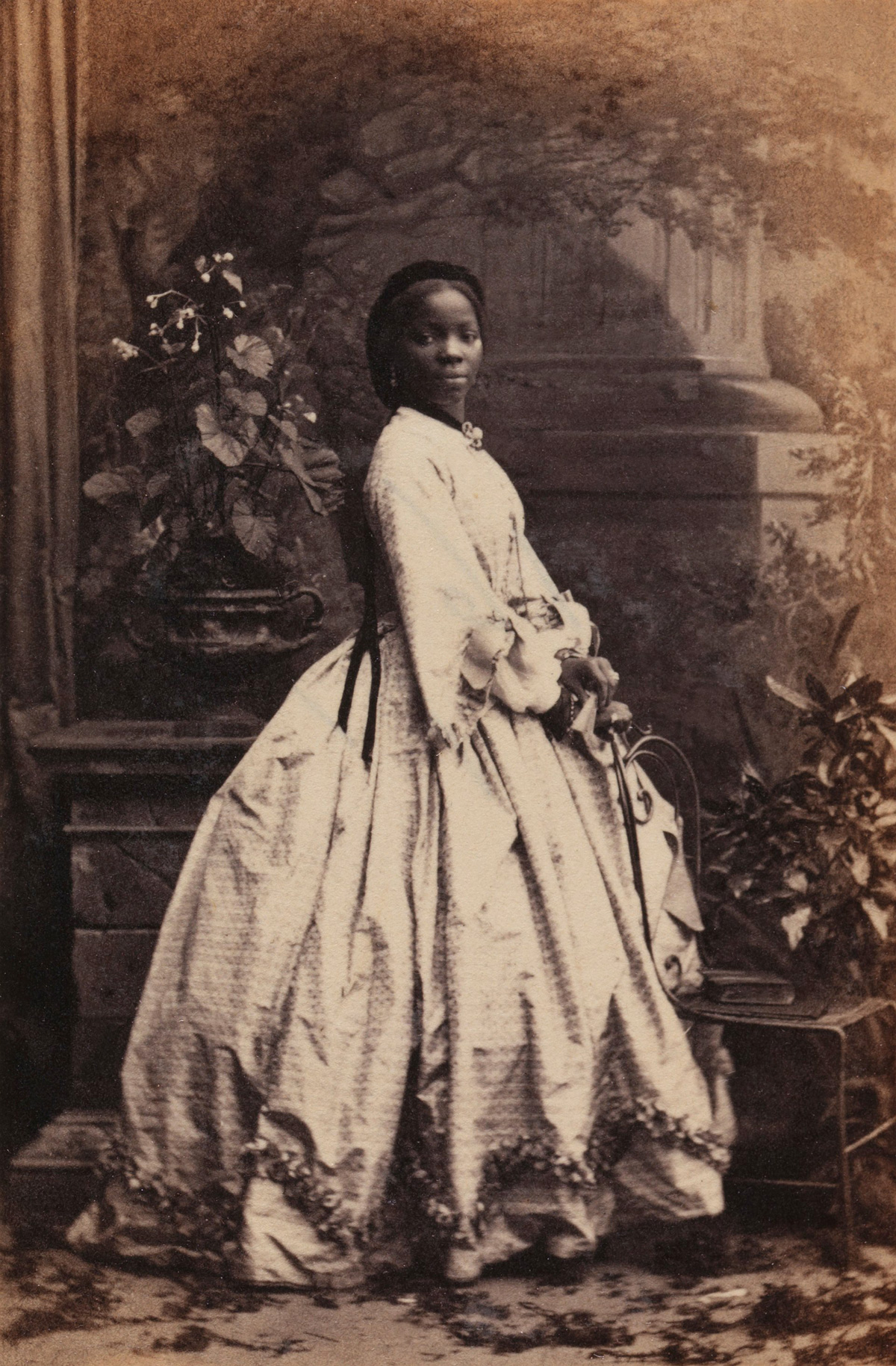
Sarah Forbes Bonetta photographed in 1862 by Camille Silvy

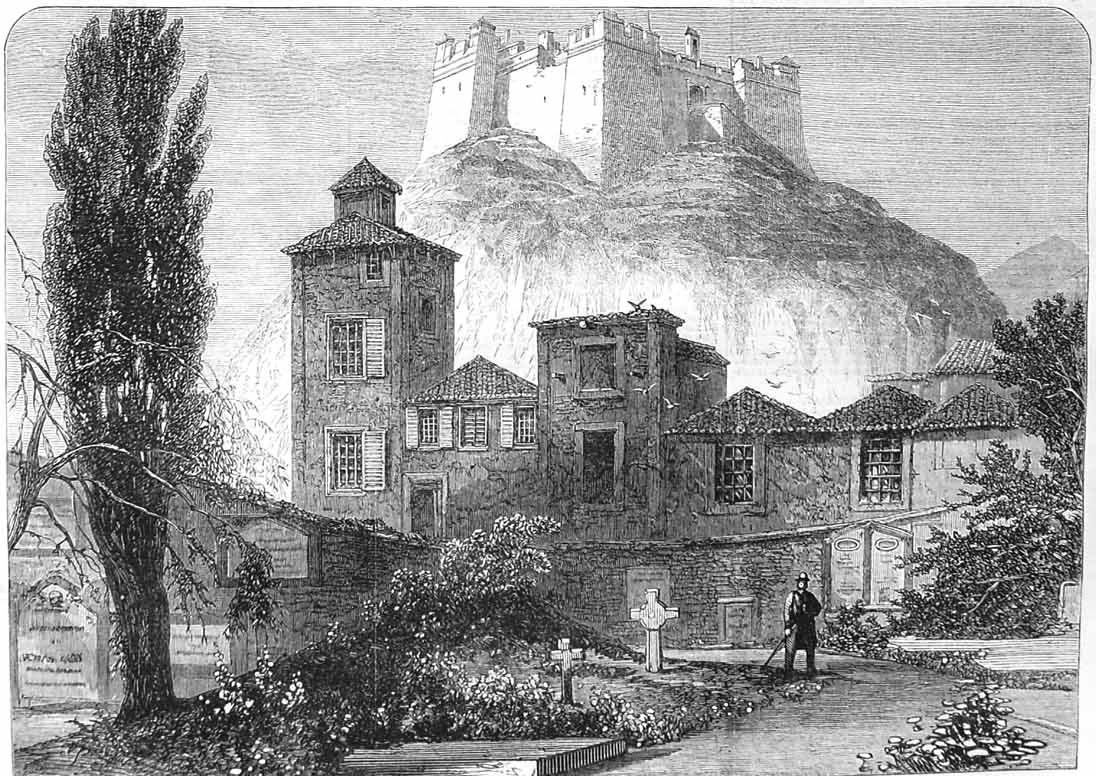
The English Cemetery in Funchal, Madeira

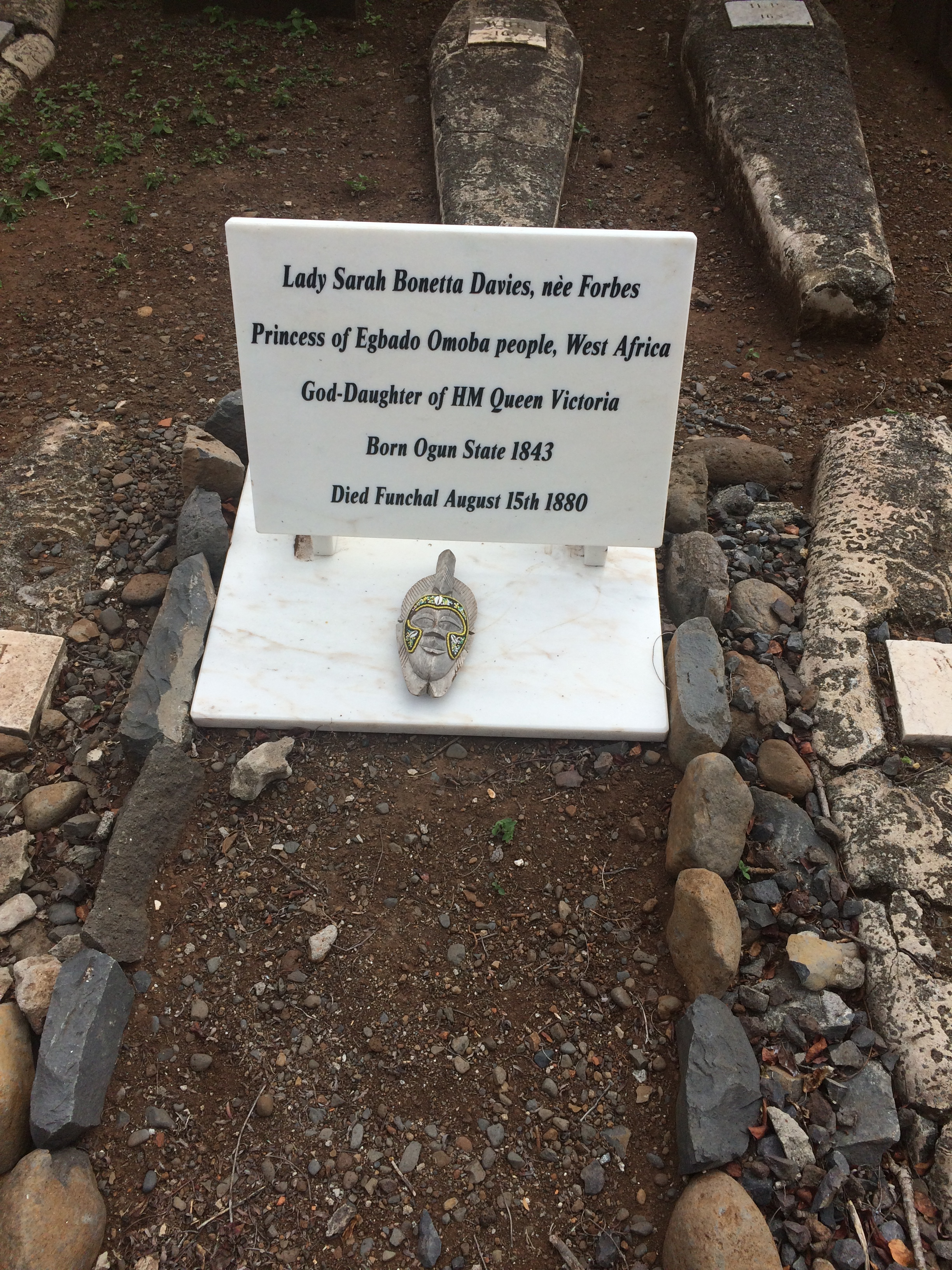
Sarah Forbes Bonetta's gravestone, Madeira

== See also ==
- Black British elite, the class that Forbes Bonetta belonged to
- Nigerian aristocracy, the class that Forbes Bonetta belonged to
- Nigerian bourgeoisie, the class that Forbes Bonetta married into
