= Edward Thaddeus Barleycorn Barber =

African medical doctor (1865–1948)

Thaddeus Barleycorn-Barber
- Born: 1 July 1865; Santa Isabel, Fernando Po
- Died: January 1948 (aged 82–83); Aba, Nigeria
- Education: University of Edinburgh
- Occupation: Medical Doctor

Thaddeus Barleycorn-Barber (1 July 1865 – January 1948) was a medical doctor who was born in Santa Isabel, capital of the Spanish colony on the island of Fernando Po in West Africa. He graduated from Edinburgh University in 1892.

He was one of the first black African students in York, England, and is presumably linked with William Barleycorn, the first native Primitive Methodist minister in Fernando Po. Other leading Creole families in Fernando Po (now Bioko) around this time included the Barleycorn family, as well as Vivour, Jones, Kinson, Dougan, Grange, Davies, Balboa, Knox, Coker and Collins. An ancestral link has been suggested with Francis Barber, Samuel Johnson's man-servant. His Barber surname was from Sierra Leone Creoles who settled in Fernando Po.

== Early years and first experience in Britain ==
There is little information about the early years of Thaddeus Barleycorn-Barber. Elmfield College records show him as entering in September 1886 and leaving in April 1887. He was the son of "Mrs Julia Barleycorn-Barber" of "Calle de Rene, Santa Isabel".

Records from the University of Edinburgh show that he was educated for five years at the C. M. (Church Missionary) Grammar school in Sierra Leone, West Africa. It is estimated that he would have been aged 12–17 during this period. He would have been sent to Sierra Leone to study since Fernando Po only offered minimal education in Spanish and he was from the English-speaking Creole tribe. Sierra Leone offered English-based education, at the time, with such schools as the Church Missionary Grammar School, and the then prestigious Fourah Bay College still in existence today.

The records also showed that he then travelled to Britain to study the equivalent of A-Levels at Elmfield College in York aged 18, which would have been in 1886–1887. He spent a year at Elmfield College, before proceeding to Edinburgh University aged 19 years. Elmfield College was opened in 1864 and soon took a foremost place among the middle-class schools in England. It was established as a Primitive Methodist boarding school. In October 1887, while at Elmfield, his "interesting recitation" at the Victoria Bar Primitive Methodist Chapel in York, "for which he was enthusiastically applauded", was reported in the local newspaper.

== Edinburgh University ==
When Thaddeus Barleycorn Barber first enrolled at Edinburgh University in 1887, the records showed that his address was 8 Brighton Terrace, Joppa, Edinburgh, and later at 3 Valleyfield St, Edinburgh.

Prior to starting his medical degree at Edinburgh University, he studied preliminary courses and examinations, which he took at Edinburgh University during 1887–1888 and matriculated in 1888, taking examinations in English language and literature, history and geography, mathematics, Latin, French, natural philosophy and mechanics, in the last of which he passed "with credit".

His medical course started in 1888 and covered many subjects, including botany, anatomy, surgery, midwifery, pathology and pharmacy. He sat both oral and written exams, with his final medical professional exams taking place in June 1892, when he graduated with a Bachelor's degree in Medicine and a Master's in Surgery.

== See also ==
- Edward Barleycorn
- Napoleon Barleycorn
