= Victoria Princewill =

English novelist (born 1990)

Victoria Princewill FRSA
- Victoria Princewill in 2020
- Born: 1990 (age 35–36); Manchester, England
- Education: Oxford University; University College London
- Occupation: Novelist
- Notable work: In the Palace of Flowers (2021)
- Awards: Historical Association Young Quills Award – Highly Commended (2024)

Victoria Princewill (born 1990) is an English writer and novelist best known for her historical fiction.

She is the author of two books: In the Palace of Flowers (2021) and The Diary of Sarah Forbes Bonetta (2023). In the Palace of Flowers was named one of the Top 5 Books of 2021 by Times Radio presenter Mariella Frostrup.

In 2024, Princewill received a Highly Commended distinction in the Historical Association’s Young Quills Award for Best Historical Fiction for Young People, for her young adult novel, The Diary of Sarah Forbes Bonetta.

== Early life and education ==
Princewill was born in Manchester in 1990. She is a descendant of the Princewill royal family of the Kalabari Kingdom, a traditional state in Nigeria's Niger Delta. In her 2021 essay for Granta, Princewill reflected on her heritage and ancestral ties to the region's ruling structures.

She graduated in 2012 with a Bachelor of Arts in English Language and Literature from Keble College, Oxford University. She completed a Master of Arts in Philosophy at University College London in 2015. She also received an MA (Oxon) in English in 2019. As of 2021, she was pursuing a Master of Science in neuroscience at King's College London.

== Writing ==
=== In the Palace of Flowers ===
Princewill's debut novel, In the Palace of Flowers, was published in 2021 by Cassava Republic Press.

Set in the Qajar court of Iran in 1894, In the Palace of Flowers is inspired by one of the only available first-person accounts of a black woman enslaved there. Princewill tells the story of the lesser known Trans-Saharan slave trade, where the enslaved, concubines and eunuchs with access to wealth and power were educated. The novel follows Jamila and Abimelech, two Abyssinians, navigating the politics of the opulent and sinister Persian court. This takes place amidst rising nationalism, a little over a decade before the Persian Constitutional Revolution.

In the Palace of Flowers was named as one of the Top 5 Books of 2021 by Times Radio by Mariella Frostrup, Best books of 2021 by African Arguments, the Royal African Society's online magazine, and was specially recommended by Harvard.

Paul Spalding-Mulcock, reviewing it in the Yorkshire Times, declared, "Victoria Princewill's debut [...] a compelling example of historical fiction at its finest" adding that "her prose is a thing of measured, elegant beauty."

Samira Sawlani, Al-jazeera journalist and co-founder of the Bare Lit Festival said "Through beautiful prose the hugely gifted Victoria Princewill transports us to another time and world, telling a story which has one wholly absorbed. Love, danger, politics, history and art, In The Palace of Flowers is a sweepingly stunning tale that has it all."

Minna Salami praised her "captivating storytelling skills and impressive historical knowledge," describing the book as "an awe-inspiring, dynamic and powerful novel about a part of African history that few other writers have told". Calling the book "restorative" and "illuminating," she wrote that it "gripp[ed] the reader's mind with vivid and seductive language".

Writing about it for Electric Literature, Megan Benard called it a "deeply moving and beautiful account of a woman trying to find the freedom she's always lacked" and included In the Palace of Flowers in her 11 books about misunderstood women in history.

Aincre Evans, a feminist scholar of African feminist theory and a DPhil candidate at Oxford, listed In the Palace of Flowers as one of their 5 must-read African Feminist Books, referring to "Princewill [as having] weave[d] a beautiful plot of politics, love, resistance, and history into being."

On her impetus for writing In the Palace of Flowers, Princewill has stated that Jamila

had written a letter that detailed her existence but only really her ancestry and her status as an enslaved woman in Iran and the men between whom she was sold. Hers was the only readily available story and the mere fact that it had survived when there was a concerted effort to erase the history of Abyssinians in Iran made me determined to do justice to what I took to be her own perseverance and to give her the humanity she had been denied.

=== The Diary of Sarah Forbes Bonetta ===
Princewill's second and latest novel, The Diary of Sarah Forbes Bonetta: A Novel, is a coming-of-age young adult novel, published by Scholastic. It is inspired by Sarah Forbes Bonetta, the multilingual African princess turned orphan who was transported to England and raised as a ward of Queen Victoria. The novel was Highly Commended for the Historical Association's Young Quills Award 2024, and longlisted for the Diverse Book Awards 2024.

A young reader wrote, '"Overall, this book has made me realize that I have a voice, and that I should use it. It has made me feel a sense of empowerment of knowing my self worth and boundaries. It has changed me as a person; for the better."' Emily Bearn, reviewing The Diary of Sarah Forbes Bonetta in The Daily Telegraph, called it "highly engaging", noting that, "Victoria Princewill skillfully reimagines [Bonetta's] story." Giving it 4/5 stars, Bearn added that "[Princewill]'s real skill is to create a convincing Victorian heroine to whose emotional highs and lows any modern reader will relate."

=== Other ===
Princewill's essay for Granta, "What's in a name?" explored British Vogue's revelation that Thandiwe Newton, the British actress, was erroneously called Thandie Newton for many years, and how naming works as a social experience, writing about her own family name: "Our names, and selves, function, first, in social spaces, as reflections echoed back to us." The essay was named among Literary Hub's "Best of the Literary Internet" roundup for July 6–10, 2021.

She has written for n+1, the Guardian, and the London Review of Books, among other publications.

== Publications ==
- In the Palace of Flowers. Cassava Republic. 2021. ISBN 978-1911115755.
- The Diary of Sarah Forbes Bonetta: A Novel. Scholastic. 2023. ISBN 9780702311482.
