= William Vivour =

19th century planter from Equatorial Guinea

William Allen Vivour (fl. 1830–1890) was the single most successful 19th-century planter in Africa due to his substantial and flourishing cocoa plantation in Fernando Po (Equatorial Guinea). He was the son of a recaptive from present day Lagos and resettled in Sierra Leone by the British West Africa Squadron, and eventually settled in present day Equatorial Guinea and Nigeria.

== Historical context ==
In 1807, Britain outlawed the African slave trade, took over Sierra Leone and called its capital Freetown. It was there that all Africans freed from attempted enslavement on the high seas were settled and educated. Between 1807 (when the slave trade was outlawed) and 1863 (when the last slaving ship was captured), about 50,000 Africans were released and set free in Freetown. Many returned home, but many also remained in Freetown. Notable among these were Bishop Samuel Ajayi Crowther, Crispin Curtis Adeniyi-Jones, Samuel Johnson (History of Yorubas author), Christopher Sapara Williams, James Pinson Labulo Davies, and Thomas Babington Macaulay (founder of CMS grammar school).

Education was universal; their common language was English, they were Christians and they were free. These new Africans became known as the Sierra Leone Creoles or Krios. They became the leaders and developers of the western area of Africa, and above all they looked at the white man as equals and expected to be so treated in turn. By 1827, they had a college of higher education, and by 1845 they had a grammar school for boys and girls. By 1864, their first bishop was consecrated in England.

== Family ==
A branch of the family trace the name Vivour to a transliteration of the name Viavo. A name indigenous to Badagry area of Lagos, where their ancestor was kidnapped. Some have postulated that Vivour is a contraction of the word Survivor, which is related to the circumstances that led to his father's arrival at Sierra Leone,

Most likely the origin of the name comes both circumstances.

William Allen Vivour was born in Sierra Leone and had four siblings (two brothers and two sisters) which included Sally Vivour (grandmother to Robert Wellesley Cole) and Jacob Vivour.

By 1855, William Allen Vivour migrated from Sierra Leone to set up his base in Nigeria and Fernando Po.

"About the middle of last century, my father’s eldest uncle, William Allen Vivour, returned to Nigeria (Lagos) and set up his business in Fernando Po. With his success, he educated his two brothers in Europe, including the doctor, and sustained his sisters in Freetown comfortably."

Jacob Vivour (known also as Jacob Vivour Pratt) was enrolled as a pupil at Monkton Combe School in Somerset from 1879 to 1881, before going on to study law at Christ Church, Oxford University. He obtained his law degree in 1887, then went to Edinburgh where he studied medicine, qualified as a doctor in 1895, and returned to Nigeria where he set up his practice in Eastern Nigeria.

== Palm oil trade ==
On arrival at Fernando Po, W. A. Vivour entered the trade of palm oil and yams with the indigenous Bubi tribes. This involved the collection of the palm oil fruits by the Bubi which were then sold to merchants like Vivour. With time he had saved enough money to buy a schooner from John Holt with the aim to expand his palm oil business. On 16 March 1871, he purchased a schooner boat from Holt to use in the yam and palm oil trade.

The following year Holt's assistant W. J. Jones wrote that the black merchant was thriving:

"Vivour has come back, he looks first rate and is going to ship his oil direct if he can... I am sorry he has come back as he will not do the trade any good."

W. A. Vivour's interest in palm oil grew so significant that it brought him into direct conflict with King Jaja of Opobo in the time leading up to the Jaja-Ibeno War.

At the time, Vivour was trading directly with Liverpool and had established trading factories on the Kwa Ibo; to achieve this, he had agreements with the Ibeno hierarchy. Ibeno sovereignty was independent of Jaja's Opobo. Jaja himself knew this and said, "Although I had no claim to the territory near the mouth of the Qua Eboe River, Mr. Vivour would still have no right to trade there, for any oil which he could get would either be bought in or drawn from my markets".

At last dialogue between the Opobo and the Ibeno failed. Jaja did not take it kindly to see the same Liverpool traders whom he sent away from Opobo because of their free trade policy, establishing trading factories on the Kwa Ibo. About twenty eight of them including George Watts, Henry Watts, Holt and Vivour had agreements with the Ibeno hierarchy. Nevertheless, Jaja's threat for war was ignored by the Ibeno. European traders told Ibeno chiefs not to exercise any fear that ‘Whatever rights Jaja has at Opobo were conferred by Her Majesty’s Consul and no rights whatever were given to him over the Qua Iboe people’.

Vivour prospered in the lucrative palm oil trade until the palm oil boom came to an end due to the general decline in oil prices by 1861. Prices had declined from £37 per ton, from 1861 to 1865, to £20 per ton, from 1886 to 1890. Prices fell by half and expansion leveled off in the late 1870s and in the 1880s. In major centers like Opobo, exports declined and by the 1880s settlers began to secure land from the indigenous Bubi and invest in cocoa farming on the island.

== Cocoa trade ==
The cocoa tree itself was introduced to Sao Tome in 1822 and from there it reached Fernando Po in 1854; it was from Fernando Po that the crop spread to the Gold Coast and Nigeria. The British granted the first concessions around Clarence to 'original settlers' in the late 1820s." The Spaniards thought it politic to recognize existing property rights as long as there were signs that plots had been cultivated in some way. Of the land grants listed in 1891, 32 appear to have belonged to Creoles, judging by the names. Vivour was the Fernandino with the most land, 202 hectares in all

The combined effort of the Creole and the Spaniards so quickened the pace of agricultural development in Fernando Po that by 1909, the island was the tenth-largest producer of cocoa in the world. By the 1890s the presence of the Creoles in Fernando Po was so pervasive that a Catholic missionary complained that:

The island of Fernando Po above all, has been captured by the English blacks of Sierra Leone.... and this, the major part of the island is in the hands of the English blacks.

The significant fortune Vivour made in the palm oil business he invested heavily in cocoa farming.

On February 1, 1872, he loaned Reverend Roe his schooner to visit Clarence peak. By 1887, when he accompanied Catholic missionaries on their first trip to the western side of the island, Vivour had acquired several cocoa plantations. At the end of the 1880s, few agriculturalists were trading directly with the Manchester trading houses, among them Vivour. By the mid-1880s, he was the largest landowner on the island, and employed a massive labor force of men from diverse ethnic origins recruited from the Biafra and beyond. They were from Loango; the lower Guinea coast; Accra; and Grebo Kruboys (migrant laborers) from Cape Palmas and the Windward Coast. Vivour also recruited ethnic Bassa and ethnic Bubi. He employed artisans from Accra who served as coopers, carpenters and smiths.

His success in cocoa cultivation was so noteworthy that the following was remarked during the proceedings of the Royal Geographic Society in England.

Situated on the Bay of San Carlos is the flourishing cocoa plantation of W.A.Vivour, a Sierra Leone negro, which is of such importance that English steamers call there several times in the course of the year.

== Personal life ==
W. A. Vivour married Amelia Barleycorn, a member of one of the prominent Fernandino families. They had several children, one of which was Garnet Vivour, father to both RAF pilot Bankole Vivour and Justice R.W.A Rhodes-Vivour.

In relation to the complexities of making a living and settling on land that was in contention by both the British and Spanish, the British agreed to recognize only about one-tenth of the population of Clarence as British subjects on the eve of effective Spanish occupation in 1888, including a few Britons. The rest of the resident Creole population became Spanish by default." William Allen Vivour, a wealthy Creole planter born in Sierra Leone, greeted the Austrian explorer Oscar Baumann in Korth West Bay (San Carlos, Luba) in 1886 as the local representative of the Spanish crown.

As regards the spend thrift nature of his contemporaries, Baumann painted a very intimate picture of Vivour as one that was efficient and hated waste. Funds were borrowed for non-productive purposes by many traders, but suggestions that Africans were more likely to waste capital than Europeans are suspect.

Sundiata portrays profligacy as the major Creole weakness. He echoes Mary Kingsley's verdict that the Creoles spent 'most of their money in the giddy whirl of Santa Isabel, but this does not fit with Baumann's intimate and detailed portrait of Vivour as an archetypal miser, saving every penny.

In the 1910s, Spanish authors stressed the eminence of the Creoles, not their decline. Saavedra wrote in 1910 of the not inconsiderable number of well off Creoles in Fernando Po, who tended to dress better and with more style than the Europeans. He continued,

'A few families ... have considerable fortunes which allow them to visit the capital cities of Europe, especially London', and he singled out the Jones, Kinson, Vivour, Barleycorn, Balboa, Collins, Knox and Prince families for special mention. His evidence is backed up by Bravo Carbonel, writing seven years later, who noted admiringly the luxurious lifestyles of the leading Creoles, notably their consumption of the best champagne, cognac, and whisky.

Vivours notable descendants include, Retired Justice of the Supreme Court Olabode Rhodes-Vivour as well as the politician Chief Gbadebo Rhodes-Vivour.

== Death ==
In the 1890s, after Vivour's death, a visiting African-American noted that the opulence of his tomb bore testimony to his business success:

In the cemetery.... is a Monument erected to the memory of Mr. William Vivour. This monument is forty feet high and was brought from Liverpool at a cost of $600. At his death, his widow, Amelia Barleycorn Vivour, owned the largest cocoa plantation on the island – four hundred hectares in San Carlos.
