= Hannah Uzor =

British-Zambian painter

- Born: Hannah Hasiciimbwe; 1982 (age 43–44); Lusaka, Zambia
- Occupation: Painter

Hannah Uzor (born 1982) is a British-Zambian painter.

== Early life and education ==
Hannah Hasiciimbwe was born in Lusaka, Zambia. As an infant, she and her parents moved to England, returning to Zambia when she was two years old. She became interested in art at a young age, and began painting as a teenager. She returned to the U.K. to pursue a bachelor's degree in computer studies.

In 2019, Uzor began formal art studies at Kensington and Chelsea College. She earned her master's degree at the Slade School of Fine Art. She won the school's inaugural Milein Cosman Scholarship for Drawing in 2021.

== Career ==
Uzor is inspired by history, particularly Black diasporic history and figures. She works primarily with acrylics. She has cited Cézanne, Gauguin, Toulouse Lautrec, Kerry James Marshall, Yinka Shonibare, and Barbara Walker as influences.

Prior to working as an artist, Uzor worked in business development and digital marketing. She was inspired to work as a painter following her mother's death in 2016.

In October 2020, Uzor's portrait of Sarah Forbes Bonetta, a West African princess and a goddaughter of Queen Victoria, was exhibited by English Heritage at Osborne House on the Isle of Wight in honor of Black History Month. The portrait is based on a photo of Bonetta in her wedding dress.

In May 2024, Uzor was commissioned by Tatler to paint a portrait of Catherine, Princess of Wales for the cover of their July 2024 issue. Uzor was not able to have Catherine sit for the portrait, and instead used images available online as reference material. She completed the project in three weeks. When images of the portrait were released in May, some media outlets and social media users criticized the piece for not looking like Catherine.

== Personal life ==
Uzor met her husband, Peter, through her church.The couple have three children. She lives in St Albans, Hertfordshire.
