= William Broadbent Luddington =

William Broadbent Luddington (March 1843 – November 1888) was a Primitive Methodist missionary who went to the island of Fernando Po (today Bioko in Equatorial Guinea) in about 1880. His father was also a Primitive Methodist Minister.

== Background and Primitive Methodist ministry ==
He was born in Brampton, Lincolnshire in March 1843, and became a Primitive Methodist minister at Malton in Yorkshire in 1864. From 1873 until his death in 1888 Luddington divided his life between missionary work in Fernando Po, particularly among the Bubi people, missionary deputation work and ministerial work in England. He and his wife returned from their third term in Fernando Po in a very poor state of health.

== Bubi primer ==
Luddington compiled the first Bubi primer in 1875 along with co-missionary William Barleycorn. Two copies of Bubi na English primer compiled by William B. Luddington & William N. Barleycorn, 1875 are available for consultation in SOAS Library.
