= Kalabari Kingdom =

Kalabari Elem Kalabari
- Traditional state
- Kalabari Kingdom
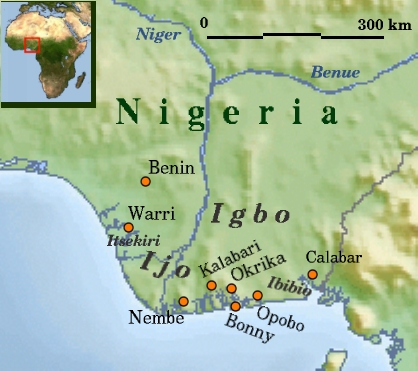
- Ijaw States, including Kalabari
- Coordinates: 4°34′6″N 6°58′34″E
- Country: Nigeria
- State: Rivers State
- Founder: King Amachree I
- Capital: Buguma

Government
  - Type: Traditional Monarchy
  - Body: Kalabari Royal Court (Council of Chiefs)
  - Amanayanabo: Chief (Dr.) C.I.T. Numbere (Regent)

Population
  - Estimate (2022): 558,000
- Time zone: UTC+1 (WAT)

The Kalabari Kingdom, also called Elem Kalabari (Kalabari: New Shipping Port), is the independent traditional state of the Kalabari people, a sub-group of the Ijaw tribe, eastern ijo, in the Niger River Delta. It is recognized as a traditional state in what is now Rivers State, in southern region of Nigeria.

The Kingdom was founded by the great Amachree I, forefather of the Amachree dynasty, which is now headed by the Princewill family.

According to Alagoa (1966) King Amachree I, the first king of modern Kalabari kingdom (1669–1757) came from Emakalakala in Ogbia.

King Amachree XI (Professor Theophilus Princewill CFR), passed on and was buried in November 2003. The Kingdom is currently being overseen by a Regent Chief (Dr.) C.I.T. Numbere, till a new king is crowned. Contemporary British-Nigerian novelist Victoria Princewill, a descendant of the Princewill family, has written about her Kalabari heritage and ancestral ties to the ruling structures of the region in her 2021 essay for Granta.

The King along with his Council of Chiefs, most of whom are royal princes, make up the Kalabari royal court.

== People and customs ==
According to one tradition, the Kalabari people originally came from Calabar (called "Old Calabar" by the Europeans), a site further to the east occupied by Efik people of Cross River State. This may have been a 19th-century invention. The Efik themselves say the name "Calabar" was given to their town by the Europeans. Other traditions say Kalabari was founded by Ijo settlers from Amafo, on the west bank of the New Calabar River, and that they were joined there by settlers from other communities.

The people occupied a series of islands among the mangrove swamps of the delta, where they engaged in fishing and trading. They would take the produce of the delta region up the New Calabar and Imo rivers, and exchange them for food and goods of the hinterland. In the 15th century, the early European traders noted that they alone of the delta people refused to trade on credit.

The people of Elem Kalabari originally worshipped the goddess Awoamenakaso (or Awamenakaso, Akaso), the mother of all the deities of the Kalabari clan, even when individual settlements had their own local gods and goddesses. She opposed war and bloodshed, and the Kalabari later claimed she was the sister of the British goddess Brittana, who ruled the seas. Among their neighbors, because of their "civilized" and generally peaceful behavior the Kalabari were called "Englishmen".

== History ==
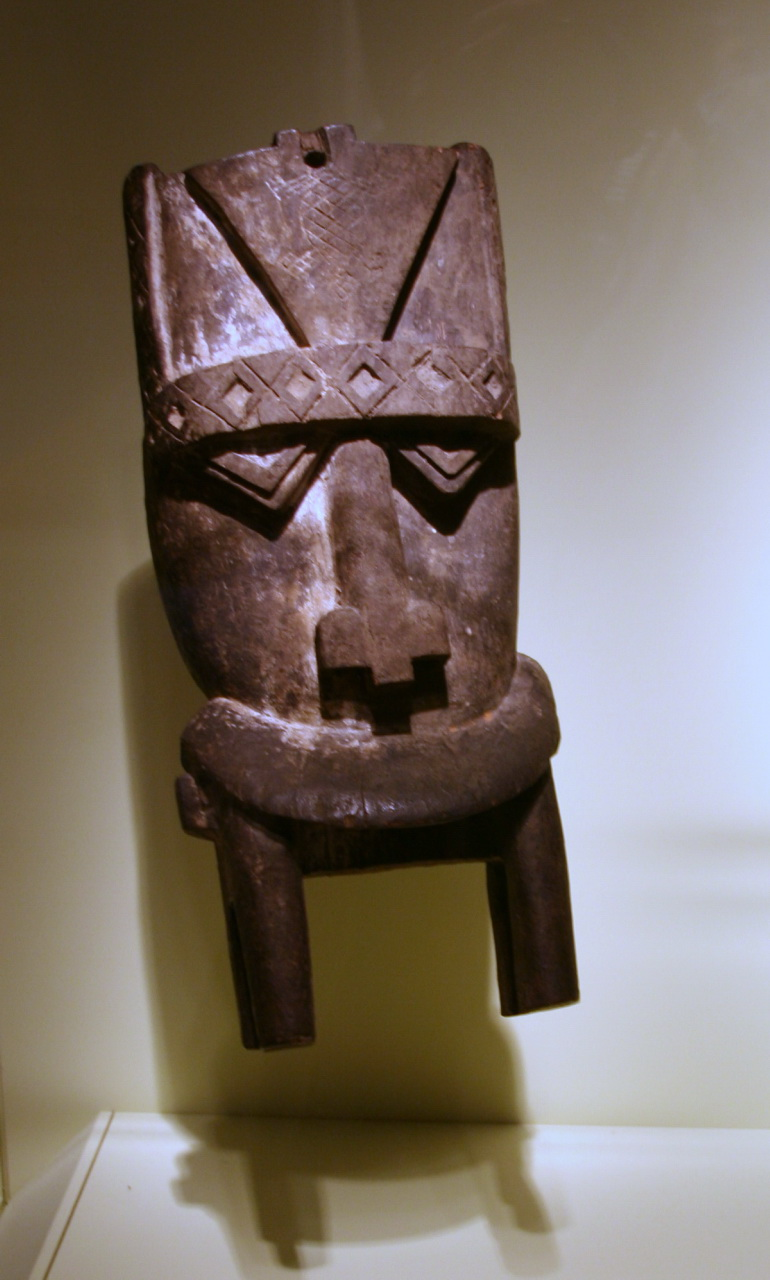
Mask, Kalabari Ijo peoples, Nigeria, Early 20th century, Wood, pigment (National Museum of African Art, Washington D.C.)

A ruler named King Owerri Daba was said to have brought the slave trade to Kalabari and Bonny, and to have founded the houses of Duke Monmouth and Duke Africa. This happened some time before 1699, since James Barbot records giving presents to Duke Monmouth of Kalabari in that year. Kalabari became an entrepôt of the Atlantic slave trade, mainly selling slaves purchased from Igboland, further to the north.

Amachree I, who died around 1800, was the founder of the dynasty that bears his name. Most of the major trading houses expanded during his reign. In the 19th century, the Kalabari Kingdom was in the center of a power struggle in the east of the delta. Elem Kalabari fought against the Nembe Kingdom to the west, the Kingdom of Bonny to the southeast and Okrika to the northeast. The main rival was Okrika, which had the potential to block Kalabari's access to the interior. The Kalabari brought their goods down to Elem Ifoko, at the mouth of the New Calabar river, but refused to go the seven more miles to Bonny for the convenience of the European traders. Trade involved the acquisition of slaves, ivory and palm oil, for which cotton clothing, hardware, guns and gunpowder were given in exchange. Salt, made by evaporation, was an important article of trade in the interior.

In July 1863, the feud with the Nembe people of Brass flared up, with the Nembe the decisive victors. By December 1865 the Okrika had started ambushing Kalabari trading canoes, and Bonny was threatening to join in since Kalabari was blocking their passage through Kalabari territory. The British consul had to intervene to prevent further hostilities. When Jubo Jubogha ("Ja-Ja") moved from Bonny in 1869 and established the separate state of Opobo, he became an ally of Kalabari. Bonny now began a more serious push into Kalabari territory to recover from loss of trade to Opobo. In 1873 a perpetual treaty of peace was signed between Kalabari and Bonny on the same day that a treaty was signed between two rival factions within Kalabari.

Neither of these treaties was observed. In July 1882 the British consul had to intervene again in the struggle with Bonny. From 1882 to 1884 two factions of the royal family continued to struggle for control. The Amachree faction succeeded, while the Barboy or Will Braide group moved to the new settlement of Bakana in 1881.

Soon after, the remaining faction, consisting mostly of the Amachree group, also evacuated Elem Kalabari, moving to Abonnema in 1882 and to Buguma in 1884, both further inland. The European traders followed them, now going up the Sombreiro River to Abonnema. The government of Kalabari had now become a council of powerful chiefs and royal princes headed and overseen by the King.

== Rulers ==
=== Independent state ===
Names and dates taken from John Stewart's African States and Rulers (1989).

Start	End	Ruler
c.1550	c.1575	Kalabari
c.1575	c.1590	Owoma
c.1590	c.1600	Opukoroye
c.1600	c.1620	Owerri Daba
c.1620	c.1655	Igbessa
c.1655	c.1680	Kamalo (King Robert)
c.1680	c.1720	Mangi Suku
c.1720	c.1726	Igonibaw
c.1726	c.1733	Ngbesa
c.1733	c.1740	Omuye
c.1740	c.1745	Bokoye
c.1745	c.1750	Daba
c.1750	c.1770	Kalagba
c.1770	c.1790	Amakiri (Amachree) I
c.1790	c.1835	Amakuru/Amakiri (Amachree) II
c.1835	April 1863	Karibo (Amakiri/Amachree III)
April 1863	c.1900	Abe (Amakiri/Amachree IV) (Abbe Prince Will)

=== Protectorate and Nigerian Federation ===
Rulers after the kingdom became part of the British protectorate, then the independent Federation of Nigeria:

Start	End	Ruler
1900	1918	Amachree V (Charlie Keini)
1919	1927	Amachree VI (Willie Keini)
1927	1960	Amachree VII (Obenibo J.T. Princewill)
1960	1973	Amachree VIII (Frederick Princewill) (b. 1906 – d. 1973)
1973	1975	Amachree IX (Cottone Keini)
1975	7 June 1998	Amachree X (Abbiye Suku) (d. 1998)
7 Jun 1998	2002	Vacant
2002	2021	Amachree XI (Theophilus J.T. Princewill) (b. 1930 – d. 2021)

== See also ==
- Prince Tonye Princewill
