= New Calabar River =

River in Nigeria

Coordinates: 4.498393°N 6.996231°E

The New Calabar River is a river in Rivers State, Nigeria, in the Niger River Delta. The Kalabari Kingdom was based on this river. The New Calabar River is one of the most stressed rivers in the Niger delta of Nigeria. It is presently not the focus of any systematic periodic water quality investigation. The river system exhibits temporal variation which could be attributed to the mixing process of the upper and lower reaches of the water under varying tropical climatic conditions. The water across the season exhibited variation in the increase and decrease in the physicochemical parameters. This could be attributed to industrial activities in and around the river and the discharge of domestic waste into the river, which are prevalent upstream of the river. Although series of work have been carried out in different reaches of the river.

== Pollution ==
Studies showed the New Calabar River had been polluted by some chemical substances like lead, cadmium and chromium contaminating the surface water. Residue from all locales showed low to extensive contamination by the heavy metals.

This has high effect on the locales health risk due to the fact that they consume the fishes harvested from the river.

The inorganic anion contamination of the Unused Calabar Waterway surface water was explored. Comes about appeared regular varieties within the inorganic anion levels. Water parameters such as sulphite, nitrate, phosphate, and alkalinity showed significantly higher values within the blustery season than within the dry season. Broken up oxygen, pH, sulphide, sulfate, alkali, and nitrite appeared no critical contrasts between their blustery and dry season levels. Upstream-downstream changes were shown by conductivity, add up to broken down solids, chloride, saltiness, and temperature. Exemptions happened within the nitrite levels, where the impact was negligible. In spite of the fact that the concentrations of a few anions analyzed fell inside universally satisfactory limits, the Unused Calabar Waterway water is, within the fundamental, contaminated with inorganic anions and may be unsatisfactory for consumable and mechanical employments without treatment.
