= James Pinson Labulo Davies =

Nigerian businessman (1828–1906)

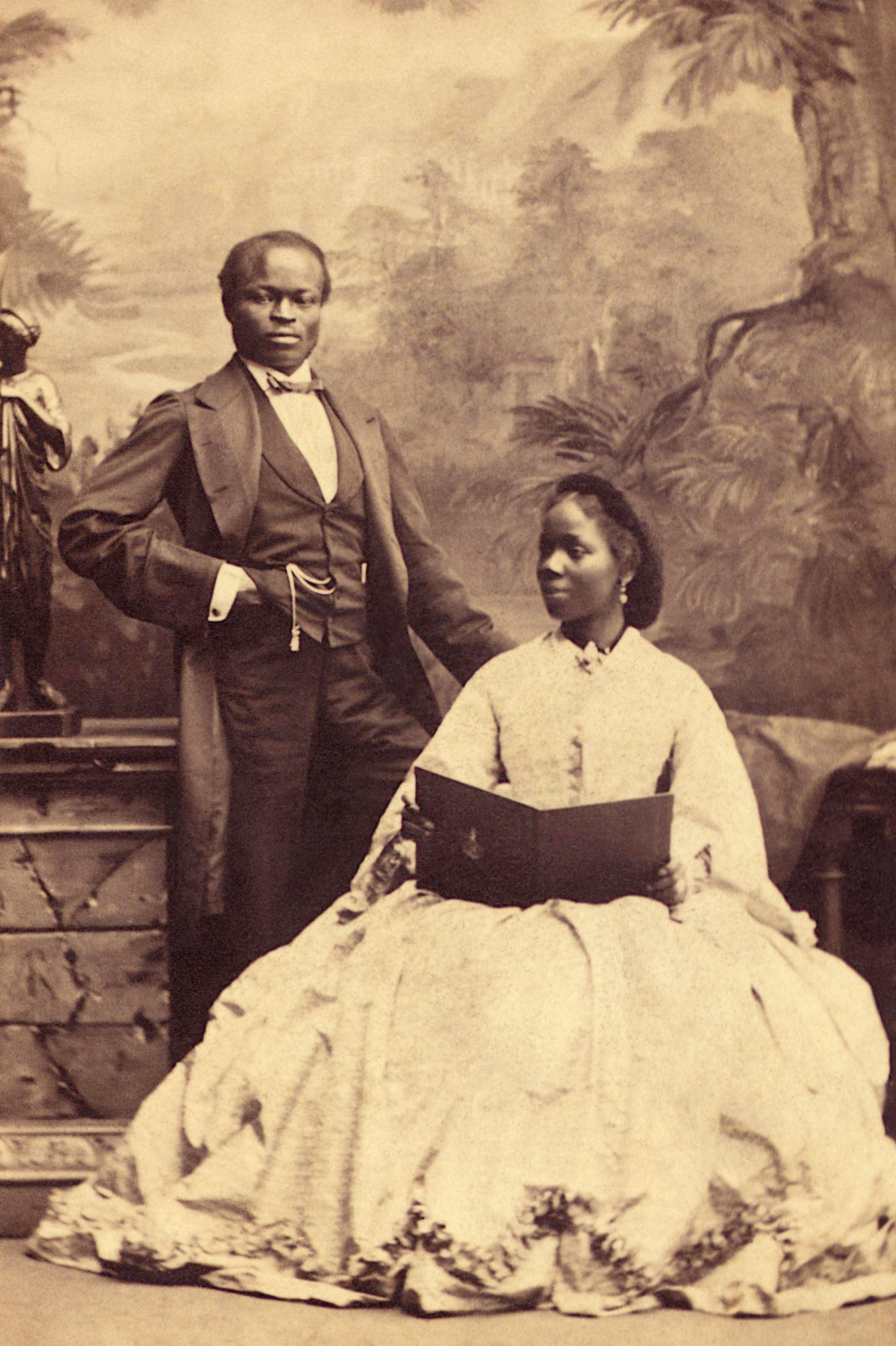
- A portrait of Davies and his wife Sarah Forbes Bonetta, photographed in London in 1862
- Born: 14 August 1828; Bathurst, British Sierra Leone
- Died: 29 April 1906 (aged 77); Lagos, Southern Nigeria Protectorate
- Resting place: Ajele Cemetery
- Education: Church Missionary Society Grammar School
- Occupations: British Naval officer, merchant, sailor, businessman, farmer and philanthropist.
- Years active: 1848–1906
- Employer: Royal Navy
- Known for: Financing CMS Grammar School, Lagos and pioneering cocoa farming in West Africa
- Spouses: Matilda Bonifacio Serrano (m. 1859; died 1860) Sarah Forbes Bonetta (m. 1862; died 1880) Catherine Kofoworola Reffle (m. 1889)
- Children: 3, including Victoria Davies
- Relatives: John Randle (son-in-law); Ameyo Adadevoh (great-great-granddaughter)

James Pinson Labulo Davies (14 August 1828 – 29 April 1906) was a Nigerian businessman, merchant-sailor, naval officer, farmer, pioneer industrialist, statesman, and philanthropist who married Sarah Forbes Bonetta in colonial Lagos.

== Early life, education, and naval career ==
James Pinson Labulo Davies was born to James and Charlotte Davies in the village of Bathurst, Sierra Leone, then a British colony. His parents were Creoles of recaptive Yoruba ancestry liberated by the British West Africa Squadron from the Atlantic Slave Trade, and whose origins were in Abeokuta and Ogbomoso respectively.

Davies entered the Church Missionary Society (CMS) Grammar School, (now known as Sierra Leone Grammar School), in Freetown in 1848, where he studied mathematics, Greek, biblical and English history, geography, music and Latin. After completing his secondary education, he became a teacher with the CMS in Freetown. After his stint as a teacher Davies enlisted as a cadet with the British Royal Navy's West Africa Squadron, and served on HMS Volcano under Commander Robert Coote where he was trained in navigation and seamanship. Davies progressed from cadet to midshipman and eventually lieutenant.

== Participation in the Lagos Bombardment of 1851 and merchant vessel career ==
Davies was a lieutenant aboard HMS Bloodhound during the Bombardment of Lagos under the command of Commander Wilmot and Commodore Henry William Bruce and in which Oba Kosoko was ousted, resulting in the ascension of Oba Akitoye. During the bombardment the British Navy lost two officers and ten men were wounded. Lieutenant Davies was among the wounded. Davies retired from the navy in 1852 and offered his services as a merchant vessel captain traversing the West African coast. He eventually settled in Lagos in 1856, where he became known as "Captain J.P.L Davies".

== Personal life and marriages ==
Davies was first married to Matilda Bonifacio Serrano, a Spanish lady from Havana, who died in 1860, nine months after their marriage. In August 1862, Davies married Sarah Forbes Bonetta, a protégée of Queen Victoria. Originally named Aina (also Ina), she was enslaved following the raiding of her village in Okeadan and the death of her parents at the hands of Dahomean warriors, subsequently kept in King Ghezo of Dahomey's court. She was liberated by Captain Forbes of the Bonetta after a meeting with Ghezo. They had three children: Victoria Davies (1863), Arthur Davies (1871), and Stella Davies (1873). Sarah died of tuberculosis in 1880, and Davies married Catherine Kofoworola Reffle in 1889.

== Cocoa farming pioneer in West Africa ==
Davies is credited with pioneering cocoa farming in west Africa after obtaining the cocoa seeds from a Brazilian ship and also from the island of Fernando Po in 1879 and 1880. Davies subsequently established a prosperous cocoa farm in Ijon, Western Lagos. Davies also helped spread cocoa farming knowledge to Jacob Kehinde Coker, who used the proceeds from his cocoa farm to support Christian evangelical interests. J.K Coker also headed the Agege Planters Union, which spread the cocoa throughout Yoruba territory. In April 1916, the Journal of African Society credited a native of Accra with introducing cocoa to mainland West Africa. However, Justice W.B. Griffiths, colonial Chief Justice of Gold Coast (present day Ghana), issued a rebuttal in the 20 June 1916 edition, crediting his father, Sir Brandford Griffiths, the British governor of Gold Coast from 1885 to 1895, with pioneering cocoa farming in Gold Coast. Justice Griffith acknowledged that Davies predated his father as the cocoa pioneer in West Africa. He wrote:

As far as I'm aware, the first person to plant cocoa on the main-land was the late Capt. J.P.L. Davies, a well known native of Lagos, who in 1882 used to tell me about the farm he had lately just made beyond the Protectorate of Lagos.

== Philanthropy and establishment of CMS Grammar School ==
Davies was also a close associate and friend of Bishop Samuel Ajayi Crowther. Both men collaborated on a couple of Lagos social initiatives such as the opening of The Academy (a social and cultural center for public enlightenment) on 24 October 1866 with Bishop Crowther as the first patron and Davies as its first president.

In April 1859, Davies provided Reverend Thomas Babington Macaulay with the seed funding to establish the CMS Grammar School, Lagos: £50 (purchasing power of ₦1.34 million as of 2014) to buy books and equipment. With the seed funds, Macaulay opened CMS Grammar School on 6 June 1859.

In 1867, Davies contributed another £100 (purchasing power of ₦2.68 million as of 2014) toward a CMS Grammar School Building Fund. Other contributors to the CMS building fund were non-Saros such as Taiwo Olowo, who contributed £50. Saro contributors also included men such as Moses Johnson, I.H. Willoughby, T.F. Cole, James George, and Charles Foresythe who contributed £40.

== Death ==
Captain Davies died at his Lagos home on 29 August 1906 and was buried at Ajele Cemetery in Lagos on 30 August 1906.

== See also ==
- Nigerian bourgeoisie, the class that Davies belonged to
- Nigerian aristocracy, the class that Davies married into
- Black British elite, the class that Davies married into
