= Napoleon Barleycorn =

Napoleon Barleycorn was a Primitive Methodist missionary in Spanish Guinea, a Krio Fernandino of Igbo descent, who sent his sons to be educated at Bourne College in Quinton, England. One of his sons was William Napoleon Barleycorn, the well-known writer of the first Bube language primer.

== See also ==
- Edward Barleycorn
- Edward Thaddeus Barleycorn Barber
