= Oludamola Adebowale =

Nigerian archivist, historian and curator

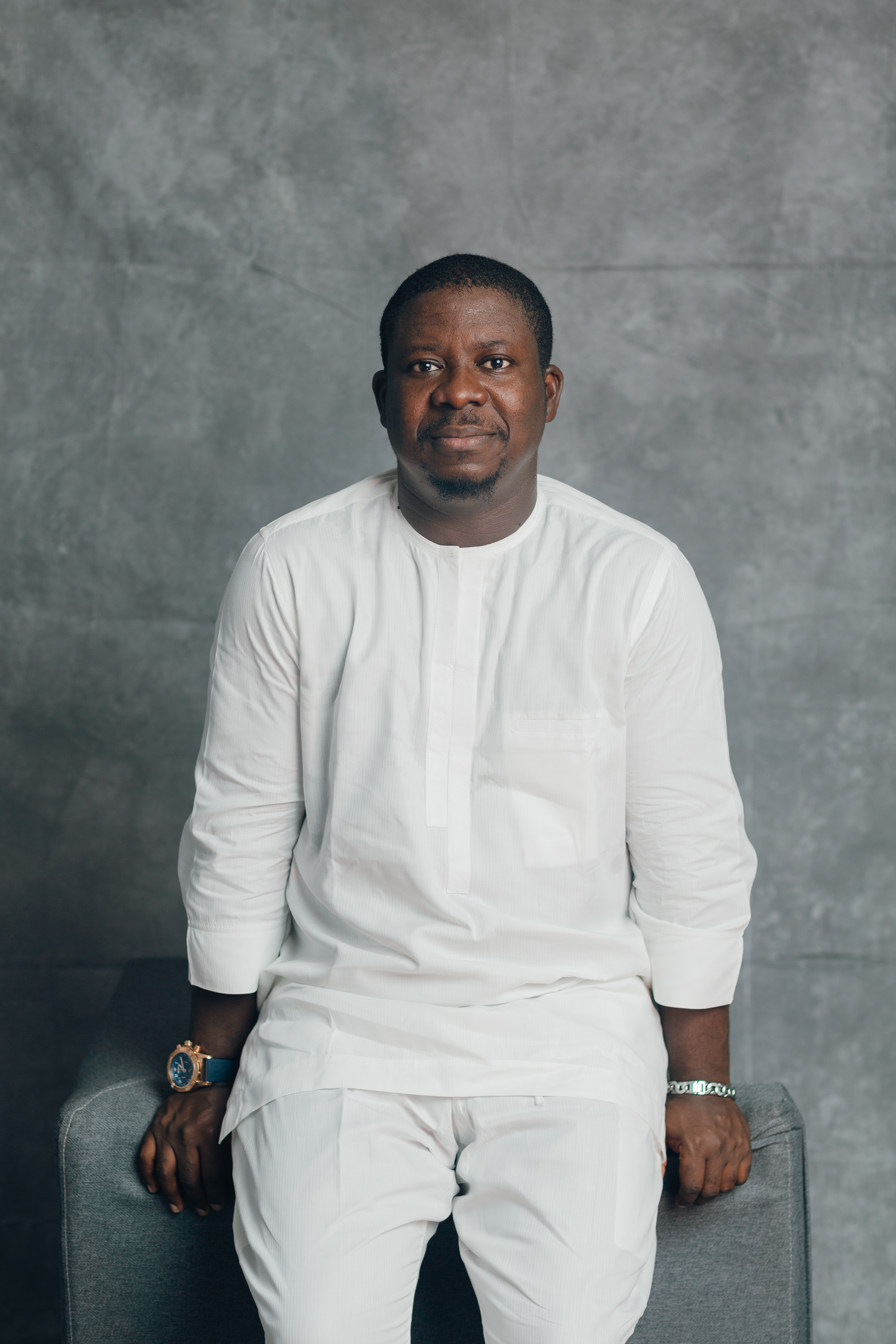
- Born: Lagos, Nigeria
- Education: Obafemi Awolowo University, Ile-Ife
- Occupations: Curator, Archivist, Researcher, Historian
- Website: oludamolaadebowale.com

Oludàmọ́lá Adébọ̀wálé is a Nigerian archivist, public historian, writer, curator and cultural heritage specialist whose work focuses on the preservation, documentation, and promotion of African history and cultural memory. He is a fellow of the Royal Society of Arts (RSA), United Kingdom; an associate fellow of the Royal Historical Society; and a member of the International Council on Archives.

== Early life and education ==
Adebowale studied Estate Management at Obafemi Awolowo University, Ile-Ife (2008), Integrated Branding and Copywriting at Orange Academy (2009), and Business and Marketing Development at the Lagos Entrepreneurial Business School (2011). He further specialized in Copyright and Intellectual Property Law at the Institute of Advanced Legal Studies, and completed the CopyrightX Program of Harvard Law School.

== Career ==
Before fully dedicating himself to heritage preservation and public history, Adebowale served as Nigeria Country Manager for Instant Grass International, a trend forecasting and consumer insight development company based in Cape Town, South Africa, where he worked for five years. Adebowale later focused his professional work on archival preservation, public history, cultural heritage, research, and curation.

=== ASIRI magazine and archival work ===
In 2013, Adebowale founded ASIRI Magazine, initially conceived as a digital illustration magazine for educating Nigerians and members of the diaspora about Nigerian history. The magazine began with illustrated historical accounts, producing eight editions covering subjects including Jaja of Opobo, Madam Tinubu, Queen Idia and the history of the walls of Kano. Adebowale conducted historical research for the editions, which were distributed digitally and translated into several languages, including French, Spanish, Italian, German and Portuguese. In a 2023 interview, he stated that the original editions had received more than 17,000 downloads about a decade earlier.

ASIRI subsequently developed into a digital repository and platform for historical documentation, archival images, research, cultural heritage and public history. The Guardian described it in 2021 as a major digital repository of Nigerian history, arts and culture, while reporting that its activities had expanded beyond publications to include historical research, archival preservation, public events and other forms of cultural engagement. In 2026, The Guardian reported that ASIRI had grown into one of the larger digital archives of rare historical images and narratives in Nigeria.

In 2026, ASIRI launched HerStory of Nigeria: Women, Power and Protest in Lagos (1910–1950), a historical documentation and public-engagement initiative focused on the contributions of Nigerian women to the country's political, economic and social development. The project, launched in partnership with the British Deputy High Commission, combines historical research, school engagements and the development of a digital archive containing photographs, documents, oral histories and biographies of Nigerian women. The initiative subsequently expanded through school programmes designed to introduce students to women whose contributions have received limited attention in conventional historical narratives.

=== Nigerian-Brazilian public history project ===
In December 2020, Adebowale was appointed Senior Curator of the Nigerian-Brazilian Public History Project, an initiative established to document and recover the contributions of Afro-Brazilians and their descendants to Nigerian society. The project focuses on the social, cultural, religious, economic, and political histories of Afro-Brazilian communities in Nigeria from the nineteenth century onward, including their influence on urban development, religion, and civic life.

In his role, Adebowale has worked on historical research, documentation, and the development of materials relating to Nigeria–Brazil connections, including the preservation of documents, interviews, and archival records. The initiative is also described as part of broader efforts to compile oral histories and archival material on Afro-Brazilian returnee communities, particularly in Lagos and other coastal areas where they historically settled.

=== Public history and cultural heritage work ===
Adebowale's work spans archival preservation, historical research, cultural documentation, public history, and heritage interpretation.

He was among the Nigerians selected by the Horniman Museum and Gardens in the United Kingdom to contribute to the #ThenAndNow: Nigeria at 60 project, a collaboration between the museum and Nigerian creatives and researchers marking the 60th anniversary of Nigeria's independence. Adebowale contributed an essay examining migration between Nigeria and the United Kingdom and reflections on the country's historical experience.

Adebowale was also one of the Nigerian experts involved in the selection of the 16 òrìṣas featured in Who's Who in the Yorùbá Pantheon, a publication produced by Iwalewa Books in cooperation with the Goethe-Institut Nigeria. The publication explores the spiritual and cultural significance of 16 Yoruba òrìṣas and was intended primarily for young Nigerian and international readers. Other Nigerian experts involved included Prof. Wale Adeniran, Chief Priest Ifayemi Elebuibon, Oloye Muraina Oyelami, Emma Uduma, and Yinka Akanbi.

On 19 October 2024, Adebowale was awarded an Honorary Doctorate in Philosophy Honoris Causa in the field of Public Administration and an Integrity Fellow Humanitarian Award from Anointed University, South Africa, for his contributions to Nigerian culture and the arts.

== Curatorial projects and exhibitions ==
As a curator and heritage professional, Adebowale has conceived, curated, and produced numerous exhibitions, including:

- Colours of Our History: 1851 Bombardment of Lagos (2018)
- Ogun State African Drum Festival Exhibition (2019)
- Chief Ebenezer Obey Museum Booth, Federal College of Education, Osiele, Abeokuta (2019)
- Wole Soyinka at 86: WSICE Birthday Exhibition (2019)
- Timeless Memories: Elastic Effects of Wole Soyinka (2019–2026)
- British Council 75th Anniversary Virtual Exhibition (2020)
- Cycles of Fashion — Terra Kulture and Federal Ministry of Information and Culture Project (2020)
- Vintage Nigeria Digital Campaign in collaboration with the Rockefeller Archive Center and Ford Foundation (2020)
- Moses Majekodunmi Archive Exhibition, Lagos Polo Club (2023)
- Sijuwade Memorial Exhibition and Celebration (2025)
- In the Beginning there was Cloth (2025)

=== Participating exhibitions ===
As an artist, researcher, and archivist, Adebowale has participated in exhibitions including:

- Lagos: Ownership and Identities — Institute of African and Diaspora Studies, University of Lagos, and Universität Bayreuth (2020)

=== Archive digitization and preservation ===
Adebowale has led and supported archival preservation and digitization initiatives, including:

- Digitization of the Archive of Dr. Chief Moses Adekoyejo Majekodunmi (2022)
- Chief Dr. Ebenezer Obey-Fabiyi Museum Booth Project, Federal College of Education, Osiele, Abeokuta (2019)

== History and technology ==
In 2021, Adebowale developed 1851 Agidingbi Chess, a history-themed chess variant based on the 1851 Bombardment of Lagos. The game was conceived as a means of using technology and game design to engage younger audiences with Nigerian history. It features chess pieces named after historical figures and institutions associated with Lagos, including Erelu-Kuti of Lagos, the Oba of Lagos, Adamu Eyo, Omo Ogun Eko, Eletu-Odibo and Abagbon.

The game was produced in both digital and physical board-game formats. The app version was released in May 2022 and was available on iOS and Android, while the physical version was developed as a commemorative and collector's edition.

== FIlm and media Contributions ==
As a researcher and archivist, Adebowale has contributed research and archival expertise to film productions. He served as lead researcher for Funmilayo, a biographical film about Nigerian political activist Funmilayo Ransome-Kuti, and The Man Died, a film based on the life and work of Nigerian writer and Nobel laureate Wole Soyinka.

His work on The Man Died also extended to the historical and archival interpretation of Soyinka's work. In 2024, Adebowale curated The Man Who Didn't Die in the Face of Tyranny, the seventh edition of his Timeless Memories: Elastic Effects of Wole Soyinka exhibition, which explored Soyinka's life and work through materials related to The Man Died.

In October 2025, Adebowale was featured on CNN's African Voices: Changemakers, where journalist Larry Madowo profiled his work in preserving Nigerian cultural heritage. The programme described Adebowale as a historian and researcher who uses digital media and technology to promote, preserve, and document Nigerian history and noted his work consulting on films.

== Publications ==
Adebowale is the author of The Fabric of a Nation: Essays on Nigeria's History, Arts and Culture, a collection of essays and scholarly reflections examining Nigerian history, heritage, identity, arts, and cultural development.

Adebowale was also the Nigerian project curator and producer of Timeless Memories: Conversations between Wole Soyinka and Ulli Beier, a publication that emerged from the Timeless Memories Project, a collaboration involving the University of Limpopo, the University of Zululand, South Africa's Department of Sports, Arts and Culture, and Adebowale. The book, edited by Olufemi Abodunrin and Mogomme Masoga, presents conversations between Nigerian writer Wole Soyinka and German-born scholar Ulli Beier on Yoruba culture, religion, literature and indigenous knowledge.

== Professional memberships ==
- Fellow, Royal Society of Arts (RSA), United Kingdom
- Associate Fellow, Royal Historical Society (UK)
- Member, International Council on Archives (ICA)
- Executive Committee Member, ICA Section on Literary Archives (2025–2029)
