= William Barleycorn =

Spanish Guinean missionary

William N. Barleycorn
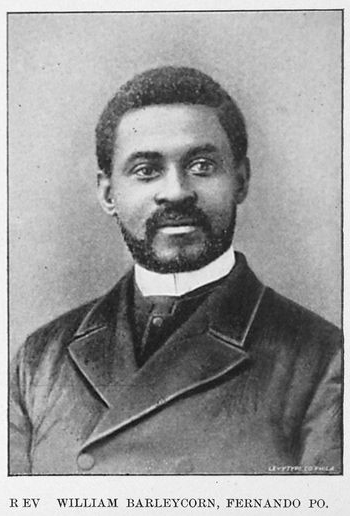
- Born: 1848; Santa Isabel, Fernando Po, Spanish Guinea
- Died: 1925 (aged 76–77)
- Occupations: Ordained Missionary, Author, Interpreter, Schoolmaster, Native Assistant Minister
- Writing career
- Period: late 19th - early 20th century

William Napoleon Barleycorn (1848–1925), born in Santa Isabel, Fernando Po, Spanish Guinea and a Krio Fernandino of Igbo descent, was a Primitive Methodist missionary who went to Fernando Po (now known as Bioko) in Africa in the early 1880s. From there, he travelled to Edinburgh University.

== Early life ==
He was the son of Napoleon Barleycorn, also a Primitive Methodist missionary in Fernando Po, who sent his sons to be educated at Bourne College in Quinton, England. He, additionally, studied in Barcelona, Spain and Victoria, Cameroon.

== Missionary work ==
During the early 1870s, William Barleycorn was a Sunday school teacher, a member of the Native Missionary Class, and a preacher at the local Bubi village of Basupu. In 1871 he abandoned running a small trading store and moved to San Carlos (North-West Bay) to work as an assistant for a European missionary. In 1873 he became the head of the Primitive Methodist Day School in San Carlos. Barleycorn made several trips to England, and received by the conference in Hull to serve as probationer in 1881.

== Studying in Barcelona ==
In 1884 he became listed as one of the regular ministers, and studied in Barcelona for two years to obtain his Spanish teaching certificate. He became the visible leader of Santa Isabel's Fernandino community by the 1890s, and served as a patriarchal remnant of the Anglophone and Protestant influence on the island.

In his honour, a 40-foot-high (12 m), $300 monument was erected in a Protestant cemetery near the Krio settlement Clarence Cove.

== Bubi primer ==
Barleycorn compiled the first Bube primer in 1875 along with co-missionary William B. Luddington.

Two copies of the Bubi na English primer compiled by William B. Luddington and William N. Barleycorn (1875) are available for consultation in SOAS Library.

== See also ==
- Edward Barleycorn
- Edward Thaddeus Barleycorn Barber
- Gertrude Johnson Barleycorn
- Napoleon Barleycorn
- Jeremiah (Jeremias) Barleycorn
