= Edward Barleycorn =

Fernandino planter and community figure in Spanish Guinea

Edward Emilio Barleycorn (1891–1978) was a member of one of the prominent Fernandino families of Spanish Guinea (today Equatorial Guinea). Active in Santa Isabel on Fernando Póo (now Bioko), he belonged to the cohort of African cocoa producers affiliated with the Fernandino planter community documented by historians of the island's agro-economy. In 1928, at the age of 39, he negotiated a labor contract between African farmers of Santa Isabel and the Spanish leaders of Fernando Po (Bioko).

He farmed his father's lands in places like Achepepe and Bantabare, employing relatives like his godmother and aunt Amelia Vivour.
