= Big Jubilee Read =

List of 70 books

Logo

The Big Jubilee Read is a 2022 campaign to promote reading for pleasure and to celebrate the Platinum Jubilee of Elizabeth II. A list of 70 books by Commonwealth authors, 10 from each decade of Elizabeth II's reign, was selected by a panel of experts and announced by the BBC and The Reading Agency on 18 April 2022.

== Selection process ==
An initial long-list was compiled from readers' suggestions, and a panel of librarians, booksellers and "literature specialists" made the choice of 70 titles, aiming "to engage all readers in the discovery and celebration of great books". The project received funding from the Arts Council and is supported by Libraries Connected and the Booksellers Association.

The organisers hope that the project will "celebrate the joy of reading and the power that it has to connect people across the country and among nations". Nineteen of the books are winners of the Booker Prize.

Most of the books are novels written in English, but there are also poetry collections such as Death of a Naturalist and short story collections including The Boat, while One Moonlit Night was published in Welsh as Un Nos Ola Leuad; Le Procès-Verbal and Our Lady of the Nile were originally in French; and Shuggie Bain is in English but has dialogue in Scots.

== The list ==
The list was published by the BBC on 18 April 2022.

Title	Author	Year	Country (as stated in official list)
The Palm-Wine Drinkard	Amos Tutuola	1952	Nigeria
The Hills Were Joyful Together	Roger Mais	1953	Jamaica
In the Castle of My Skin	George Lamming	1953	Barbados
My Bones and My Flute	Edgar Mittelholzer	1955	Guyana
The Lonely Londoners	Sam Selvon	1956	Trinidad and Tobago; England
The Guide	R. K. Narayan	1958	India
To Sir, With Love	E. R. Braithwaite	1959	Guyana
One Moonlit Night	Caradog Prichard	1961	Wales
A House for Mr Biswas	V. S. Naipaul	1961	Trinidad and Tobago; England
Sunlight on a Broken Column	Attia Hosain	1961	India
A Clockwork Orange	Anthony Burgess	1962	England
The Interrogation	J. M. G. Le Clézio	1963	France; Mauritius
The Girls of Slender Means	Muriel Spark	1963	Scotland
Arrow of God	Chinua Achebe	1964	Nigeria
Death of a Naturalist	Seamus Heaney	1966	Northern Ireland
Wide Sargasso Sea	Jean Rhys	1966	Dominica; Wales
A Grain of Wheat	Ngũgĩ wa Thiong'o	1967	Kenya
Picnic at Hanging Rock	Joan Lindsay	1967	Australia
The Beautyful Ones Are Not Yet Born	Ayi Kwei Armah	1968	Ghana
When Rain Clouds Gather	Bessie Head	1968	Botswana; South Africa
The Nowhere Man	Kamala Markandaya	1972	India
Tinker Tailor Soldier Spy	John Le Carré	1974	England
The Thorn Birds	Colleen McCullough	1977	Australia
The Crow Eaters	Bapsi Sidhwa	1978	Pakistan
The Sea, the Sea	Iris Murdoch	1978	England
Who Do You Think You Are?	Alice Munro	1978	Canada
The Hitchhiker's Guide to the Galaxy	Douglas Adams	1979	England
Tsotsi	Athol Fugard	1980	South Africa
Clear Light of Day	Anita Desai	1980	India
Midnight's Children	Salman Rushdie	1981	England; India
Schindler's Ark	Thomas Keneally	1982	Australia
Beka Lamb	Zee Edgell	1982	Belize
The Bone People	Keri Hulme	1984	New Zealand
The Handmaid's Tale	Margaret Atwood	1985	Canada
Summer Lightning	Olive Senior	1986	Jamaica
The Whale Rider	Witi Ihimaera	1987	New Zealand
The Remains of the Day	Kazuo Ishiguro	1989	England
Omeros	Derek Walcott	1990	Saint Lucia
The Adoption Papers	Jackie Kay	1991	Scotland
Cloudstreet	Tim Winton	1991	Australia
The English Patient	Michael Ondaatje	1992	Canada; Sri Lanka
The Stone Diaries	Carol Shields	1993	Canada
Paradise	Abdulrazak Gurnah	1994	Tanzania; England
A Fine Balance	Rohinton Mistry	1995	India; Canada
Salt	Earl Lovelace	1996	Trinidad and Tobago
The God of Small Things	Arundhati Roy	1997	India
The Blue Bedspread	Raj Kamal Jha	1999	India
Disgrace	J. M. Coetzee	1999	South Africa; Australia
White Teeth	Zadie Smith	2000	England
Life of Pi	Yann Martel	2001	Canada
Small Island	Andrea Levy	2004	England
The Secret River	Kate Grenville	2005	Australia
The Book Thief	Markus Zusak	2005	Australia
Half of a Yellow Sun	Chimamanda Ngozi Adichie	2006	Nigeria
A Golden Age	Tahmima Anam	2007	Bangladesh
The Boat	Nam Le	2008	Australia
Wolf Hall	Hilary Mantel	2009	England
The Book of Night Women	Marlon James	2009	Jamaica
The Memory of Love	Aminatta Forna	2010	Sierra Leone; Scotland
Chinaman	Shehan Karunatilaka	2010	Sri Lanka
Our Lady of the Nile	Scholastique Mukasonga	2012	Rwanda
The Luminaries	Eleanor Catton	2013	New Zealand
Behold the Dreamers	Imbolo Mbue	2016	Cameroon
The Bone Readers	Jacob Ross	2016	Grenada
How We Disappeared	Jing-Jing Lee	2019	Singapore
Girl, Woman, Other	Bernardine Evaristo	2019	England
The Night Tiger	Yangsze Choo	2019	Malaysia
Shuggie Bain	Douglas Stuart	2020	Scotland
A Passage North	Anuk Arudpragasam	2021	Sri Lanka
The Promise	Damon Galgut	2021	South Africa

=== Commonwealth nations by number of books ===
Where an author is given two countries of origin in the above list, 0.5 is given to each country.

Country	Books	Population (millions, 2022)
England	11	68
Australia	7.5	26
India	7	1,417
Canada	5	39
Scotland	3.5	5.5
Jamaica	3	3.0
New Zealand	3	5.1
Nigeria	3	218
Sri Lanka	2.5	22
Guyana	2	0.8
Trinidad and Tobago	2	1.4
Wales	1.5	3.2
Grenada	1	0.1
Saint Lucia	1	0.2
Barbados	1	0.3
Belize	1	0.4
Northern Ireland	1	1.9
Singapore	1	5.6
Rwanda	1	14
Cameroon	1	28
Malaysia	1	33
Kenya	1	57
Bangladesh	1	169
Pakistan	1	231
Dominica	0.5	0.1
Mauritius	0.5	1.3
Botswana	0.5	2.3
Sierra Leone	0.5	8.4
Ghana	0.5	33
Tanzania	0.5	64
France (Note: Not a Commonwealth nation.)	0.5	66

== Omissions and other issues ==
Commentators discussed several omissions of potential titles: J. R. R. Tolkien's The Lord of the Rings (ranked number 1 in the 2003 The Big Read); J. K. Rowling's Harry Potter books; Terry Pratchett's Discworld series; Philip Pullman's His Dark Materials trilogy, Doris Lessing's The Golden Notebook; and the work of Dick Francis, reportedly one of the Queen's favourite authors. The inclusion of Northern Irish writer Seamus Heaney was explained by the fact that when he wrote Death of a Naturalist he was living in the UK and published by an English publisher; Heaney identified as an Irish nationalist and had previously objected to his inclusion in The Penguin Book of Contemporary British Poetry.

In The Telegraph, Allison Pearson called it a "'You'll take your medicine and like it' kind of list compiled by people who were scared stiff of not being diverse enough." Similarly, in The Article, David Herman complained: "If you like Hornblower or James Bond, witches and hobbits, great children's literature, popular poetry or drama, The Big Jubilee Read doesn't care. What it does care about is post-colonial, ideally non-white, literature."
