= Pilgrims' Way (disambiguation) =

Pilgrims' Way (or Pilgrim's Way) may refer to:

- Pilgrims' Way, an ancient trackway in southern England
- Pilgrims Way (novel), a 1988 novel by Abdulrazak Gurnah
- North Wales Pilgrim's Way, a long-distance walking route ending at Bardsey Island
- Pilgrims' Way, the ancient pedestrian route across tidal sands to Lindisfarne in north east England
- Pilgrim's Way, the US title of John Buchan's autobiography Memory Hold-the-Door
- Pilgrims' Way (band), an English folk band
- A Pilgrim's Way, the poem by Rudyard Kipling

== See also ==
- Pilgrims' way
