= 2021 Nobel Prize in Literature =

- Abdulrazak Gurnah
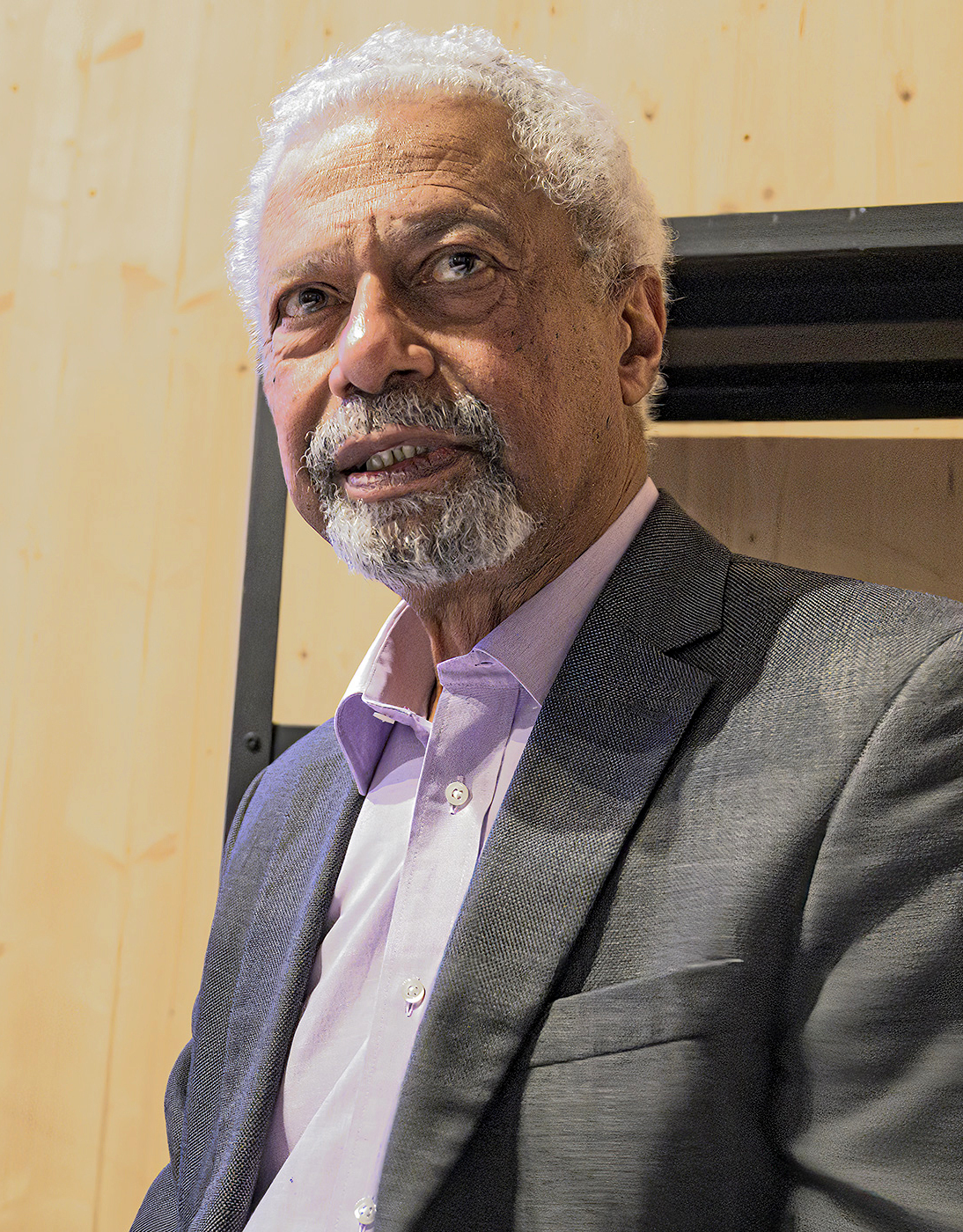
- "for his uncompromising and compassionate penetration of the effects of colonialism and the fate of the refugee in the gulf between cultures and continents."
- Date: 7 October 2021 (announcement); 10 December 2021 (ceremony)
- Location: Stockholm, Sweden
- Presented by: Swedish Academy
- First award: 1901
- Website: Official website

The 2021 Nobel Prize in Literature was awarded to the Tanzanian-born British novelist Abdulrazak Gurnah (born 1948) who the Swedish Academy members praised "for his uncompromising and compassionate penetration of the effects of colonialism and the fate of the refugee in the gulf between cultures and continents." The winner was announced on October 7, 2021, by Mats Malm, permanent secretary of the Swedish Academy.

He is the second black African writer to win the prize since 1986 laureate Wole Soyinka, and the 4th black writer since 1993 laureate Toni Morrison. He also is the 13th British writer and the 6th writer from Africa (including Doris Lessing, from Zimbabwe) to become a Nobel laureate in Literature.

== Laureate ==
Gurnah was born to a Muslim family of Yemeni descent in the Sultanate of Zanzibar (present-day Tanzania). During his teenage years, a coup in 1964 overthrew the Arab rulers on the island that led to a political upheaval and the persecution of Arab citizens in the following years. To escape the dangers, he left his country at the age of 18, becoming a refugee in England, arriving in 1968. There he obtained British citizenship and became professor of English and postcolonial literature. He authored a number of novels which includes Paradise (1994), By the Sea (2001), Desertion (2005), and Afterlives (2020), all of which depict a culturally diversified East Africa specifically highlighting the refugee's disruption and plight in immigration and during colonization.

== Pre-announcement speculations ==
According to Nicer Odds, who compile odds from various betting sites, favourite to win the 2021 Nobel Prize in Literature were Romanian author Mircea Cărtărescu, followed by Japanese Haruki Murakami, Russian Lyudmila Ulitskaya, Canadian Anne Carson (awarded in 2026), Kenyan Ngũgĩ wa Thiong'o, French Annie Ernaux (awarded in 2022), Canadian Margaret Atwood, Guadeloupe Maryse Condé, Hungarians László Krasznahorkai (awarded in 2025) and Péter Nádas, Antiguan Jamaica Kincaid, Americans Don De Lillo and Joyce Carol Oates, and Chinese Can Xue.

== Reactions ==
=== Personal reactions ===
Interviewed by Adam Smith, Chief Scientific Officer of Nobel Prize Outreach, Gurnah confided that he initially "thought it was a prank". Saying further: "because, you know, these things are usually floated for weeks beforehand, or sometimes months beforehand, about who will the, you know, who are the runners as it were, so it’s not something that was in my mind at all. I was just thinking 'I wonder who'll get it'." Asked how does he see the divisions between cultures and the current refugee crisis based on the prize's citation, he responded:

"I don’t see that these divisions are either, you know, permanent or somehow insurmountable or anything like that. People, of course, have been moving all over the world. I think this is a… this phenomenon of particularly people from Africa coming to Europe is a relatively new one, but of course the other... Europeans streaming out into the world is nothing new. Centuries of that we've had. So I think the reason it's so difficult for Europe to kind of, for a lot of people in Europe, for European states, to come to terms with it is perhaps a sort of... well, to cut a long story short, a kind of miserliness, as if there isn't enough to go around. When many of these people who come, come out of first need, and because quite frankly they have something to give. They don't... they don’t come empty handed. A lot of them are talented, energetic people, who have something to give. So that might be another way of thinking about it. You're not just taking people in as if they're, you know, poverty-stricken nothings, but, yeah, think of it as you're first providing succour to people who are in need, but also people who can contribute something."

=== International reactions ===
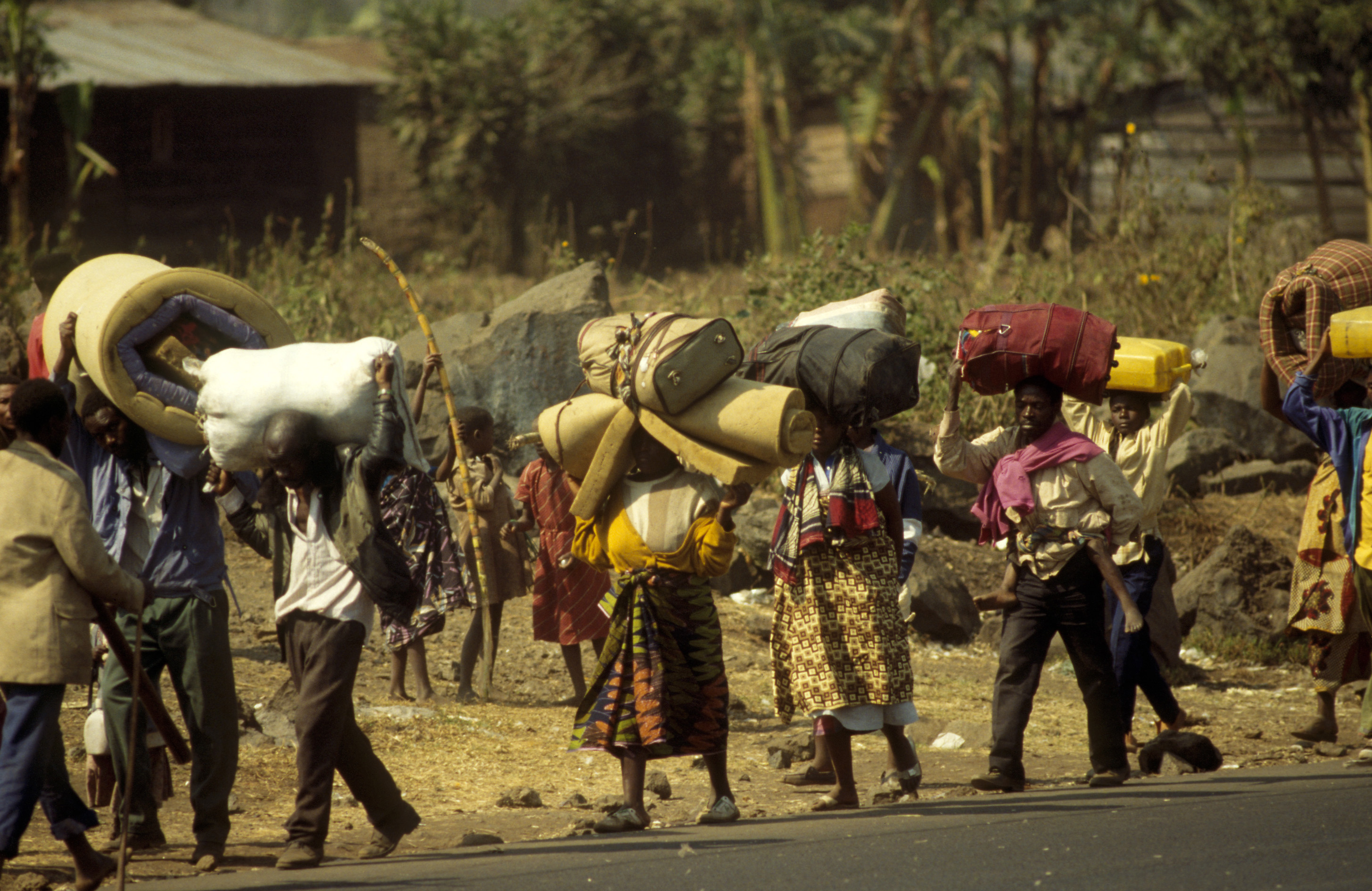
One of Gurnah's recurring themes in his novels is the plight and fate of African refugees.

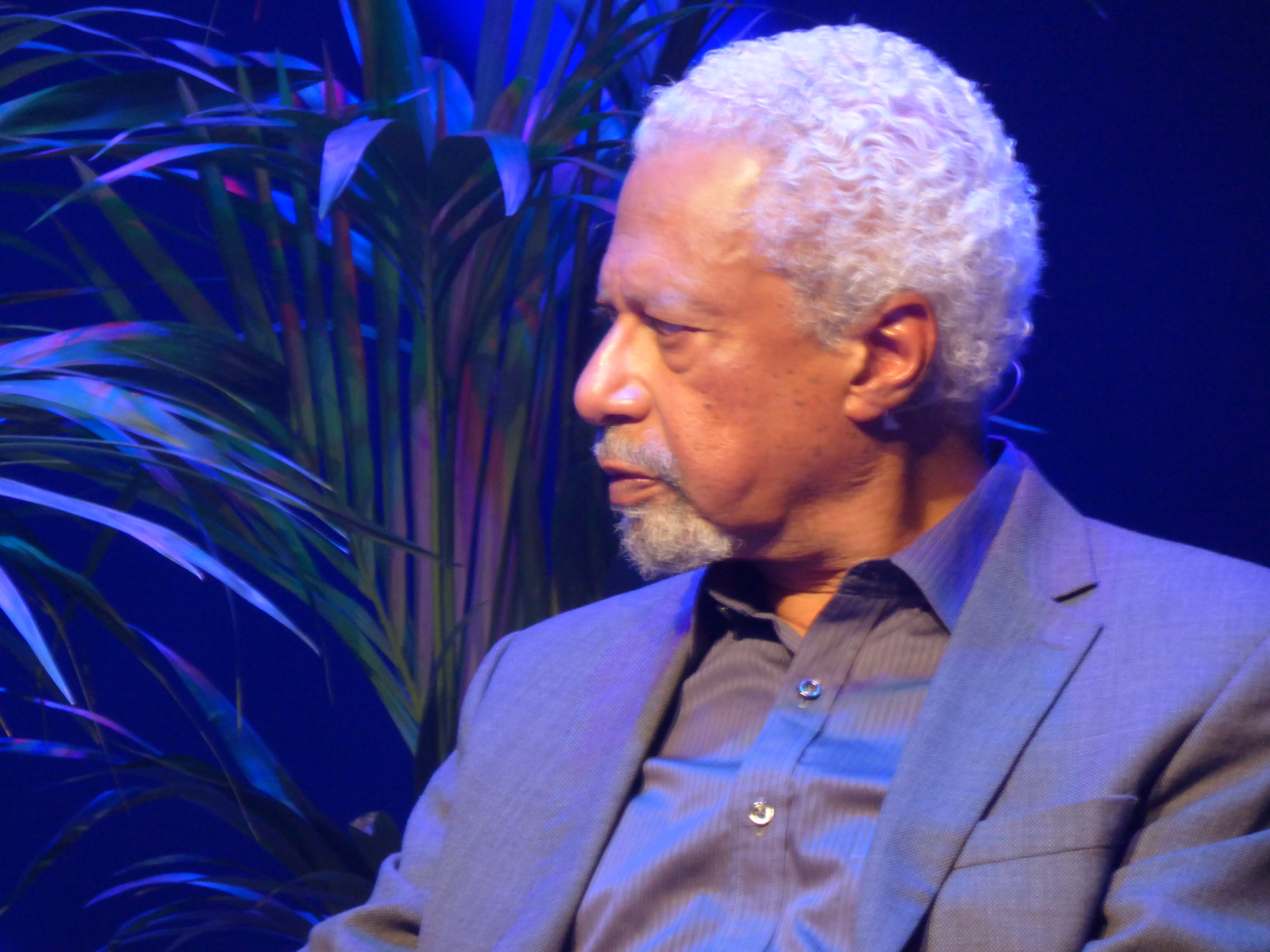
Gurnah at the Norwegian Festival of Literature in Lillehammer, June 2022.

Literary critics and societies were stunned when the Swedish Academy awarded the prize to Gurnah who they described was quite unknown and whose novels are unheard or little read. His announcement came as an "obscure event." Before the announcement, Gurnah was also not included in the 2021 Ladbrokes odds and never labeled as a frontrow contender for the prize. Questions were raised as to whether his selection was still in keeping with Nobel's will that the prize be awarded to an author who "in the field of literature, produced the most outstanding work in an idealistic direction". Gurnah himself even thought the announcement was a prank. It was instead believed that perrennial contender Ngũgĩ wa Thiong'o, a Kenyan academic and author who served also as Gurnah's professor in African literature, would be the rightful recipient for the 2021 Nobel prize. Other favourites to win the prize in 2021 included French author Annie Ernaux (awarded in 2022), Antigua-American writer Jamaica Kincaid, Japanese novelist Haruki Murakami and Canadian Margaret Atwood.

Following the announcement, numerous African authors, artists, and journalists praised the choice and warmly congratulated him. Nigerian Wole Soyinka, the first African laureate in 1986, commented on the news by saying:

"The Nobel returns home. It so happens that this has been a period of extensive interviews and cultural encounters for me across continents. And my easiest question has always been in relation to the Arts, especially after being obliged to concede the bleak truths over a continent in permanent travail. To be able to respond that the Arts – and literature in particular – are well and thriving, a sturdy flag waved above depressing actualities by a young, confident generation has always made those conversations bearable, even combative. Now, unquestionably, my audiences will find themselves compelled to admit that I do not exaggerate. May the tribe increase!"

Rwandan-French author Scholastique Mukasonga, who is often mentioned as a contender for the Nobel prize, commented with the following statement:

"I salute the Nobel’s jury who, beyond the Tanzanian author Abulrazak Gurnah, rewards and honors African intellectuals. But the African continent also has intellectual women among its ranks. I hope that, one day, a female writer from Black Africa will enter the pantheon of Nobel laureates."

Gurnah's editor Alexandra Pringle at Bloomsbury said she was thrilled for him to get the recognition that, it seemed, he had been long denied. She describes him as a writer "as important as Chinua Achebe with a writing style that was particularly beautiful and grave and also humorous and kind and sensitive." While author Giles Foden has called Gurnah "one of Africa's greatest living writers". Author Ben Okri commented on his win, saying: "A wonderful moment for Africa, for literature, and for black people. Gurnah has been writing with quiet force since the eighties. Very proud of his achievement." Kenyan academic Mũkoma wa Ngũgĩ also congratulated him saying,

"This is a huge recognition for African literature and East African writing. Certainly I would have been happier if my father, Ngũgĩ wa Thiong’o had won and brought the medal to our hometown, Limuru but Africa is home and this a great milestone for the African literary tradition. A warm and hearty congratulations to Gurnah..."

Before winning the award, his writing had not achieved the same commercial success of other Nobel winners. Asked to comment on why there had been so few Black Nobel Prize winners for literature, Gurnah noted that "the exclusion of non-European people from certain kinds of recognitions, or the exclusion of women from certain kinds of recognitions, is only just now beginning to become an issue or a thing people are concerned to put right", and said that the world was changing.

== Award ceremony ==
=== Nobel lecture ===
Unable to participate in the December award ceremony in Stockholm, due to the COVID-19 pandemic restrictions, Gurnah's Nobel lecture entitled "Writing" was broadcast from London. In his lecture, he discussed his earliest memories of reading and writing as well as how his observations of colonization and immigration influenced his desire to write. He, joining the roster of laureates which includes Harold Pinter, Doris Lessing and Toni Morrison, made clear that "writing cannot be just about battling and polemics, however invigorating and comforting that can be." As summary to his lecture, he described writing in the following manner:

"Writing is not about one thing, not about this issue or that, or this concern or another, and since its concern is human life in one way or another, sooner or later cruelty and love and weakness become its subject. I believe that writing also has to show what can be otherwise, what it is that the hard domineering eye cannot see, what makes people, apparently small in stature, feel assured in themselves regardless of the disdain of others. So I found it necessary to write about that as well, and to do so truthfully, so that both the ugliness and the virtue come through, and the human being appears out of the simplification and stereotype. When that works, a kind of beauty comes out of it. And that way of looking makes room for frailty and weakness, for tenderness amid cruelty, and for a capacity for kindness in unlooked for sources. It is for these reasons that writing has been for me a worthwhile and absorbing part of my life."

=== Prize presentation ===
Nobel Committee member Ellen Mattson delivering the presentation speech at Stockholm on December 10, 2021, said the following state about Gurnah:

A story is told again and again in Abdulrazak Gurnah's novels. It concerns a boy who disappears or is kidnapped, sold, taken like Moses from the bulrushes, or is fleeing to save his life. He grows into a young man living where he doesn’t belong, where he is forced to find ways of managing both the sorrow of ruptured contact with the past, and also the shock of encountering a society that is basically hostile. The strategies he tries are irony, withdrawal, silence and lies.

Here, lies equate to literary fiction; along with much else, Gurnah's writing is about the genesis of writers and how stories emerge as a means of understanding what has happened, but also creating an alternative: an improved or simply different version to offer loved ones and use as a shield against revealing light. But the protection transforms over time into a sickness, a Nessus Tunic that destroys its wearer, and the young man becomes slightly older, then finally an old man fossilised in a life lie, trying to break a silence that has become a wall against the world.

=== Ceremonial presentation in London ===
Gurnah received his Nobel Prize medal and diploma from Ambassador Mikaela Kumlin Granit during a simple ceremonial presentation at the Swedish Ambassador's Residence in London, United Kingdom on December 6, 2021. Dr. Bashir Abu-Manneh, Head of the university's School of English, said: "It is right that Professor Gurnah is being awarded the Nobel Prize for Literature... and recognized for a literary craft that is infused by humanity’s common pursuit of justice. This is the story of our times, and Professor Gurnah has been telling it for decades."

== Nobel Committee ==
The Swedish Academy's Nobel Committee for the 2021 Nobel Prize in Literature were the following:

Committee Members
Seat No.	Picture	Name	Elected	Position	Profession
4		Anders Olsson (b. 1949)	2008	committee chair	literary critic, literary historian
11		Mats Malm (b. 1964)	2018	associate member permanent secretary	translator, literary historian, editor
8		Jesper Svenbro (b. 1944)	2006	member	poet, classical philologist
12		Per Wästberg (b. 1933)	1997	member	novelist, journalist, poet, essayist
13		Anne Swärd (b. 1969)	2019	member	novelist
9		Ellen Mattson (b. 1963)	2019	member	novelist, essayist
