= Li Jingjing =

Li Jingjing may refer to:

- Li Jingjing (canoeist) (born 1985), Chinese slalom canoeist
- Li Jingjing (rower) (born 1994), Chinese rower
- Jingjing Li, Chinese-American materials scientist
- Jing-Jing Lee (李晶晶; Lǐ Jīngjīng), Singaporean writer
- Li Jingjing, CGTN reporter and YouTuber
