= Pilgrims Way (novel) =

1988 novel by Abdulrazak Gurnah

- Author: Abdulrazak Gurnah
- Language: English
- Publisher: Jonathan Cape (UK)
- Publication date: 1988
- Preceded by: Memory of Departure
- Followed by: Dottie

Pilgrims Way is a novel by Abdulrazak Gurnah, first published in 1988 by Jonathan Cape in the United Kingdom. It is Gurnah's second novel.

== Plot ==
The protagonist of Pilgrims Way is Daud, an immigrant to England from Tanzania who works as an orderly in Canterbury in the 1970s. Daud experiences racist abuse from skinheads and others and begins to feel fearful and dejected as a result. Daud is named for the biblical figure David. Daud develops a romantic attachment to Catherine Mason, a nurse. Daud's other friends include Lloyd, a white man with racist tendencies, and Karta, a pan-African Black nationalist.

== Reception ==
Critic Jopi Nyman argues that Pilgrims Way, like Gurnah's novels By the Sea (2001) and Desertion (2005), evinces "an interest in the structures of feeling generated by migration and exile". Maria Jesus Cabarcos Traseira reads Pilgrims Way as a pastoral in which Daud is "transformed" through "moments of harmony with nature". Critics Ann Blake, Leela Gandhi, and Sue Thomas, comparing Pilgrims Way to Dottie and Admiring Silence (1996), state that Pilgrims Way "take[s] up the damaging day to day experiences of migration and black Britishness".

In Trinidad and Tobago Newsday, Debbie Jacob writes: "Pilgrim’s Way demonstrates Gurnah’s remarkable restraint in presenting his characters’ stories. He is a master of that old piece of writing advice, 'Show, don’t tell.' Gurnah shows his characters’ complex lives and feelings without telling the reader what to feel or think. This evokes empathy while allowing readers to experience, however vicariously, the conflicts and ambiguity immigrants go through in their conflicted lives."

== Sources ==
- Cabarcos Traseira, Maria Jesus (2011). "Between Diasporic Identity and Agency: Versions of the Pastoral in Gurnah's Pilgrims Way and Mahjoub's Navigation of a Rainmaker". In Wawrzinek, Jennifer; Makokha, J.K.S. (eds.). Negotiating Afropolitanism: Essays on Borders and Spaces in Contemporary African Literature and Folklore. Brill Publishers. pp. 235–258. doi:10.1163/9789042032231_017. ISBN 978-90-420-3223-1.
- Mirmotahari, Emad (May 2013). "From Black Britain to Black Internationalism in Abdulrazak Gurnah's Pilgrims Way". English Studies in Africa. 56 (1): 17–27. doi:10.1080/00138398.2013.780679. ISSN 0013-8398.
- Nyman, Jopi (16 March 2017). "Migration and Melancholia in Abdulrazak Gurnah's Pilgrims Way". Displacement, Memory, and Travel in Contemporary Migrant Writing. Brill Publishers. pp. 114–133. doi:10.1163/9789004342064_010. ISBN 978-90-04-34206-4.
