= Philip Mitchell (disambiguation) =

Philip Mitchell is an English author, playwright, poet and translator.

Philip, Phillip or Phil Mitchell may also refer to:

- Philip Mitchell (colonial administrator) (1890–1964), British Colonial administrator
- Phillip Mitchell (born 1944), American R&B singer, songwriter, and record producer
- Phil Mitchell, fictional character in EastEnders
- Phil Mitchell (politician) (born 1953), former Australian politician
