= A Pilgrim's Way =

Poem by Rudyard Kipling often set to music

Song
- Songwriter: Rudyard Kipling

"A Pilgrim's Way" is a poem by Rudyard Kipling. It was set to music by Peter Bellamy, and has been recorded by Cockersdale, Finest Kind, John Roberts & Tony Barrand, Damien Barber & Mike Wilson, as well as the band Pilgrims’ Way (comprising Lucy Wright, Tom Kitching and Edwin Beasant).

Being a well-documented song publicised by Mudcat, and Mainly Norfolk, the song was recorded by Jon Boden and Oli Steadman for inclusion in their respective lists of daily folk songs "A Folk Song a Day" and "365 Days of Folk".
