= Un Nos Ola Leuad =

Welsh novel

Un Nos Ola Leuad (One Moonlit Night) is a 1961 novel written by Welsh poet and novelist Caradog Prichard who wrote in Welsh. In 1973 it was partially translated into English as Full Moon by Welsh novelist Menna Gallie. In 1995 it was translated into English by Philip Mitchell with an introduction by Welsh editor and writer Menna Bains. In 1999 this translation was re-issued as a Twentieth Century Classic in the Penguin Classics series. Another edition was published in 2009 by Canongate Books with a foreword by Jan Morris and an afterword by Niall Griffths.

== Plot ==
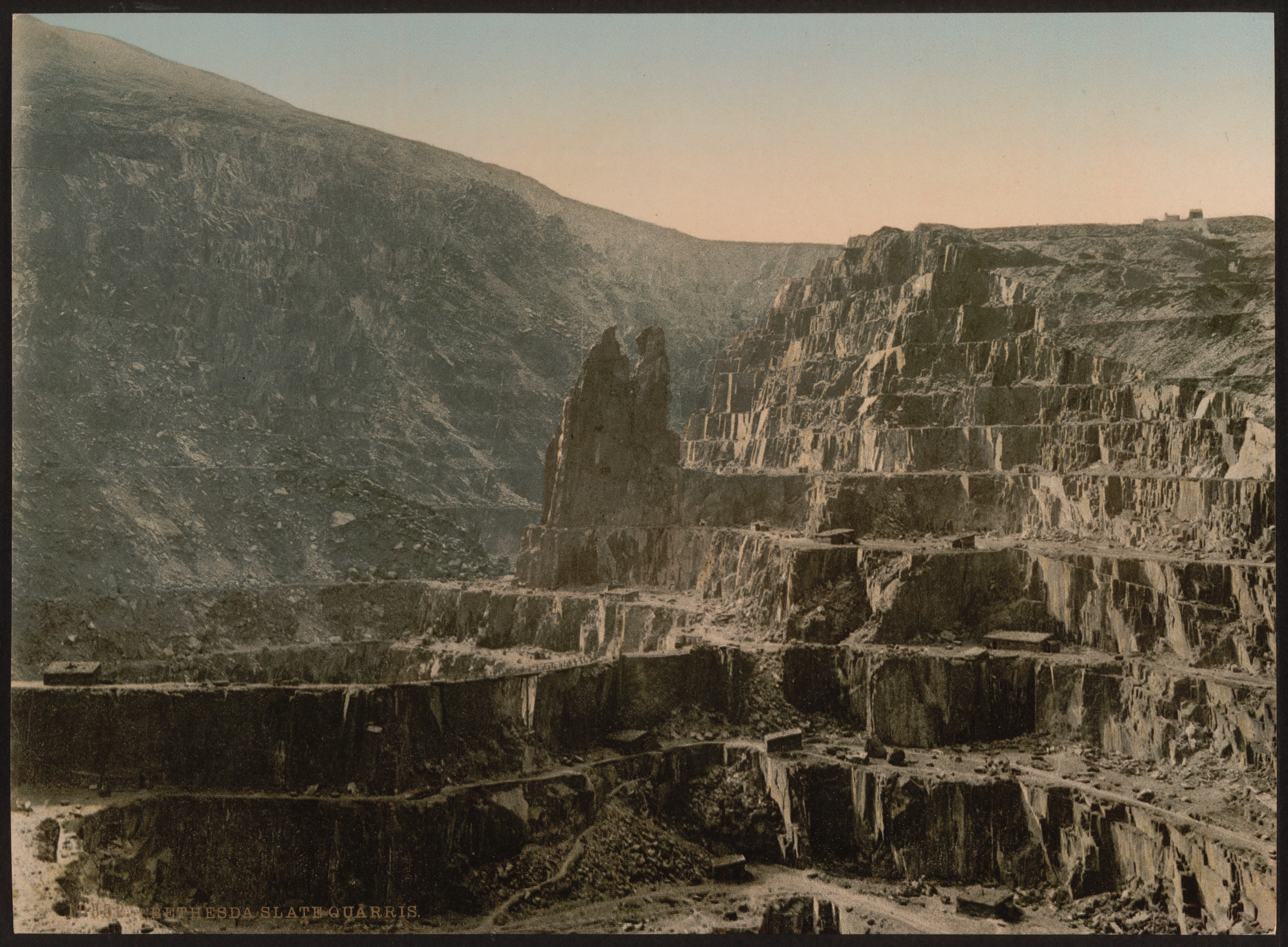
Penrhyn Quarry, near Bethesda, circa 1900 - Prichard was born in Bethesda in 1904. It was an almost entirely Welsh-speaking village and owed its existence to the slate quarrying industry. In 1905, when Prichard was 5 months old his father was killed in a quarry accident.

The novel is an account of childhood, and depicts a mother-son relationship, seen from the viewpoint of the son. It is set in Bethesda, Wales around the years 1915–1920, in the midst of the North Wales quarrying areas. Bethesda is only referred to as "the Village", but neighbouring places are given their real names. The novel has autobiographical echoes. Prichard wrote the novel in middle age and it was completed after his mother's death in 1954.

== Response and analysis ==
Prichard's biographer, Menna Baines, has remarked upon the difference in what is made of the community as it is looked at in Prichard's work, with how it appears in the work of Kate Roberts, and T. Rowland Hughes, also writers of the Caernarfonshire quarrying district.

"This community traditionally portrayed as [...] hard-working, devout, [of] cultured and politically aware quarrymen, belonging to a whole community of like-minded people was a potent myth of the Welsh-Nonconformist-Radical tradition [...] in Prichard's novel the local pub seems more the focus of village life, and in place of the dignity and stoicism portrayed in the Roberts/Rowland Hughes world [...] here people crack and go under with the strain, commit suicide and go insane [...] religion is not an anchor, but an obsession, gossip and superstition, not political ideas are exchanged on the streets." Comparisons have been made with the world of Dylan Thomas's Under Milk Wood.

In 2022, One Moonlit Night was included on the "Big Jubilee Read" list of 70 books by Commonwealth authors, selected to celebrate the Platinum Jubilee of Elizabeth II.
