= Theft (Gurnah novel) =

2025 novel by Abdulrazak Gurnah

- 2025 Book jacket
- Author: Abdulrazak Gurnah
- Audio read by: Ashley Zhangazha
- Subject: Identity, belonging, theft
- Genre: Bildungsroman Historical fiction Literary fiction
- Set in: Tanzania
- Publisher: Riverhead Books
- Publication date: March 2025
- Publication place: United Kingdom, United States
- Media type: Print, E-book, Audio
- Pages: 296
- ISBN: 9780593852606
- OCLC: 1451508297
- Website: Official website

Theft is the eleventh novel written by Abdulrazak Gurnah, who was awarded the 2021 Nobel Prize in Literature. The novel examines and chronicles the lives of three Tanzanians and their relationships with each other at the beginning of the 21st century. This book was published by Riverhead Books in March 2025.

== Plot ==
The book chronicles the lives of Karim, Fauzia, and Badar in Tanzania, across the late 1980s, 1990s and 2000s.

It opens with Karim's account, detailing his childhood in the former Sultanate of Zanzibar. His mother, Raya, falls in love with a member of the socialist, Cuban-trained Umma Party, which alarms her father. He forces her into a marriage with Bakari Abbas, a man twice her age who was divorced previously. This marriage leads to the birth of Karim. It falls apart by the time Karim turns three, due to Bakari Abbas' abuse. Raya returns to her parent's home, eventually leaving Karim with his grandparents to move to Dar es Salaam. There, she remarries the pharmacist Haji. Some years later, Karim and his mother reconnect and rebuild their relationship, a repairing that is helped by his attending the University of Dar es Salaam. While he is a student at the university, he meets Badar, his mother's servant, or house "boi".

At 12, almost 13, Badar is brought from his village to Dar es Salaam to work as a servant for Karim's mother, whom he calls "mistress". He finds himself enjoying the work, Raya's beauty, and Haji's jolly behavior. Badar keeps a wide berth from Haji's father, Uncle Othman, however, as he seems to strongly dislike him. After some time, he meets Karim, and grows to love him. Years after his arrival, Uncle Othman accuses Badar of stealing groceries to sell. This leads to Haji telling Badar the story of Badar's biological father, who abandoned him as an infant. He tells him how his father quarreled and fought with Uncle Othman, stealing what was left of his spirit after the death of his wife and daughter, Haji's mother and sister. He also reveals that Badar is a relative of theirs, not a random servant.

After the incident, Karim offers him space in his home in Zanzibar, where he lives with his wife, Fauzia. Fauzia is beautiful and smart, having been one of the top students of her class. But her mother worries for her, since, as a child, she had the "falling down sickness". Fauzia is encouraged to become a doctor or a lawyer, but chooses to become a teacher instead, as it is her passion. Badar moves in with Fauzia and Karim, and quickly falls in love with Fauzia. Karim helps him gain employment at a local hotel that was once the home of Indian merchants, and finds him a room in a home owned by a man who works in Abu Dhabi.

Badar begins to excel at his job. Karim and Fauzia have a baby named Nasra. They are initially excited by the pregnancy and baby, but things quickly unravel. Fauzia is diagnosed with post-partum depression, and finds herself unable to keep up with the demands of cooking, cleaning, and baby-rearing. Karim reveals himself to be selfish and demanding in turn; he gets upset when Fauzia's mother comes to help, he is mad when Fauzia refuses to make love to him, and he hates the sound of his daughter's crying. A European Union funded program brings NGO volunteers to Badar's hotel. The volunteers, as well as the European tourists visiting the hotel, flirt with Badar, who ignores their advances. Karim begins an affair with one of the volunteers, who asks Karim to spend a weekend traveling with her. Karim assaults his daughter, and then leaves for the trip, leading to the end of his relationships with Fauzia and Badar.

At the end of the novel, four years have passed. Karim has moved to Dar es Salaam, abandoning his wife and daughter. He is working with the EU, and on a pathway to becoming a government minister. Badar has been welcomed by Fauzia's family, and helps raise Nasra with Fauzia. The novel ends with Badar and Fauzia holding hands, beginning a romantic relationship.

== Reception ==
Ron Charles writing for The Washington Post says, " 'Theft," the first novel Gurnah has published since winning the Nobel, offers an example of such compassionate, revelatory seeing ... [and] There's something almost disorienting about Gurnah's narrative as he moves from one person to the next, willfully thwarting our desire to settle on a protagonist."

Lauren Christensen of The New York Times says, "Gurnah's stoic prose isn't always well suited to the tragic, even operatic events that unfold as Karim, Fauzia and Badar make their way in 1980s Tanzania; the author's genteel formality can feel anachronistic and awkward."
