= The Hired Man =

The Hired Man may refer to:

- The Hired Man (Bragg novel), a 1969 novel by Melvyn Bragg
  - The Hired Man (musical), a 1984 musical adaptation of the novel
- The Hired Man (Forna novel), a 2013 novel by Aminatta Forna
- The Hired Man (film), a 1918 American silent comedy film

== See also ==
- The Hired Hand, a 1971 American Western film directed by Peter Fonda
