= The Last Gift =

2011 novel by Abdulrazak Gurnah

- First edition
- Author: Abdulrazak Gurnah
- Publisher: Bloomsbury
- Publication date: 2011
- Publication place: UK
- Pages: 288
- ISBN: 978-1-4088-1518-2
- Preceded by: Desertion
- Followed by: Gravel Heart

The Last Gift is a novel by Abdulrazak Gurnah. It is Gurnah's eighth novel and was first published by Bloomsbury Publishing in 2011. The plot centres on Abbas, an immigrant from east Africa living in England, who reflects on his past after he has a stroke.

The novel received mixed reviews. Aminatta Forna, writing for the Financial Times, described it as "majestic in scale" and praised Gurnah's storytelling and examination of familial relationships. Giles Foden of The Guardian applauded Gurnah's prose. On the other hand, a reviewer for Kirkus Reviews criticized the transitions between the past and the present and felt that the book's central dilemma was not compelling enough. Publishers Weekly wrote that the narrative's pace was occasionally too slow, but praised the plot and the themes of mortality and memory.
