= Summer Lightning (disambiguation) =

Summer Lightning is a 1929 novel by P. G. Wodehouse.

Summer lightning is an electrical phenomenon.

Summer Lightning may also refer to:

- Summer Lightning (short story collection), a 1986 collection of short stories by Olive Senior
- Summer Lightning (film), a 1933 British comedy film
- "Summer Lightning", a song by Bad Suns from the 2022 album Apocalypse Whenever
