= Abdulrazak Gurnah =

Novelist and Nobel laureate (born 1948)

Abdulrazak Gurnah FRSL
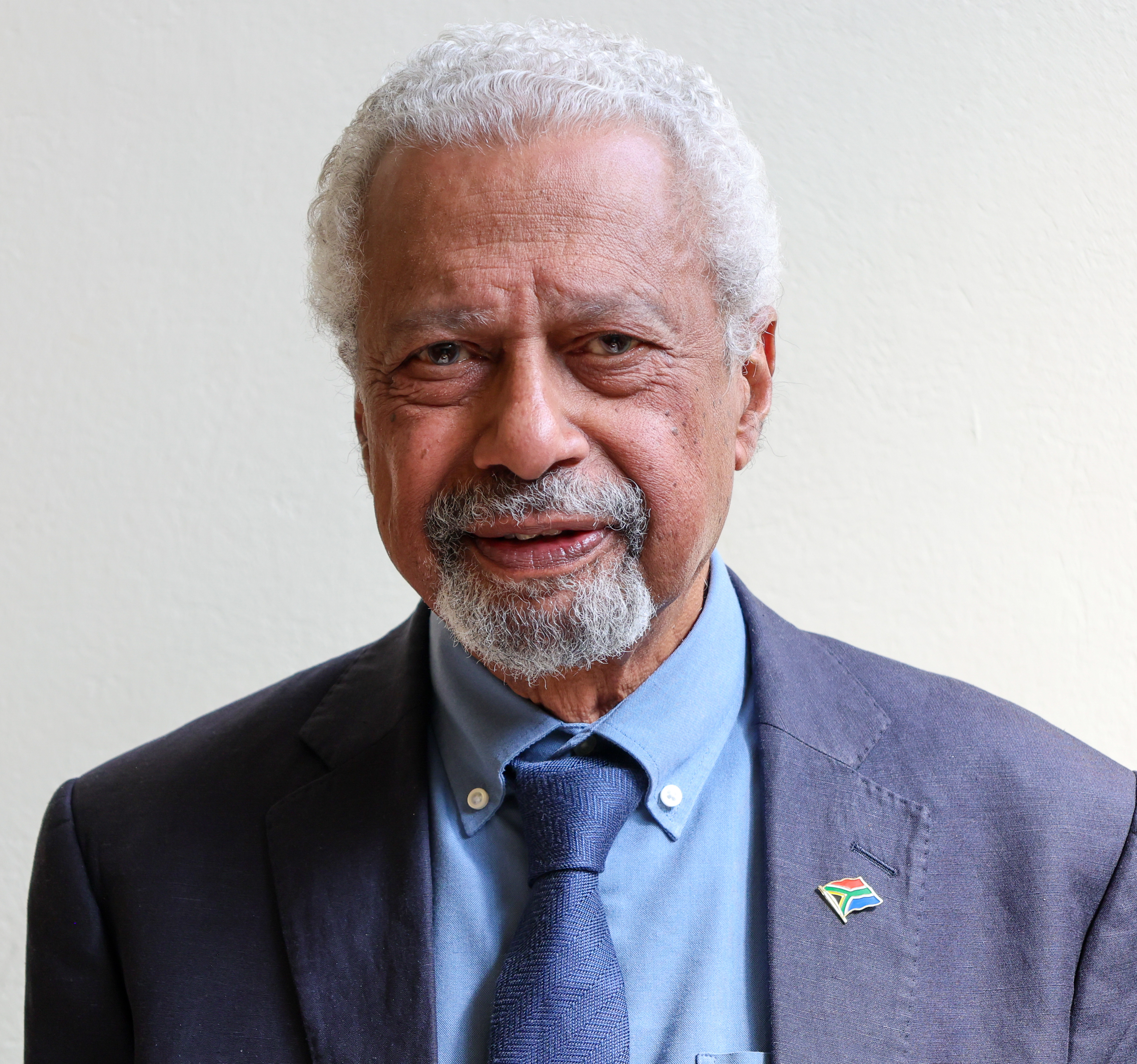
- Gurnah in September 2024
- Born: Abdulrazak Salim Gurnah; 20 December 1948 (age 77); Sultanate of Zanzibar (Tanzania)
- Education: Canterbury Christ Church University (BA); University of Kent (MA, PhD)
- Occupations: Novelist; professor
- Writing career
- Language: English
- Notable works: Paradise (1994); By the Sea (2001); Desertion (2005)
- Notable awards: Nobel Prize in Literature (2021)
- Website: rcwlitagency.com

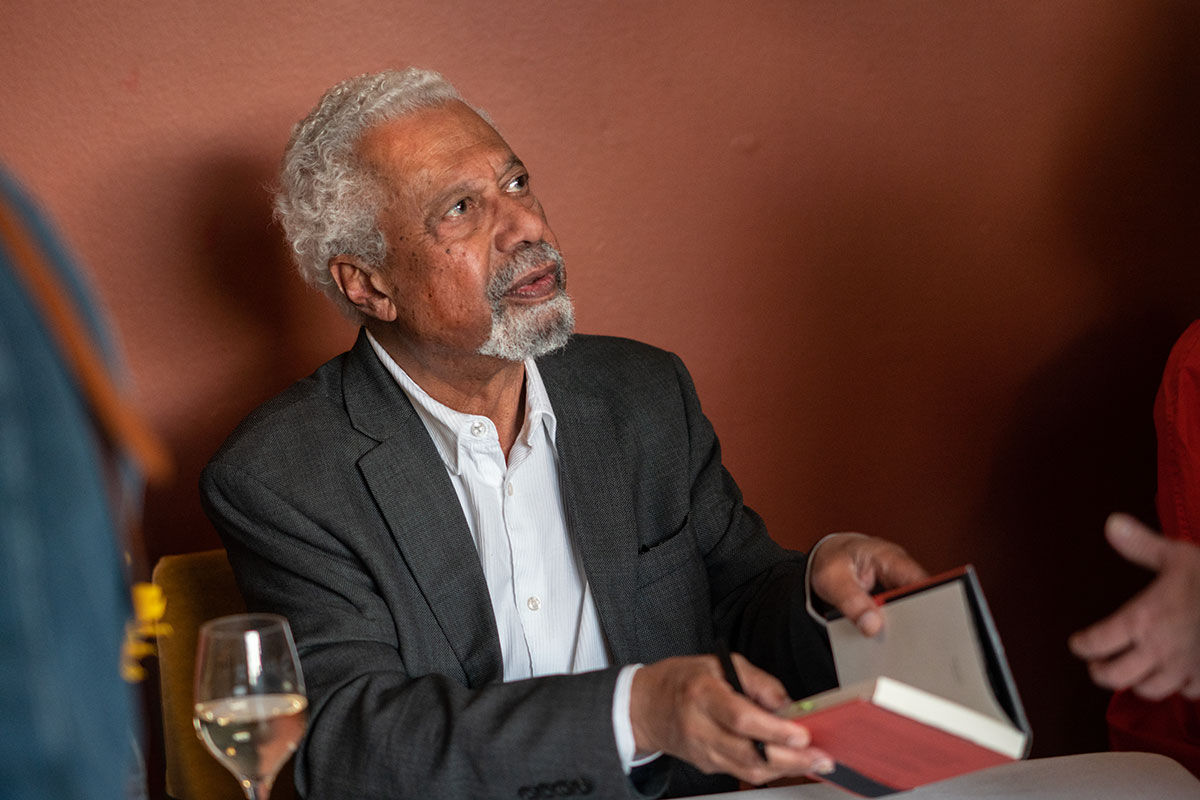
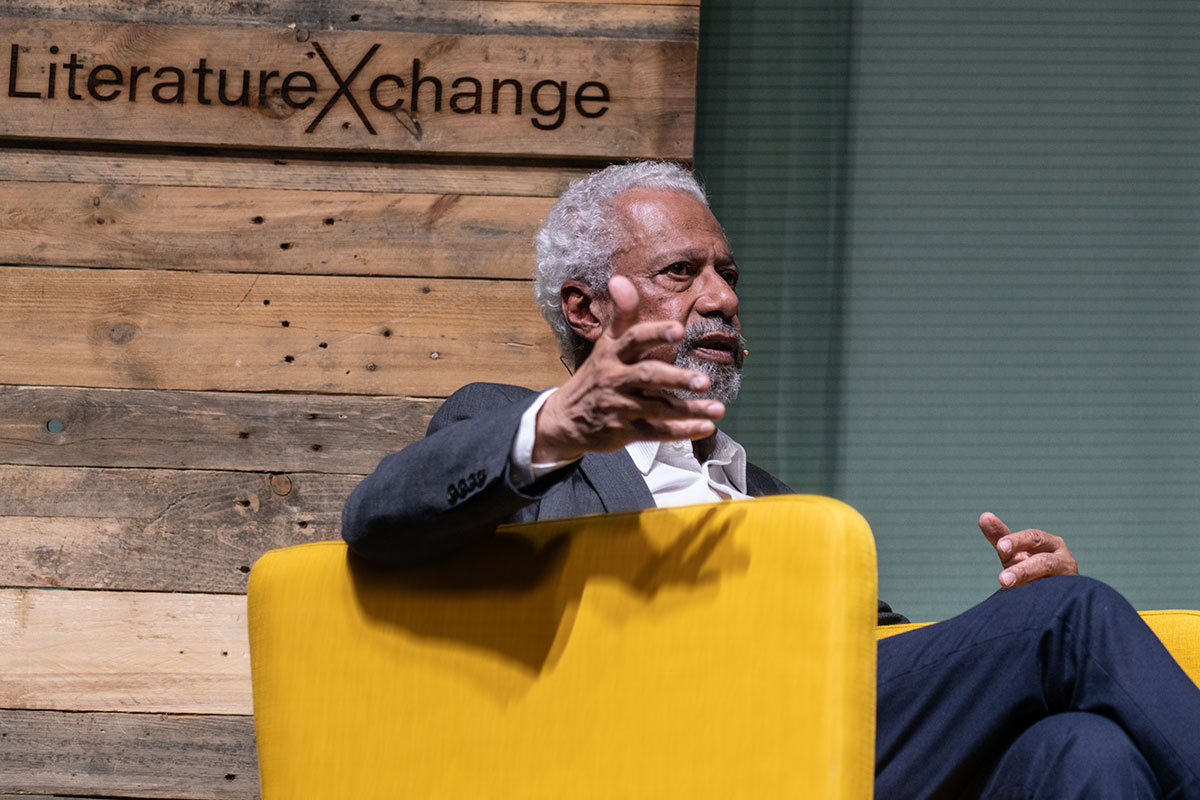
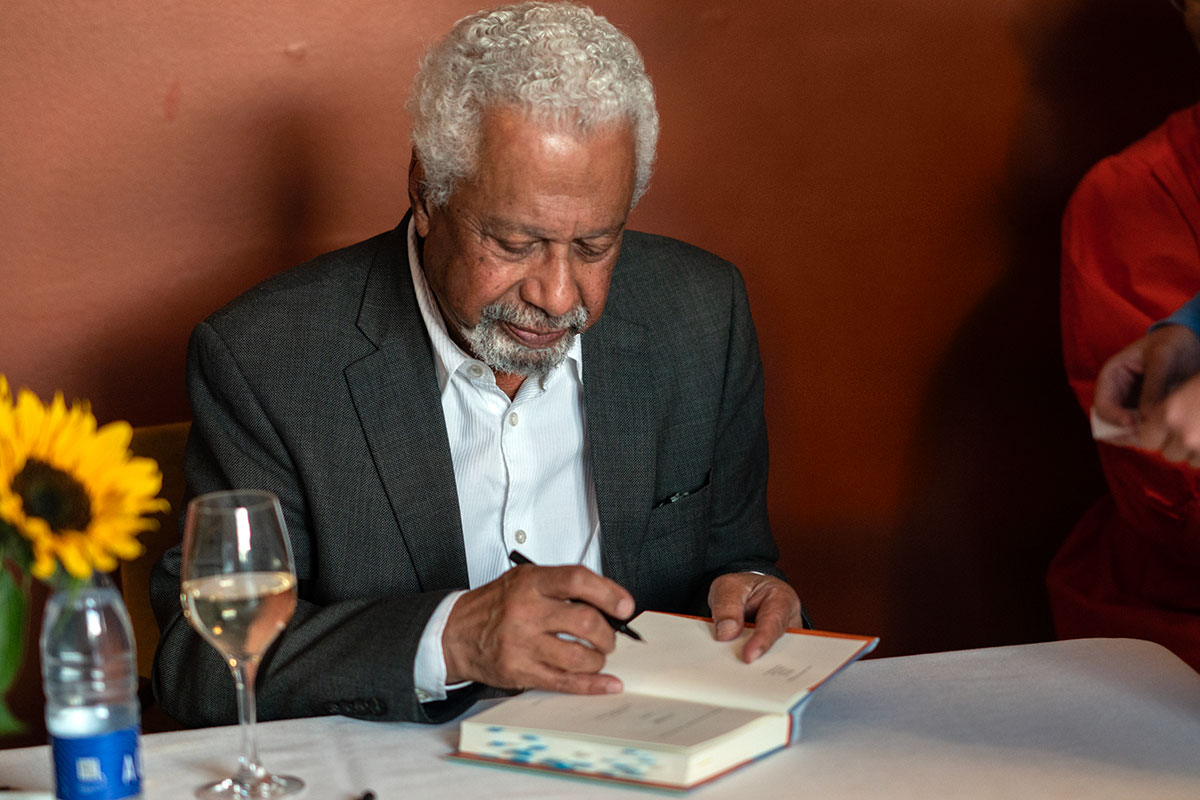
LiteratureXchange Festival (2025 Denmark)
Photo by Hreinn Gudlaugsson

Abdulrazak Gurnah FRSL (born 20 December 1948) is a Tanzanian novelist and academic of Yemeni origin. He was born in the Sultanate of Zanzibar and moved to the United Kingdom in the 1960s as a refugee during the Zanzibar Revolution. His novels include Paradise (1994), which was shortlisted for both the Booker and the Whitbread Prize; By the Sea (2001), which was longlisted for the Booker and shortlisted for the Los Angeles Times Book Prize; and Desertion (2005), shortlisted for the Commonwealth Writers' Prize.

In 2021, Gurnah was awarded the Nobel Prize in Literature "for his uncompromising and compassionate penetration of the effects of colonialism and the fates of the refugee in the gulf between cultures and continents". On 1 September 2024, Gurnah took up the appointment of the Arts Professor of Literature at New York University Abu Dhabi. He is also Emeritus Professor of English and Postcolonial Literatures at the University of Kent.

== Early life and education ==
Abdulrazak Salim Gurnah was born on 20 December 1948 in the Sultanate of Zanzibar. His father and uncle were businessmen who had immigrated from Yemen. He left the island, which later became part of Tanzania, at the age of 18, following the overthrow of the ruling Arab elite in the Zanzibar Revolution, arriving in England in 1968 as a refugee. He is of Arab heritage. Gurnah has been quoted as saying: "I came to England when these words, such as asylum-seeker, were not quite the same – more people are struggling and running from terror states."

He initially studied at Christ Church College, Canterbury, whose degrees were at the time awarded by the University of London. He then moved to the University of Kent, where he earned his PhD with a thesis titled Criteria in the Criticism of West African Fiction, in 1982.

== Career ==
=== Academia ===
From 1980 to 1983, Gurnah lectured at Bayero University Kano in Nigeria. He then became a professor of English and postcolonial literature at the University of Kent, where he taught until his retirement in 2017. As of 2021 he is professor emeritus of English and postcolonial literatures at the university.

Since 1 September 2024, Gurnah has held the position of Arts Professor of Literature at New York University Abu Dhabi.

=== Fiction ===
Alongside his work in academia, Gurnah is a creative writer and novelist. He is the author of many short stories, essays and novels. He began writing out of homesickness in his 20s, starting with writing down thoughts in his diary, which turned into longer reflections about home, and eventually grew into writing fictional stories about other people. This created a habit of using writing as a tool to understand and record his experience of being a refugee, living in another land and the feeling of being displaced. These initial stories eventually became Gurnah's first novel, Memory of Departure (1987), which he wrote alongside his Ph.D. dissertation. This first book set the stage for his ongoing exploration of the themes of "the lingering trauma of colonialism, war and displacement" which feature in his subsequent novels, short stories and critical essays.

Although Gurnah's novels were received positively by critics, they were not commercially successful and, in some cases, were not published outside the United Kingdom. His readership changed dramatically after he was awarded the Nobel Prize for Literature in 2021, when publishers and booksellers struggled to meet the sudden surge in demand for his work. Only after the Nobel announcement did American publishers begin bidding for his novel. Afterlives, which was released by Riverhead Books in August 2022. Riverhead went on to acquire the rights to By the Sea and Desertion, two earlier works that had long been out of print.

While his first language is Swahili, he has used English as his literary language and integrates Swahili, Arabic and German into many of his writings despite some resistance from publishers who preferred to "italicize or Anglicise Swahili and Arabic references and phrases in his books". Gurnah has criticised the practices in both British and American publishing that want to "make the alien seem alien" by marking "foreign" terms and phrases with italics or by putting them in a glossary. As academic Hamid Dabashi notes, Gurnah "is integral to the manner in which Asian and African migratory and diasporic experiences have enriched and altered English language and literature. ... Calling authors like Gurnah diasporic, exilic, or any other such self-alienating term conceals the fact that English was native to him even before he set foot in England. English colonial officers had brought it home to him."

Consistent themes run through Gurnah's writing, including exile, displacement, belonging, colonialism and broken promises by the state. Most of his novels tell stories about people living in the developing world, affected by war or crisis, who may not be able to tell their own stories. Much of Gurnah's work is set on the coast of East Africa and many of his novels' protagonists were born in Zanzibar. Though Gurnah has not returned to live in Tanzania since he left at 18, he has said that his homeland "always asserts himself in his imagination, even when he deliberately tries to set his stories elsewhere."

Literary critic Bruce King posits that Gurnah's novels place East African protagonists in their broader international context, observing that in Gurnah's fiction "Africans have always been part of the larger, changing world". According to King, Gurnah's characters are often uprooted, alienated, unwanted and therefore are, or feel, resentful victims". Felicity Hand suggests that Gurnah's novels Admiring Silence (1996), By the Sea (2001) and Desertion (2005) all concern "the alienation and loneliness that emigration can produce and the soul-searching questions it gives rise to about fragmented identities and the very meaning of 'home'." She observes that Gurnah's characters typically do not succeed abroad following their migration, using irony and humour to respond to their situation.

Novelist Maaza Mengiste has described Gurnah's works by saying: "He has written work that is absolutely unflinching and yet at the same time completely compassionate and full of heart for people of East Africa. [...] He is writing stories that are often quiet stories of people who aren't heard, but there's an insistence there that we listen."

Aiming to build the readership for Gurnah's writing in Tanzania, the first translator of his novels into Swahili, academic Dr Ida Hadjivayanis of the School of Oriental and African Studies, has said: "I think if his work could be read in East Africa it would have such an impact. ... We can't change our reading culture overnight, so for him to be read the first steps would be to include Paradise and Afterlives in the school curriculum."

=== Other writing ===
Gurnah edited two volumes of Essays on African Writing and has published articles on a number of contemporary postcolonial writers, including V. S. Naipaul, Salman Rushdie, and Zoë Wicomb. He is the editor of A Companion to Salman Rushdie (Cambridge University Press, 2007). From 1987, Gurnah has been a contributing editor of Wasafiri and as of 2021 is on the magazine's advisory board.

== Other activities ==
He has been a judge for literary awards, including the Caine Prize for African Writing, the Booker Prize, and the RSL Literature Matters Awards. He supports a boycott of Israeli cultural institutions, including publishers and literary festivals. He was an original signatory of the manifesto "Refusing Complicity in Israel's Literary Institutions".

Gurnah was featured on the BBC Radio 4 programme Desert Island Discs on 25 May 2025.

== Awards and honours ==
Gurnah's 1994 novel Paradise was shortlisted for the Booker, the Whitbread and the Writers' Guild Prizes as well as the ALOA Prize for the best Danish translation. His novel By the Sea (2001) was longlisted for the Booker and shortlisted for the Los Angeles Times Book Prize, while Desertion (2005) was shortlisted for the 2006 Commonwealth Writers' Prize.

In 2006, Gurnah was elected a fellow of the Royal Society of Literature. In 2007, he won the RFI Témoin du Monde (Witness of the World) award in France for By the Sea.

On 7 October 2021, he was awarded the Nobel Prize in Literature for 2021 "for his uncompromising and compassionate penetration of the effects of colonialism and the fates of the refugee in the gulf between cultures and continents". Gurnah was the first Black writer since Toni Morrison in 1993 to receive it, and the first African writer since 2007, when Doris Lessing was the recipient.

== Personal life ==
As of 2021, Gurnah lives in Canterbury, Kent, England, and he has British citizenship. He maintains close ties with Tanzania, where he still has family and where he says he goes when he can: "I am from there. In my mind I live there."

He is married to Guyanese-born scholar of literature Denise DeCaires Narain.

== Writings ==
=== Novels ===
- Memory of Departure (1987)
- Pilgrims Way (1988)
- Dottie (1990)
- Paradise (1994) (shortlisted for the Booker Prize and the Whitbread Prize; selected for the Big Jubilee Read)
- Admiring Silence (1996)
- By the Sea (2001) (longlisted for the Booker Prize and shortlisted for the Los Angeles Times Book Prize)
- Desertion (2005) (shortlisted for the Commonwealth Writers' Prize)
- The Last Gift (2011)
- Gravel Heart (2017)
- Afterlives (2020)
- Theft (2025)

=== Short stories ===
- "Cages" (1984), in African Short Stories, edited by Chinua Achebe and Catherine Lynette Innes, Heinemann Educational Books. ISBN 9780435902704
- "Bossy" (1994), in African Rhapsody: Short Stories of the Contemporary African Experience, edited by Nadežda Obradović. Anchor Books. ISBN 9780385468169
- "Escort" (1996), in Wasafiri, vol. 11, no. 23, 44–48. doi:10.1080/02690059608589487
- "The Photograph of the Prince" (2012), in Road Stories: New Writing Inspired by Exhibition Road, edited by Mary Morris. Royal Borough of Kensington & Chelsea, London. ISBN 9780954984847
- "My Mother Lived on a Farm in Africa" (2006), in NW 14: The Anthology of New Writing, Volume 14, selected by Lavinia Greenlaw and Helon Habila, London: Granta Books
- "The Arriver's Tale", in Refugee Tales, edited by David Herd and Anna Pincus (Comma Press, 2016, ISBN 9781910974230)
- "The Stateless Person's Tale", in Refugee Tales III, edited by David Herd and Anna Pincus (Comma Press, 2019, ISBN 9781912697113)

=== Non-fiction: essays and criticism ===
- "Matigari: A Tract of Resistance." In: Research in African Literatures, vol. 22, no. 4, Indiana University Press, 1991, pp. 169–72. JSTOR 3820366.
- "Imagining the Postcolonial Writer." In: Reading the 'New' Literatures in a Postcolonial Era. Edited by Susheila Nasta. D. S. Brewer, Cambridge, 2000. ISBN 9780859916011.
- "The Wood of the Moon." In: Transition, no. 88, Indiana University Press, Hutchins Center for African and African American Research at Harvard University, 2001, pp. 88–113. JSTOR 3137495.
- "Themes and Structures in Midnight's Children". In: The Cambridge Companion to Salman Rushdie. Edited by Abdulrazak Gurnah. Cambridge University Press, 2007. ISBN 9780521609951.
- "Mid Morning Moon". In: Wasafiri (3 May 2011), vol. 26, no. 2, pp. 25–29. doi:10.1080/02690055.2011.557532.
- Gurnah, Abdulrazak Abd al-Razzaq Abdulrazak (2011). "The Urge to Nowhere: Wicomb and Cosmopolitanism". Safundi. 12 (3–4): 261–275. doi:10.1080/17533171.2011.586828. Wikidata Q108824246.
- "Learning to Read". In: Matatu, no. 46, 2015, pp. 23–32, 268.

=== As editor ===
- Essays on African Writing Vol. 1 A re-evaluation and 2 Contemporary Literature (Heinemann Educational Books, 1993)
- The Cambridge Companion to Salman Rushdie (Cambridge University Press, 2007)

== Sources ==
- Hand, Felicity (2012). "Becoming Foreign: Tropes of Migrant Identity in Three Novels by Abdulrazak Gurnah". In Sell, Jonathan P. A. (ed.). Metaphor and Diaspora in Contemporary Writing. Palgrave Macmillan. pp. 39–58. doi:10.1057/9780230358454_3. ISBN 978-1-349-33956-3.
- King, Bruce (2006). "Abdulrazak Gurnah and Hanif Kureishi: Failed Revolutions". In Acheson, James; Ross, Sarah C.E. (eds.). The Contemporary British Novel Since 1980. New York: Palgrave Macmillan. pp. 85–94. doi:10.1007/978-1-349-73717-8_8. ISBN 978-1-349-73717-8. OCLC 1104713636.
- Lavery, Charné (May 2013). "White-washed Minarets and Slimy Gutters: Abdulrazak Gurnah, Narrative Form and Indian Ocean Space". English Studies in Africa. 56 (1): 117–127. doi:10.1080/00138398.2013.780686. ISSN 0013-8398. S2CID 143927840.
