= The Nowhere Man (Kamala Markandaya novel) =

1972 English-language novel by Kamala Markandaya

- Author: Kamala Markandaya
- Language: English
- Publisher: Allen Lane (UK)
- Publication date: 1972
- Publication place: India
- Media type: print

The Nowhere Man is a 1972 English-language novel by Kamala Markandaya. It was Markandaya's seventh novel, and her own favourite. The novel is a tragedy of alienation, centred on the racism experienced by an elderly Brahmin, Srinivas, who has lived in London for decades.

== Plot ==
Unlike her other novels, which were set mainly in India, The Nowhere Man is set in England, where Markandaya herself had been living since 1948. The novel's main protagonist, Srinivas, is an elderly spice importer who has lived in South London for almost fifty years, surviving his wife and one of his two sons. In the Britain of 1968, he now faces intensifying racism, reminding him of the slights he had once experienced as a university student in colonial India. As Srinivas slides into depression, the novel captures the cultural separation between first and second-generation immigrant generations: Srinivas's remaining son, Laxman, is impatient with and embarrassed by his father. For a while, Srinivas's self-belief is restored by a romantic relationship with Mrs Pickering, a down-at-heel divorcée, who moves into his house. However, their peace together is threatened by the racist hatred of their neighbours, to which they each find themselves reacting differently.

== Reception ==
The Nowhere Man received relatively little attention at the time it was published. However, it was included in the Penguin India reprints of Markandaya's work, and in 2019 a new edition was published by Hope Road to launch their new imprint, Small Axes.

In 2022, the book was included on the "Big Jubilee Read" list of 70 books by Commonwealth authors, selected to celebrate the Platinum Jubilee of Elizabeth II.
