= Dottie (novel) =

1990 novel by Abdulrazak Gurnah

- Author: Abdulrazak Gurnah
- Language: English
- Published: 1990
- Publisher: Jonathan Cape
- Preceded by: Pilgrims Way
- Followed by: Paradise

Dottie is a novel by Abdulrazak Gurnah published by Jonathan Cape in 1990. It is Gurnah's third novel.

Unlike most of Gurnah's protagonists, the eponymous Dottie Badoura Fatma Balfour, who is born in Leeds, England, is not from Zanzibar. Dottie grows up poor, in a family of "ambiguously mixed origins". The novel describes her struggle to serve as a parent for her brother and sister after her mother dies.

Dottie alludes to the works of Charles Dickens, particularly David Copperfield and Great Expectations.

== Sources ==
- Ajulu-Okungu, Anne (2 October 2014). "Power and Sociality of Food and Drink in Abdulrazak Gurnah's Dottie and Pilgrim's Way". Eastern African Literary and Cultural Studies. 1 (3–4): 130–139. doi:10.1080/23277408.2015.1053702. ISSN 2327-7408.
- Bungaro, Monica (July 2005). "Abdulrazak Gurnah's Dottie: A Narrative of (Un)Belonging". ARIEL: A Review of International English Literature. 36 (3–4). ISSN 1920-1222.
- Lewis, Simon (May 2013). "Postmodern Materialism in Abdulrazak Gurnah's Dottie: Intertextuality as Ideological Critique of Englishness". English Studies in Africa. 56 (1): 39–50. doi:10.1080/00138398.2013.780680. ISSN 0013-8398.
