= How We Disappeared =

2019 Jing-Jing Lee novel

- First edition cover
- Author: Jing-Jing Lee
- Language: English
- Genre: Novel, historical fiction
- Set in: Singapore, 1942 and 2000
- Publisher: Oneworld Publications
- Publication date: 2019
- Publication place: United Kingdom
- Media type: Print: hardback
- Pages: 352
- ISBN: 9781786074126
- OCLC: 1152198115
- Dewey Decimal: 823.92
- LC Class: PR9570.S53 L44
- Preceded by: The Ghost Bride

How We Disappeared: A Novel is a 2019 historical fiction novel by Singaporean author Jing-Jing Lee, written in English.

== Background ==
Lee developed the book from a short story she wrote, "Cardboard Lady," that appeared in her first collection, If I Could Tell You (2013). She named the main character Chiow Tee after her own mother; the name means "care for a brother" (照弟 zhàodì). She wanted to focus attention on the "comfort women" taken to work as slaves in Japanese military brothels, unlike other fiction about the occupation of Singapore which focused on resistance violence and male prisoners of war.

== Plot ==
Singapore, the year 2000: a twelve-year-old boy hears a mumbled confession from his grandmother on her deathbed, which leads him to doubt all he thought he knew about his families history.

== Reception ==
In the Financial Times, Zoë Apostolides praised the novel, saying "Lee intersperses these sections with real structural skill to form a deeply affecting whole, and one that reincarnates the disappeared by telling their many disparate stories."

How We Disappeared was shortlisted for the Singapore Literature Prize, and longlisted for the Women's Prize for Fiction and the HWA Debut Crown (a prize for historical writing).

In 2022, How We Disappeared was included on the Big Jubilee Read, a list of 70 books by Commonwealth authors produced to celebrate Queen Elizabeth II's Platinum Jubilee.
