= The Devil That Danced on the Water =

2002 book by Aminatta Forna

The Devil That Danced on the Water: A Daughter's Quest
- Author: Aminatta Forna
- Language: English
- Subject: Memoir, Sierra Leone history
- Published: 2002 (HarperCollins)
- Publication place: Scotland
- Media type: Print (hardback)
- Pages: 223
- ISBN: 9780802140487
- OCLC: 829656576

The Devil That Danced on the Water: A Daughter's Quest is a 2002 book by Aminatta Forna about her childhood and an investigation into the execution of her father, Mohamed Forna. It was serialised as a Book of the Week on BBC Radio 4 and was runner-up for the 2003 Samuel Johnson Prize.

== Reception ==
Reviewing The Devil That Danced on the Water for The Guardian, Victoria Brittain wrote: "Aminatta Forna's story of her father's execution on trumped-up treason charges, 25 years before anyone had heard of the Revolutionary United Front, gives a more personal framework for understanding the horror of the 1990s in the linked wars of Sierra Leone, Liberia, and Guinea."

Booklist called it "stunning" and "an important look at the sad state of politics in Sierra Leone", and the Library Journal saw it as "More than a tale of vindication, this book is filled with powerful descriptions and moving details and if overly long is nevertheless an important work."

Christopher Hope, writing in The Independent, stated: "Forna has written a book that is impossible to forget, or to confuse with any other memoir of tyrannical times." and found it "an obsessive, driven, refreshing book about Africa, despotism and exile."

The Devil That Danced on the Water has also been reviewed by Publishers Weekly, Kirkus Reviews, People, Metro, The New Yorker, Confrontation, and Entertainment Weekly.

The Devil That Danced on the Water was on the shortlist for the 2003 Samuel Johnson Prize. It was also Book of the Week on BBC Radio 4 and was serialised in the Sunday Times.

Comparisons have been drawn between this work and Looking for Transwonderland: Travels in Nigeria (2012) by Noo-Saro-Wiwa.
