= Mohamed Sorie Forna =

Sierra Leonean politician

- Born: Mohamed Sorie Forna; 25 November 1935; Freetown, Sierra Leone
- Died: 19 July 1975 (aged 39); Freetown, Sierra Leone
- Education: Bo School, University of Aberdeen
- Occupations: Medical doctor; politician; Member of Parliament; Minister of Finance
- Children: Aminatta Forna
- Writing career
- Language: English, Temne, Krio

Mohamed Sorie Forna (25 November 1935 – 19 July 1975) was a Sierra Leonean medical doctor, politician, Member of Parliament, and Minister of Finance who was active in the politics of Sierra Leone in the 1960s and 1970s.

Forna was the youngest Sierra Leonean to be appointed as Minister of Finance. Following his criticisms of the Siaka Stevens administration, Forna was executed for alleged treason.

The memoir, The Devil That Danced on the Water by Aminatta Forna, a daughter of Mohamed Forna, documents her experiences and the circumstances surrounding the political persecution of Forna.

== Early life and family background ==
Mohamed Sorie Forna was born on 25 November 1935 in the Kholifa Mamunta-Mayossoh Chiefdom, Tonkolili District, Northern Protectorate to a prominent Sierra Leonean family of Temne origin.

His father, Roke Forna, was the traditional chief of the Kholifa Mamunta-Mayossoh Chiefdom. His mother, Ndora, was also of Temne origin and was the great-granddaughter of a Temne chief.

== Education and medical career ==
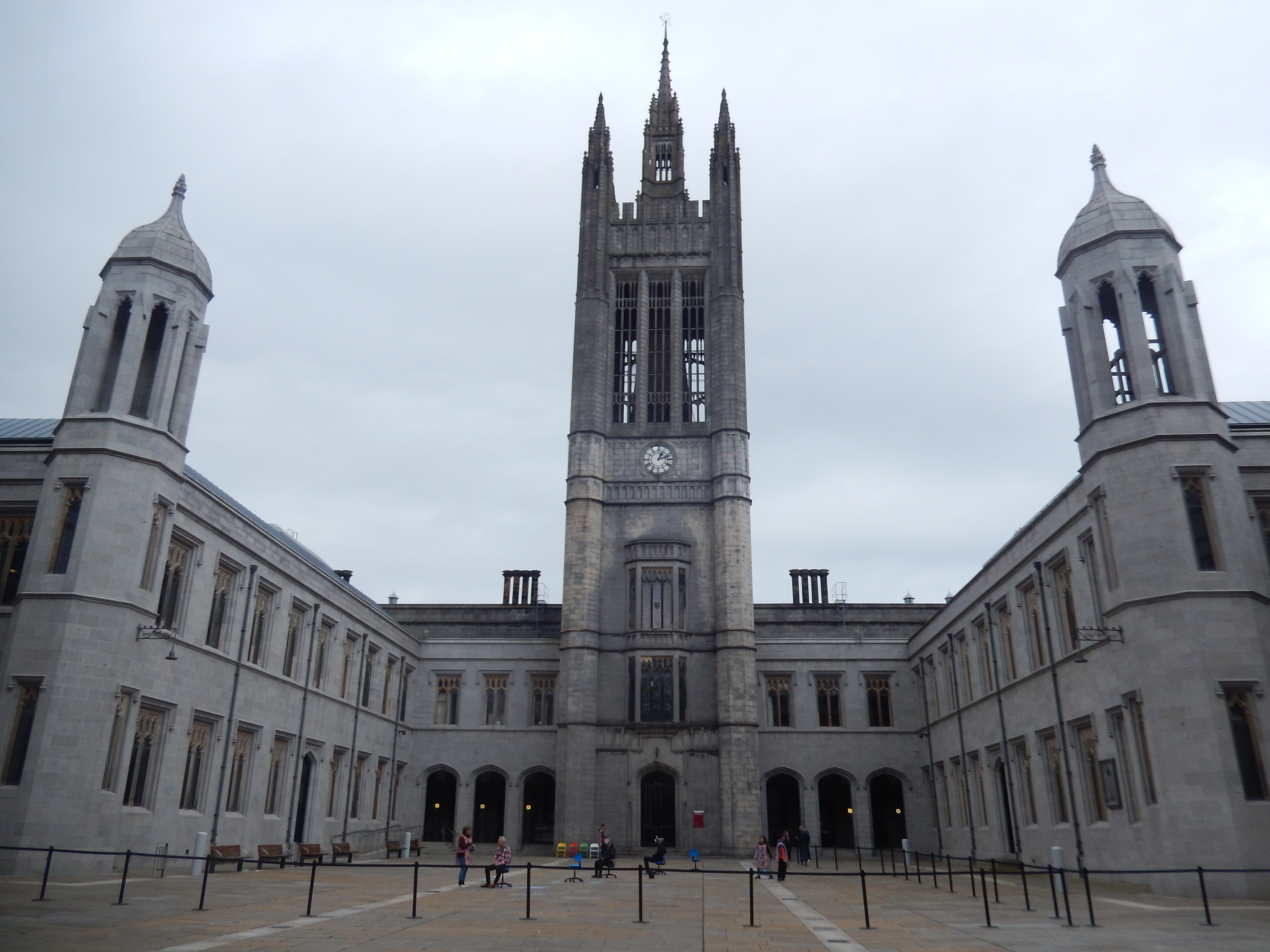
Marischal College, University of Aberdeen

Mohamed Forna was educated at the Bo School in Bo, Sierra Leone.

Forna subsequently received a government scholarship to pursue medical studies in Aberdeen, Scotland in 1956.

He attended the University of Aberdeen in Aberdeen, Scotland and gained a medical degree in 1962.

He returned to Sierra Leone in 1964 and worked as a physician in Freetown, Sierra Leone.

Forna then established himself in private practice in Kono, Sierra Leone where he treated several patients free of charge.

== Political career ==
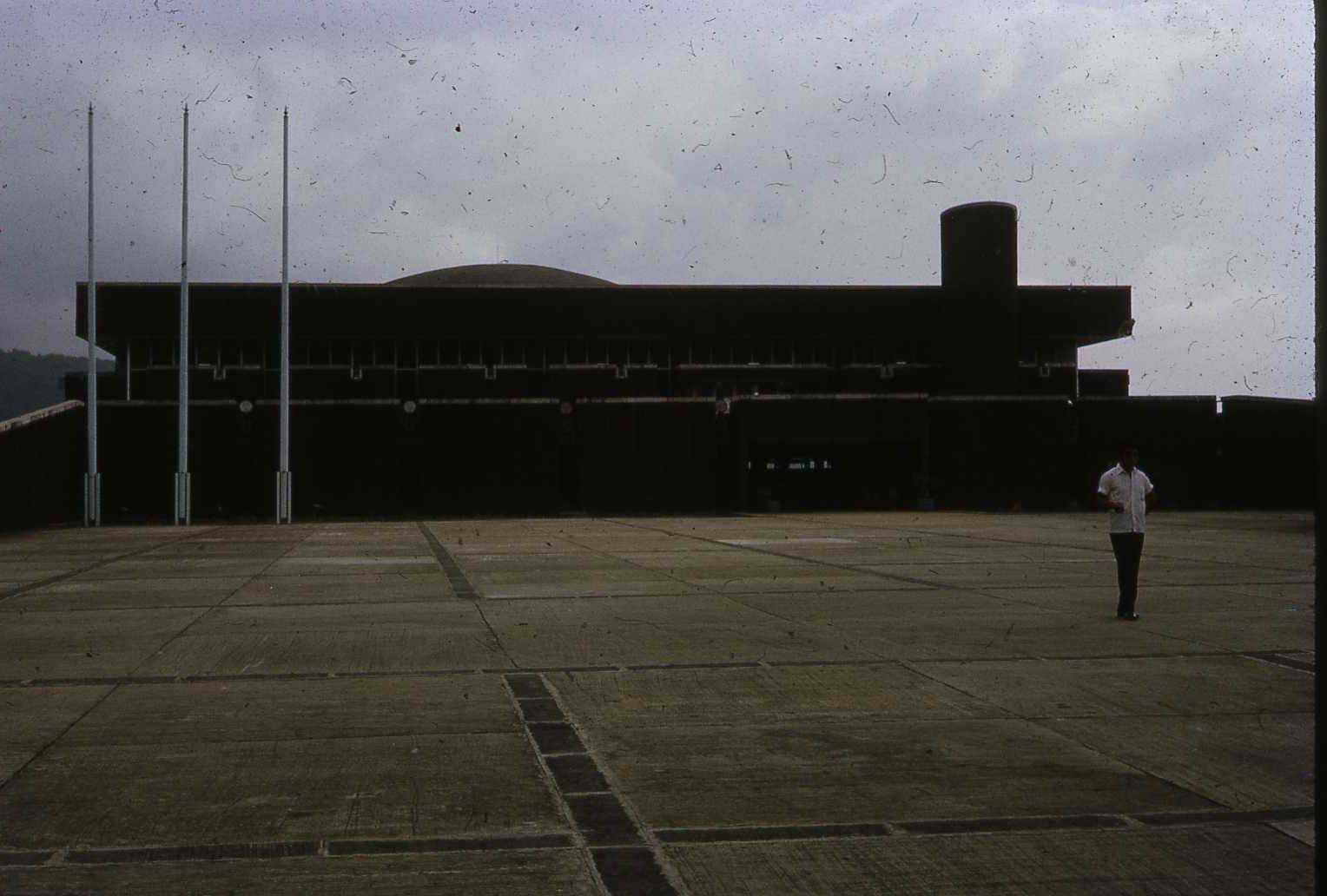
Sierra Leone House of Parliament

Following the 1967 Parliamentary elections, Mohamed Forna was elected to the Sierra Leone Parliament in 1967 as an APC MP for the Tonkolili West Constituency. He was subsequently appointed as the youngest ever Minister of Finance in 1968.

Following his resignation as Minister of Finance in 1970, Forna formed the United Democratic Party (UDP) to challenge the APC government under Siaka Stevens.

== Political persecution and execution ==
After his resignation from the Ministry of Finance, Mohamed Forna was politically persecuted by the administration of Siaka Stevens.

Following an attempted coup by John Bangura, a brigadier in the Sierra Leone military, the Siaka Stevens administration clamped down on perceived political dissidence. Mohamed Forna was among fourteen Sierra Leoneans arrested for the attempted coup. Forna, alongside others, were put on trial, which was presided over by Justice Marcus-Cole.

Forna, alongside thirteen other Sierra Leoneans were convicted of alleged treason and sentenced to death. Forna was executed on 19 July 1975 at Pademba Road Prison.
