= Nectar in a Sieve =

1954 novel by Kamala Markandaya

- First edition (US)
- Author: Kamala Markandaya
- Language: English
- Genre: Semi-autobiographical
- Publisher: John Day Company (US); Putnam (UK)
- Publication date: 1954
- Publication place: India
- Media type: print
- Pages: 255
- OCLC: 47948467
- Dewey Decimal: 823/.914 21
- LC Class: PR9499.3.M367 N43 2002

Nectar in a Sieve is a 1954 novel by Kamala Markandaya. The book is set in India during a period of intense urban development and is the chronicle of the marriage between Rukmani, youngest daughter of a village headman, and Nathan, a tenant farmer. The story is told in the first person by Rukmani, beginning from her arranged marriage to Nathan at the age of 12 to his death many years later.

== Title ==
The title of the novel is taken from the 1825 poem "Work Without Hope", by Samuel Taylor Coleridge. An excerpt from the poem is the epigraph of the novel:

Work without hope draws nectar in a sieve,
And hope without an object cannot live.

In the novel, Rukmani comments, "Change I had known before, and it had been gradual. But the change that now came into my life, into all our lives, blasting its way into our village, seemed wrought in the twinkling of an eye."

== Plot introduction ==
Rukmani and Nathan love each other and their marriage begins in relative peace and plenty. When a large tannery is built in the neighboring village, it begins insidiously destroying their lives. As the tannery grows larger and more prosperous, Rukmani and Nathan struggle to feed their children and to pay the rent on the land that gives them life. Although matters continue to worsen, they quietly resign themselves to ever-increasing hardships—flood, famine, even death—and cling to their hopes for a better future.

Dr. Kennington, or "Kenny", an itinerant English doctor, is an important presence in the novel. Although Rukmani's fatalistic attitude toward hardship exasperates him, he feels compassion for her and helps her when he can. At the end, Rukmani goes to live with her youngest son, now a doctor at the hospital Kenny has built.

Throughout the novel, Rukmani is faced with struggle after struggle with no indication that her circumstances will improve. Each time her situation worsens, she endures quietly, holding on to the hope that things will soon be better.

== Plot summary ==
Rukmani, an old woman, reflects on her life. The educated daughter of a village headman fallen on hard times, she is married at the age of 12 to Nathan, a tenant farmer. Nathan treats her with kindness and respect as she learns the chores her new life requires. Within a year they have a beautiful daughter, Ira, and good rice harvests. During the next six years, Rukmani does not conceive. Troubled that she cannot produce a son for Nathan, Rukmani visits her ill mother and there meets Kenny, a foreign doctor. He treats her infertility without Nathan's knowledge. In quick succession, Rukmani bears five sons. With each birth, however, the family has a little less to eat. When a tannery is built nearby, unpleasant changes come to village life. Rukmani's two oldest sons eventually work there. They help the family a great deal with their wages but are eventually dismissed for being ringleaders in a labor strike.

The year they arrange a good marriage for Ira, monsoon rains destroy their crops. Rukmani sacrifices her savings to buy food for the family. Ira's husband returns Ira to her parents’ home because she is barren. Again Rukmani turns to Kenny without her husband's knowledge, this time to help Ira conceive. His treatments are too late, however, since Ira's husband has taken another woman. Rukmani becomes pregnant again and bears her last son, Kuti. Caring for Kuti lifts Ira out of her depression and despair until the crops fail from drought and the family once again goes hungry. They sell most of their possessions just to pay half of what they owe the landowner for their lease. Reduced to foraging for roots and leaves, the family begins to weaken and starve. Kenny secures a servant's position in the city for Rukmani's third son. Rukmani's fourth son is killed stealing a calfskin from the tannery. Kuti suffers the most from hunger, and Ira prostitutes herself to feed him. Despite her efforts, he dies. A good rice harvest arrives too late to save Rukmani's sons.

Kenny returns from one of his long absences with money raised to build a hospital in the village. He offers to train Rukmani's remaining son, Selvam, as his assistant. Some villagers speculate that Kenny is kind to Rukmani because they have an illicit relationship. Kunthi, a neighborhood wife who became a prostitute, spreads this rumor out of spite. When they were both young, Nathan fathered Kunthi's two sons. Kunthi uses this as leverage over them until Rukmani learns the truth and forgives Nathan. Now, as Nathan nears fifty, he has no sons left to work the land. He suffers from rheumatism and debilitating fevers. Rukmani and Ira try to help, but they are not strong enough. Ira has a baby to care for, an albino boy conceived in prostitution but loved nonetheless. The family experiences its greatest loss when the land agent tells Nathan and Rukmani their land has been sold to the despised tannery. No one else will lease land to a man as old and ill as Nathan, and Rukmani and Nathan must leave their home of 30 years to live with to their son Murugan in the city. They leave Ira and their grandchild under Selvam's care.

Their possessions reduced to the few bundles they carry, Nathan and Rukmani try to find Murugan in the city. They rest one night at a temple, where thieves steal their bundles and money. A leprous street urchin named Puli helps them find the home of Kenny's doctor friend. They learn that Murugan has not worked there for the past two years and that he left the position for better wages at the Collector's house. At the Collector's, Murugan's wife informs them that Murugan has deserted her. Her older boy, their grandson, is thin with hunger. Her starving baby is too little to be Murugan's son. Rukmani sees that she and Nathan cannot impose upon their daughter-in-law. They return to the temple, where food is distributed each night to the destitute.

Rukmani and Nathan dream of home but have no means to make the trip. Rukmani tries to get work as a letter reader but earns only enough to buy rice cakes. Puli takes them to a stone quarry where there is better-paying work. He helps them learn to break stones, and they come to rely on him. They entrust him with their earnings, and, as they save, they begin to hope. One evening, Rukmani splurges on extra food and toys for Puli and her grandson. When she returns to Nathan at the temple, she expects him to be angry, but instead he is violently ill. During a week of monsoon rains, Nathan continues to work in the quarry despite his fevers and chills. One evening, after she gets paid, Rukmani begins to plan for a cart to take them home. Hurrying to catch up with Nathan, she finds him collapsed in the mud in the street. Kind strangers help carry him to the temple, where he dies in her arms after reminding her of their happiness together. After his death, Rukmani rashly promises Puli his health if he returns to the country with her, a promise Kenny and Selvam will help her keep. She introduces Puli to Selvam and Ira as the son she and Nathan adopted while they were away. Demonstrating hope and compassion, Ira hastens to prepare a meal for Puli, and Selvam promises his mother they will manage.
