= Ancestor Stones =

2006 novel by Aminatta Forna

- First edition (UK)
- Author: Aminatta Forna
- Language: English
- Published: 2006
- Publisher: Bloomsbury (UK); Atlantic Monthly Press (US)
- Publication place: Scotland
- Media type: Print (Hardback)
- Pages: 317
- ISBN: 9780747584797
- OCLC: 65203382

Ancestor Stones (2006) is a novel by British writer Aminatta Forna about the experiences of four women in a polygamous family in West Africa.

== Reception ==
Uzodinma Iweala of The New York Times, reviewing Ancestor Stones, "wanted to know more: how the characters feel about one another, not just how they feel about the chaotic events they’re describing." Bernardine Evaristo, writing in The Guardian, described this book to be "a wonderfully ambitious novel written from the inside" and concluded "This is her [Forna's] first novel, but it is too sophisticated to read like one."

Ancestor Stones has also been reviewed by Booklist, Choice Reviews, Library Journal, Publishers Weekly, Kirkus Reviews, African Business, Entertainment Weekly, and The New Yorker.

== Awards ==
- 2007 Hurston/Wright Legacy Award Debut Fiction - winner
- 2008 LiBeraturpreis - winner
- 2010 Aidoo-Snyder Book Award - winner (best creative work)
