= The Hired Man (Forna novel) =

2013 novel by Aminatta Forna

- First edition
- Author: Aminatta Forna
- Language: English
- Genre: Fiction
- Published: 2013
- Publisher: Bloomsbury
- Publication place: Scotland
- Media type: Print (Hardback)
- Pages: 304
- ISBN: 9781408817667
- OCLC: 837498131
- Preceded by: The Memory of Love
- Followed by: Happiness

The Hired Man (2013) is a novel by Scottish-Sierra Leonean writer Aminatta Forna about an Englishwoman, Laura, and her two children who renovate a farmhouse in Croatia with the help of local handyman, Duro. Through their interaction, she reveals and explores local history, including effects of the Yugoslav Wars.

== Reception ==
The Guardian's review noted: "The novel is a continuation of Forna's overriding theme; the gradual accretion of small, seemingly insignificant acts of betrayal that eventually find expression in full-scale horror. In that respect, she remains committed to a single story; though The Hired Man triumphantly proves that the story need not always remain the same."

The Independent's reviewer wrote: "The pacing of this novel is stunning. After an edgy beginning, it blooms into joyousness halfway through when the mosaic is restored, and then the cruelty begins to flow."

The Boston Globe described it as "fiercely mournful", concluding: "Not since 'Remains of the Day' has an author so skillfully revealed the way history's layers are often invisible to all but its participants, who do what they must to survive. Skills acquired in war do, in fact, translate well to subsistence living. In this gorgeous novel, Aminatta Forna shows what doesn't translate, however, and what makes war's aftermath so long, melancholy, and deadly."

The Hired Man has also been reviewed by The Scotsman, The New Zealand Herald, the San Francisco Chronicle, the Star Tribune, The Vienna Review, and The Hindu.
