= Possession (Markandaya novel) =

1963 English-language novel by Kamala Markandaya

- First edition
- Author: Kamala Markandaya
- Language: English
- Publisher: John Day Company (US); Putnam (UK)
- Publication date: 1963
- Publication place: India
- Media type: print
- Pages: 249
- OCLC: 1880201

Possession: a novel is a 1963 English-language novel by Kamala Markandaya.

== Plot summary ==
The action of Possession begins around the year 1949, and continues through the 1950s and early 1960s. An Englishwoman, Lady Caroline Bell, discovers Valmiki, a teenage goatherd who has been painting in local caves, in a village in South India. Snatching Valmiki from the protection of an elderly local swami, she brings him back to London as an exotic pet artist. Jealously guarding Valmiki's attachment to her, Lady Bell cannot stop him eventually returning to India after the suicide of Ellie, a concentration camp survivor whom Valmiki paints and makes pregnant. She follows him back to India, to find him spiritually reattached to the swami and once again painting in the caves around his village.

The "possession" of the book's title refers to the woman's desire to own the man and the man's possession by a foreign identity with new values.
