= Gravel Heart =

2017 novel by Abdulrazak Gurnah

- First edition
- Author: Abdulrazak Gurnah
- Publisher: Bloomsbury
- Publication date: 1 August 2017
- Pages: 272
- ISBN: 978-1-63286-813-8
- Preceded by: The Last Gift
- Followed by: Afterlives

Gravel Heart is a 2017 novel by Abdulrazak Gurnah. It is Gurnah's ninth novel and was first published by Bloomsbury Publishing on 1 August 2017. The story is set in the late 20th century and follows Salim, who moves from Zanzibar to the United Kingdom, as he reflects on his parents' separation. The title originates from a phrase used in Shakespeare's play Measure for Measure.

The book received positive reviews from critics. Suzi Feay, writing for the Financial Times, described it as "elegantly written and unsparingly sad", and applauded its examination of British colonialism. In a review for The Times Literary Supplement, Tadzio Koelb praised the novel's final section and Gurnah's storytelling.
