= Memory of Departure =

1987 novel by Abdulrazak Gurnah

- Author: Abdulrazak Gurnah
- Language: English
- Publisher: Jonathan Cape
- Publication date: 1987
- Publication place: UK
- Pages: 160
- Followed by: Pilgrims Way

Memory of Departure is a novel by Abdulrazak Gurnah, first published in 1987 by Jonathan Cape in the United Kingdom. It is Gurnah's first novel. It follows a Muslim man in an unnamed African country who seeks to be educated abroad.

In a review for The New York Times, Richard E. Nicholls praised the novel as "fierce" and "vivid". Kirkus referred to the novel as "artfully spare" and indicated an expectation that "more good things" were to be written by Gurnah. In a 2022 article about Gurnah and his work, published by The New Yorker, Julian Lucas wrote that the novel "established a pattern that Gurnah continued to refine" through his subsequent work of "a ceaseless shuttling between the claustrophobia of home and the loneliness of exile".
