= The Adoption Papers =

1991 Jackie Kay poetry collection

First edition

The Adoption Papers is the debut poetry collection by the Scottish poet Jackie Kay. It was published in 1991 by Bloodaxe Books. It won the Forward Prize for best first collection.

The poems are autobiographical and relate Kay's adoption from three different perspectives, from that of her own, her mother's and her birth mother.

Writing in Poetry Review, Alastair Niven wrote The Adoption Papers " ... could well become a key work of feminism in action" and was "a wonderfully spirited, tender and crafted contribution to Scottish writing, to black writing, and to the poetry of our time. It is a work of the utmost generosity and truth". Elizabeth Burns wrote in The Scotsman that the poems in the collection were " ... brave, honest, unsentimental" and "can be loud with pain and rage, but sometimes it's as though [Kay] whispers too, entering dreams, allowing herself a delicate imagery ... This book is full of fresh, remarkable poetry; its rhythms sing from the page, demanding to be heard".

The collection was included in the Big Jubilee Read to celebrate the Platinum Jubilee of Elizabeth II in 2022.
