= Cockersdale (band) =

English folk music group

Cockersdale is a folk music singing group from West Yorkshire, England, founded by Keith Marsden of Morley (died 1991) and revived after his death.

Their albums include Doin' the Manch, recorded in 1988 and later reissued as a CD. The title song, written by Keith Marsden, refers to a pub crawl round the 27 or 28 pubs in Manchester Road, Bradford: "The Manch".
