= Admiring Silence =

1996 novel by Abdulrazak Gurnah

- Author: Abdulrazak Gurnah
- Publisher: The New Press
- Publication date: 1 November 1996
- Pages: 224
- ISBN: 1-56584-349-5
- Preceded by: Paradise
- Followed by: By the Sea

Admiring Silence is a 1996 novel by Abdulrazak Gurnah. It is Gurnah's fifth novel and was first published by The New Press on 1 November 1996.

The plot follows an unnamed Zanzibari man living in England, after fleeing there in the early 1960s. In England he becomes a teacher and raises a daughter with his white English lover. After his 20-year exile from his homeland, the narrator travels back to Zanzibar to reflect on his past and finds a place that is no longer home.

The book received positive reviews from critics. A reviewer for Kirkus Reviews described it as a "beautifully calibrated story of a wrenching search for home" and praised its themes of immigration and colonialism. Publishers Weekly applauded Gurnah's examination of cultural issues and the narrator's characterization.
