= Summer Lightning (short story collection) =

1986 Olive Senior short story collection

- Author: Olive Senior
- Publisher: Longman
- Publication date: 1986
- Awards: Commonwealth Writer's Prize (1987); Big Jubilee Read (2022)
- ISBN: 978-0582786271

Summer Lightning and other stories is a 1986 collection of short stories by Jamaican writer Olive Senior. It won the 1987 Commonwealth Writers' Prize and was selected for the 2022 Big Jubilee Read, a list of 70 titles by Commonwealth writers.

In A History of Literature in the Caribbean: English- and Dutch-speaking countries, the stories are described as "scintillating evocations of life in rural Jamaica". Booker Prize winner Marlon James included it in his "My 10 Favorite Books" in a 2016 New York Times piece, saying "The entire future of Caribbean prose is mapped out in this collection of stories, and I don't know a single Caribbean writer who doesn't reread it often".

Senior has said of this book: "I believe Summer Lightning to be a true expression of everyday life in that part of the world I describe, i.e., deep rural Jamaica, in terms of behaviours, beliefs, practices narrated and language used".

== Story titles ==
The stories in the book are:

- "Summer Lightning"
- "Love Orange"
- "Country of the One Eye God"
- "Ascot"
- "Bright Thursdays"
- "Real Old Time T'ing"
- "Do Angels Wear Brassieres?"
- "Confirmation Day"
- "The Boy Who Loved Ice Cream"
- "Ballad"
