= Afterlives =

2020 novel by Abdulrazak Gurnah

- First edition
- Author: Abdulrazak Gurnah
- Genre: Historical fiction
- Publisher: Bloomsbury
- Publication date: 17 September 2020
- Pages: 288
- ISBN: 978-1-5266-1585-5
- Preceded by: Gravel Heart

Afterlives is a 2020 work of historical fiction by the Nobel Prize-winning Zanzibar-born British author Abdulrazak Gurnah. It was first published by Bloomsbury Publishing on 17 September 2020. Set mainly in the first half of the 20th century, the plot follows four protagonists living in an unnamed town on the Swahili coast of what is now Tanzania from the time of German colonial rule until a few years after independence. It was shortlisted for the Orwell Prize of Political Fiction.

== Critical reception ==
David Pilling of the Financial Times described it as a "book of quiet beauty and tragedy". In a review for The Guardian, Maaza Mengiste praised its narrative details of colonialism and depiction of psychologically complicated relationships, though she felt that the ending was rushed. Referring to the "deliberate exclusion of an African perspective" from historical archives, she concludes: "In Afterlives, he considers the generational effects of colonialism and war, and asks us to consider what remains in the aftermath of so much devastation."

It was selected for The Washington Post's "10 Best Books of 2022" list.
