= The Memory of Love =

2010 novel by Aminatta Forna

- First edition (UK)
- Author: Aminatta Forna
- Language: English
- Genre: Fiction
- Published: 2010 (Bloomsbury)
- Publication place: Scotland
- Media type: Print (Hardback)
- Pages: 464
- ISBN: 9781408808139
- OCLC: 851988400

The Memory of Love is a 2010 novel by Aminatta Forna about the experiences of three men in Sierra Leone. In 2022, it was included on the "Big Jubilee Read" list of 70 books by Commonwealth authors, selected to celebrate the Platinum Jubilee of Elizabeth II.

== Plot summary ==
Set amidst the dawn of peace in Sierra Leone after a decade-long civil war, the lives of Elias Cole, Adrian Lockheart, and Kai Mansaray intersect in a city hospital as they struggle with their turbulent pasts. Elias, a retired history professor, reveals his secrets to Dr. Adrian Lockheart, while memories of the late 1960s shape his fate. Adrian, striving to heal war-traumatized minds, faces challenges as he befriends Kai, an orthopedic surgeon haunted by his own demons. As their stories unfold, old acquaintances resurface, secrets unravel, and relationships are tested, culminating in revelations and attempts at redemption amidst the lingering shadows of the past. "The Memory of Love" intricately intertwines the lives of two generations of Africans, exploring themes of loss, forgiveness, and the enduring impact of history, ultimately delving into the essence of love itself.

== Setting ==
The book takes place in Sierra Leone, a country in West Africa. It begins in 2001, after a long civil war has ended, bringing peace to the country. Most of the story happens in a hospital in the capital city, Freetown. This hospital is where the lives of the main characters—Elias Cole, Adrian Lockheart, and Kai Mansaray—intersect.

== Reception ==
Maaza Mengiste wrote in The New York Times: "Forna's first work of fiction, 'Ancestor Stones,' was an accomplished collection of interconnected stories. 'The Memory of Love,' equally layered, gives us a stronger, more nuanced voice, a writer more willing to take risks with plot and character. ... She forces us to see past bland categorizations like 'postcolonial African literature,' showing that the world we inhabit reaches beyond borders and ripples out through generations. She reminds us that what matters most is that which keeps us grounded in the place of our choosing. And she writes to expose what remains after all the noise has faded: at the core of this novel is the brave and beating heart, at once vulnerable and determined, unwilling to let go of all it has ever loved." The Guardian reviewer found it "an ambitious and deeply researched novel".

The Memory of Love has also been reviewed by Booklist, BookPage Reviews, Publishers Weekly, Kirkus Reviews, The Daily Telegraph, and The Spectator.

== Awards ==
- 2011: Commonwealth Writers' Prize: Best Book - winner
- 2011: Warwick Prize - shortlist
- 2011: Women's Prize for Fiction - shortlist
- 2012: International Dublin Literary Award - shortlist
