= Paradise (Gurnah novel) =

1994 historical novel by Abdulrazak Gurnah

- First edition
- Author: Abdulrazak Gurnah
- Language: English
- Publisher: Hamish Hamilton
- Publication date: 1994
- Publication place: United Kingdom
- Media type: Print (hardcover, paperback)
- Pages: 256
- ISBN: 9780747573999
- Preceded by: Dottie
- Followed by: Admiring Silence

Paradise is a historical novel by the Nobel Prize-winning Zanzibar-born British writer Abdulrazak Gurnah, first published in 1994 by Hamish Hamilton in London. The novel was nominated for both the Booker Prize and the Whitbread Prize for Fiction.

== Plot ==
The novel follows the story of Yusuf, a boy born in the fictional town of Kawa in Tanzania at the turn of the 20th century. Yusuf's father is a hotelier and is in debt to a rich and powerful Arab merchant named Aziz. Early in the story Yusuf is pawned in exchange for his father's owed debt to Aziz and must work as an unpaid servant for the merchant in his store. Yusuf joins Aziz's caravan as they travel into the interior to the lands west of Lake Tanganyika. Here, Aziz's caravan of traders meets hostility from local tribes, wild animals and difficult terrain. Eventually they return home, and Yusuf, now a young man, is once more left behind while Aziz travels. Aziz's wife, who is mentally and physically ill, believes that Yusuf can cure her, and asks him to sit with her many evenings. Yusuf does so because he has fallen in love with Aziz's second, younger wife, who translates for them. The older wife eventually accuses Yusuf of rape when he will not sleep with her.

Aziz returns before a mob can attack Yusuf, and Yusuf implicitly pledge him lifelong devotion. Shortly thereafter, German soldiers sweep into the village forcibly conscripting African men as soldiers for World War I. Yusuf hides and escapes the army initially, but he is disgusted with his acquiescence in servitude to Aziz, and suddenly runs after the Germans, apparently seeking to be conscripted himself.

== Literary genealogy ==
=== Heart of Darkness ===
Johan Jacobs (Note: As of 2022, professor emeritus at the University of KwaZulu-Natal. In the bibliography, Deandrea gives his first name as Johan.) claims that Gurnah is writing back to Joseph Conrad's 1902 novel Heart of Darkness. In Aziz's easterly journey to the Congo, Jacobs says that Gurnah is challenging the dominant Western images of the Congo at the turn of the twentieth century that continue to pervade the popular imagination. James Hodapp explicitly rejected this interpretation,calling Jacobs's approach "Eurocentric" and saying that he was "ignoring non-European influences almost entirely".

=== Early Swahili prose ===
In one scene, Yusuf is serving a group of visitors and listening to their stories in the evening. One visitor relates to the incredulous audience that his uncle travelled to St. Petersburg in the "country of the Rusi", where "the sun shone until midnight" and where the people "were not civilized". This "clearly alludes" to Salim bin Abakari's late 19th-century travel memoir Safari Yangu ya Urusi na ya Siberia (My Journey to Russia and Siberia), written in the late 19th century.

== Literary reception ==
The book was well received on publication. Writing in The Independent, Anita Mason described the novel as "many-layered, violent, beautiful and strange".

In 2022, Paradise was included on the "Big Jubilee Read" list of 70 books by Commonwealth authors, selected to celebrate the Platinum Jubilee of Elizabeth II.

== Translation ==
Following the receipt of the Nobel Prize, Paradise was Gurnah's first book to be translated to Swahili, the language spoken in Tanzania. The translation, titled Peponi, was done by Ida Hadjivayanis, a senior lecturer at the School of Oriental and African Studies of the University of London in 2022. It was published by Mkuki na Nyota, an independent publishing house in Dar es Salaam founded by Walter Bgoya.

== Publication history ==
- 1994, UK, Hamish Hamilton, Hardback
- 2004, UK, Bloomsbury Books, Paperback
