= Jing-Jing Lee =

Singaporean writer (born 1985)

Jing-Jing Lee MSt
- Born: Li Jingjing; 1985 (age 40–41); Singapore
- Education: National University of Singapore; Oxford University
- Occupations: Novelist, port, short story writer
- Spouse: Marco
- Children: 1
- Writing career
- Language: English
- Years active: 2009 – present
- Notable work: How We Disappeared

Chinese name
- Chinese: 李晶晶
Transcriptions
Standard Mandarin
- Hanyu Pinyin: Lǐ Jīngjīng
- IPA: [lì tɕíŋ.tɕíŋ]
- Website: jingjinglee.com

Jing-Jing Lee (born 1985) is a Singaporean author who writes in the English language; her best-known work is the novel How We Disappeared (2019).

== Early life and education ==
Lee was born in Singapore in 1985 and grew up speaking Mandarin. She was not read to as a child, only discovering books at school.

She attended The Chinese High School and then went to the National University of Singapore, where she studied social science and business before dropping out. She later completed a MSt in creative writing at the University of Oxford in England.

== Career ==
Lee published a book of short stories, If I Could Tell You, in 2013, and a poetry collection And Other Rivers in 2015.

Her debut novel, How We Disappeared, was published in 2019 and was longlisted for the Women's Prize for Fiction; it was included in the Big Jubilee Read, a list of 70 novels by Commonwealth authors created to mark the Platinum Jubilee of Queen Elizabeth II.

== Selected publications ==
=== Short-story collections ===
- If I Could Tell You (2013)

=== Novels ===
- How We Disappeared (2019)

=== Poetry ===
- And Other Rivers (2015)

== Personal life ==
Lee lives in Amsterdam with her husband, Marco, and their son.
