= Jingjing Li =

Materials scientist

Jingjing Li is a Chinese-American materials scientist whose research concerns advanced manufacturing processes for joining dissimilar lightweight materials, and the effects of processing and microstructure on the performance of composite materials over time. She is a professor at Pennsylvania State University, in the Harold and Inge Marcus Department of Industrial and Manufacturing Engineering, where she heads the Materials Processing and Characterization Laboratory.

== Education and career ==
Li has a bachelor's degree from Beihang University, and a master's degree from Tsinghua University, in materials science and engineering. She continued her graduate studies at the University of Michigan, where she received a second master's degree in statistics, and completed her Ph.D. in mechanical engineering, in 2011.

She became a member of the mechanical engineering department at the University of Hawaiʻi at Mānoa, starting in 2011, before moving to Pennsylvania State University in 2016. At Penn State, she held the title of William and Wendy Korb Early Career Professor as an associate professor, before being promoted to full professor in 2022.

== Recognition ==
Li received a National Science Foundation CAREER Award in 2016. She was the 2019 recipient of the Chao and Trigger Young Manufacturing Engineer Award of the American Society of Mechanical Engineers (ASME). In 2022 she was named as an ASME Fellow.
