= Caradog Prichard =

Welsh poet (1904–1980)

Caradog Prichard (3 November 1904 – 25 February 1980) was a Welsh poet and novelist writing in Welsh. His daughter, Mari Prichard, was married to the late Humphrey Carpenter.

Caradog Prichard was born and grew up in the Gwynedd slate-quarrying town of Bethesda, in north-west Wales. His father died when he was a baby, and his mother suffered from mental illness. Prichard began his career as a journalist with Welsh language newspapers in Caernarfon, Llanrwst and Cardiff, before moving to London, where he spent much of his life.

== Un Nos Ola Leuad ==
His best-known work is Un Nos Ola Leuad (1961), set in a mythologically subversive version of his native area. The novel was made into a film in 1991 by the Gaucho Company.

=== Translations of the novel ===
- Full Moon 1973 (English) partial translation by Menna Gallie (translated from Prichard's Welsh)
- Une nuit de pleine lune 1990 (French) (translated from Prichard's Welsh)
- One Moonlit Night 1995 (English) full translation by Philip Mitchell. (translated from Prichard's Welsh)
- Za úplnku (Czech) (translated from Philip Mitchell's English translation)
- Una noche de luna (Spanish) (translated from Philip Mitchell's English translation)
- In einer mondhellen Nacht (German) (translated from Philip Mitchell's English translation)
- Mia núhta me fengári (Greek) (translated from Philip Mitchell's English translation)
- In de maneschijn (Dutch) (translated from Philip Mitchell's English translation)
- En manelys nat (Danish) (translated from Philip Mitchell's English translation)
- Jedna księżycowa noc 2017 (Polish) translation from Welsh by Marta Listewnik

=== Radio broadcasts ===
Following the success of his English translation, Philip Mitchell was commissioned by the BBC to adapt the book for broadcast in English as a radio play and this was transmitted as 'One Moonlit Night' in Radio 4's 'Afternoon Play' series on 28 March 1996.

In June 2023 a dramatisation by Rhiannon Boyle was broadcast on BBC Radio 4, and a Welsh version broadcast on BBC Radio Cymru later in the month.

== Poetry and other works ==
In addition to Un Nos Ola Leuad, he also wrote a number of short stories, Y Genod yn Ein Bywyd (1964), and a striking semi-fictional autobiography, Afal Drwg Adda (1973). He had made his mark as a poet at an early age and was crowned Bard of the National Eisteddfod three years running between 1927 and 1929. He also won the chair at the Llanelli National Eisteddfod in 1962 for his poem Llef un yn Llefain. At their best his poems are as powerful and disturbing as Un Nos Ola Leuad. His published collections of verse are:

- Canu Cynnar (1937)
- Tantalus (1957)
- Llef Un yn Llefain (1963)

A full collected edition of his poems was published in 1979.
