= Kamala Markandaya =

British Indian novelist and journalist

- Born: Kamala Purnaiya; 23 June 1924; Mysore, Kingdom of Mysore, British India (now Mysuru, Karnataka, India)
- Died: 16 May 2004 (aged 79); London, England
- Education: Madras University
- Occupations: Novelist and journalist

Kamala Markandaya (23 June 1924 – 16 May 2004), pseudonym of Kamala Purnaiya, married name Kamala Taylor, was a British Indian novelist and journalist. She has been called "one of the most important Indian novelists writing in English".

== Life ==
=== Early life ===
Markandaya was born into an upper-middle-class Deshastha Madhva Brahmin family. A native of Mysore, India, Markandaya was a graduate of Madras University, and afterwards published several short stories in Indian newspapers. After India declared its independence, Markandaya moved to Britain, though she still labelled herself an Indian expatriate long afterwards. Kamala was a descendant of diwan Purnaiya and was fluent in Kannada and Marathi.

=== Career ===
She was well-known for writing about culture clash between Indian urban and rural societies, Markandaya's first published novel, Nectar in a Sieve (1954), was a bestseller and cited as an American Library Association Notable Book in 1955. Her other novels include Some Inner Fury (1955), A Silence of Desire (1960), Possession (1963), A Handful of Rice (1966), The Coffer Dams (1969), The Nowhere Man (1972), Two Virgins (1973), The Golden Honeycomb (1977), and Pleasure City (1982). Her last novel, Bombay Tiger, was published posthumously (2008) by her daughter Kim Oliver. Her First Published Novel's Title "Nectar in a Sieve" (1954) had been taken from S.T. Coleridge's Poem "Work without Hope" - "Work without Hope draws nectar in a sieve, And Hope without an object cannot live."

=== Death ===
Kamala Markandaya died aged 79 on 16 May 2004.

== Works ==
- Nectar in a Sieve, London: Putnam, New York: John Day, 1954
- Some Inner Fury, London: Putnam, 1955, New York: John Day, 1956
- A Silence of Desire, London: Putnam, New York: John Day, 1960
- Possession; a novel, London: Putnam, New York: John Day, 1963
- A Handful of Rice, London: Hamish Hamilton, New York: John Day, 1966
- The Coffer Dams, London: Hamilton, New York: John Day, 1969
- The Nowhere Man, New York: John Day, 1972, London: Allen Lane, 1973
- Two Virgins, New York: John Day, 1973, London: Chatto & Windus, 1974
- The Golden Honeycomb, London: Chatto & Windus, New York: Crowell, 1977
- Pleasure City, London: Chatto & Windus, 1982. Published in the United States under the title Shalimar, New York: Harper & Row, 1982
- Bombay Tiger, New Delhi: Penguin, 2008 (Posthumously published)

== Literary criticism ==
- Almeida, Rochelle. Originality and Imitation: Indianness in the Novels of Kamala Markandaya. Jaipur: Rawat Publications, 2000.
- Aror, Sudhir K. Multicultural Consciousness in the Novels of Kamala Markandaya. Authors press, 2011.
- Jha, Rekha. The Novels of Kamala Markandaya and Ruth Prawer Jhabvala: A Study in East-West Encounter. New Delhi: Prestige Books, 1990.
- Joseph, Margaret P. Kamala Markandaya, Indian Writers Series, N. Delhi: Arnold-Heinemann, 1980.
- Krishna Rao, A. V. The Indo-Anglian Novel and Changing Tradition: A Study of the Novels of Mulk Raj Anad, Kamala Markandaya, R.K. Narayan, Raja Rao, 1930–64. Mysore: 1972.
- Parameswaran, Uma. Kamala Markandaya. Jaipur: Rawat Publications, 2000.
- Shrivastava, Manish. "Conflicts of Sensibility in Kamala Markandaya's A Silence of Desire". Synthesis: Indian Journal of English Literature and Language. vol.1, no.1.
- Singh, Indu. "The Feminist Approach in Kamala Markandaya's Novels with Special Reference to Nectar in a Sieve", Synthesis: Indian Journal of English Literature and Language, vol. 1, no. 1.

== See also ==
- Indian writing in English
