= Aminatta Forna =

Scottish writer (born 1965)

Aminatta Forna OBE
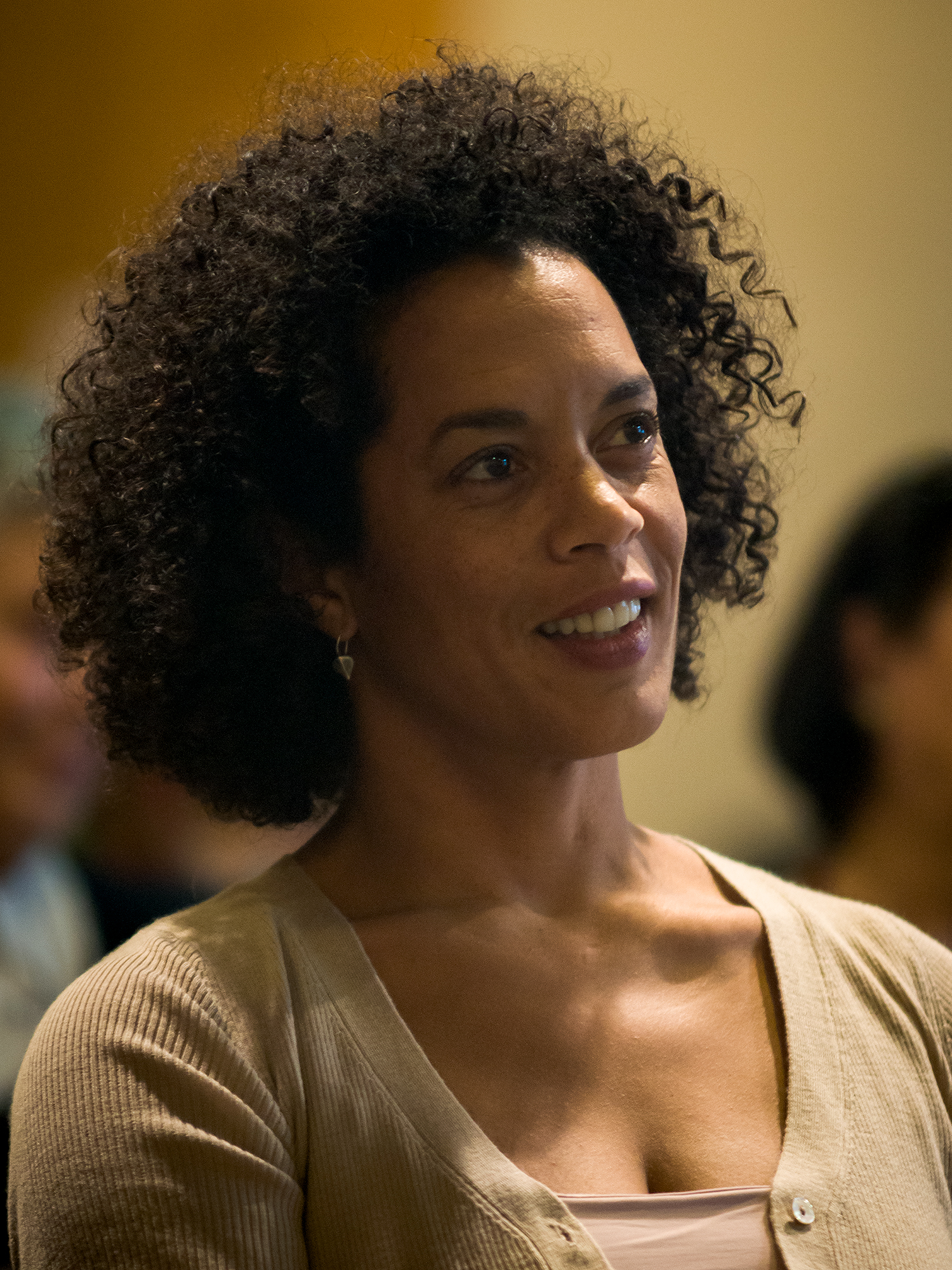
- Forna in Frankfurt am Main, 2008
- Born: 20 December 1965 (age 60); Bellshill, Lanarkshire, Scotland
- Education: University College London
- Occupations: Author, academic, commentator
- Spouse: Simon Westcott
- Writing career
- Notable works: The Devil That Danced on the Water: A Daughter's Quest (2003); Ancestor Stones (2006); The Memory of Love (2010); The Hired Man (2013); Happiness (2017); The Window Seat (2021)
- Notable awards: Commonwealth Writers' Prize Best Book Award 2011; 2014 Windham–Campbell Literature Prize (Fiction)
- Website: aminattaforna.com

Aminatta Forna OBE is a British writer of Scottish and Sierra Leonean ancestry. Her first book was a memoir, The Devil That Danced on the Water: A Daughter's Quest (2002). Since then she has written four novels: Ancestor Stones (2006), The Memory of Love (2010), The Hired Man (2013) and Happiness (2018). In 2021 she published a collection of essays, The Window Seat: Notes from a Life in Motion. (2021), which was a new genre for her.

She has been widely praised and received numerous awards, in addition to being nominated for others. Her novel The Memory of Love was awarded the Commonwealth Writers' Prize for "Best Book" in 2011, and was shortlisted for the Orange Prize for Fiction.

Forna is Professor of Creative Writing at Bath Spa University. She was the Sterling Brown ’22 Visiting Professor of Africana Studies at Williams College in Williamstown, Massachusetts.

Since 2012 she has been Director and Lannan Foundation Chair of Poetics of the Lannan Center for Poetics and Social Practice at Georgetown University in Washington, DC.

Forna was among eight writers from seven countries to win the 2014 Windham–Campbell Literature Prize (fiction).

Forna was appointed Officer of the Order of the British Empire (OBE) in the 2017 New Year Honours for services to literature.

Forna is a fellow of the Royal Society of Literature, and sits on the advisory committee for the Royal Literary Fund and the Caine Prize for African Writing. She has served as a judge on several high-profile prize panels, including the 2017 Baileys Women's Prize for Fiction. She continues to champion the work of up-and-coming diverse authors.

In March 2019, Forna's Happiness was shortlisted for the European Literature Prize. In April 2019 it was shortlisted for the Royal Society of Literature (RSL) Ondaatje Prize and for the Jhalak Prize

== Background ==
Aminatta Forna was born in 1965 in Bellshill, Lanarkshire, Scotland, near Glasgow, the third child of Mohamed Sorie Forna, a Sierra Leonean who had completed his medical training in Scotland and had a practice, and his wife Maureen Christison, who is Scottish.

When Forna was six months old, the family travelled to Sierra Leone, where they lived while Forna's father worked in Freetown as a physician and government finance minister. With her family, Forna lived in nine homes during six years, also spending time as a child in Iran, Thailand and Zambia. Her parents divorced and her mother remarried, returning to the UK.

After their father gained custody and returned with them to Sierra Leone, the children saw little of their mother.

Mohamed Forna became more deeply involved in politics and entered government after the country achieved independence in 1961, serving as finance minister and working to aid developing countries. He resigned after becoming discouraged by what he said was a growth in political violence and corruption. But political tensions were rising and he was arrested by the secret police. He was imprisoned between 1970 and 1973; Amnesty International designated him as a Prisoner of Conscience. In 1975 Forna's father was executed by hanging, on charges of treason.

While living in Sierra Leone, Forna's father married again, and the children called their stepmother "Auntie Yabome". As conspiracy endangered his life, Yabome smuggled the children from Freetown to England, and made a life for them there. Forna was ten years old when her father was killed. She finished school in England and studied law at University College London.

== Early career ==
Between 1989 and 1999, Forna worked for the BBC, both in radio and television. She worked as a reporter and also made documentaries in the spheres of arts and politics. She is known for her Africa documentaries: Through African Eyes (1995), the first of which she made at the BBC. Others include Africa Unmasked (2002) and The Lost Libraries of Timbuktu (2009), also made for BBC.

In 2013 she assumed a post as Professor of Creative Writing at Bath Spa University.

Forna is a board member of the Royal National Theatre and was a judge for the Man Booker International Prize 2013.

Forna founded The Rogbonko Village Project, a charity begun as an initiative to build a school in a village in Sierra Leone.

Forna is married to Simon Westcott, a furniture designer. As of 2013, they lived in south-east London.

In 2021 she published a collection of essays, She said in an interview that she had been encouraged by her time at Georgetown University, as there was considerable interest in the United States in the essay form.

== Writing ==
Forna's work, both fiction and non-fiction, is concerned with the prelude and aftermath to war, memory, and the conflict between private narratives and official histories. She explores how the gradual accretion of small, seemingly insignificant acts of betrayal find expression in full-scale horror. In her fiction she employs multiple voices and shifting timelines.

=== Mother of All Myths ===
Mother of All Myths is a nonfiction work published in 1998. It explores the contemporary culture and myths surrounding motherhood.

=== The Devil that Danced on the Water ===
The Devil that Danced on the Water (2002), Forna's second book, received wide critical acclaim across the UK and the U.S. Broadcast on BBC Radio, it was a runner-up for the UK's Samuel Johnson Prize for non-fiction.

Forna had returned to Sierra Leone to try to clear her father's name. With her stepmother's cooperation, she learned more about the conspiracy related to her father's death, and interviewed many people who had testified against him. Her childhood and this investigation, or quest, are the subject of her memoir.

These events contributed to her continued writing about the theme of psychological trauma in many of her subsequent novels. Her memoir expresses her anger and sorrow about her father's arrest, imprisonment and political execution for supposed treason.

She wrote: "It was as though this terrible knowledge, of the lies and the manipulation, the greed and the corruption, the fear and violence had been with me for ever. So this is innocence lost, what it feels like. The country had changed, I had changed - as for the past, it was irrevocably altered."

=== Ancestor Stones ===
Ancestor Stones, Forna's third book and first novel, won the Hurston/Wright Legacy Award for debut fiction in the U.S. and the LiBeraturpreis in Germany. It was nominated for the International Dublin Literary Award.

The Washington Post selected Ancestor Stones as one of the most important books of 2006. In 2007, Forna was ranked by Vanity Fair magazine as one of Africa's best new writers.

=== The Memory of Love ===
The Memory of Love, winner of the Commonwealth Writers' Prize Best Book Award 2011, was described by the judges as "a bold, deeply moving and accomplished novel" and Forna as "among the most talented writers in literature today"; The Memory of Love was also shortlisted for the International Dublin Literary Award 2012, the Orange Prize for Fiction 2011 and the Warwick Prize for Writing.

The book was the subject of the BBC Radio 4 programme Bookclub, in discussion between Forna and James Naughtie.

=== Girl Rising ===
Forna was one of 10 writers contributing to the film 10x10 Girl Rising (2012).

The film tells the stories of 10 girls in 10 developing countries. The girls' stories are written by 10 acclaimed writers and narrated by 10 world-class actresses, including Meryl Streep, Anne Hathaway, Freida Pinto and Cate Blanchett. The film premiered at Sundance Film Festival in January 2013.

Forna wrote about Mariama, an intelligent woman who studies engineering in university and strives to extend the opportunity of education to young girls. Her role models are also advocates of education, including Sia Koroma, the First Lady of Sierra Leone.

=== The Hired Man ===
The Hired Man, Forna's third novel, was published in the UK in March 2013.

Critics praised Forna's forensic research and ability to evoke atmosphere, place, pacing, precision, powerful emotions, characterisations, and atmosphere.

In the United States The Boston Globe said that "not since The Remains of the Day has an author so skilfully revealed the way history's layers are often invisible to all but its participants, who do what they must to survive".

=== Happiness ===
Happiness, Forna's fourth novel, was published in the U.S. in March 2018, and in the UK in April 2018. It explores themes of love, trauma, migration and belonging, the conflict between nature and civilisation, and how multi-layered experiences can grow resilience. Psychiatrist Dr. Attila Asara of Ghana and Jean Turane of America meet by chance and grow from their newfound relationship. Asara suggests that people try to live a "wrinkle-free" life, although he argues that one must live in discomfort to live a full life. Asara compares trauma survivors and Turane's foxes: the foxes try to outsmart humans while trauma survivors outsmart the damage they went through to try to maintain a normal life.

Happiness has been featured on several recommended reading lists, including BBC Culture, The Root, The Guardian, The Irish Times, and The i Paper.

The Star Tribune described Happiness as "a tightly focused two-hander". The Financial Times review of Happiness said: "Forna is a risk-taker, a writer who doesn't hold back from tackling big themes". The Washington Post described Forna as a "subtle and knowing" writer able to fold "weighty matter into her buoyant creation with a sublimely delicate touch". The Seattle Times wrote: "Forna's prose is precise ... stunning in its clarity".

Kirkus Reviews, featuring the author on its cover, wrote: "Low-key yet piercingly empathetic, Forna's latest explores instinct, resilience, and the complexity of human coexistence, reaffirming her reputation for exceptional ability and perspective." The Sunday Times review notes: "Forna circles ... Her path is never straight, she doubles back, crisscrosses ... she approaches the thought from elliptical angles, bringing moments of startling clarity. This walk is never dull." The Observer's Alex Preston wrote of Happiness: "It is as if the author has privileged access into multiple spheres of existence, learning the secret languages of each". Reviewing Happiness in The Guardian, Diana Evans wrote that it "builds in resonance beyond the final page". In The Spectator, Kate Webb wrote of Happiness: "Forna's piercingly intelligent and interrogative novel ... registers tectonic shifts taking place in the world and provokes us to think anew about war, and what we take for peace and happiness."

Happiness was featured on numerous international end-of-2018 round-ups as one of the best books of the year, including Kirkus Reviews, the UK's The Guardian, and South Africa's Sunday Times.

Happiness was longlisted for the European Literature Prize in March 2019, and shortlisted for both the Royal Society of Literature (RSL) Ondaatje Prize, and the Jhalak Prize in April 2019.

=== The Window Seat: Notes from a Life in Motion ===
Forna's essay collection, The Window Seat, was published in May 2021.

Harper's Magazine's reviewer wrote: "With this collection, she proves a compelling essayist too, her voice direct, lucid, and fearless. All the pieces are enjoyable and often surprising, even when rather slight. But the most substantial ones are memorable—even unforgettable. They deftly straddle the personal and the political." The Boston Globe singled out Forna's "fine command over both language and life", also noting "her vivid, keenly observed anecdotes [which] make her tendency toward hope all the more reassuring."

Time magazine selected The Window Seat as one of twelve "must read" books in May 2021. The Washington Independent Review of Books described The Window Seat as "a collection that defies convention. It may just be the perfect post-pandemic read, and Forna the ideal post-pandemic writer." The Los Angeles Times noted Forna's ability to weave in "experiences that are so individual another essayist would make them the centre of a piece, like the time she flew a plane on a loop-de-loop or when she had an audience with the Queen. Here they are part of the texture of her understanding of the world". It described The Window Seat as "intelligent, curious and broad." The New York Times review commented that "Forna's ruminations are deeply felt yet unsentimental ... whose wide-ranging subjects chart a path toward a kind of freedom, to be at home, always elsewhere."

== Awards and honours ==
| Year | Work | Award | Category | Result | Ref |
|---|---|---|---|---|---|
| 2003 | The Devil That Danced on the Water | Samuel Johnson Prize | — | Shortlisted | |
| 2007 | Ancestor Stones | Hurston/Wright Legacy Award | — | Won | |
| 2007 | Ancestor Stones | International Dublin Literary Award | — | Longlisted | |
| 2007 | Ancestor Stones | LiBeraturpreis | | Won | |
| 2010 | Ancestor Stones | Aidoo-Snyder Book Prize | | | |
| 2010 | Ancestor Stones | BBC National Short Story Award | — | Shortlisted | |
| 2011 | The Memory of Love | Commonwealth Writers' Prize | Best Book, Africa | Won | |
| 2011 | The Memory of Love | Orange Prize for Fiction | — | Shortlisted | |
| 2011 | The Memory of Love | Warwick Prize for Writing | — | Shortlisted | |
| 2012 | The Memory of Love | International Dublin Literary Award | — | Shortlisted | |
| 2019 | Happiness | Ondaatje Prize | — | Shortlisted | |
| 2019 | Happiness | Jhalak Prize | — | Shortlisted | |

=== Honours ===
- 2014: Windham–Campbell Literature Prize, Fiction (won), valued at $150,000, one of the largest prizes in the world of its kind.
- 2016: Neustadt International Prize for Literature (finalist)
- 2017: appointed Officer of the Order of the British Empire (OBE) for services to Literature
- 2019: OkayAfrica's "One Hundred Women"

== Bibliography ==
- —— (1998). Mother of All Myths. ISBN 9780006387633.
- —— (2003). The Devil That Danced on the Water: A Daughter's Quest. Grove Press. ISBN 9780802140487.
- —— (2006). Ancestor Stones. Atlantic Monthly Press. ISBN 9780871139443.
- —— (2010). The Memory of Love. Bloomsbury. ISBN 9781408808139.
- —— (2013). The Hired Man. Bloomsbury. ISBN 9781408818770.
- —— (2018). Happiness. Atlantic Monthly Press. ISBN 9780802127556.
- —— (2021). The Window Seat: Notes from a Life in Motion. Grove Press. ISBN 9780802158581.
