= Pilgrims' Way (band) =

English folk band

- Origin: England
- Genres: English folk music, folk rock
- Years active: 2010–present
- Labels: Fellside Records; Talking Cat Recordings
- Members: Jude Rees; Edwin Beasant; Tom Kitching; Jon Loomes; Heather Sirrel
- Past members: Lucy Wright
- Website: www.pilgrims-way.net

Pilgrims’ Way are an English folk band, formed in 2010. In 2011, they were nominated for the New Horizons award at the BBC Radio 2 Folk Awards 2012.

== The band ==
Pilgrims' Way are a five-piece band from North West England.

Formed in 2009 as a three-piece, comprising Lucy Wright, Tom Kitching and Edwin Beasant, they rapidly became known as one of the most prolific folk groups in the United Kingdom. Their second album, Red Diesel was named one of The Telegraph's Top 20 Folk Albums of 2016.

Expanding to five members in 2017 after the departure of Wright to pursue a career in visual art, the band's influences are varied but they share a deep respect for the tradition and take as their inspiration some of the most influential bands from the 1960s/1970s revival.

Named for the Rudyard Kipling poem, set to music by Peter Bellamy, their self-stated aim is to "present gimmick-free English folk of the finest kind".

The five current band members, Edwin Beasant, Jude Rees, Tom Kitching, Jon Loomes and Heather Sirrel play a wide range of instruments, often changing between them many times during sessions, which enables the band to play a diverse repertoire of music.

== Awards ==
- 2011 - FATEA Magazine Tradition award winner
- 2012 - Spiral Earth Debut album award - nominee
- 2012 - BBC Radio 2 Folk Awards New Horizons award - nominee

== Discography ==
- Pilgrims' Way EP (2011)
- Wayside Courtesies (2011)
- Shining Gently All Around EP (2011)
- Red Diesel (2016)
- Stand & Deliver (2017)
