= By the Sea (novel) =

2001 novel by Abdulrazak Gurnah

- First paperback edition (2002)
- Author: Abdulrazak Gurnah
- Language: English
- Publisher: Bloomsbury Publishing (UK); The New Press (US)
- Publication date: 2001
- Pages: 245
- Preceded by: Admiring Silence
- Followed by: Desertion

By the Sea is a novel by Abdulrazak Gurnah. It was first published in the United Kingdom by Bloomsbury Publishing in May 2001, and in the United States by The New Press in June the same year. It is Gurnah's sixth novel. By the Sea was longlisted for the Booker Prize and shortlisted for the Los Angeles Times Book Prize.

== Plot ==
By the Sea is narrated, in part, by a man named Saleh Omar, who is attempting to enter the United Kingdom on a fake passport. Omar also goes by the pseudonym "Rajab Shaaban Mahmud", an identity he stole to use on his fake passport. The novel is also narrated, in part, by Latif Mahmud, the son of the real Rajab Shaaban Mahmud—a man who turns out to be a scoundrel. Latif Mahmud also travels to Europe, but by a more legitimate route—obtaining a student visa to East Germany and travelling by a circuitous route from there to the UK. After the separate narration of their stories, the two characters encounter one another and finally come to a reconciliation. A UK social worker, Rachel, who specializes in difficult immigration cases, plays a crucial role in the novel. It is she who contacts Latif for help on Saleh Omar's case, which makes the two protagonists' reunion possible, and helps to show Saleh Omar's inner feelings.

== Reception ==
Michael Pye, in a review for The New York Times, notes the novel's self-conscious echoes of Herman Melville's short story "Bartleby, the Scrivener". Saleh Omar, the protagonist, quotes Bartleby's mantra "I would prefer not to"; Pye argues that "[b]y invoking Melville, Gurnah opens a little inquest into the nature of pity itself."

Critic Sissy Helff argues that By the Sea "is a fine example of a confrontation of readers with a highly complex picture of the predicament of refugees in the wake of movement and migration".

== Sources ==
- Helff, Sissy (January 2008). "Imagining Flight in Abdulrazak Gurnah's By the Sea". Zeitschrift für Anglistik und Amerikanistik. 56 (4). doi:10.1515/zaa.2008.56.4.391. ISSN 2196-4726. S2CID 55471583.
- Olaussen, Maria (2009). "Refusing to Speak as a Victim: Agency and the Arrivant in Abdulrazak Gurnah's Novel By the Sea". In Angelfors, Christina; Olaussen, Maria (eds.). Africa Writing Europe: Opposition, Juxtaposition, Entanglement. Brill Publishers. pp. 217–244. doi:10.1163/9789042029279_009. ISBN 978-90-420-2927-9.
