= Philip Mitchell =

English author, playwright, poet and translator

Philip Mitchell is an English author, playwright, poet and translator. Born in Manchester, England he is an established author with BBC Radio Drama and was a question-setter on the UK game show Bacha Hi O'Ma! (the Welsh equivalent of Blind Date) but is perhaps best known for his acclaimed translation of Caradog Prichard's Welsh language novel Un Nos Ola Leuad, as One Moonlit Night (ISBN 0-8112-1342-0).

The translation was adapted for broadcast as a radio play (by Mitchell himself) and was transmitted on BBC Radio 4. It was also adapted for the stage and was performed at several theatres including Theatr Clwyd in Mold, Theatr Gwynedd in Bangor, and The Young Vic in London.

Mitchell discovered Prichard's novel when studying Welsh A-level (for which it was a set text) and was surprised to find that it had never been translated fully into English. Indeed, there were those who claimed the novel could not be translated into English as it is written entirely in a dialect common in the Bethesda district of North Wales (where Prichard was born) but little-known outside that area.

Canongate Press in Edinburgh first accepted the translation for publication but the rights to publish Mitchell's translation were later acquired by publishers Penguin Books in London and New Directions in New York City.

Canongate republished the novel in January 2009 with an afterword by Jan Morris and a foreword by Niall Griffiths. (ISBN 1847671071, ISBN 978-1-84767-107-3)

" . . . translated by Philip Mitchell in prose which miraculously conveys the incantatory biblical and Celtic cadences of the original." [The Guardian, 10 January 2009]

"The translation by Philip Mitchell – the first complete one in English – is lovely." [The Observer, 11 January 2009]

"Philip Mitchell succeeds superbly in bringing Prichard’s vibrant prose to life." [The Guardian, 26 November 2014]

"Philip Mitchell's brilliant translation will help ensure that One Moonlit Night becomes a classic in the English-speaking world." [Washington Post]

Foreign language translations of Mitchell's English translation have made the book available to readers in several European countries.
