= Desertion (novel) =

2005 novel by Abdulrazak Gurnah

- First UK edition (Bloomsbury Publishing)
- Author: Abdulrazak Gurnah
- Language: English
- Published: 2005
- Publisher: Bloomsbury Publishing
- Publication place: UK
- Pages: 272
- Preceded by: By the Sea
- Followed by: The Last Gift

Desertion is a 2005 novel by Abdulrazak Gurnah. It was published in the United Kingdom by Bloomsbury Publishing.

== Plot ==
There is, as you can see, an I in this story, but it is not a story about me. It is one about all of us, about Farida and Amin and our parents, and about Jamila. It is about how one story contains many and how they belong not to us but are part of the random currents of our time, and about how stories capture us and entangle us for all time.

The novel initially appears to be a third person omniscient narration, but eventually the reader learns that it being narrated by Rashid, the youngest child of teaching parents in 1950s Zanzibar. Rashid is two years younger than his older brother Amin (whose diary notes are included as one chapter of the novel). The two have a sister, Farida, who is two years older than Amin. The children grow up during a time of heady and frightening transition from colonialism to independence.

Rashid spins two tales: one is in part his own, and largely contingent on the other, set some fifty years thence on the outskirts of a small town in colonial Kenya, along the east African coast north of Mombasa, when early one morning in 1899 an Englishman stumbles out of the desert and collapses before a local shopkeeper outside his mosque. The latter, Hassanali, takes him back home and, amidst the considerable kerfuffle, and with some help from family and local professionals, begins nursing the man back to health.

Hassanali is a nervous, superstitious, cowardly man. On first being approached by the almost lifeless Pearce, he mistakes him for a ghoulish genie come to spirit his soul away.

Before long, an English district officer, one Frederick Turner, arrives on the scene. He accuses Hassanali of having stolen whatever goods the Englishman brought with him, and promptly conveys him back to the residency. The traveller's name, as it turns out, is Martin Pearce, a man of liberal thought and broad linguistic knowledge, and something of an "Orientalist". During his convalescence with Turner, he begins quickly to feel guilty about the harsh treatment and false accusations levelled at his original saviours, for he genuinely arrived with almost nothing but the clothes on his back: the only item he seems to have lost is his notebook. On visiting the shopkeeper to apologise, he sees Rehana, Hassanali's sister, and falls for her immediately.

Rehana's father was an Indian trader who settled in Mombasa and married a local woman, but the family is now part of the "Arabised minority" in a town still fresh with the memory of its years of slavery under the sultan.

The subsequent relationship between Rehana and Pearce is, of course, a scandal. Rashid in his narrative admits that it is difficult to say how it came about, if less so to figure out how it was discovered. The upshot is that Rehana is forced to vacate the town and take up lodgings elsewhere with Pearce.

Half a century later, Amin, Rashid and Farida are growing up and receiving a typical colonial education in pre-independent Zanzibar. Amin, like his parents, is to train to become a schoolteacher; Rashid is studying for Oxbridge; and Farida, an academic failure, becomes the family housekeep and small-business dressmaker to the young women of the town. One of her clients is a beautiful woman named Jamila, granddaughter of Rehana and Pearce. Despite her lowly repute "as a divorced woman whose grandmother slept with mzungus [sic]", Amin falls in love with her, and she with him. His parents are outraged on discovering the secret and refuse to brook it:

Do you know who she is? Do you know what kind of people they are? Her grandmother was a chotara, a child of sin by an Indian man, a bastard. When she grew into a woman, she was the mistress of an Englishman for many years, and before that another mzungu gave her a child of sin too, her own bastard. That was her life, living dirty with European men [.... T]hey are a rich family so they don't care what anybody thinks. They've always done as they wished. This woman that you say you love, she is like her grandmother, living a life of secrets and sin. She has been married and divorced already. No one knows where she comes and where she goes, or who she goes to see. They are not our kind of people.

Amin is made to promise never to see her again, and he never really does. He fears for the rest of his life that she thinks he has deserted her.

In the case of Rashid, meanwhile, it is his passionate book-learning that results in his desertion first of his home and eventually "of the entire culture": "The place was stifling him, he said: the social obsequiousness, the medieval religiosity, the historical mendacities."

After independence and the subsequent revolution, life for all the characters is altered completely. Rashid misses the socio-political turmoil back home in his isolation as a university student in England; in fact, he never sees his ailing, tragic family again. Although he keeps up a steady stream of correspondence, this becomes increasingly strained with the preterition of time and the need for caution engendered of a brutal and dictatorial government. His only knowledge of the situation is gleaned from the letters and a few allusive snippets of news.

Both Ma and Amin lose their sight, and the former's death is celebrated as having put her out of her mounting misery. Years later, Rashid is able to piece the story together using Amin's notebooks, his own memory and a chance encounter with another of Pearce's descendants.

== Critical reception ==
Desertion is one of Gurnah's most acclaimed novels. Mike Phillips, reviewing it for The Guardian, wrote:

Most of Desertion is as beautifully written and pleasurable as anything I've read recently, a sweetly nostalgic recall of a colonial childhood and a vanished Muslim culture, defined by its thoughtful and customary manners, layered by its calendar of festivals and religious observances. At the same time each of its virtues are parallelled [sic] and offset by the petty cruelties of a small, incestuous community. Gurnah's portrait of the society's complexities is the work of a maestro.

Phillips was unhappy only with the novel's account of Rashid's desertion of his roots, describing it as

the least satisfactory, least insightful element of the book [... W]e are told little which illuminates the relationship between the culture of the minority to which he belongs and the chaos which replaces it.

== Themes ==
"Desertion and abandonment," according to Phillips, "are the themes that run through this novel, and which link its stories of tragic love with the history and politics of the east African coast." Where many have seen Desertion as primarily a political, postcolonial commentary on the imperial relationship with Britain, Phillips discarded this as

more or less tangential in the progress of the narrative. Instead, it is the Kiswahili and Muslim culture, along with its Arabic roots, which forms the backdrop of the novel and dominates the lives of the characters.

There is also throughout the novel a faintly Gothic strain, beginning with Hassanali's mistaken early citing of Pearce. On Pearce's apologetic return to the shop, an elderly villager remarks,

[... Y]ou have amazed us, o sheikh mzungu [....] If you had spoken when we found you a few days ago, looking like a corpse, and had spoken to us in Arabic, and had spoken thus in that dangerous hour, I think we would have taken you for a servant of the infernal one.

Doomed love features time and again. All the relationships in the novel (except for the established one of Ma and Ba, and Farida's with her Mombasa lover Abbas, which is nevertheless "long delayed and littered with obstacles") "are doomed, victims of their time and place."

== Readings ==
=== Autobiographical ===
Among the most tempting readings of Desertion is of an echo of the life of Gurnah himself, although no critic appears yet to have noticed this. Rashid, certainly, has a great deal in common with his literary progenitor: both born at about the same time in pre-independent Zanzibar, both uprooted from those roots for their adult lives in England, both passionate scholars of literature, both winning PhDs (Gurnah from the University of Kent, Rashid from the University of London), and both going on to careers as university lecturers (Gurnah remaining at Kent, Rashid repairing to one in country surrounds).

== Narrative style ==
Rashid, according to Phillips, frequently challenges his own reluctance to repeat the "cliché of the miraculous", spinning his yarns in prose intentionally reminiscent of the Arabian Nights, "echoing with djinns, visions, sudden journeys, disappearances, and the domineering rhythms of the surrounding ocean."
