= Peter Brathwaite =

British baritone opera singer

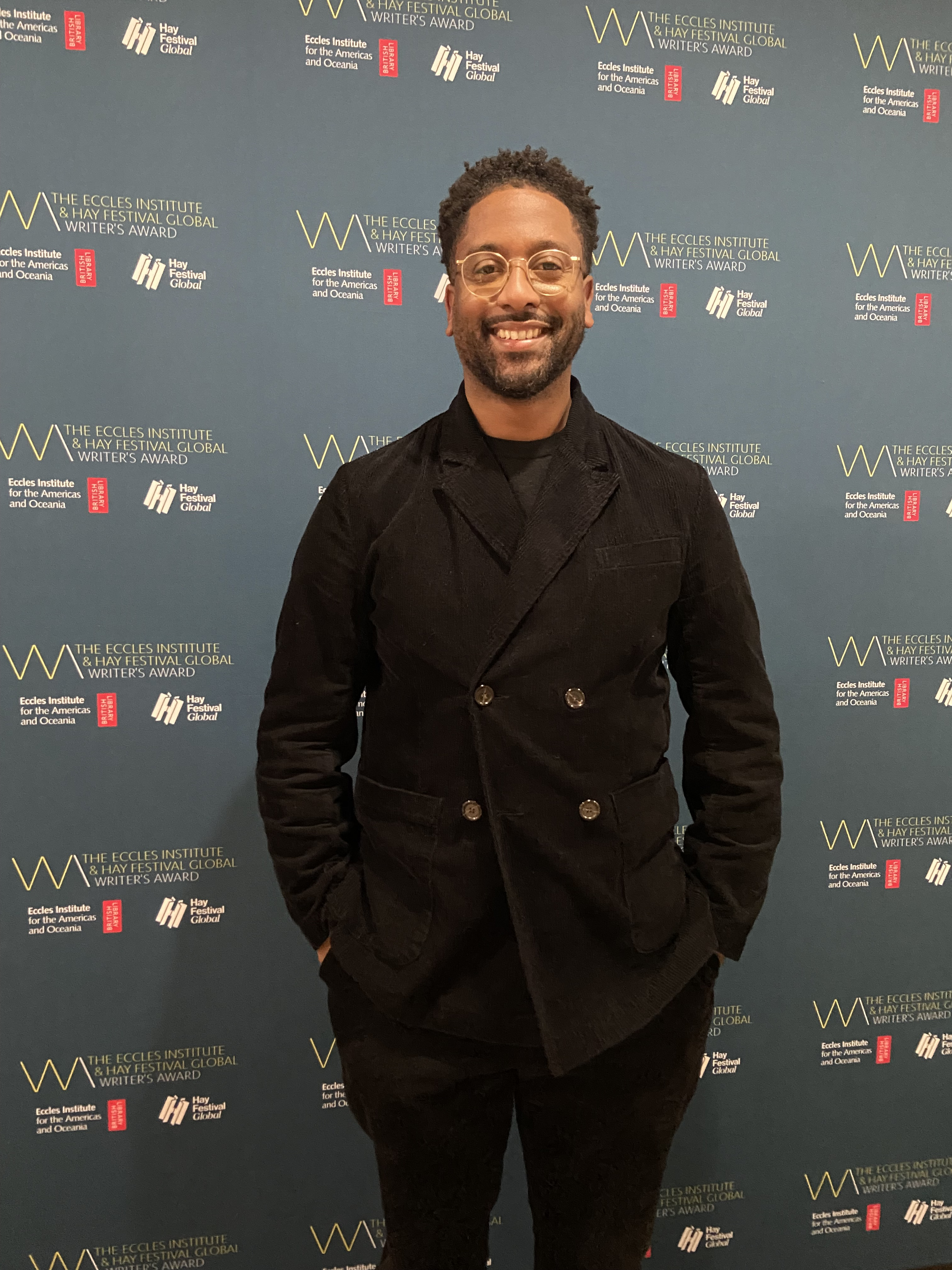
Eccles Hay Writer's Award Peter Brathwaite

Peter Brathwaite FRSA CF Hon DMus is a British baritone opera singer, broadcaster, music columnist for a selection of United Kingdom newspapers, and a developer of music programming. He is also known for his recreations of Black portraits in art as part of the Getty Museum online "challenge" for re-creation of art works, begun in 2020 during the COVID-19 pandemic.

== Education and background ==
Brathwaite's mother, a nurse, emigrated from Barbados to England to work for the National Health Service. Born in Manchester, Brathwaite was educated at Bury Grammar School, a private school for boys in the market town of Bury in Greater Manchester. From the age of eight he sang as a boy treble in the choir of St Ann’s Church, Manchester. In his teens he sang with The National Youth Choirs of Great Britain. He was a gap year choral scholar at Truro Cathedral. Brathwaite earned a first in Fine Art and Philosophy at Newcastle University. He received his master’s from the Royal College of Music postgraduate vocal studies course, before completing the Artist Diploma in Opera at the Royal College of Music International Opera School. After the Royal College, he trained at the Flanders Opera Studio, Ghent.

He is distantly related to the Barbadian poet and academic Edward Kamau Brathwaite. His ancestor Richard Brathwaite coined the term “computer”.

== Performance ==
In the UK, Brathwaite has sung for companies including The Royal Opera, English National Opera, Glyndebourne, Opera North, English Touring Opera, Opera Holland Park and Edinburgh International Festival. Outside the UK he has sung for La Monnaie, Munich Biennale, Opéra national de Lorraine, Théâtre de Caen, Nederlandse Reisopera, Opéra de Lyon, Danish National Opera and at the Hamburg Elbphilharmonie, Philharmonie de Paris and Philharmonie Luxembourg.

In 2018, he developed the show Effigies of Wickedness (Songs banned by the Nazis) in collaboration with English National Opera and the Gate Theatre. The cabaret-style show explored the Weimar era music banned by the Nazi regime. He has also given recitals using the works of the Entartete Musik ("degenerate music") exhibition. Brathwaite made his Royal Opera debut in 2019 singing various roles in the world premiere of Jules Maxwell’s The Lost Thing. The following season, he returned to the Royal Opera House Covent Garden for his main stage debut singing the role of Martin Carter in Hannah Kendall's one man opera The Knife of Dawn. In 2021, he created the role of Joey in the world premiere of Kris Defoort’s opera The Time of Our Singing for La Monnaie, Brussels. Brathwaite created the role of Narrator in Wolf Witch Giant Fairy, a devised collaboration between The Royal Opera and Little Bulb. The show ran in the Royal Opera House's Linbury Theatre from December 2021 to January 2022. Wolf Witch Giant Fairy won the 2022 Laurence Olivier Award for Best Family Show. In May 2022, Brathwaite made his debut at the Munich Biennale singing the role of Paul in the world premiere of Ann Cleare's opera The Little Lives with Ensemble Musikfabrik. In September 2022 he sang the role of Stubb in Netia Jones' realisation of Olga Neuwirth's The Outcast at the Philharmonie de Paris, with Matthias Pintscher conducting Ensemble intercontemporain and the Orchestre du Conservatoire de Paris. In January 2023, the Royal Opera House, Covent Garden announced Insurrection: A Work in Progress, a series of semi-staged sharings co-developed by and featuring Brathwaite. The work in development charts the story of rebellion and resistance in Barbados. From December 2023 to January 2024 he reprised the role of Narrator in Wolf Witch Giant Fairy at the Royal Ballet & Opera. Wolf Witch Giant Fairy was released in cinemas in October 2024. In 2024, he reprised the role of Paul in a new production of Ann Cleare's The Little Lives, directed by Jiří Nekvasil and conducted by Bruno Ferrandis at the Antonín Dvořák Theatre for the New Opera Days Festival in association with the National Moravian-Silesian Theatre. Brathwaite returned to La Monnaie, Brussels in autumn 2024 to reprise the role of Joey in the world premiere of Kris Defoort’s opera The Time of Our Singing. In February 2025 he created the role of Gbatokai in Festen, an opera in one act with music by Mark-Anthony Turnage and libretto by Lee Hall. Festen premiered at the Royal Ballet & Opera in a production directed by Richard Jones and conducted by Edward Gardner. At the 2025 Olivier Awards, Festen was awarded Best New Opera Production.

Concert appearances have included Britten's Canticles at Leeds Lieder Festival with Mark Padmore, Iestyn Davies and Joseph Middleton, and Mozart arias with Tonu Kaljuste and the Estonian National Symphony Orchestra in Tallinn.

Brathwaite has been a guest lecturer at the music department of Goldsmiths, University of London.

== Black portraiture ==
His series of photographs, Rediscovering Black Portraiture, began as part of the online Getty Museum Challenge to recreate works of art. He began the work because he saw few recreations using Black subjects. In a series of self-portraits, Brathwaite reimagined portraits of Black subjects in art history. He produced one recreated artwork each day for 50 days. His recreations use modern objects, and result in a commentary and re-portrayal of the subjects, especially of their presentation as servants or enslaved people.

Eleven of the works were exhibited on King’s College London’s Strand Campus in an exhibition entitled Visible Skin: Rediscovering the Renaissance through Black Portraiture. In a review of this show for The Times, Jade Cuttle noted: "These mirror images with their uncanny resemblances traverse space and time, spotlighting the black lives that have been silenced by the canon of western art, while also inviting us to interrogate the present."

Brathwaite's re-creation of Portrait of an African, attributed to Allan Ramsay, is featured in a film produced for the Royal Albert Memorial Museum exhibition In Plain Sight: Transatlantic Slavery & Devon. In April 2023, Brathwaite opened an exhibition of portrait re-creations, interventions and sound installations at the Bristol Museum & Art Gallery and the Georgian House, Bristol. The solo exhibition transferred to The Higgins Art Gallery & Museum, Bedford in April 2024. A solo exhibition of Brathwaite's works, notably his reimagining of Agostino Brunias' Barbados Mulatto Girl, ran from July 2023 to January 2024 at the Barbados Museum and Historical Society.

In 2024, Historic Royal Palaces commissioned a new Rediscovering Black Portraiture photograph for Untold Lives, an exhibition at Kensington Palace highlighting the overlooked people who ran royal palaces over 300 years ago. Brathwaite's commissioned work focused on expanding Black identities from the walls of the King's Staircase, painted by William Kent.

Brathwaite's 2020 reimagining of a portrait by Alexandre François Girardin, likely depicting Toussaint L'Ouverture (1804), is on digital display in Room 10 on Floor 3 at the National Portrait Gallery as part of an in-gallery film about Toussaint L'Ouverture. In autumn 2024, the National Portrait Gallery released an ‘Artist in Focus’ film featuring a behind-the-scenes look at his artistic process and how he uses everyday objects to connect the past with the present. In November 2024, Strategic Interplay: African Art and Imagery in Black and White opened at the Toledo Museum of Art, featuring Brathwaite’s reimagining of Gustaf Lundberg's portrait of Gustav Badin.

Brathwaite's reimagining of Portrait of an African Man, a painting by the Dutch Renaissance painter Jan Mostaert, was acquired for the renewed permanent collections of the Museum Hof van Busleyden in Mechelen.

== Writing, broadcasting and curation ==
He writes music and art-related columns for The Guardian and The Independent. Brathwaite has authored and narrated the BBC Radio 3 Time Travellers podcast. His BBC Radio 3 series Discovering Black Portraiture focuses on five of his portrait recreations. In October 2021, The Royal Opera House Covent Garden presented Storytelling in opera, a live panel discussion curated by Peter Brathwaite and featuring American tenor Lawrence Brownlee. Peter Brathwaite presented BBC Radio 3's Inside Music in December 2021. His audio essay series for BBC Radio 3, In Their Voices, on five singers from whom he has drawn inspiration, was shortlisted for the Royal Philharmonic Society award for storytelling. Brathwaite's BBC Radio 3 documentary Rebel Sounds sees him travel to the land of his ancestors to discover the music of enslaved people in Barbados, as seen through the lens of his own family's history.

Brathwaite's book Rediscovering Black Portraiture was published in April 2023 by Getty Publications, the publishing arm of the J. Paul Getty Trust. The book collects more than fifty of his portrait recreations and includes contributions by Cheryl Finley, Temi Odumosu, and Mark Sealy. Writing in The Art Newspaper, Gareth Harris stated: "The book arguably reclaims Black history and art." In a New York Times article on artists redefining Black history, Brathwaite was noted for his “scholarly sense of deadpan.” His book Rediscovering Black Portraiture was highlighted for its reimaginings, where he “traverses history by dropping himself into Rococo portraits.”

In 2024, Peter Brathwaite curated the exhibition Mischief in the Archives at the Bodleian Library, focusing on the Codrington Collection’s 18th-century records of slavery and colonialism in Barbados.

In April 2024, The Bookseller announced that Chatto & Windus had won Brathwaite’s family history of Barbados, Not All of Me Will Die, in a four-way auction. Scheduled for publication in 2026/27, the memoir delves into the 1816 rebellion of enslaved people on the island, as experienced by Brathwaite’s ancestors. In connection with the development of this book, Brathwaite was named one of the winners of the Eccles Institute and Hay Festival Writer's Award for 2025 at a reception held at the British Library in December 2024.

== Awards and honours ==
- 2025: Distinguished Visitor, The Queen's College, University of Oxford
- 2025: Winner of the Eccles Institute & Hay Festival Writer's Award, together with Joseph Zárate.
- 2023: Brathwaite was awarded an honorary doctoral degree from his alma mater, Newcastle University. He was made an honorary Doctor of Music (DMus) on Friday 14 July 2023.
- 2022: One of 10 performers and devisers in Wolf Witch Giant Fairy — winner of the 2022 Laurence Olivier Award for Best Family Show
- 2021: Shortlisted for a Royal Philharmonic Society Award
- 2021: Genesis Foundation Kickstart Fund recipient (Music)
- 2016: International Opera Awards bursary recipient
- 2015: Elected a Fellow of the Royal Society of Arts
- 2005: Churchill Fellowship. He was presented with the Winston Churchill Fellowship Medallion by Queen Elizabeth II at an investiture held at Buckingham Palace.
