= Eccles Centre & Hay Festival Writer's Award =

British award for work on future book

The Eccles Centre & Hay Festival Writer's Award is given annually to two writers to support their work on a forthcoming book, either fiction or non-fiction, relating to the Americas. It is supported by the Hay Festival and the British Library's Eccles Centre for American Studies. The winners each receive £20,000, divided into four quarterly grants, and have a research residency at the Eccles Centre, with curatorial support, and opportunities to promote their work at Hay Festival events in the UK and elsewhere. The award was previously known as the Eccles British Library Writer in Residence Award and the Eccles British Library Writers Award.

== Winners ==
Past winners, and the books (now published or as yet unpublished) for which they won their awards, include:

- 2012:
  - Sheila Rowbotham: Rebel Crossings: New Women, Free Lovers, and Radicals in Britain and the United States (Verso, 2016)
  - Naomi Wood: Mrs Hemingway (Picador, 2014)
- 2013:
  - Andrea Wulf: The Invention of Nature: The Adventures of Alexander von Humboldt, the lost Hero of Science (John Murray, 2015)
  - John Burnside: Ashland and Vine (Jonathan Cape, 2017)
- 2014:
  - Olivia Laing: The Lonely City: Adventures in the Art of Being Alone (Picador, 2016)
  - Erica Wagner: Chief Engineer: The Man Who Built the Brooklyn Bridge (Bloomsbury, 2017)
- 2015:
  - Sarah Churchwell: Mastery
  - Benjamin Markovits: A Weekend in New York (Faber, 2018)
- 2016:
  - William Atkins: The Immeasurable World: Journeys in Desert Places (Faber, 2018)
  - Alison MacLeod: Tenderness (Bloomsbury, 2021)
- 2017:
  - Hannah Kohler: Catspaw
  - Bob Stanley: Let's Do It: The Birth of Pop (Faber, 2022)
- 2018:
  - Stuart Evers: The Disappearances
  - Tessa McWatt: Shame on Me: An Anatomy of Race and Belonging (Scribe, 2019)
- 2019:
  - Rachel Hewitt: In Her Nature (Chatto & Windus, 2023)
  - Sara Taylor: Children of Sorrow
- 2020:
  - Chloe Aridjis: Reports from the Land of the Bats
  - Daniel Saldaña París: Principio de mediocridad
- 2021:
  - Pola Oloixarac: Atlas Literario del Amazonas [Literary Atlas of the Amazon]
  - Imaobong Umoren: Empire Without End: A New History of Britain and the Caribbean
- 2022:
  - Philip Clark: Sound and the City
  - Javier Montes for Trópico de Londres [Tropic of London]
- 2023:
  - Ayanna Lloyd Banwo: Dark Eye Place
  - Jarred McGinnis: The Mountain Weight
- 2024
  - Hannah Lowe: Moy: In Search of Nelsa Lowe
  - Alia Trabucco Zerán: Impudence (Descado)
- 2025:
  - Peter Brathwaite: Not All of Me Will Die
  - Joseph Zarate: Todo nace en el agua y muere en ella
