= List of universities in the British Virgin Islands =

This is a list of universities in the British Virgin Islands.

== Universities ==
- H. Lavity Stoutt Community College
- University of the West Indies - BVI Campus
- Commonwealth Open University - BVI (UK)
- Global University for Economics and Business - BVI Campus
- Ballsbridge University Curacao BVI- Global centres in developing countries

== See also ==
- List of universities by country
