= Shame on Me (memoir) =

2020 memoir by Tessa McWatt

Shame On Me
- Author: Tessa McWatt
- Language: English
- Genre: Memoir
- Publisher: Random House of Canada
- Publication date: March 24, 2020
- Publication place: Canada
- Media type: Print

Shame on Me: An Anatomy of Race and Belonging is a collection of autobiographical essays by Guyana-born Canadian writer Tessa McWatt, published on March 24, 2020, by Penguin Random House Canada.

== Reception ==
Shame on Me received a starred review from Quill & Quire, which said: "Tessa McWatt’s original and moving memoir, interrogates ideas of race, belonging, shame, purpose, destiny, desire, and identity. Through an examination of her physical body, she holds up a mirror to the ways culture and society read race and the bodies of others – their skin, hair, bones, and more. She does this with remarkable research and precision – an anatomical and literary close-reading of her own history and heritage." Among other positive reviews were those appearing in Caribbean Collective Magazine ("a vivid picture of how oppressive regimes from colonial times follow us to the modern day"), Medium ("McWatt seamlessly connects the past and present...a beautifully woven account"), CBC Books ("a personal and powerful exploration of history and identity"), and in The Guardian, where Barbara Taylor described Shame on Me as an "eloquent and moving book". CBC named it one of the top nonfiction books of 2020. The book also received the following accolades:

- Governor General's Literary Award for Nonfiction finalist (2020)
- OCM Bocas Prize for Caribbean Literature shortlist (2021)
