= Shara McCallum =

American poet

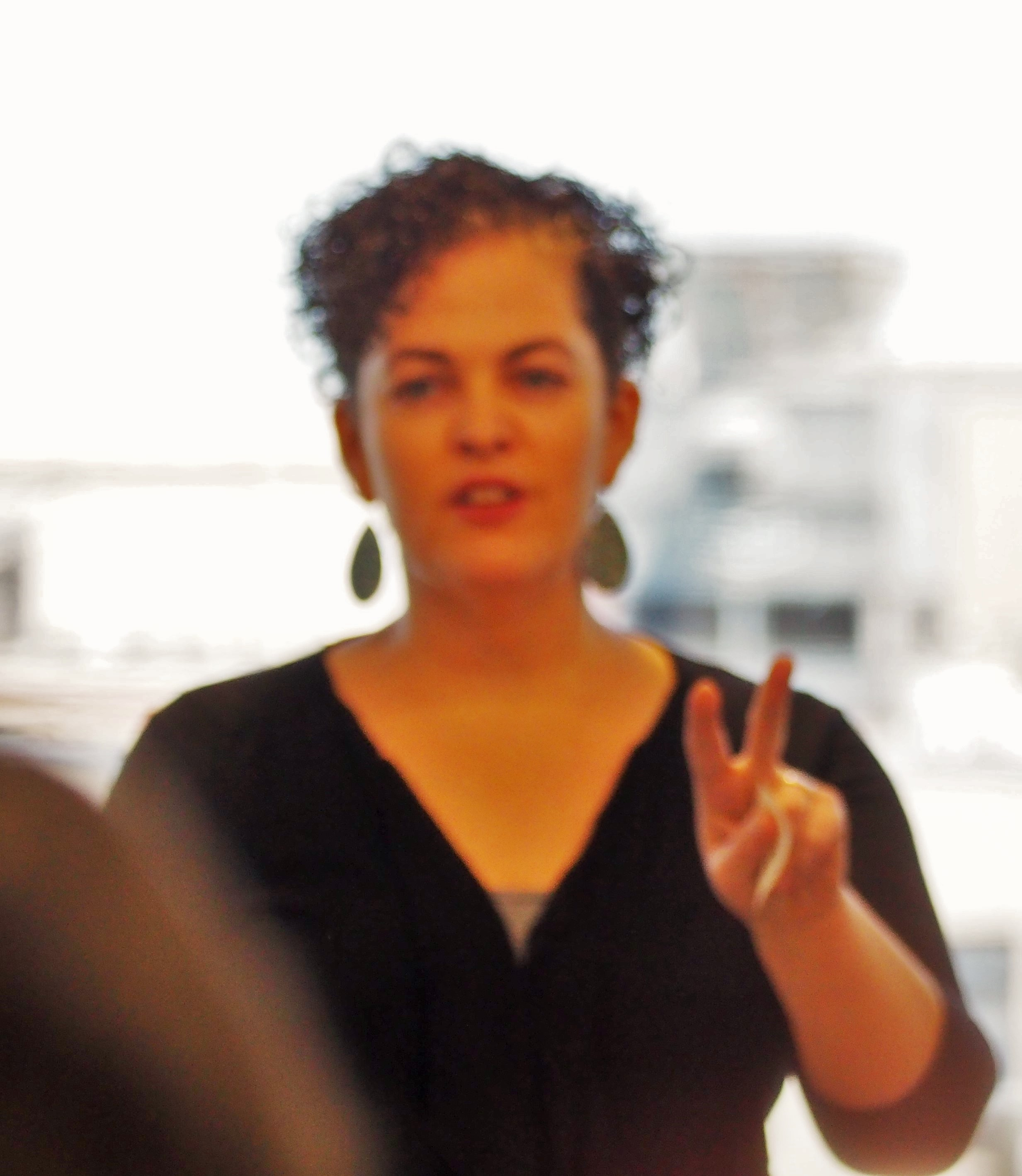
- Shara McCallum reading at Split This Rock 2018, Washington, D.C.
- Born: Kingston, Jamaica
- Education: University of Miami, University of Maryland, College Park; Binghamton University
- Writing career
- Genre: Poetry
- Notable work: Madwoman
- Notable awards: National Endowment for the Arts Fellowship; OCM Bocas Prize for Caribbean Literature for poetry
- Website: www.sharamccallum.com

Shara McCallum is an American poet. She was awarded a 2011 National Endowment for the Arts Fellowship for Poetry. McCallum is the author of four collections of poems, including Madwoman, which won the 2018 OCM Bocas Prize for Caribbean Literature in the poetry category. She currently lives in Pennsylvania.

== Life and work ==
McCallum was born in Kingston, Jamaica, to an African Jamaican father, Alastair McCallum, and a Venezuelan mother, Migdalia Bertorelli McCallum.

McCallum graduated from the University of Miami, from the University of Maryland with an M.F.A., and from Binghamton University in New York with a PhD. She has taught at the Stonecoast MFA program.

McCallum directs the Stadler Center for Poetry and taught creative writing and literature at Bucknell University. McCallum is now a professor of English at Penn State University. She lives in Pennsylvania with her family.

McCallum's work has appeared in The Antioch Review, Callaloo, Chelsea, The Iowa Review, Verse, Creative Nonfiction, Seneca Review, and Witness. Her poems can be found in a number of journals worldwide in places like the United States, the UK, Israel and Latin America.

== Religion ==
When she was a child, McCallum was raised practicing Rastafari; however when she migrated to the United States she stopped considering herself a member of any religion. Later in life, she converted to Judaism. McCallum was particularly fond of the idea that Judaism held about being part of a larger community than yourself alone. She found inspiration for her poems in the songs and practices, such as myths and rituals, of her religion. McCallum believes that her form of prayer and mediation is poetry.

== Honors and awards ==
- 1998 Agnes Lynch Starrett Poetry Prize
- Barbara Deming Memorial Fund grant
- Tennessee Individual Artist Grant in Literature
- 2011 National Endowment for the Arts Fellowship for Poetry
- Poetry fellowship from the National Endowment for the Arts.
- Bynner award from the Library of Congress.
- 2018 OCM Bocas Prize for Caribbean Literature for poetry (for Madwoman).

== Publications ==
Full-length poetry collections

- The Water Between Us. University of Pittsburgh Press. 1999. ISBN 978-0-8229-5710-2.
- Song of Thieves. University of Pittsburgh Press. 2003. ISBN 978-0-8229-5813-0.
- This Strange Land (Alice James Books, forthcoming)
- Madwoman (Alice James Books 2017)

Nonfiction

- Emmanuel Sampath Nelson, ed. (2000). "Mary Church Terrell". African American authors, 1745–1945. Greenwood Publishing Group. ISBN 978-0-313-30910-6.

Anthology publications

- Michael Collier, ed. (2000). The New American Poets: A Bread Loaf Anthology Series. University Press of New England.
- E. Ethelbert Miller, ed. (2002). Beyond the Frontier. Black Classic Press. ISBN 978-1-57478-017-8.
- Billy Collins, ed. (2003). Poetry 180: a turning back to poetry. Random House Trade Paperbacks. ISBN 978-0-8129-6887-3.
- Kei Miller, ed. (2007). New Caribbean Poetry: an anthology. Carcanet. ISBN 978-1-85754-941-6.
