= Augustown =

Novel by Kei Miller

- 2016 UK edition of Augustown
- Author: Kei Miller
- Set in: Jamaica
- Publisher: Weidenfeld & Nicolson
- Publication date: 2016
- Publication place: United Kingdom
- Awards: OCM Bocas Prize for Caribbean Literature

Augustown is a 2016 novel by Jamaican writer Kei Miller. Augustown was published in the UK by Weidenfeld & Nicolson in 2016 and by Pantheon Books in the US. It is Miller's third novel; he is also a poet.

== Plot ==
The book is based on an historical incident from 1921 in which Baptist preacher Alexander Bedward told congregants he would physically fly up to heaven; instead he was committed to an insane asylum. In Miller's reimagining, however, the preacher proves able to fly and people gather in the impoverished neighborhood of Augustown to see the miracle for themselves.

== Reception ==
Reviewing Augustown for The New Yorker, Laura Miller contrasts the book to "the stereotype of a 'poet’s novel'—that is, it isn’t introspective, replete with long passages of description, and scant of plot. Instead, it is stuffed with the characters and stories of hardscrabble Augustown, a former hamlet on the outskirts of St. Andrew founded by slaves freed in 1838."

In 2017, Augustown won the OCM Bocas Prize for Caribbean Literature.
