= Naomi Wood =

British writer (born 1983)

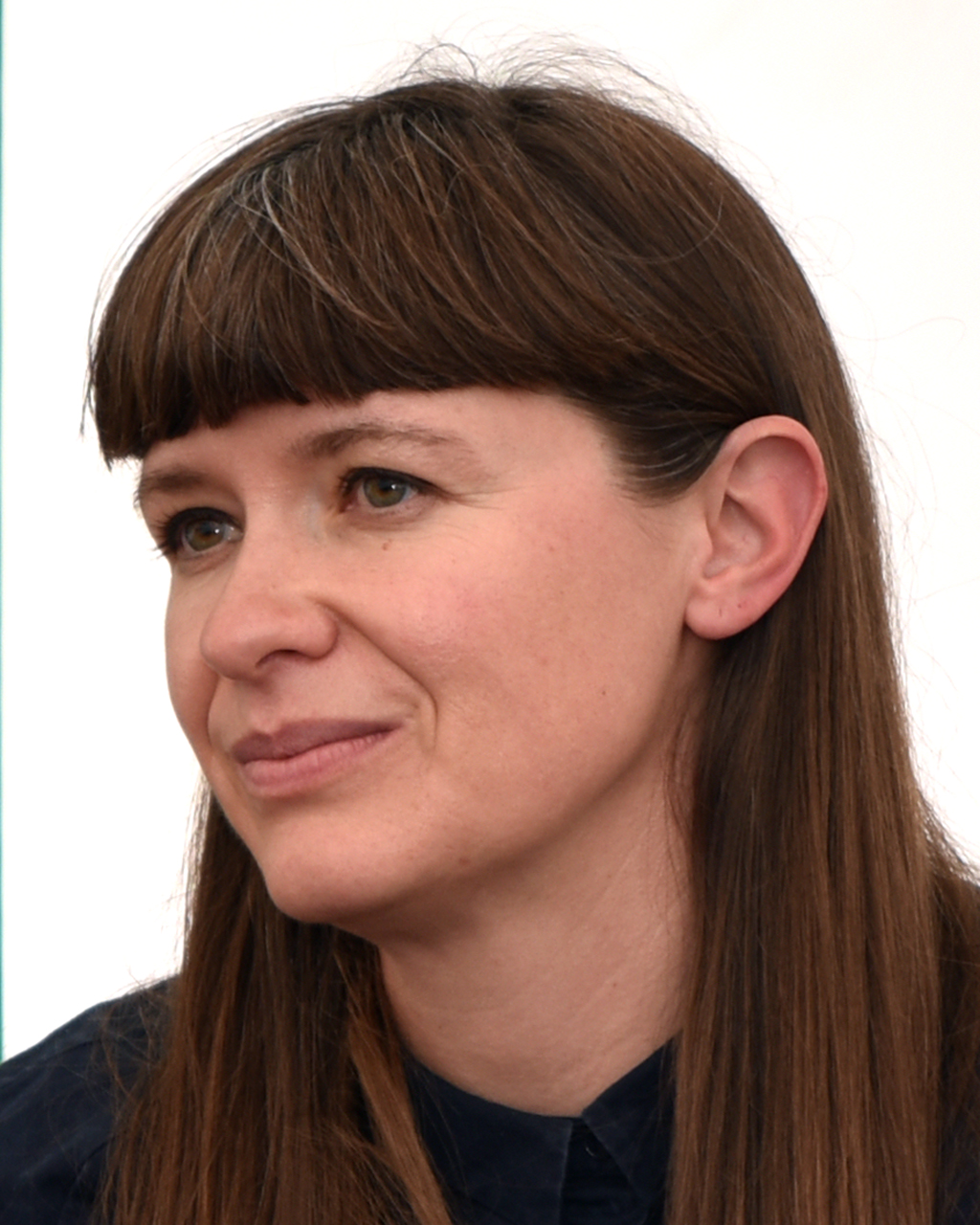
- Wood in 2022
- Born: 1983 (age 42–43)
- Education: University of Cambridge, University of East Anglia
- Writing career
- Notable awards: Eccles Centre & Hay Festival Writer's Award (2012); Jerwood Fiction Uncovered Prize (2014); BBC National Short Story Award (2023)

Naomi Wood (born 1983) is a British novelist and short story writer, and associate professor in creative writing at the University of East Anglia.

== Early life and education ==
Wood was born in 1983 and grew up in Yorkshire and in Hong Kong. She studied English literature at the University of Cambridge and has a master's in creative writing and a PhD from the University of East Anglia. Her novel Mrs Hemingway formed part of her doctoral thesis (2013), which had the title "Mrs Hemingway: A novel; What Was Lost: Manuscripts and the Meaning of Loss in the Work of Ernest Hemingway".

== Writing career ==
Wood's first novel was The Godless Boys (2012), a dystopian story set in an alternative future.

In 2012 she was awarded the Eccles Centre & Hay Festival Writer's Award (then the Eccles British Library Writer in Residence Award) to work on her Mrs Hemingway. The novel was published in 2014 and is about Ernest Hemingway and his four wives. It won a Jerwood Fiction Uncovered Prize and was shortlisted for the Dylan Thomas Prize.

Her third novel The Hiding Game (2019) is set in the Bauhaus art school in the 1920s. It was shortlisted for the HWA Gold Crown.

Her story "Comorbidities" won the 2023 BBC National Short Story Award, and is included in her first short story collection This Is Why We Can't Have Nice Things, to be published in 2024 by Phoenix.

Wood is associate professor in creative writing at the University of East Anglia. She has also taught part-time at Goldsmiths, University of London.

== Selected publications ==
- Wood, Naomi (2011). The Godless Boys. Picador. ISBN 9781447293132.
- Wood, Naomi (2015). Mrs. Hemingway. London: Picador. ISBN 9781447226888.
- Wood, Naomi (2019). The Hiding Game. London: Picador. ISBN 9781509892785.
- Wood, Naomi (2024). This Is Why We Can't Have Nice Things. Phoenix. ISBN 978-1399615891.
