= Jason Allen-Paisant =

Jamaican poet, writer and academic (born 1980)

Jason Allen-Paisant FRSL
- Born: 1980 (age 45–46); Jamaica
- Education: University of the West Indies (Mona); École normale supérieure (Paris); University of Oxford
- Occupations: Poet, writer and academic
- Employer: University of Manchester
- Notable work: Thinking with Trees (2021); Self-Portrait as Othello (2023)
- Awards: OCM Bocas Prize for Caribbean Literature (2022); T. S. Eliot Prize (2023)
- Website: www.jasonallenpaisant.com

Jason Allen-Paisant (born 1980) is a Jamaican poet, writer and academic, based in the UK. His second collection of poems, Self-Portrait as Othello, won the 2023 T. S. Eliot Prize and the 2023 Forward Prize for Best Collection. He was elected a Fellow of the Royal Society of Literature (FRSL) in 2025.

== Biography ==
=== Early years and education ===
Allen-Paisant grew up in a small village in Manchester Parish, central Jamaica. His mother was a primary school teacher. He attended the University of the West Indies (Mona), followed by further study at the École normale supérieure (Paris), and the University of Oxford, where he earned a DPhil (Doctor of Philosophy) in Medieval & Modern Languages.

=== Writing ===
His dissertation was on theatre from the French- and English-speaking Caribbean and a monograph on Derek Walcott, Aimé Césaire and Bertolt Brecht, Théâtre dialectique postcolonial (Classiques Garnier), was published in 2017. A second monograph, Engagements with Aimé Césaire: Thinking with Spirits, will be published in February 2024 with Oxford University Press.

Allen-Paisant's first collection of poems, Thinking with Trees (2021), won the poetry category of the 2022 OCM Bocas Prize for Caribbean Literature. His second collection, Self-Portrait as Othello (2023), uses William Shakespeare's Othello to explore a black male immigrant's search for an identity and masculine role mode. It was a Poetry Book Society Choice in 2023 and went on to win the 2023 Forward Prize for Best Collection and the 2023 T. S. Eliot Prize. According to the Eliot Prize judging panel (which comprised Paul Muldoon, Sasha Dugdale and Denise Saul), Allen-Paisant's collection is "a book with large ambitions that are met with great imaginative capacity, freshness and technical flair."

A work of creative non-fiction by Allen-Paisant, entitled The Possibility of Tenderness: A Jamaican's Search for Freedom in Nature, was published in 2025 by Hutchinson Heinemann/Penguin.

=== Academic career ===
Allen-Paisant is currently Professor of Critical Theory and Creative Writing in the Department of English, American Studies, and Creative Writing at the University of Manchester.

He is an associate editor of the literary magazine Callaloo, A Journal of African Diaspora Arts and Letters.

=== Personal life ===
Allen-Paisant lives in Leeds, west Yorkshire, with his partner and their two children.

== Bibliography ==
- Thinking with Trees, Carcanet Press, 2021, ISBN 9781800171145.
- Self-Portrait as Othello, Carcanet Press, 2023, ISBN 9781800173118.
- The Possibility of Tenderness: A Jamaican's Search for Freedom in Nature, Hutchinson Heinemann/Penguin, 2025, ISBN 9781529153620.
