= Safiya Sinclair =

Jamaican poet and memoirist (born 1984)

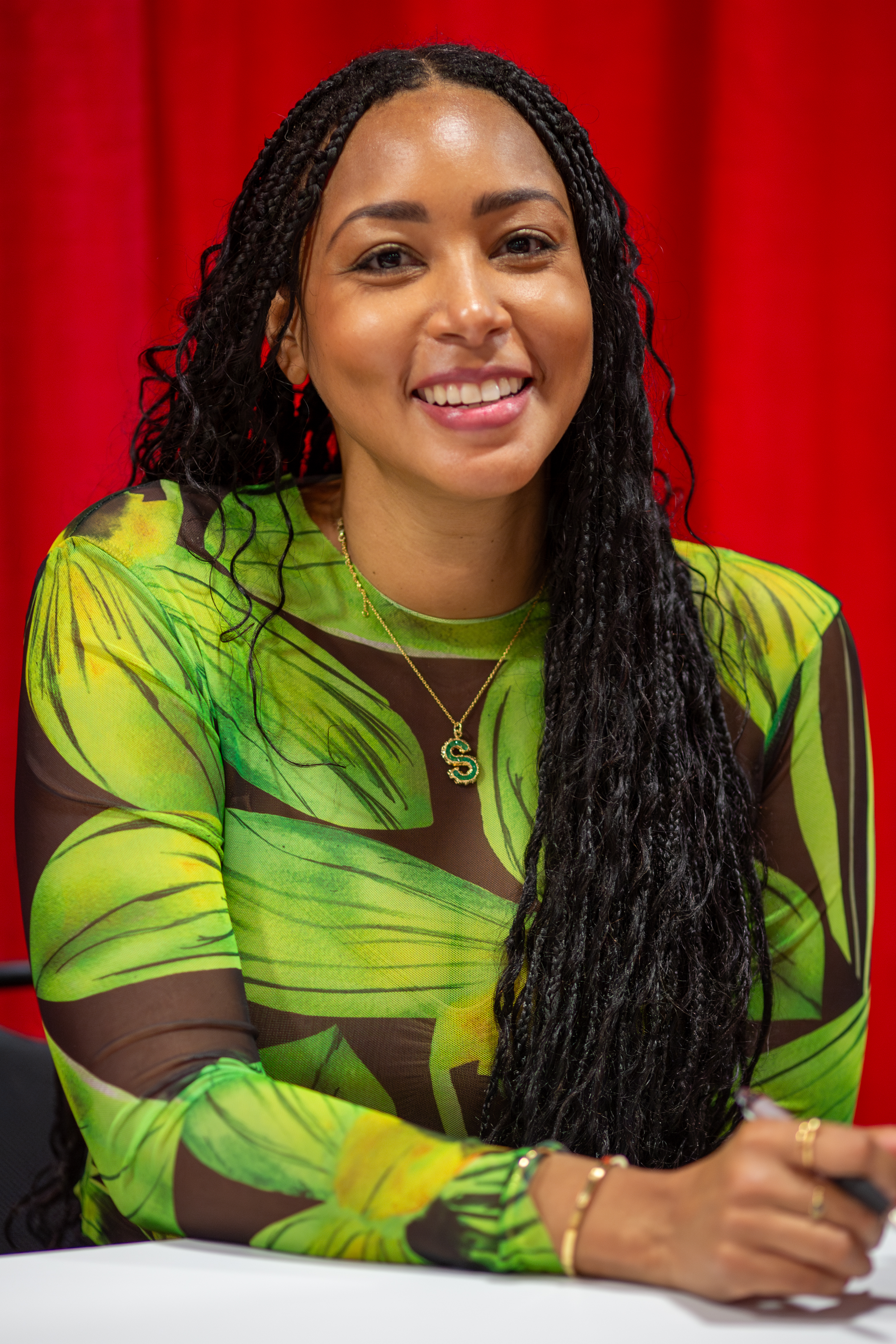
- Sinclair at the 2024 National Book Festival
- Born: 1984 (age 41–42); Montego Bay, Jamaica
- Education: Bennington College; University of Virginia; University of Southern California
- Occupations: Poet and memoirist
- Notable work: Cannibal (2016); How To Say Babylon (2023)
- Awards: Prairie Schooner Book Prize; Whiting Award; OCM Bocas Prize for Caribbean Literature
- Website: www.safiyasinclair.com

Safiya Sinclair (born 1984, Montego Bay, Jamaica) is a Jamaican poet and memoirist. Her debut poetry collection, Cannibal, won several awards, including a Whiting Award for poetry in 2016 and the OCM Bocas Prize for Caribbean Literature for poetry in 2017. She is currently an associate professor of creative writing at Arizona State University.

== Early life and education ==
Sinclair was born and raised in Montego Bay, Jamaica. She is the oldest of four children, with two sisters and one brother. She has described her father, a reggae musician, as a "militant Rasta man". It is because of what Sinclair refers to as the "alienating" experience of Rastafari culture that she turned to poetry. At 16, her first poem was published in the Jamaican Observer.

Sinclair moved to the United States in 2006 to attend college, first earning her BA degree from Bennington College in Vermont. She went on to obtain an MFA in Poetry from the University of Virginia, where she studied with Rita Dove, and a PhD in Literature and Creative Writing from the University of Southern California.

== Career ==
Sinclair's poems have been published in various journals, including Poetry, The Kenyon Review, The New Yorker, and Granta.

She wrote Catacombs, a chapbook of poems and essays, during a one-year return to Jamaica following her graduation from Bennington. It was released by Argos Books in 2011. In September 2016, she released her debut collection of poems, Cannibal, through University of Nebraska Press. In 2019, Picador purchased UK and Commonwealth rights to Cannibal, How to Say Babylon: A Memoir, and a third, to-be-announced book. Cannibal was released in the UK in October 2020.

=== Cannibal ===
Sinclair's Cannibal opens with lines spoken by Caliban, an indigenous man enslaved by Prospero in William Shakespeare's play, The Tempest. In an essay for Poetry, Sinclair explains that she first read The Tempest as a teenager in Jamaica, and at that time identified with Miranda, daughter of the oppressive Prospero. In subsequent readings, after Sinclair moved to the United States, she began to liken her experience of exile to that of Caliban's.

Drawing connections between Caribbean experiences in the present day and that of Caliban's is something postcolonial theorists and poets have done before Sinclair (hence her secondary epigraph from poet Kamau Brathwaite). In Cannibal, Sinclair charts her personal experience of exile from her strict upbringing in Jamaica through her immigration to the United States. Hers is an "exile at home, exile of being in America, exile of the female body, and the exile of the English language." She chose the title Cannibal after recognizing this thread through her poems. As she explains: "The very name Caliban is a Shakespearean anagram of the word cannibal, the English variant of the Spanish word canibal, which originated from caribal, a reference to the native Carib people in the West Indies..."

=== Other work ===
Sinclair's debut memoir, How to Say Babylon, was published by Simon & Schuster in the US in October 2023. Reviewing it in The New York Times, Quiara Alegría Hudes wrote: "For its sheer lusciousness of prose, the book's a banquet." It was selected as a Read With Jenna book club pick.

In addition to writing, Sinclair is also a university-level educator. Prior to joining the English department at Arizona State University, she was a postdoctoral research associate in the Literary Arts Department at Brown University.

== Bibliography ==
- Catacombs, Argos Books (2011), ISBN 978-0981743592
- Cannibal, University of Nebraska Press (2016), ISBN 978-0803290631
- How to Say Babylon: A Memoir, Simon & Schuster (2023), ISBN 978-1982132330

== Awards and nominations ==
- 2015 — Prairie Schooner Book Prize, Poetry
- 2016 — Whiting Award, Poetry
- 2017 — American Academy of Arts and Letters' Metcalf Award, Literature
- 2017 — OCM Bocas Prize for Caribbean Literature, Poetry
- 2017 — Phillis Wheatley Book Award, Poetry
- 2024 — National Book Critics Circle Award for Autobiography

=== Nominations ===
- 2017 — PEN Open Book Award, longlisted
- 2017 — PEN USA Literary Award, finalist
- 2017 — Dylan Thomas Prize, longlisted
- 2024 — Women's Prize for Non-Fiction, longlisted
