= Celeste Mohammed =

Trinidad and Tobago novelist and lawyer

- Born: San Fernando, Trinidad and Tobago
- Education: University of the West Indies; Hugh Wooding Law School; Lesley University
- Occupations: Novelist and lawyer
- Notable work: Pleasantview
- Awards: OCM Bocas Prize for Caribbean Literature (2022)
- Website: celestemohammedwriter.com

Celeste Mohammed is a novelist and former lawyer from Trinidad and Tobago. Her first novel, Pleasantview, won the OCM Bocas Prize for Caribbean Literature in 2022. Mohammed's literature centres the heritage and experiences of contemporary Caribbean people and heritage, often writing in Trinidadian Creole.

== Biography ==
Mohammed was born and raised in San Fernando, Trinidad and Tobago, in an Indo-Trinidadian family. She studied law at the University of the West Indies in Trinidad and Barbados, and at Hugh Wooding Law School, and after being called to the Bar in 2001 she practised law for ten years, in Trinidad, Barbados and Belize. She decided to follow her initial call to be a writer after a year-long sabbatical in 2011, during which she turned to writing as a way to grieve the loss of family and friends.

She joined an MFA in Creative Writing at Lesley University, Cambridge, Massachusetts, in 2014, graduating in 2016. The stories written for her thesis were the foundation for her first published book, Pleasantview. Her external thesis examiner encouraged Mohammed to submit her work to publishers and, in 2017, she received an acceptance from the New England Review. Mohammed stated that she was surprised, "especially as the story is written in (Trinidadian English) Creole, not Standard English". Her stories were also published in other literature magazines, including Kweli Journal and the Beloit Fiction Journal, gaining recognition.

In 2018, Mohammed won the Pen/Robert J Dau Short Story Prize in 2018 for emerging writers. Between 2018 and 2020, she continued submitting her stories to publishers and received several rejections, until Pleasantview was taken on by Jacaranda Books in the UK and was published on May 4, 2021. The book received good reviews and won several awards. This novel-in-stories, set in a fictional town in contemporary Trinidad, explores histories of racism, poverty, violence and migration with a vernacular perspective. "I was writing these stories because the kind of Caribbean books I wanted to read didn't exist," the author has said.

In 2023, Mohammed's book A Different Energy was published, based on a series of interviews with women working in the male-dominated oil industry.

Mohammed second novel-in-stories, Ever Since We Small, was published in October 2025. Inspired by memories from her grandmother and her great-aunt, this book unpacks the female experience across generations in an Indo-Trinidadian family.

== Awards ==
- 2017: John D Gardner Memorial Prize for Fiction.
- 2018: PEN/Robert J Dau Short Story Prize for Emerging Writers.
- 2019: Virginia Woolf Award for Short Fiction.
- 2022: OCM Bocas Prize for Caribbean Literature.

== Books ==
- Pleasantview (2021)
- A Different Energy: Women in Caribbean Oil & Gas (2023)
- Ever Since We Small (2025)
