= Canisia Lubrin =

St. Lucian-Canadian poet, editor, writer and academic (born 1984)

- Born: 1984 (age 41–42); St. Lucia
- Education: York University; University of Guelph
- Occupations: Poet, critic, editor, professor
- Writing career
- Notable works: Voodoo Hypothesis (2017); The Dyzgraphxst (2020); Code Noir (2024); The World After Rain (2025)
- Notable awards: OCM Bocas Prize for Caribbean Literature; Derek Walcott Prize; Griffin Poetry Prize; Carol Shields Prize for Fiction; Danuta Gleed Literary Award; Windham-Campbell Literature Prize

Canisia Lubrin (born 1984) is a writer, critic, professor, poet and editor. Originally from St. Lucia, Lubrin now lives in Canada.

== Life ==
Lubrin was born in St. Lucia and studied in Canada, completing a bachelor's degree at York University and a graduate degree in creative writing at the University of Guelph.

== Career ==
=== Poetry ===
Her first collection of poems, Voodoo Hypothesis, was published in 2017 by Wolsak & Wynn. Voodoo Hypothesis rejects the contemporary and historical systems that paint black people as inferior. The book also addresses the legacy of slavery in Lubrin's native Caribbean. Voodoo Hypothesis was nominated for the Gerald Lampert Award, the Pat Lowther Award and was a finalist for the Raymond Souster Award. In addition, Voodoo Hypothesis was named one of 2017's best books in Canadian poetry by CBC Books and one of the 10 "must-read" books of 2017 by the League of Canadian Poets. CBC Books also named Lubrin a Black Canadian writer to watch in 2018.

Lubrin's second poetry volume, the book-length, genre-bending poem The Dyzgraphxst, was published by McClelland & Stewart in 2020 to international acclaim. The Dyzgraphxst was shortlisted for four book prizes, including the Governor General's Award for English-language poetry at the 2020 Governor General's Awards, and for the 2020 Trillium Book Award for Poetry. The book also won four awards, including the overall OCM Bocas Prize for Caribbean Literature, the Derek Walcott Prize and the 2021 Griffin Poetry Prize.

In 2021, Lubrin was named one of two winners, alongside Natalie Scenters-Zapico, of the Windham–Campbell Literature Prize in poetry. Dionne Brand was also named a winner of the Windham–Campbell Literature Prize in the fiction category, the first time in the history of that award that two Canadians were named as laureates in the same year.

In 2025, Lubrin's third book of poetry, The World After Rain: Anne's Poem, a book-length elegy, was published by McClelland & Stewart. It won the poetry category of the 2026 OCM Bocas Prize for Caribbean Literature. It was shortlisted for the 2026 Trillium Book Award for English Poetry. and the Governor General's Literary Award for Poetry

=== Fiction ===
Lubrin's short story "Into Timmins" is anthologized in The Unpublished City: Vol. I, edited by Dionne Brand, finalist for the 2018 Toronto Book Awards.

In 2024, Lubrin's first book of fiction, Code Noir, was published by Alfred A. Knopf Canada, with a US edition released by Soft Skull Press in 2025. The book was the winner of the 2025 Carol Shields Prize for Fiction and the 2025 Danuta Gleed Literary Award. Code Noir was shortlisted for the Writers' Trust of Canada's Atwood Gibson Writers' Trust Fiction Prize, the Governor General's Award for English-language fiction at the 2024 Governor General's Awards, the Trillium Book Award, the Balcones Prize, the 2025 Sunburst Award for Excellence in Literature of the Fantastic, and longlisted the 2026 Story Prize.

=== Teaching and residencies ===
In addition to her career as a poet, Lubrin is Associate Professor in the School of Theatre, English and Creative Writing at the University of Guelph. For 2017–2018, Lubrin was a Writer-in-Residence with Poetry In Voice. In 2019, Lubrin was a Writer-in-Residence in the Department of English at Queen's University.

=== Editing and literary programming ===
Lubrin was appointed the Inaugural Shaftesbury Writer in Residence of Victoria College at the University of Toronto and worked as an editor with Buckrider Books, an imprint of Canadian independent press Wolsak & Wynn from 2018 to 2021. She was also a director of the Pivot Reading Series, a biweekly poetry reading series in Toronto. In 2021, publisher McClelland & Stewart announced Lubrin as their new poetry editor.

== Works ==
=== Poetry ===
- Augur. Gap Riot Press, 2017. ISBN 9781775056119
- Voodoo Hypothesis. Buckrider Books, 2017. ISBN 9781928088424
- The Dyzgraphxst. McClelland & Stewart, 2020. ISBN 9780771048692
- Qué Nuevo Mapa / What New Map. Ediciones Franz, 2024. Translated by Adalber Salas Hernández ISBN 9788412581577
- The World After Rain: Anne’s Poem. McClelland & Stewart, 2025. ISBN 9780771020063

=== Fiction ===
- Code Noir. Alfred A. Knopf Canada, 2024. ISBN 9780735282216

=== Nonfiction ===
- Sound--at the Interregnum: The Alchemy Lecture 4. Alchemy by Knopf, 2026. ISBN 9781039059610

=== Anthologies ===
- The Journey Prize Stories 33. McClelland & Stewart, 2023. ISBN 9780771047381
- The Unpublished City: Volume 2. Book*hug, 2018. ISBN 9781771664639
- Thinking from Black: A Lexicon. Alchemy by Knopf/FSG, 2026. ISBN 9781039056596
