= Colin A. Palmer =

Jamaican American historian (1944–2019)

- Born: Colin Alphonsous Palmer; March 23, 1944; Lambs River, Westmoreland, Jamaica
- Died: June 20, 2019 (aged 75); Kingston, Jamaica
- Education: University of the West Indies; University of Wisconsin
- Occupations: Historian and author
- Writing career
- Genres: Novels, autobiographies, articles
- Subject: African diaspora
- Notable works: Freedom's Children, Human Cargoes

Colin Alphonsous Palmer (March 23, 1944 − June 20, 2019) was a Jamaican American historian. He was a Dodge Professor of History and African American studies at Princeton University.

Palmer was the author of several monographs pertaining to the history of diasporic Africans. His work mainly focused on the effects of the enslavement and colonization of Africans. The effects that he discusses are known as the African Diaspora.

Palmer attended the University of the West Indies for his bachelor's degree, followed by a master's and Ph.D. from the University of Wisconsin. He went on to teach at several institutions, including Oakland University, the University of North Carolina, and the City University of New York. One of his most notable works, Freedom's Children, contains an in-depth overview of British colonialism in Jamaica one hundred years after the ending of slavery, and is centered upon the impact that the Labour Rebellions of 1938 had on the development of working-class consciousness and the collective disposition to act. It provides insight on Alexander Bustamante's association with the imperial regime, together with demonstrating the roles that Bustamante and, his cousin, Norman Manley, played in the rise of trade unions and the beginning of party politics in Jamaica. These topics are thoroughly detailed in this work, bringing the harshness of the British regime to light.

Palmer's works concerned the history of Blacks from several regions, including Jamaica, Mexico, America, and Africa. His 2016 book Inward Yearnings: Jamaica's Journey to Nationhood was longlisted for the OCM Bocas Prize for Caribbean Literature. In addition to his books, Palmer also published academic articles in journals such as The Black Scholar. He later worked as a managing editor for the Blacks Studies Center and taught at Princeton University.

Palmer died in Kingston, Jamaica, on June 20, 2019, aged 75.

== List of works ==
- Inward Hunger: The Education of Prime Minister by Eric Williams (editor) (1972)
- Slaves of the White God: Blacks in Mexico, 1570–1650 (1976)
- Human Cargoes (1981)
- Modern Caribbean (1989)
- Capitalism and Slavery by Eric Williams (editor, with a new introduction) (1994)
- The First Passage: Blacks in the Americas 1502-1617 (1995)
- The African Diaspora (1996)
- Passageways: An Interpretive History of Black America (1998)
- The Education of Historians for the Twenty-First Century (2003)
- Encyclopedia of African American Culture and History: The Black experience in The Americas (Encyclopedia of African American Culture and History) 6 vol. set (2005)
- Beyond Black and Red: African-Native Relations in Colonial Latin America (2005)
- Eric Williams & The Making Of The Modern Caribbean (2006)
- Ideology, Identity and Assumptions (2007)
- Cultural Life (2007)
- Cheddi Jagan and the Politics of Power: British Guiana's Struggle for Independence (2010)
- Freedom's Children: The 1938 Labor Rebellion and the Birth of Modern Jamaica (2014)
- Inward Yearnings: Jamaica's Journey to Nationhood (2016)
