= Ira Mathur =

Trinidadian and Tobago journalist and novelist

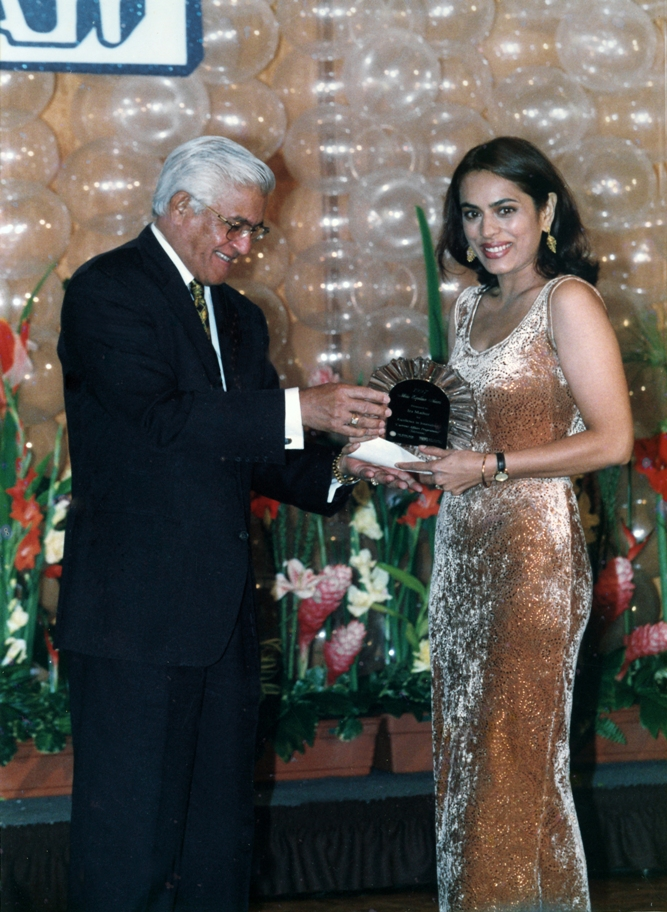
- Mathur receiving award from former prime minister of Trinidad and Tobago, Basdeo Panday
- Born: Guwahati, India
- Citizenship: Indian (former); Trinidad and Tobago
- Education: Trent University; University of London; City University, London
- Occupations: Multimedia freelance journalist and writer
- Known for: Trinidad & Tobago Guardian columnist
- Notable work: Love The Dark Days (2022)
- Awards: 2023 OCM Bocas Prize (non-fiction)
- Website: www.irasroom.org

Ira Mathur is an Indian-born Trinidad and Tobago multimedia freelance journalist who works as a multimedia freelance reporter, Sunday Guardian columnist, and writer. The longest-running columnist for the Sunday Guardian, she has been writing an op-ed for the paper since 1995, except for a hiatus from 2003 to 2004 when she wrote for the Trinidad and Tobago Daily Express. She has written more than eight hundred columns on politics, economics, social, health and developmental issues, locally, regionally and internationally.

== Biography ==
Mathur was born in Guwahati, India, "the offspring of a Muslim mother and a Hindu army officer", was educated in India and the UK, and holds a liberal arts degree in Literature and Philosophy from Trent University in Canada, as well as an LLB from the University of London and a master's degree in International Journalism from City University, London.

Mathur gained diplomas in creative writing at the University of East Anglia/Guardian with Gillian Slovo and James Scudamore and at The Faber Academy with Maggie Gee. Mathur is currently the Trinidad Guardian's longest-running columnist and has freelanced for the UK Guardian and the BBC. In October 2021, she was appointed uncontested president of the Media Association of T&T (MATT) at its Annual General Meeting.

In 2021, Mathur was longlisted for the Bath Novel Award for her unpublished novel Touching Dr Simone. In 2022, Mathur's memoir Love the Dark Days (published in 2022 by Peepal Tree Press) won the 2023 OCM Bocas Prize for Caribbean Literature in the non-fiction category and was shortlisted for the overall prize. Reviewed in The Observer, it was described by Bidisha as "a troubled and troubling book, a heady brew that stays with you", and Monique Roffey called it a "blaze of a book". Love the Dark Days was named as among the best biographies of 2022 by the UK Guardian.

== Awards ==
- 1996: Media Excellence Awards Royal Bank/ Media Association of Trinidad and Tobago - Best Commentary (Print)
- 2018: Second-prize winner of the Caribbean-based Small Axe Literary Competition for short fiction (for her story "Poui").
- 2023: Non-fiction winner of the 2023 OCM Bocas Prize for Caribbean Literature.

== Bibliography ==
- Touching Dr Simone, novel (2021)
- Love The Dark Days, memoir (2022)
