= Jarred McGinnis =

American writer based in the UK

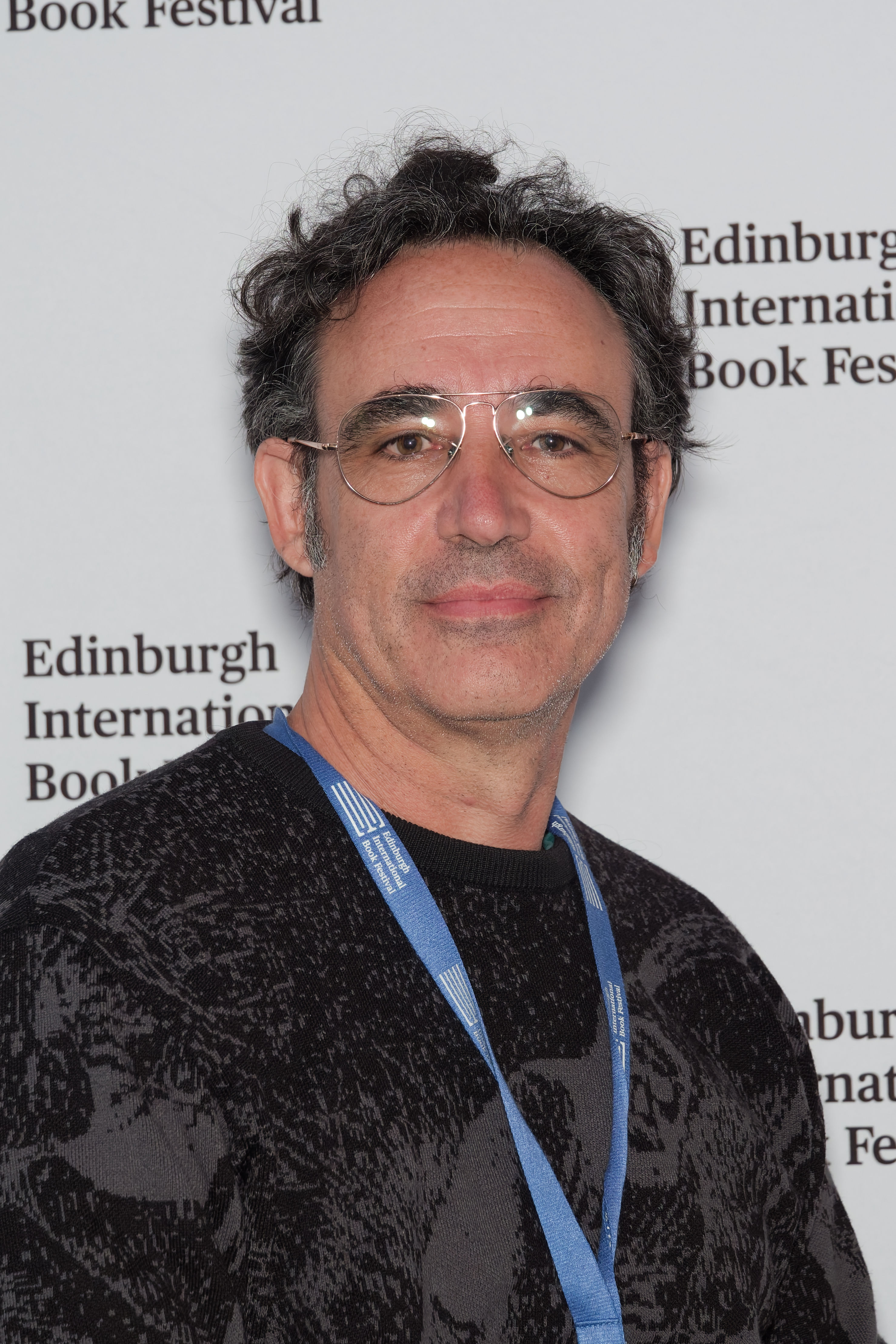
- McGinnis in 2026
- Born: 1976 or 1977 (age 49–50); New Mexico
- Education: University of Texas at Austin; University of Edinburgh (PhD, 2006)
- Spouse: Sarah McGinnis
- Children: 2 daughters
- Writing career
- Notable work: The Coward (2021)
- Notable awards: Prix du Premier Roman Etranger (2022); Eccles Centre & Hay Festival Writer's Award (2023)
- Website: JarredMcGinnis.com

Jarred P. McGinnis (born 1976 or 1977) is an American-born writer based in France and the United Kingdom. In 2021, he was named as one of the best 10 emerging writers from the UK by The Guardian.

== Life and education ==
McGinnis grew up in Siesta Key, Florida, United States. The day before his 21st birthday, while studying at the University of Texas at Austin, he had a car accident that caused a spinal cord injury, resulting in paraplegia and the loss of the use of his legs.

Before the accident McGinnis wanted to study screenwriting, but he turned to computer science when he realized the need for a job and health insurance due to his disability. After graduating from the University of Texas, McGinnis enrolled for the PhD program at the University of Edinburgh, and worked under Professor Dave Robertson and earned his PhD in Computer Science on Artificial Intelligence. His doctoral thesis was titled On the Mutability of Protocols.

McGinnis is married to Sarah, who dropped out of college for a year to care for him after his accident. They both returned to the University of Texas to graduate, and then moved together to Edinburgh, then to London, then to Marseille, France. They have two daughters.

== Writing career ==
McGinnis's debut novel The Coward was published in 2021. Its protagonist, also named Jarred McGinnis, loses the use of his legs in a car accident and is forced to move in with his estranged father. Although The Coward shares details of the author's biography, and draws on his experiences, McGinnis has said that he has "tried not to use the term auto-fiction", preferring the term "livre vecu".

The book was selected for BBC Two's Between The Covers and BBC Radio 2's Book Club programs and was long-listed for the Barbellion Prize. Translated into French by Marc Amfreville as Le Lâche, it won the "foreign books" category of the Prix du Premier Roman (First Novel prize) and was nominated for the prestigious Femina prize.

In 2023, McGinnis was awarded an Eccles Centre & Hay Festival Writer's Award for a forthcoming work for The Mountain Weight, which "mines his family’s history, from the American Civil War to the present day, to examine themes of masculinity, family and migration".

The completed book, now titled There is No Meant to Be, is published by Harvill Secker in March 2026.

== Other activities ==
He is the co-founder of The Special Relationship, described as "the polymath of literary evenings", which was chosen for the British Council's International Literature Showcase. He was the creative director for Moby-Dick Unabridged, a four-day immersive multimedia reading of Herman Melville's Moby-Dick at the Southbank Centre, involving hundreds of participants.

== Awards ==
McGinnis was awarded the 2023 Eccles Centre & Hay Festival Writer's award for a forthcoming work for The Mountain Weight, the other winner being Ayanna Lloyd Banwo.

His first novel's French edition won the foreign books category of the Prix du Premier Roman (First Novel prize).

== Selected publications ==
=== Books ===
- There is No Meant to Be. Harvill. March 2026. ISBN 978-1787303850.
- The Coward. Canongate. July 2021. ISBN 978-1838851545.

=== Short stories ===
- McGinnis, Jarred (2018). "Rough Beasts". In Oldfield, Simon (ed.). A Short Affair. Simon & Schuster. ISBN 978-1471147326.
- Charles III. Galley Beggar Press. 2016. ISBN 978-1-910296-70-7.
- Daughters Of The Revolution. Galley Beggar Press. 2016.

=== Other writings ===
- "The best family hotels in the Maldives". Condé Nast Traveller. 17 January 2021.
- Introduction to: Everett, Percival (16 September 2021). Percival Everett by Virgil Russell. Introduction by Jarred McGinnis. Influx Press. ISBN 9781910312995.
