= Madwoman (book) =

2017 poetry book by Shara McCallum

- First edition
- Author: Shara McCallum
- Language: English and Patwa
- Genre: Poetry
- Publisher: Alice James Books
- Publication date: 2017
- Awards: 2018 OCM Bocas Prize for Caribbean Literature (poetry category)
- ISBN: 978-1-938584-28-2
- Preceded by: This Strange Land

Madwoman is the fourth collection of poetry by Jamaican American poet Shara McCallum. Published in 2017 by Alice James Books, in Madwoman McCallum expands her work to the personal by exploring the difficulties of womanhood, madness, and motherhood. Madwoman's 55 poems use both English and elements of Patwa, the Jamaican creole language she heard people speak (but never saw written) while she was growing up in Jamaica. Madwoman won the poetry category of the 2018 OCM Bocas Prize for Caribbean Literature.

== Overview ==
The poems in Madwoman discuss three different stages: childhood, adulthood, and motherhood, in relation to the study of identity and what it means to be a woman. She speaks about the relations between three different life stages and their intersection. The question of race matters as well in these poems for McCallum, a black woman with a white complexion. The speaker in the poems is the "madwoman", a character McCallum stated is based on a voice that she heard in her head, a voice yelling to be freed. The presence of this voice worried McCallum because of her family's history of mental illness (her father suffered from schizophrenia), but she felt driven to complete her work and free the proverbial madwoman. The madwoman is, in the poem "Madwoman as Rasta Medusa", a merger between a Rasta woman and the Medusa of Greek mythology.

Madwoman was written in two distinct periods: before and after giving birth. Once the manuscript was written, McCallum spread the work on the floor and ordered them anew, reading the poems out loud and deciding by ear which poems belong.

== Themes ==
Mythology, womanhood, Rastafarian life, and memory are significant themes throughout the text. In the poem "Madwoman as Rasta Medusa", McCallum fuses her own struggles with racial identity with mythology, while also commenting on the many histories of female rape victims being vilified. The conceptualization of memory likewise is a common theme used by McCallum throughout her work. She explores memory in various ways: the personal, memories relation with emotions, its relation with identity, and collective memory.

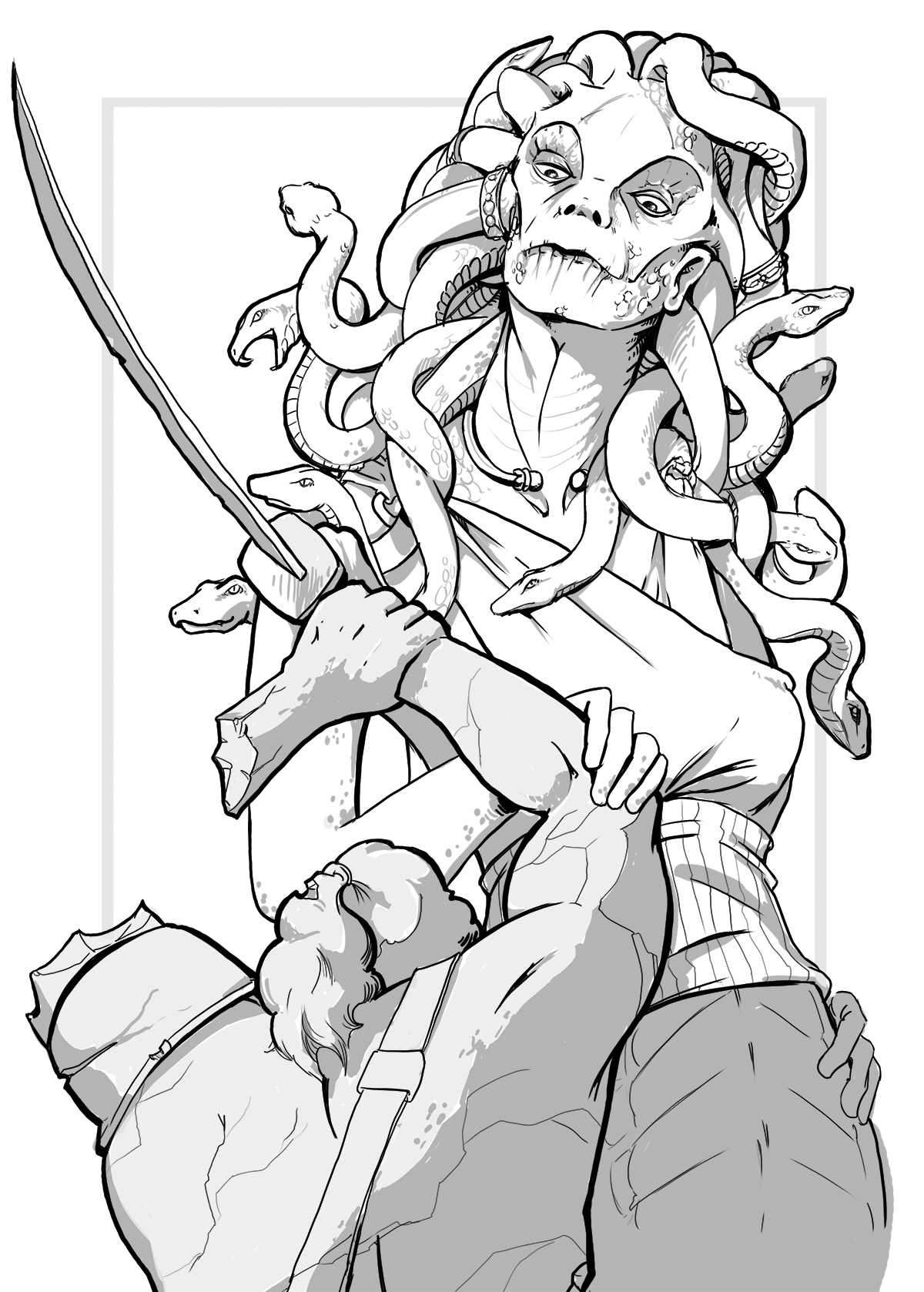
McCallum's poem "Madwoman as Rasta Medusa" was inspired by the mythological story of Medusa being raped by Poseidon in Athena's temple.

=== Use of Patwa ===
McCallum writes in both normalized English and Jamaican Patwa. She has used Patwa in her previous works and often uses the style when writing dramatic monologues. McCallum, who was born in Kingston and grew up in Jamaica (but moved to the US at the age of nine), only heard the language spoken in her youth; she never read it. After being exposed to other Caribbean writers' use of Creole, McCallum decided to incorporate Patwa into her own style.

== Reception ==
Madwoman has been met with high praise and several awards. An individual poem from the collection "Memory" was selected by poet and critic Terrance Hayes for publication in The New York Times Magazine. Hayes wrote that McCallum's work "makes you ponder the relationship between memory and madness" and commented on McCallum's treatment of memory: she "casts memory as both wild and vulnerable, sentient and elusive". A reviewer in Publishers Weekly notes that McCallum's Madwoman is dynamic and unpredictable; the collection investigates identity and the lack of control a woman, especially a biracial woman, has over it. The reviewer cites from the poem "Red" and comments, "identity [is] an heirloom, a force that imprints on a lineage of women". In the poem "Race", the reviewer said that "the constant anxiety of straddling two worlds leaves the subject isolated and dehumanized".

Emily Sterns describes McCallum's use of poetic tools, such as breaks and rhythm, to challenge the reader in the interpretation and understanding of feminism and race. Likewise, McCallum is praised for using her Jamaican traditions to understand her own past and use this form of identity to free the "Madwoman". Her work shows her deep connection towards her Jamaican roots using the style to make sense of the world around her. In a review of Madwoman and interview with McCallum for the Small Axe Project, Opal Palmer Adisa says McCallum has a "familiar and fresh" voice and the poems have "breathy rage and sure-footedness", blending "autobiographical and fictional data".

== Awards ==
- 2018 OCM Bocas Prize for Caribbean Literature Poetry prize winner
- 2018 Sheila Margaret Book Prize
- "Sorrow" selected 2017 best of the net anthology
