= Richard Georges =

British Virgin Islands poet laureate (born 1982)

- Born: 1982 (age 43–44); Port of Spain, Trinidad
- Education: Texas Christian University; Aberystwyth University; University of Sussex
- Employer: H. Lavity Stoutt Community College
- Known for: First poet laureate of the British Virgin Islands
- Awards: OCM Bocas Prize for Caribbean Literature

Richard Georges (born 1982) is the first poet laureate of the British Virgin Islands. He is the current president of the H. Lavity Stoutt Community College and a founding editor of MOKO: Caribbean Arts & Letters. Born in Port of Spain, Trinidad, Georges was raised and currently resides in the British Virgin Islands.

== Education ==
Georges earned a B.A. (English) from the Texas Christian University, an M.A. (Creative Writing) from Aberystwyth University, and a Ph.D. (Creative and Critical Writing) from University of Sussex, where he published his thesis "Charting the sea in Caribbean poetry: Kamau Brathwaite, Derek Walcott, Dionne Brand, Alphaeus Norman, Verna Penn Moll, and Richard Georges".

Georges says that while studying for his B.A. degree, he found himself "falling in love with images and rhyme and would find parallels between writers like Walcott and Eliot with lyrical rappers like Nas and Eminem."

== Writing ==
Georges' poetry is enveloped in the textured sensuality of the sea while also addressing the violent history of the Caribbean and recent events such as Hurricane Irma and the climate crisis.

Make Us All Islands, Georges' first book of poetry (Shearsman Books, 2017) was shortlisted for the Felix Dennis Prize for Best First Collection by the Forward Prizes for Poetry.

In 2018, Georges' second collection, Giant (Platypus Press), was Highly Commended by the Forward Prizes and longlisted for the 2019 OCM Bocas Prize for Caribbean Literature. That same year, Georges presented the talk "The power of poetry" for TEDx Tortola.

In 2020, Georges won the poetry category and the overall OCM Bocas Prize for Caribbean Literature with his third collection, Epiphaneia.

== Selected works ==
- Make Us All Islands, poetry (2017), ISBN 9781848615274
- Giant, poetry (2018), ISBN 9781999773618
- Epiphaneia, poetry (2019), ISBN 9781916046849
