= OCM Bocas Prize for Caribbean Literature =

Annual literary award

- Awarded for: Books by Caribbean writers
- Sponsored by: One Caribbean Media
- Location: Trinidad and Tobago
- Presented by: NGC Bocas Lit Fest
- First award: 2011; 15 years ago
- Website: bocaslitfest.com/awards/ocm

OCM Bocas Prize for Caribbean Literature, inaugurated in 2011 by the NGC Bocas Lit Fest, is an annual literary award for books by Caribbean writers published in the previous year. It is the only prize in the region that is open to works of different literary genres by writers of Caribbean birth or citizenship.

The prize is sponsored by One Caribbean Media Ltd (OCM) and the overall winner is awarded US$10,000. The shortlisted nominees are awarded $3,000 each. Books may be entered in three categories: poetry, fiction, and literary non-fiction.

For each of these categories, there is a panel of three judges to select the best book in that genre. These three books form the shortlist for the prize, from which the overall winner is then chosen by a panel of four consisting of the chairs of the category panels and the prize chief judge.

The overall winner of the prize is announced at the NGC Bocas Lit Fest in Port of Spain, Trinidad and Tobago.

== Winners and longlisted nominees ==
Year	Winner	Work	Longlisted nominees	Ref(s)
2011	Derek Walcott	White Egrets (poetry)	Tiphanie Yanique, How to Escape a Leper Colony (fiction, winner); Myriam J. A. Chancy, The Loneliness of Angels (fiction); Karen Lord, Redemption in Indigo (fiction); Rabindranath Maharaj, The Amazing Absorbing Boy (fiction); Edwidge Danticat, Create Dangerously: The Immigrant Artist at Work (non-fiction, winner); Andre Alexis, Beauty and Sadness (non-fiction); V. S. Naipaul, The Masque of Africa (non-fiction); Derek Walcott, White Egrets (poetry, winner); Kamau Brathwaite, Elegguas (poetry); Kei Miller, A Light Song of Light (poetry)	
2012	Earl Lovelace	Is Just a Movie (fiction)	Earl Lovelace, Is Just a Movie (fiction, winner); Merle Collins, The Ladies are Upstairs (fiction); Keith Jardim, Near Open Water (fiction); Tessa McWatt, Vital Signs (fiction); Loretta Collins Klobah, The Twelve-Foot Neon Woman (poetry, winner); Fawzia Kane, Tantie Diablesse (poetry); Shara McCallum, This Strange Land (poetry); Godfrey Smith, George Price: A Life Revealed (non-fiction, winner); Basil Ince, Olympian (non-fiction); Caryl Phillips, Colour Me English (non-fiction)	
2013	Monique Roffey	Archipelago (fiction)	Kendel Hippolyte, Fault Lines (poetry, winner); Vahni Capildeo, Dark and Unaccustomed Words (poetry); Anthony Kellman, South Eastern Stages (poetry); Monique Roffey, Archipelago (fiction, winner); Junot Díaz, This Is How You Lose Her (fiction); Lawrence Scott, Light Falling on Bamboo (fiction); Anthony C. Winkler, God Carlos (fiction); Rupert Roopnaraine, The Sky's Wild Noise: Selected Essays (non-fiction, winner); Jemima Pierre, The Predicament of Blackness: Postcolonial Ghana and the Politics of Race (non-fiction); Andrea Stuart, Sugar in the Blood: A Family's Story of Slavery and Empire (non-fiction)	
2014	Robert Antoni	As Flies to Whatless Boys (fiction)	Edward Baugh, Black Sand: New and Collected Poems (poetry); Malika Booker, Pepper Seed (poetry); Lorna Goodison, Oracabessa (poetry, winner); Roger Robinson, The Butterfly Hotel (poetry); Edwidge Danticat, Claire of the Sea Light (fiction); Kerry Young, Gloria (fiction); Gaiutra Bahadur, Coolie Woman: The Odyssey of Indenture (non-fiction); Carole Boyce Davies, Caribbean Spaces: Escapes from Twilight Zones (non-fiction); Kei Miller, Writing Down the Vision: Essays and Prophecies (non-fiction, winner)	
2015	Vladimir Lucien	Sounding Ground (poetry)	Marlon James, A Brief History of Seven Killings (fiction, winner); Monique Roffey, House of Ashes (fiction); Tiphanie Yanique, Land of Love and Drowning (fiction); Olive Senior, Dying to Better Themselves: West Indians and the Building of the Panama Canal (non-fiction, winner); Elizabeth Nunez, Not for Everyday Use (non-fiction); Dorbrene E. O'Marde, King Short Shirt: Nobody Go Run Me (non-fiction); Vladimir Lucien, Sounding Ground (poetry, winner); Kei Miller, The Cartographer Tries to Map a Way to Zion (poetry); Tanya Shirley, The Merchant of Feathers (poetry)	
2016	Olive Senior	The Pain Tree (fiction)	Tiphanie Yanique, Wife (poetry, winner); Andre Bagoo, Burn (poetry); Colin Channer, Providential (poetry); Olive Senior, The Pain Tree (fiction, winner); Andre Alexis, Fifteen Dogs (fiction); Sharon Millar, The Whale House and Other Stories (fiction); Jacqueline Bishop, The Gymnast and Other Positions (non-fiction, winner); Austin Clarke, ’Membering (non-fiction); Jenny M. Jemmot, Ties That Bind: The Black Family in Post-Slavery Jamaica, 1834–1882 (non-fiction)	
2017	Kei Miller	Augustown (fiction)	Kei Miller, Augustown (fiction, winner); Marcia Douglas, The Marvelous Equations of the Dread (fiction); Kevin Jared Hosein, The Repenters (fiction); Safiya Sinclair, Cannibal (poetry, winner); Ishion Hutchinson, House of Lord and Commons (poetry); Ann-Margaret Lim, Kingston Buttercup (poetry); Angelo Bissessarsingh, Virtual Glimpses into the Past (non-fiction, winner); Hilary Beckles, The First Black Slave Society (non-fiction); Colin Palmer, Inward Yearnings (non-fiction)	
2018	Jennifer Rahim	Curfew Chronicles (fiction)	Jennifer Rahim, Curfew Chronicles (fiction, winner); Helen Klonaris, If I Had the Wings (fiction); Jacob Ross, Tell No-One About This (fiction); Shara McCallum, Madwoman (poetry, winner); Sonia Farmer, Infidelities (poetry); Kamau Brathwaite, Liviticus (poetry) No non-fiction titles were selected this year.	
2019	Kevin Adonis Browne	High Mas (non-fiction)	Danielle Boodoo-Fortuné, Doe Songs (poetry, winner); Loretta Collins Klobah, Ricantations (poetry); Richard Georges, Giant (poetry); Dionne Brand, Theory (fiction, winner); Robert Antoni, Cut Guavas (fiction); Anthony Joseph, Kitch (fiction); Kevin Adonis Browne, High Mas (non-fiction, winner); Selwyn R. Cudjoe, The Slave Master of Trinidad: William Hardin Burnley and the Nineteenth-Century Atlantic World (non-fiction); Peter A. Roberts, A Response to Enslavement: Playing Their Way to Virtue (non-fiction)	
2020	Richard Georges	Epiphaneia (poetry)	Richard Georges, Epiphaneia (poetry, winner); Lauren K. Alleyne, Honeyfish (poetry); Vahni Capildeo, Skin Can Hold (poetry); Edwidge Danticat, Everything Inside (fiction, winner); Curdella Forbes, A Tall History of Sugar (fiction); Sara Collins, The Confessions of Frannie Langton Tessa McWatt, Shame on Me (non-fiction, winner); Erna Brodber, Moments of Cooperation and Incorporation: African American and African Jamaican Connections, 1782–1996 (non-fiction); Aaron Kamugisha, Beyond Coloniality: Citizenship and Freedom in the Caribbean Intellectual Tradition (non-fiction)	
2021	Canisia Lubrin	The Dyzgraphxst (poetry)	Canisia Lubrin, ''The Dyzgraphxst (poetry, winner); Celia Sorhaindo, Guabancex (poetry); Mervyn Taylor, Country of Warm Snow (poetry); Maisy Card, These Ghosts Are Family (fiction, winner); Ingrid Persaud, Love After Love (fiction); Monique Roffey, The Mermaid of Black Conch (fiction); Andre Bagoo, The Undiscovered Country (non-fiction, winner); Katherine Agyemaa Agard, of colour (non-fiction); Gordon Rohlehr, Musings, Mazes, Muses, Margins (non-fiction)	
2022	Celeste Mohammed	Pleasantview (fiction)	Jason Allen-Paisant, Thinking with Trees (poetry, winner); Desiree C. Bailey, What Noise Against the Cane (poetry); Monica Minott, Zion Roses (poetry); Celeste Mohammed, Pleasantview (fiction, winner); Myriam J. A. Chancy, What Storm, What Thunder (fiction); Cherie Jones, How the One-Armed Sister Sweeps Her House (fiction); Kei Miller, Things I Have Withheld (non-fiction, winner); Ada Ferrer, Cuba: An American History (non-fiction); Chanda Prescod-Weinstein, The Disordered Cosmos: A Journey into Dark Matter, Spacetime and Dreams Deferred (non-fiction)	
2023	Ayanna Lloyd Banwo	When We Were Birds (fiction)	Anthony Joseph, Sonnets for Albert (poetry, winner); Michael Fraser, The Day-Breakers (poetry); Pamela Mordecai, de book of Joseph (poetry); Ayanna Lloyd Banwo, When We Were Birds (fiction, winner); Marlon James, Moon Witch, Spider King (fiction); Jasmine Sealy, The Island of Forgetting (fiction); Ira Mathur, Love the Dark Days (non-fiction, winner); Patricia Joan Saunders, Buyers Beware: Insurgency and Consumption in Caribbean Popular Culture (non-fiction); Godfrey Smith, Diary of a Recovering Politician by Godfrey Smith (non-fiction)	
2024	Safiya Sinclair	How to Say Babylon (non-fiction)	Nicole Sealey, The Fergusion Report: An Erasure (poetry, winner); Jason Allen-Paisant, Self-Portrait as Othello (poetry); Ishion Hutchinson, School of Instructions (poetry); Kevin Jared Hosein, Hungry Ghosts (fiction, winner); Merle Collins, Ocean Stirrings (fiction); Juliana Lamy, You Were Watching from the Sand (fiction); Safiya Sinclair, How to Say Babylon (non-fiction, winner); Myriam J. A. Chancy, Harvesting Haiti: Reflections on Unnatural Disasters (non-fiction); Christopher Laird, Equal to Mystery (non-fiction)	
2025	Myriam J. A. Chancy	Village Weavers (fiction)	Anthony Vahni Capildeo, Polkadot Wounds (poetry, winner); Linzey Corridon, West of West Indian (poetry); Yashika Graham, Some of Us Can Go Back Home (poetry); Mervyn Taylor, Getting Through: New and Selected Poems (poetry); Christine Roseeta Walker, Coco Island (poetry); Myriam J. A. Chancy, Village Weavers (fiction, winner); David Dabydeen, Sweet Li Jie (fiction); Anne Hawk, Pages of the Sea (fiction); A. K. Herman, The Believers: Stories (fiction); Ishi Robinson, Sweetness in the Skin (fiction); Dionne Brand, Salvage: Readings from the Wreck (non-fiction, winner); Erika Morillo, Mother Archive: A Dominican Family Memoir (non-fiction); Edwidge Danticat, We're Alone (non-fiction); Lennox Honychurch, Resistance Refuge Revival: The Indigenous Kalinagos of Dominica (non-fiction); Oneka LaBennett, Global Guyana: Shaping Race, Gender, and Environment in the Caribbean and Beyond (non-fiction)	
2026	Tessa McWatt	The Snag: A Mother, a Forest, and Wild Grief (non-fiction)	Canisia Lubrin, The World After Rain: Anne’s Poem (poetry, winner); Catherine-Esther Cowie , Heirloom (poetry); Lorna Goodison, Dante's Inferno (poetry); Shauna M. Morgan, Ground Provisions (poetry); Achy Obejas, The Boy Kingdom (poetry); Justin Haynes, Ibis (fiction, winner); Robert de la Chevotière, Tall Is Her Body (fiction); Marcia Douglas, The Jamaica Kollection of the Shante Dream Arkive: being dreamity, algoriddims, chants & riffs (fiction); Olive Senior, Paradise Once (fiction); H. Nigel Thomas, A Different Hurricane (fiction); Tessa McWatt, The Snag: A Mother, a Forest, and Wild Grief (non-fiction, winner); Jason Allen-Paisant, The Possibility of Tenderness: A Jamaican Memoir of Plants and Dreams (non-fiction); Kevin Adonis Browne, A Sense of Arrival (non-fiction); Monique Clesca, Silence and Resistance: Memoir of a Girlhood in Haiti (non-fiction); Maria Pinto, Fearless, Sleepless, Deathless: What Fungi Taught Me about Nourishment, Poison, Ecology, Hidden Histories, Zombies, and Black Survival (non-fiction)	
