= Ayanna Lloyd Banwo =

Trinidadian writer

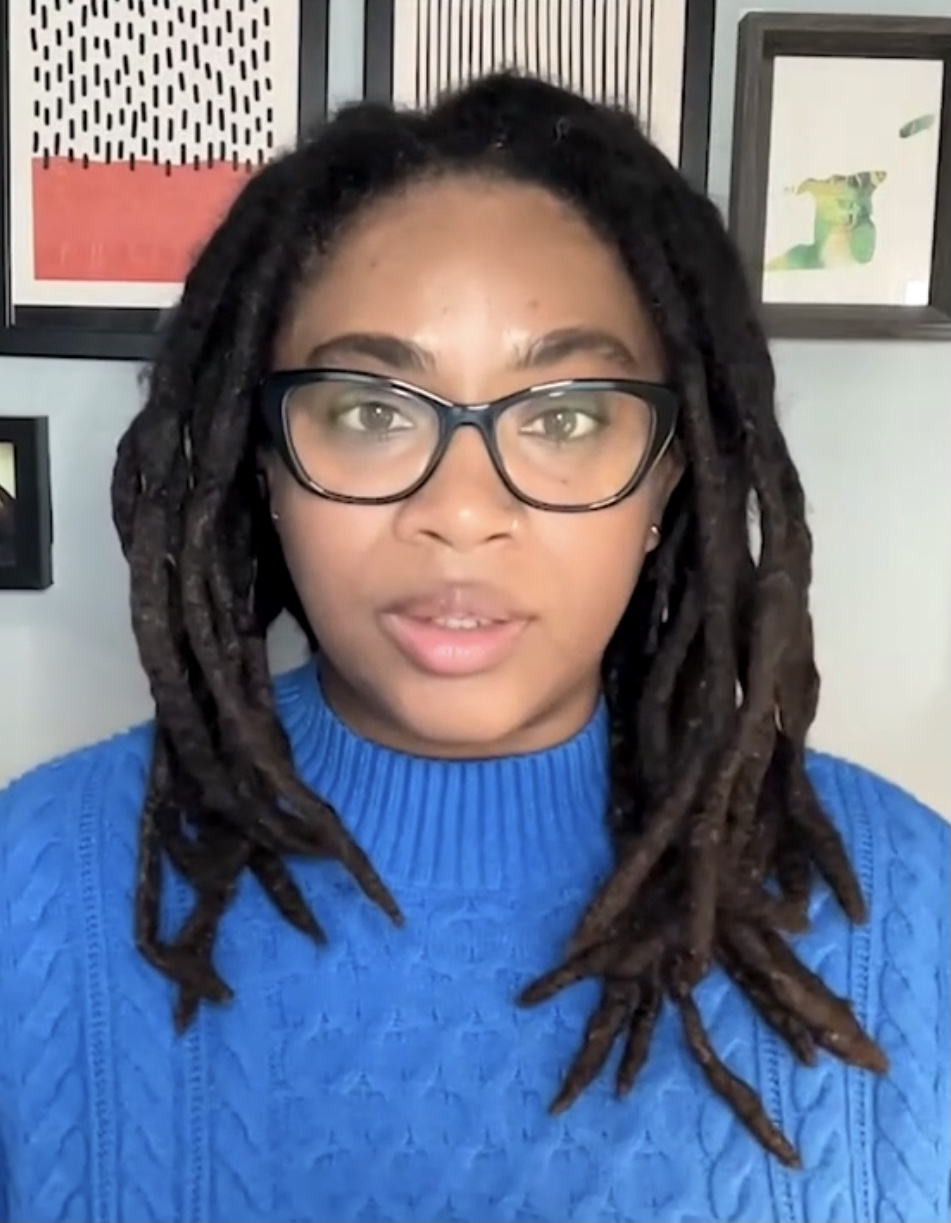
- Lloyd Banwo in 2023
- Born: Trinidad and Tobago
- Education: University of the West Indies, BA; University of East Anglia, MA
- Writing career
- Notable awards: Queen Mary Wasafiri New Writing Prize 2014 shortlist, "Walking in Lapeyrouse"; Small Axe Literary Competition, second place, 2016 "Public Notice"; OCM Bocas Prize for Caribbean Literature 2023 When We Were Birds

Ayanna Lloyd Banwo is a Trinidadian writer. Her debut novel, When We Were Birds (Hamish Hamilton), won the 2023 OCM Bocas Prize for Caribbean Literature, the Authors' Club Best First Novel Award, the Goldsboro Books Glass Bell Award, and an American Book Award, and was shortlisted for the Jhalak Prize.

== Life ==
Ayanna Lloyd Banwo was born in Trinidad and Tobago, where she has said she was "made into a writer", and she currently lives in London, England.

Speaking about her childhood, she has said: "I grew up in a family where we always told stories and we were always readers. My grandfather only gave my cousins and me books for Christmas." Before becoming an author, she worked at several jobs involving writing, including corporate communications, advertising, as an English and literature teacher for 10 years, and also as a freelance writer for newspapers.

In 2005, she graduated from the University of the West Indies (UWI) with a degree in literatures in English, and a minor in history. She has said: "I might not have become a writer if I hadn't gone to UWI."

Following the deaths of her mother, father and grandmother between 2013 and 2015, she decided to take writing seriously as a career. Speaking on the influence of these deaths on her writing, she has said: "I've promised my dead three books. It is a pact that I've made with people who are not here anymore." Her first short story was published in 2014.

She has taken part in the St. James Writer's Workshop with Monique Roffey and the Cropper Foundation Residential Workshop with Funso Aiyejina and Merle Hodge, and Mentoring with the Masters Workshop with Earl Lovelace in 2014, and the Callaloo Creative Writing Workshop in 2016.

She received a full tuition scholarship to the University of East Anglia's creative writing master's programme in 2017, completing her studies with financial aid from GoFundMe donors and a benefactor who took interest in her work. Lloyd Banwo now holds an MA in Creative Writing from the University of East Anglia, where she is currently completing a PhD in Creative and Critical Writing.

She has been featured in the "Who's Next?" segment for emerging writers at the Bocas Lit Fest and Bocas South. Since 2016, she has served as consulting fiction editor for Moko magazine.

== Works ==
She had her first publication in The Caribbean Writer with "Nightwalking" and her work has appeared in other publications, including Moko Magazine, Small Axe, POUi, PREE, Callaloo and Anomaly.

She is one of 10 commissioned writers for the forthcoming Colonial Countryside: National Trust Houses Reimagined, a child-led project exploring the colonial history of 11 National Trust properties. She has recorded a reading of her work "The Shadow Man" and answered questions on her contribution to the project for The Commissioned Writer's Podcast.

Her first novel, When We Were Birds, was published in February 2022 by Hamish Hamilton. Author Marlon James described the book as "A searing symphony of magic and loss, love and hope", while Kirkus Reviews praised the novel's "unique world expansive enough to contain a ghost story, a love story, a mysterious mythology, and a thoughtful examination of how family bonds keep us firmly rooted to our pasts."

She is currently working on her second novel. Speaking to The Observer, she has said: "The novel looks at a house that has been passed down through five generations of women, and the protagonist has returned home to inherit this house. She’s going to sell it off because her life is not in Trinidad anymore and then finds that she can’t for various mysterious, supernatural reasons. It tracks a relationship with a house that doesn’t want to be parted from her." Addressing her work's connection to Trinidad, she has said: “I think that my sensibility for story has always been indigenous Caribbean cadence, whether how a character speaks, how a story might unfold, or the kinds of things you might find [in the plot]."

== Awards and recognition ==
In 2014, she was shortlisted for the Wasafari New Writing Prize for "Walking in Lapeyrouse". In the same year, she was shortlisted for the Small Axe Literary Competition, where she received second prize for her short story "Public Notice" in 2016.

When We Were Birds featured in several lists of the most-anticipated novels of 2022, including The Irish Times and The New Statesman. She featured in The Observer's list of the 10 best debut novelists of 2022. The novel was the overall winner of the 2023 OCM Bocas Prize for Caribbean Literature. It was shortlisted for the 2023 Jhalak Prize. It won the Authors' Club Best First Novel Award. It also won the Goldsboro Books Glass Bell Award and an American Book Award.

She won the 2023 Eccles Centre & Hay Festival Writer's award, together with Jarred McGinnis.

== Bibliography ==
=== Short stories ===
- "Nightwalking" (The Caribbean Writer, Volume 28, 2014)
- "Dark Eye Place" (Callaloo, Volume 40, Number 2, Spring 2017)
- "Public Notice" (Small Axe, Issue 53, July 2017)
- "Homegoing" (POUi: Cave Hill Journal for Creative Writing, Volume XVIII, March 2018)
- "Nothing the Forest Raises is a Monster" (Pree, April 2018)
- "Sea Change" (Anomaly, Issue 28, April 2019)

=== Novels ===
- When We Were Birds (Hamish Hamilton, 2022), ISBN 9780241502792.
