= Kei Miller =

Jamaican poet and fiction writer

Kei Miller FRSL
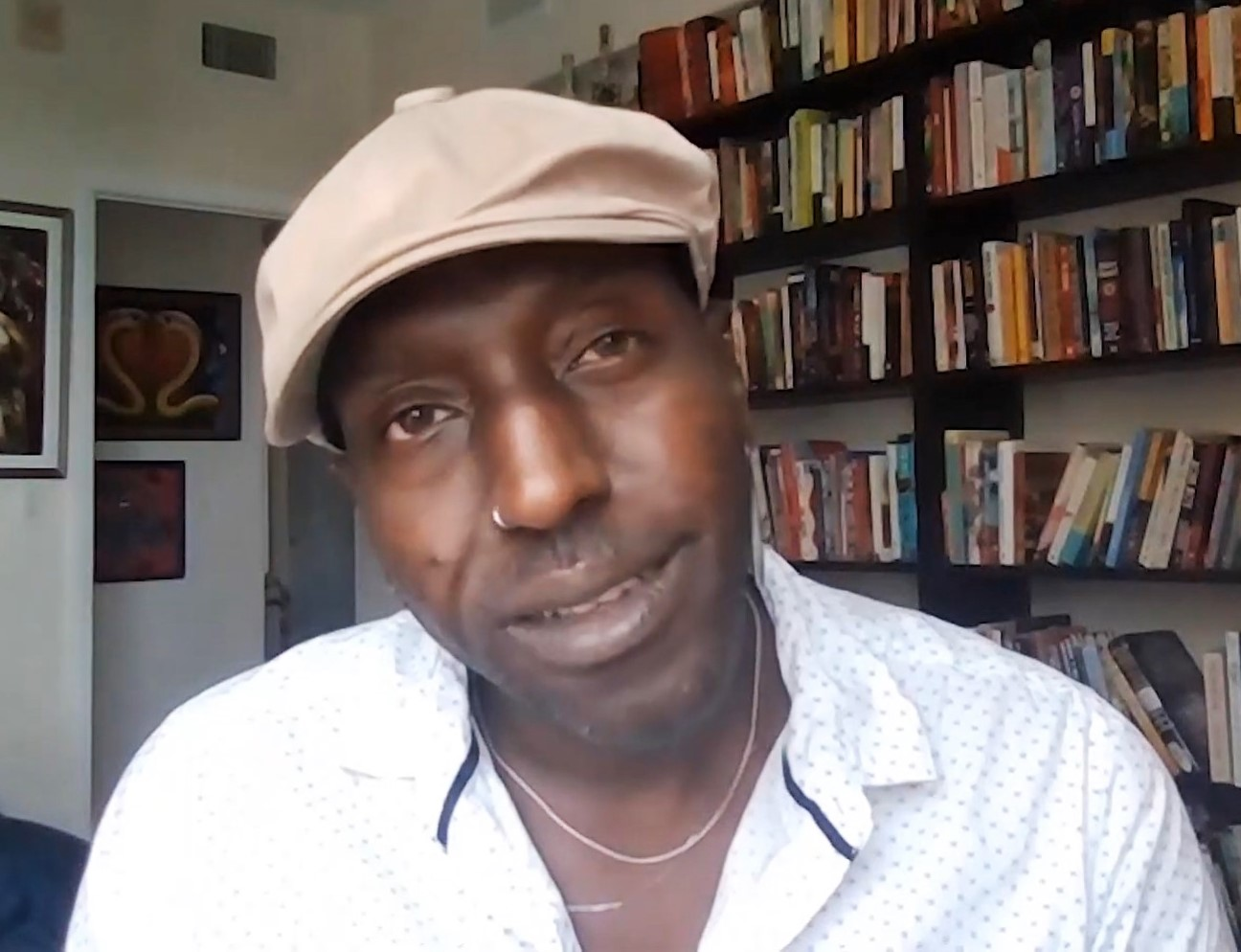
- Miller reads from his work nominated for the Jhalak Prize 2022
- Born: 24 October 1978 (age 47); Kingston, Surrey County, Jamaica
- Education: University of the West Indies; Manchester Metropolitan University; University of Glasgow
- Writing career
- Notable works: The Cartographer Tries to Map a Way to Zion (2014); Augustown (2016)
- Notable awards: OCM Bocas Prize for Caribbean Literature

Kei Miller FRSL (born 24 October 1978) is a Jamaican poet, fiction writer, essayist and blogger. He is also a professor of creative writing.

== Early life and education ==
Kei Miller was born and raised in Kingston, Jamaica. He studied English at the University of the West Indies, but dropped out short of graduation. While there, he befriended Mervyn Morris, who encouraged his writing. Afterwards, Miller began publishing widely throughout the Caribbean.

In 2004, he migrated to England, pursuing an MA in Creative Writing (The Novel) at Manchester Metropolitan University under the tutelage of poet and scholar Michael Schmidt. Miller later completed a PhD in English Literature at the University of Glasgow.

== Career ==
In 2006, Miller's first book of poetry was released, Kingdom of Empty Bellies (Heaventree Press). It was shortly followed by a collection of short stories, The Fear of Stones, which partly explores issues of Jamaican homophobia. The collection was shortlisted in 2007 for a Commonwealth Writers' Prize in the category of Best First Book (Canada or Caribbean). His second collection of poetry, There Is an Anger That Moves, was published in 2007 by Carcanet Press. He is also the editor of Carcanet's 2007 New Caribbean Poetry: An Anthology. His first novel, The Same Earth, was published in 2008, followed in 2010 by The Last Warner Woman. That same year saw the publication of his poetry collection A Light Song of Light. In 2013 his Writing Down the Vision: Essays & Prophecies was published, and in 2014 a collection of poems for which he was awarded the Forward Prize, The Cartographer Tries to Map a Way to Zion. Hilary Mantel chose The Cartographer Tries to Map a Way to Zion as one of her favourite books of 2014. This compilation includes a poem on unusual Jamaican place-names, such as Me-no-Sen-You-no-Come. He published a collection of essays titled Things I Have Withheld in 2021, which was shortlisted for the Baillie Gifford Prize for Nonfiction.

In 2014, Miller was named as one of the 20 "Next Generation Poets", a list compiled every ten years by the Poetry Book Society.

He was an International Writing Fellow at the University of Iowa, and has also been a visiting writer at York University in Canada, at the Department of Library Services in the British Virgin Islands and a Vera Rubin Fellow at Yaddo. He currently divides his time between Jamaica and the United Kingdom. Until 2014, he was Reader at the University of Glasgow. He is currently Professor of Creative Writing at the University of Exeter.

Miller's third novel, Augustown, won the 2017 OCM Bocas Prize for Caribbean Literature.

Miller was awarded the 2018 Anthony N Sabga Caribbean Award for Excellence in Arts & Letters.

In June 2018, Miller was elected Fellow of the Royal Society of Literature in its "40 Under 40" initiative.

Miller was a judge for the 2020 Griffin Poetry Prize.

In 2026, Miller received a Windham–Campbell Literature Prize in the poetry.

== Awards and honours ==
- 2007: International Writer's Fellowship at the University of Iowa
- 2009: Silver Musgrave Medal from the Institute of Jamaica
- 2010: Shortlisted for the John Llewellyn Rhys Prize, A Light Song of Light
- 2013: Rex Nettleford Fellow in Cultural Studies
- 2013: Shortlisted for the Phillis Wheatley Book Award in Fiction, The Last Warner Woman
- 2014: Named as one of the Next Generation Poets
- 2014: OCM Bocas Prize for Caribbean Literature (Non-fiction), Writing Down the Vision
- 2014: Shortlisted for the international Dylan Thomas Prize, The Cartographer Tries to Map A Way to Zion
- 2014: Winner of the Forward Prize for Poetry, The Cartographer Tries to Map A Way to Zion
- 2017: Winner of the OCM Bocas Prize for Caribbean Literature for Augustown
- 2017: Winner of the Prix Carbet de la Caraïbe et du Tout-Monde for By The Rivers of Babylon (French Translation of Augustown)
- 2018: Winner of an Anthony N Sabga Caribbean Award for Excellence (Arts & Letters)
- 2018: Elected a Fellow of the Royal Society of Literature
- 2018: Winner of the Prix Les Afriques for By The Rivers of Babylon (French Translation of Augustown)
- 2021: Shortlisted for the Baillie Gifford Prize for Nonfiction for Things I Have Withheld
- 2022: Shortlisted for the Jhalak Prize for Things I Have Withheld

== Selected works ==
- Fear of Stones and Other Stories (short stories), Macmillan Caribbean, 2006, ISBN 978-1-4050-6637-2.
- Kingdom of Empty Bellies (poems), Heaventree Press, 2006, ISBN 978-0-9548811-2-2.
- There Is an Anger That Moves, Carcanet Press, 2007, ISBN 978-1-85754-945-4.
- The Same Earth (novel), Weidenfeld & Nicolson, 2008, ISBN 978-0-297-84480-8; Phoenix, 2009, ISBN 978-0-7538-2311-8.
- The Last Warner Woman (novel), Weidenfeld & Nicolson, 2010, ISBN 978-0-297-86077-8; Phoenix, 2011, ISBN 978-0-7538-2808-3.
- A Light Song of Light (poems), Carcanet Press, 2010, ISBN 978-1-84777-103-2.
- Writing Down the Vision: Essays & Prophecies, Peepal Tree Press, 2013, ISBN 978-1-84523-228-3.
- The Cartographer Tries to Map a Way to Zion (poems), Carcanet, 2014, ISBN 978-1-84777-267-1.
- Augustown (novel), Weidenfeld & Nicolson, 2016, ISBN 978-1-4746-0359-1
- Things I Have Withheld (essays), Canongate Books Ltd, 2021, ISBN 978-1-83885-279-5

As editor

- New Caribbean Poetry: An Anthology, Carcanet Press, 2007, ISBN 978-1-85754-941-6.

== See also ==
- Danielle Boodoo-Fortuné
- Claudia Rankine
