= H. Lavity Stoutt Community College =

Educational institution in the British Virgin Islands

H. Lavity Stoutt Community College (HLSCC)
- Motto: Our Tomorrow Begins Today
- Type: Community College
- Established: 1990
- Affiliations: Association of Caribbean Tertiary Institutions; American Association of Community Colleges; Middle States Commission on Higher Education; Association of Governing Boards of Universities and Colleges
- President: Dr. Richard Georges
- Academic staff: 35 Full Time
- Administrative staff: 110
- Students: 600+
- Location: Paraquita Bay Campus, P.O Box 3097, Road Town, Tortola, British Virgin Islands, Paraquita Bay, Tortola, British Virgin Islands; 18.4240°N 64.5785°W
- Campus: Paraquita Bay
- Colors: Green & Gold
- Nickname: HLSCC
- Mascot: Stingray
- Website: www.hlscc.edu.vg

The H. Lavity Stoutt Community College (often referred to locally as HLSCC) is a community college in the British Virgin Islands. At present there are only two tertiary institutions in the territory: The University of the West Indies, and H. Lavity Stoutt Community College which has a higher enrollment.

== History ==
The college was originally established in 1990 as the British Virgin Islands Community College under the College Act, 1990. The institution was subsequently renamed in favour of Hamilton Lavity Stoutt, first Chief Minister of the British Virgin Islands and founding chairman of the college's Board of Governors. In 1993 the College moved into a new three-storey facility at its Paraquita Bay Campus, where it still principally resides. The first campus building encompassed some 10,000 square feet and had 15 classrooms and laboratories on the upper floors, and 4,700 square feet for administrative offices on the ground floor.

Eileene L. Parsons was a bursar at the school before she became a politician and minister. There is an auditorium at the college which is named in her honour.

== Academics ==
The current study body is over 600 students. The college is currently led by President Dr. Richard Georges, an alumnus of the school. Many students attend the college for a period of one or two years to either complete an associate degree or obtain a certain amount of course credit before transferring to a college in the United States. HLSCC was accredited by the Middle States Commission on Higher Education in 2015.

== Funding ==
As part of Government education policy HLSCC is free to attend for native BVIslanders. This in turn has led to significant funding pressures.
