= Portrait of an African Man =

Painting by Jan Mostaert

Portrait of an African Man (Christophle le More?)
- Portret van een Afrikaanse man (Dutch)
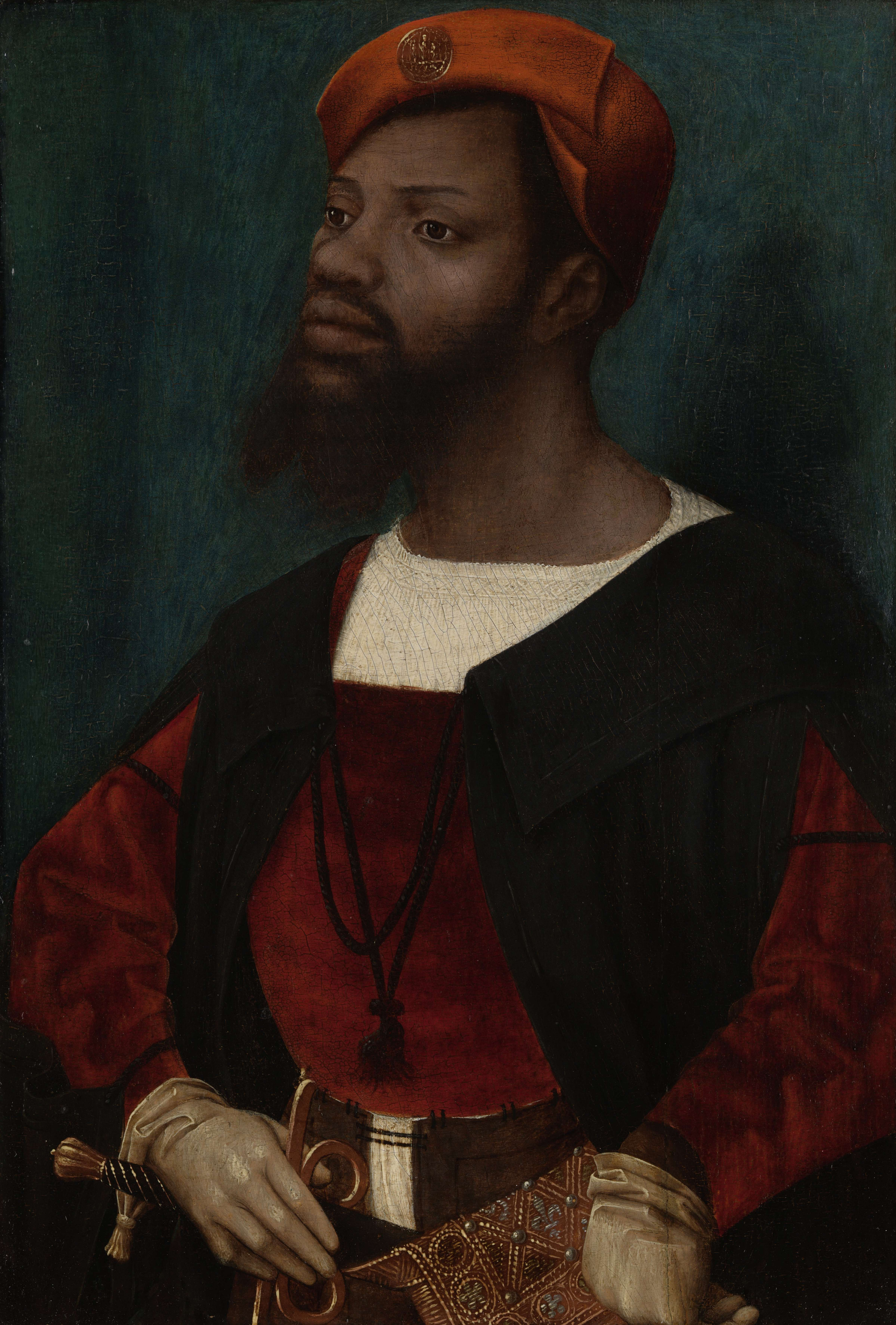
- Artist: Jan Mostaert
- Year: c. 1525–1530
- Type: Oil on oak
- Dimensions: 30.8 cm × 21.2 cm (12.1 in × 8.3 in)
- Location: Rijksmuseum; Amsterdam

The Portrait of an African Man (Dutch: Portret van een Afrikaanse man) also known as Portrait of a Moor (Dutch: Portret van een Moor) is a painting by the Dutch Renaissance painter Jan Mostaert. Mostaert probably made the painting between c. 1525 and 1530, or slightly earlier. The exact subject of the painting has long been unclear, although numerous ideas have been put forward, including that the depicted figure is a soldier, a nobleman or Saint Maurice. The portrait is significant in that it may portray the earliest surviving portrait of a specific black man in European painting, though Saint Maurice, and Balthazar of the Three Kings or Biblical Magi, had long been usually portrayed as Africans.

== Subject ==
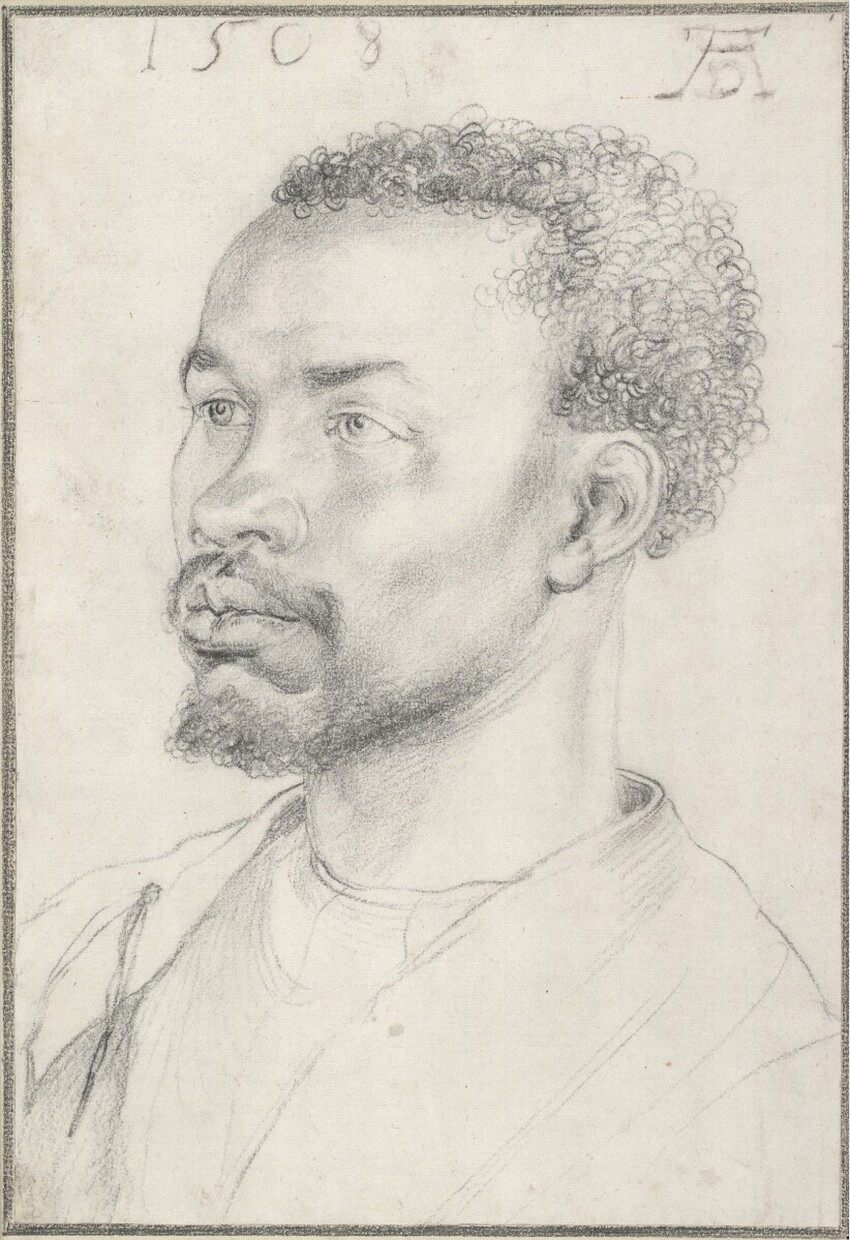
Head of an African, a charcoal drawing by Albrecht Dürer. Dated circa 1508.

If it is a portrait of a specific real individual, it appears to be the earliest known such painting of a black man in European painting. An African Man, a portrait by Albrecht Dürer in the Albertina in Vienna, might be earlier, with a possible date of 1508, but it is a charcoal drawing.

The Rijksmuseum, who own the painting, have said that it might be Christophle le More (Christopher the Moor), a black archer recorded at the court of the Habsburg emperor Charles V. This theory could be supported by the badge of the Virgin on his cap, which would be a souvenir from a pilgrimage to Halle. He has also been said to be a member of the entourage of Margaret of Austria, Duchess of Savoy at her court in Mechelen. The posture, clothing and other details could indicate service at a European court and adaptation to their norms. The English historian Kate Lowe therefore argues he is a nobleman in the service of a visitor to the court at Mechelen, or such a visitor himself. Other scholars suggest that the insignia on his hat and bag may indicate possible Spanish or Portuguese origins.

In 2013, Wim Pijbes, in a discussion on the Dutch folklore figure Zwarte Piet and his origins, mentions the Portrait of an African Man, saying that the figure of Zwarte Piet is traceable to at least the 16th century, and the proud black figure depicted wearing a velvet jacket and a beret shows attributes nowadays associated with the figure of Zwarte Piet.

=== Saint Maurice ===
In November 2014 a different explanation was offered by the literary and medieval scholar Marie-José Govers. She claimed the figure represented Saint Maurice, a Roman soldier who by tradition came from Thebes. Govers was to publish her research in 2015 but did so earlier to refute the remarks of Pijbes. She said that the figure depicted was an important man, not a servant. She bases this on the goatskin gloves, the belt which is covered with gemstones and the sword. She also adds that the sword is especially an attribute of Saint Maurice and that the pilgrim badge of Mary on his red beret makes him a Catholic. Govers adds that the time when the painting was made is also important. Govers claims this to be between 1520 and 1525 (disagreeing with the Rijksmuseum's view that the latter is about the earliest likely date). During that period Martin Luther was seen as a threat by Holy Roman Emperor Charles V and was excommunicated by Pope Leo X in 1520. Struggles between Catholics and Protestants were often violent. The depiction of Saint Maurice, a Christian who refused to fight against other Christians, could be related to this.

The art historian and curator Esther Schreuder disagrees with Govers's findings, stating that the evidence presented by Govers is too meager. Schreuder claims the sword is a typical symbol for a soldier and that Saint Maurice is most often depicted with a holy spear.

Saint Maurice was very often depicted as a black soldier in northern Europe, and the years just before Mostaert's painting had produced such depictions in altarpieces by the leading artists Matthias Grünewald (c. 1517–23) and Lucas Cranach the Elder (1522–25). But the small size of the Mostaert is more typical of a personal portrait.

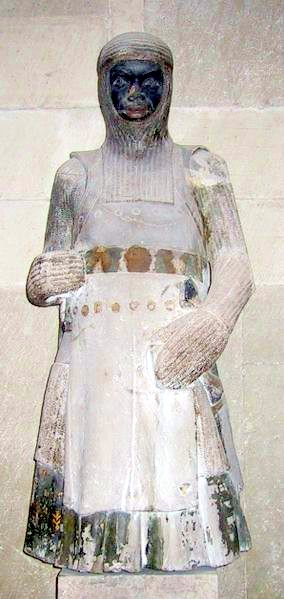
Statue of Saint Maurice, around 1250, Magdeburg Cathedral, Germany

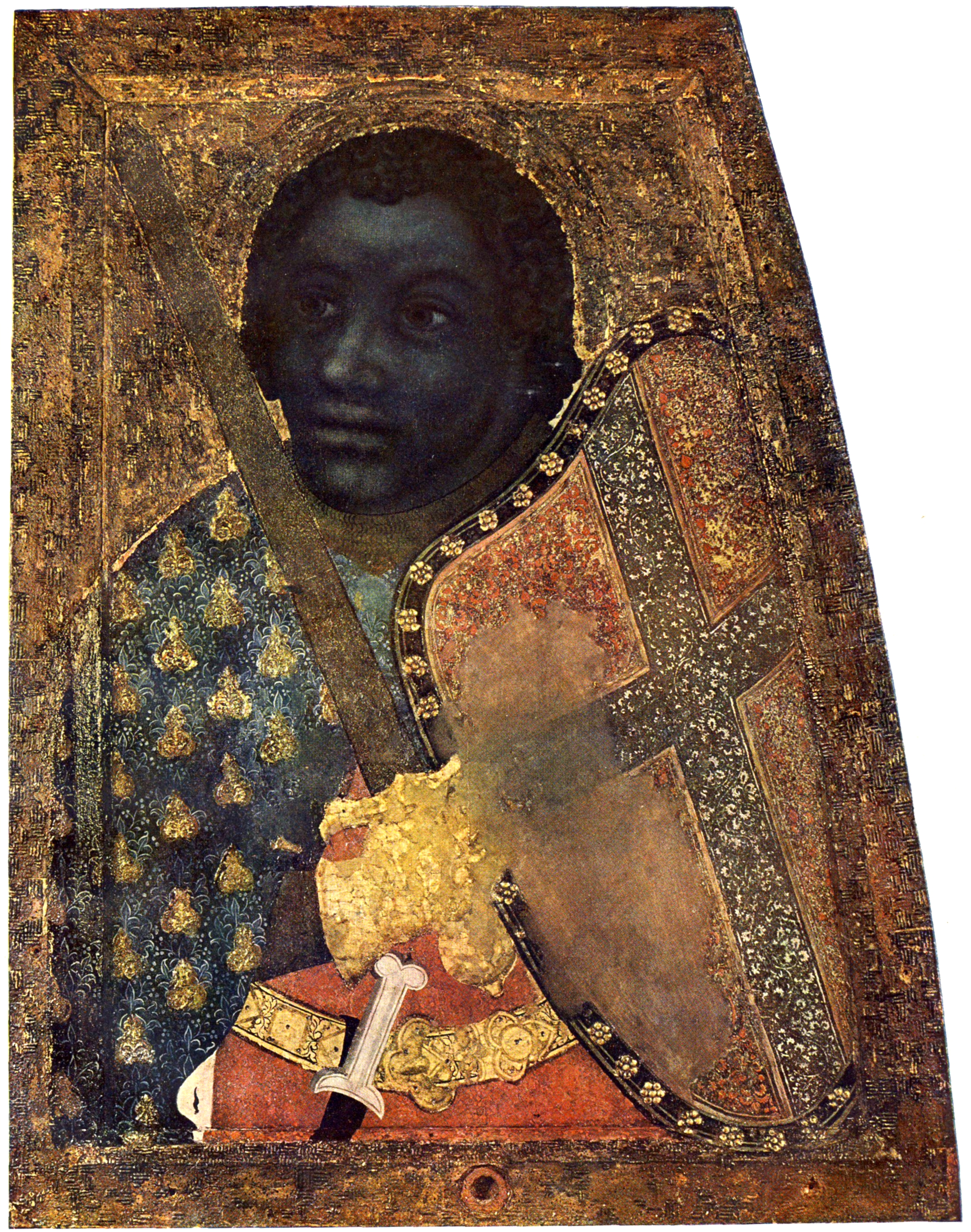
Saint Maurice by Master Theoderic, 1360s

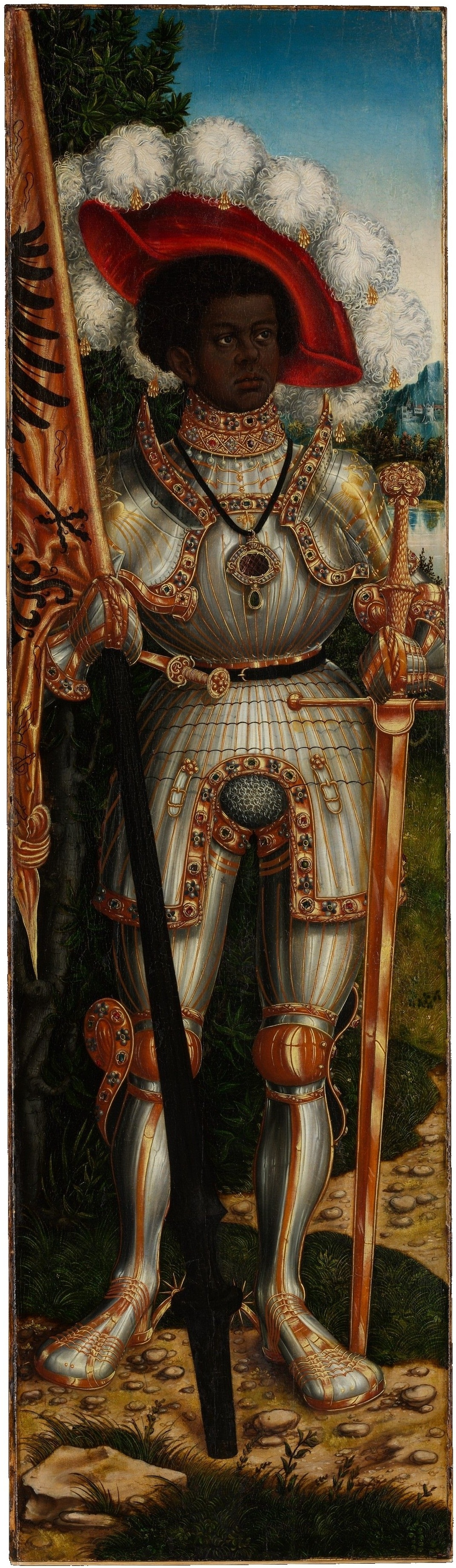
Lucas Cranach the Elder (1522–25)

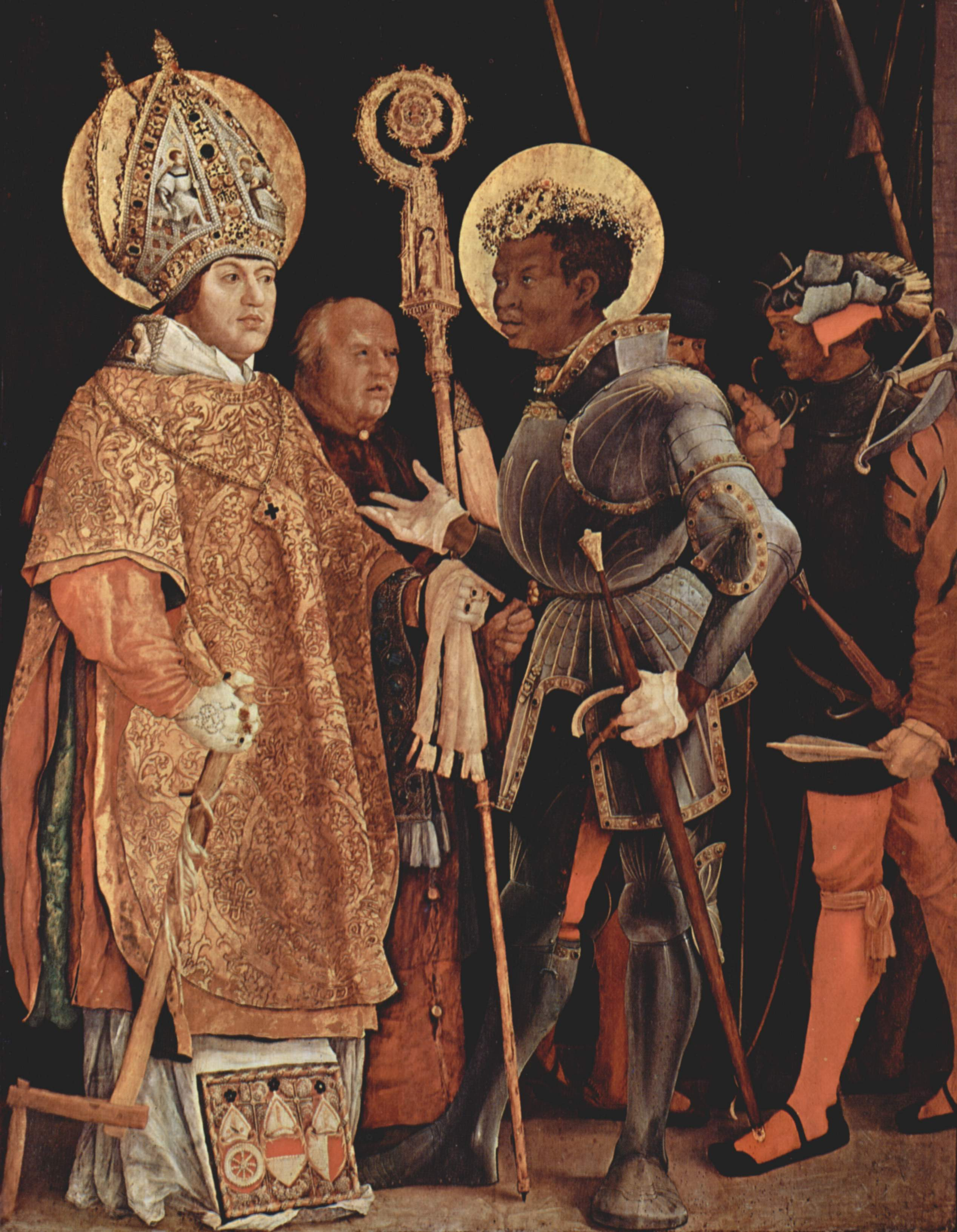
Matthias Grünewald (c. 1517–23)

== Provenance and exhibition history ==
The painting was bought from art dealer Robert Noortman by the Rijksmuseum in June 2005 with financial support of, amongst others, the Rembrandt Foundation. After the purchase, the painting was exhibited in the Museum Boijmans Van Beuningen for some years due to renovations to the Rijksmuseum. It was returned to display in the Rijksmuseum in September 2021.
