= Tessa McWatt =

Guyanese-born Canadian writer

Tessa McWatt FRSL
- McWatt on Bookbits radio
- Born: Georgetown, Guyana
- Education: Queen's University, University of Toronto
- Occupations: Author, professor
- Employer: University of East Anglia
- Writing career
- Notable works: Dragon's Cry (2001); Shame on Me: An Anatomy of Race and Belonging (2020)
- Notable awards: 2020 OCM Bocas Prize for Caribbean Literature – Non-fiction winner

Tessa McWatt FRSL is a Guyanese-born Canadian writer. She has written seven novels and is a creative writing professor at the University of East Anglia in Norwich, United Kingdom. In 2021, she was elected as a Fellow of the Royal Society of Literature.

== Early life ==
McWatt was born in Georgetown, Guyana, and moved to Canada with her family when she was three years old. She was raised in Toronto, where her family embraced the Canadian outdoors through camping, skiing, and canoeing. As a child, McWatt was interested in music, sports, and literature. Even as a child she knew she wanted to be a writer.

== Education ==
McWatt studied English literature at Queen's University and then earned her MA degree at the University of Toronto. Her MA focused on post-colonial literature and explored subject matter like how outsiders are perceived within society and how there are conflicting ideas regarding belonging.

== Career ==
After university, McWatt found employment as an editor and college instructor, while living in Montreal, Paris, and Ottawa. In 1999, she moved to London, England, where she taught creative writing and wrote. She is presently Professor of Creative Writing at the University of East Anglia (UEA), UK.

McWatt is the author of novels, stories, essays and libretto, along with There's No Place Like... (2004) a novella for young adults.

Her first novel was Out of My Skin, the story of an adopted Canadian woman seeking her roots (1998; second edition Cormorant Books, 2012). Her second novel, Dragons Cry (2001), was shortlisted for the City of Toronto Book Awards and the Canadian Governor General's Literary Awards. Her other novels include This Body (HarperCollins, 2004, and Macmillan Caribbean, 2005), Step Closer (HarperCollins 2009), Vital Signs (Random House Canada 2011 and William Heinemann, 2012), which was nominated for the 2012 OCM Bocas Prize for Caribbean Literature, Higher Ed (Random House Canada and Scribe UK, 2015) and The Snow Line (Random House Canada and Scribe UK, 2021), nominated for the Gordon Bowker Volcano Prize.

McWatt provided the libretto for Hannah Kendall's 2016 opera The Knife of Dawn, based on the incarceration of political activist Martin Carter in the then British Guiana in 1953.

She is the co-editor, along with Dionne Brand and Rabindranath Maharaj, of Luminous Ink: Writers on Writing in Canada (Cormorant Books, 2018).

McWatt was one of the winners of the Eccles British Library Award 2018 for her critical memoir Shame on Me: An Anatomy of Race and Belonging, which was also shortlisted for the 2020 Hilary Weston Writers' Trust Prize for Nonfiction, the 2020 Canadian Governor General's Literary Awards for Non-Fiction, and it was the non-fiction winner of the 2020 OCM Bocas Prize for Caribbean Literature.

McWatt's most recent book of non-fiction is The Snag: A Mother, A Forest and Wild Grief (Random House Canada and Scribe UK 2025), about which Cassandra Drudi wrote in Quill & Quire: "It is a story about confronting the changing stages of life, as McWatt travels back and forth between the United Kingdom and Canada to support her family as they grapple with the change in their mother's living situation.... But the personal dovetails with a larger story about the collective grief of humanity as the climate crisis continues to make its presence known with forest fires, devastating heatwaves, droughts, floods, and melting ice sheets." The book won the non-fiction category of the 2026 OCM Bocas Prize for Caribbean Literature.

== Bibliography ==
=== Books ===
Year	Title	Publisher	Awards
1998, 2012	Out of My Skin	Cormorant Books	
2001	Dragon's Cry	Cormorant Books	City of Toronto Book Award (shortlisted), Governor General's Literary Award for Fiction (shortlisted)
2004	There's No Place Like... (novella)	Macmillan Caribbean	
2004, 2005	This Body	HarperCollins, Macmillan Caribbean	
2009	Step Closer	HarperCollins	
2011, 2012	Vital Signs	Random House Canada, Heinemann	OCM Bocas Prize for Caribbean Literature (nominated)
2013	"The Taste of Marmalade" (short story)		
2015	Higher Ed	Random House Canada, Scribe UK	
2018	Luminous Ink (anthology)	Cormorant Books	
2019/20	Shame on Me: An Anatomy of Race and Belonging	Scribe UK, Random House Canada	Eccles British Library Award 2018, OCM Bocas Prize for Caribbean Literature (nominated), Hilary Weston Writers' Trust Prize for Nonfiction (finalist)
2020	Where Are You Agnes?	Groundwood Books	
2022	The Snow Line	Scribe UK	Shortlisted for Gordon Bowker Volcano Prize for a travel-based novel
2025	The Snag: A Mother, A Forest and Wild Grief	Random House Canada	Guyana Prize for Literature's Non-Fiction award and OCM Bocas Prize for Caribbean Literature

=== Essays and reporting ===
- McWatt, Tessa (18 July 2008). "But the rose fell on Azor's Paw". Wasafiri. 17 (35): 51–56. doi:10.1080/02690050208589774. S2CID 162914405.
- McWatt, Tessa (3–23 April 2020). "The slave and master inside me". Personal Story. New Statesman. 149 (5514): 52.
- Taneja, Preti; Tessa McWatt (22 October 2020). "SHAME ON ME: Professor Tessa McWatt in Conversation with Dr Preti Taneja". Feminist Review. 126 (1): 139–145. doi:10.1177/0141778920942761.

== Sources ==
- Beckford, Sharon Morgan. Naturally Woman: The Search for Self in Black Canadian Women's Literature. Toronto: Inanna, 2011. [Chapter 4 provides a reading of McWatt's Out of My Skin as a fiction about the issues of individuation that black female characters face as immigrants to Canada.]
- Lacombe, Michèle. "Embodying the Glocal. Immigrant and Indigenous Ideas of Home in Tessa McWatt's Montreal." In Ana María Fraile-Marcos, ed., Literature and the Glocal City. London: Routledge, 2014. 39–54. [Lacombe analyses the writer's account of the Oka crisis in Out of My Skin and the main character's problematic reliance on Indigenous spirituality.]
