= Hannah Kendall =

British composer

Hannah Kendall (born May 1984 in London) is a British composer currently based in New York.

== Background and career ==
Kendall grew up in Wembley, where her mother is the head teacher in a primary school. One of two children, her family is originally from Guyana. Her grandfather was a jazz musician and her family stimulated her interest in the creative arts. Kendall attended the University of Exeter where she majored in vocal studies and composition, studying with Joe Duddell. She also gained a Masters at the Royal College of Music, studying with Kenneth Hesketh, as well as arts management at the Royal Welsh College of Music and Drama. Her doctorate was completed at Columbia University in the City of New York with Georg Friedrich Haas and George E. Lewis. Her music is published by Ricordi (Berlin).

In 2015, Kendall was noted as one of the "brilliant female composers under the age of 35". She featured on BBC Radio 3's Composer of the Week. All five composers of the week were women and this was part of Radio 3's International Women's Day celebrations, which were highlighted in The Guardian. Also in 2015 Kendall won a 'Women of the Future Award' in the Arts and Culture category.

Her one-man chamber opera The Knife of Dawn, with a libretto by Tessa McWatt and based on the incarceration of political activist Martin Carter in the then British Guiana in 1953 was premiered in 2016 at the Roundhouse.

Her piece The Spark Catchers premiered at the BBC Proms in August 2017 and is inspired by the work of poet Lemn Sissay. The performance was released on CD by NMC in January 2020. Kendall returned to the Proms for the delayed first night of live music (due to the pandemic) on 28 August 2020 with the world premiere of Tuxedo: Vasco 'de' Gama for orchestra, inspired by the work of the artist Jean-Michel Basquiat.

Kendall received the 2022 Hindemith Prize for music composition which is awarded to outstanding composers as part of the Schleswig-Holstein Musik Festival.

Kendall has worked for both the Barbican and London Music Masters charity in arts management roles.

Kendall received an Ivor Novello Award nomination at The Ivors Classical Awards 2022. Rosalind for soprano, baritone and piano, was nominated for Best Small Chamber Ensemble Composition.

Kendall received two Ivor Novello Award nominations at The Ivors Classical Awards 2023. Even sweetness can scratch the throat, for chamber ensemble was nominated for Best Chamber Ensemble Composition and shouting forever into the receiver, for 17 players, was nominated for Best Large Ensemble Composition. shouting forever into the receiver went on to win the Ivor Novello Award for Best Large Ensemble Composition. shouting forever into the receiver was the title track of Kendall's debut portrait album released by NMC in June 2025. John Fallas of Gramophone Magazine described it as a 'complex, dense, but never less than compelling imbrication of idea and sound in this important body of work'.

Kendall received an Ivor Novello Award nomination at The Ivors Classical Awards 2024. Tuxedo: Dust Bowl #3 for massed ensemble of harmonicas and optional SATB voices was nominated for Best Community and Participation Composition.

== Selected works ==
=== Orchestral and large ensemble works ===
- The Spark Catchers (2017)
- Disillusioned Dreamer (2018)
- Verdala (2018) (large ensemble)
- Nexus (2020)
- Tuxedo: Vasco 'de' Gama (2020)
- Where is the chariot of fire? (2020) (large ensemble)
- shouting forever into the receiver (2022) (large ensemble)
- ...I may turn to salt (2023) (large ensemble)
- O flower of fire (2023)
- He stretches out the north over the void and hangs the earth on nothing (2024)
- And At Pains To Temper The Light (2024) (large ensemble)

=== Chamber and solo works ===
- Incident (2011) (text by Fleur Adcock) for soprano and piano
- On the Chequer'd Field Array'd (2013) for piano
- Processional (2018) for piano
- Glances / I don't belong here: (2019) for string quartet
- Rosalind (2020) (text by Sabrina Mahfouz) for soprano, baritone and piano
- Tuxedo: Hot Summer No Water (2020) for cello
- Tuxedo: (Copper); Ivory Mask (2021) for oboe and prepared piano
- Tuxedo: Crown; Sun King (2021) for prepared violin
- Tuxedo: Diving Bell 2. (2021) for prepared harp
- this is but an oration of loss (2022) (text by M. NourbeSe Philip) for soprano, mezzo-soprano, alto, tenor, baritone and bass
- Tuxedo: Between Carnival and Lent (2022) for voice and ensemble
- Weroon Weroon (2022) for prepared violin
- How ruin nested inside each thimbled throat / & made it sing (2022) for prepared string quartet
- yes, flash bright lightning in my southern sky! (2023) for two oboe reeds and three wind-up music boxes
- Even sweetness can scratch the throat (2023) for mixed ensemble
- Gilt (2024) for saxophone quartet
- when flesh is pressed against the dark (2024) for trumpet, voice, bass clarinet and trombone
- hounded earth (2025) for prepared string quartet

=== Choral works ===
- Fundamental (2010) (text by Rick Holland) for chorus and brass quintet
- Regina Caeli (2014) for a cappella chorus
- Tuxedo: Dust Bowl #1 (2021) for a cappella chorus

=== Operas ===
- The Knife of Dawn (text by Tessa McWatt) for solo baritone, 2 sopranos, alto, violin, viola, cello and harp

=== Installations ===
- Hand-en-Veldt (2021) for 100 wind-up music boxes
- Tuxedo: Dust Bowl #3 (2022) for massed ensemble of harmonicas and optional SATB voices
- You carve & carve until a coin of light appears (2024) for prepared strings
