= Peter Kalu =

British writer (born 1962)

- Born: 1962 (age 63–64); Manchester, United Kingdom
- Education: University of Leeds; Lancaster University (PhD)
- Occupations: Writer, editor, storyteller, mentor
- Writing career
- Pen name: Carl Peters
- Period: 1987–
- Website: peterkalu.com

Peter Kalu (born 1962), also known as Pete Kalu, is a British playwright, poet, novelist and mentor from Manchester. He was chief executive officer for Commonword from 2008 until 2026, and convened their biannual Black and Asian Writer's Conference. He was writer-in-residence at the University of the West Indies at St. Augustine and is a Reading Fellow of the Royal Literary Fund. He was elected a Fellow of the Royal Society for the Arts in 2013.

== Biography ==
Peter Kalu was born to a Danish mother and Nigerian family in what he describes as a "political" family. As a young person growing up in Manchester, he witnessed the 1980s protests against police brutality and campaigned about several causes, such as the Biafra–Nigeria war. He was inspired by the Black Power and Black Consciousness movements, and figures such as Stokely Carmichael and Steve Biko, as well as by Danish approaches to education and social interconnectedness. During his teens, he joined a revolutionary circus, before exploring with West African and Yoruba mythology.

Kalu has lived in the Hulme, Moss Side and Didsbury areas of Manchester, as well as Edinburgh, Leeds, Lagos, Abia State, and San Francisco. He is trained in kung fu. Kalu worked as a translator of French and Spanish into English, and as a glass collector in the Leeds pub The Shoulder of Mutton.

Kalu studied law at the University of Leeds, funded by the 1987 Marcus Garvey Scholarship Award. He is also qualified in marketing, web design and software programming. He was also in a band called Moko Jumbi, which performed at Manchester Carnival. In 2017, he was invited to visit the 9th Association for the Study of the Worldwide African Diaspora (ASWAD) conference as part of Speaking Volumes, Breaking Ground: British Writers of Colour, and judged the Saif Ghobash Banipal Prize for Arabic Literary Translation. In 2019, he completed a PhD in creative writing from Lancaster University in 2019. Kalu was writer-in-residence at the University of the West Indies at St. Augustine. He is a Reading Fellow of the Royal Literary Fund, and was elected a Fellow of the Royal Society of Arts in 2013.

== Writing and editing ==
Peter Kalu has been writing since 1987, when he was published in ''Poetic Licence: Poems by Writers from the Greater Manchester Area. Kalu did not initially see himself as a writer, but began to write after being inspired by Black writers such as Lemn Sissay, Maya Angelou and Alice Walker. He subsequently joined Moss Side Write, a workshop for Black and Asian writers in Manchester, organised by Commonword. He initially started with poetry, before going on to write plays, short stories, and novels as well. Kalu has said that spoken word and performance poetry were largely denigrated when he began writing, but that they were easier for Black writers to get into than publishing, which was not very diverse at the time. He would later go on to perform hundreds of storytelling sessions at schools, libraries, and community centres around the country.

Kalu's first publication was the detective story The Adventures of Maud Mellington Part 1: Dirty laundry, about an NHS nurse in Manchester from the Windrush generation, in Black and Priceless (1988). This was followed by his Ambrose Patterson and Delroy Johnson stories, which followed a Black police officer in a racist police force and a "down-at-heel" private investigator who attempted to bring justice to those the justice system had overlooked, respectively.

Around 1990, he had two radio plays broadcast: Xango's Challenge and AfroGoth, which were influenced by his interest in superhero comics and West African mythology. In 1992, Kalu joined Commonword as their development worker. In December 1993 and October 1995, he published the thrillers Lick Shot and Professor X. In November 1996, Mongrel Press published his collection of poems, Mongrel Moon. In June 1998, he published the science fiction novel Black Star Rising, about a Black crew dealing with an extinction event. In 1998, he published the romantic comedy Diary of a Househusband under the pen name "Carl Peters".

In September 2002 and November 2007, he published Yard Dogs and Little Jack Horner, both thrillers. He published Silent Striker, which is partly autobiographical, in July 2015 and Being Me, about a girl who plays football, in September. In October 2015, his short story "Getting Home (The Proofreader's Sigh)" was published in Closure.

In 2021, Kalu was a judge on the 2021 Book of the Year Prize judging committee for the Jhalak Prize, along with Yvonne Battle-Felton and Louise Doughty. In February 2022, Kalu's story "Hermione" appeared in The Cuckoo Cage: New Origin Stories. The story creates a new superhero, Hermione, based on the crew of the HMS Hermione, who mutinied against Captain Hugh Pigot in 1797.

On 8 July 2022, Andersen Press announced it had signed Peter Kalu's dystopian young adult novel One Drop, set in the same world as Three Bullets by Melvin Burgess. The book was published on 4 August 2022 and was also issued as part of a dystopian bundle with Three Bullets for the Young Adult Literature Convention. The book is one of a series, created with Burgess and Tariq Mehmood, to explore a war-torn future Britain run by "The Bloods", far-right extremists and white supremacists who run a regressive, high-surveillance police state. Kalu said: "Like all my YA books, One Drop is also a letter to my youngest daughter in case I kick the bucket." On 11 August 2022, Kalu edited Writers Mosaic's Gasping for Breath: Black crime fiction podcast series, that included interviews about Black crime fiction and readings of short stories by Black authors in the crime genre, including Dipali Das, Yvvette Edwards, Saima Mir, Nii Ayikwei Parkes, Jacqueline Roy, Shahireh Sharif, and Karline Smith.

In 2024, Kalu was published in Encounters with James Baldwin, an anthology of writers influenced by Baldwin's work, edited by Kadija Sesay and Cheryl Robson. Kalu was also part of the writing team for the role-playing game Simulacrum Funk, which was launched at the International Black Speculative Writing Festival in London, 2–4 February 2024. On 23 October 2025, Kalu published his memoir Act Normal with HopeRoad Publishing, and launched a series of videos and podcasts in support of its release.

== Reception ==
Benjamin Zephaniah said that, in Black Star Rising, Kalu was "the first imagination to see space and science fiction through afro-centric eyes. Somewhere in the future, earthlings will look back and say Peter Kalu was the first."

== Awards and honours ==
- 1988: Marcus Garvey Scholarship Award
- 1991: BBC Young Playwrights Award
- 1995: New Horizons Award
- 2000: Black Film Festival Award for No Trace
- 2002: Liverpool Black Film Festival Award
- 2002: Kodak/Liverpool Film Festival Award for No Trace
- 2003: BBC/Contact Theatre's Dangerous Comedy Script Award for Pants
- 2003: Bradford International Short Play Competition for Hills, Trees, Green Stuff
- 2004: Cumbria Play Programme for Hills, Trees, Green Stuff
- The Voice/Marcus Garvey Essay Award
- 2024: Society of Authors Travelling Scholarship Award

== Bibliography ==
=== Anthologies ===
==== Fiction anthologies ====
- "The Adventures of Maud Mellington" in Black and Priceless (Manchester: Crocus, 1988)
- "High Roller" in Playing Sidney Poitier and other stories (SAKS Publications, 1999)
- "The Making of a Revolutionary" in Moss Side Stories (Crocus, 2012)
- "Getting Home (The Proofreader's Sigh)" in Closure: Contemporary Black British Fiction, edited by Jacob Ross (Leeds: Peepal Tree Press, 2015)
- "Sana the Referee" in A Country to Call Home, edited by Lucy Popescu (Unbound, 2017)
- "The Keeper of Books" in Seaside Special, edited by Jenn Ashworth (Hebden Bridge: Bluemoose Books, 2017)
- "Fall of the House of Penrhyn" in Glimpse: Contemporary Black British Speculative Fiction, edited by Leone Ross (Leeds: Peepal Tree Press, 2022)
- "Hermione" in The Cuckoo Cage: New Origin Stories, edited by Ra Page (Manchester: Comma Press, 2022)

==== Poetry anthologies ====
- 2Don't Think to Raid Ras-Ta Fari's Soul", "Dusty Rivers", "The Actor", and "Jealous Lover Talk" in Poetic Licence: Poems by Writers from the Greater Manchester Area (Manchester: Commonword, 1987)
- "Life Forms", "African Ark" and "Dodos and Afrikaners" in Black and Priceless (Manchester: Crocus, 1988)
- "The Poet's Song" in KISS (Crocus, 1994)
- "Old Radicals", in Red: Contemporary Black British Poetry, edited by Kwame Dawes (Leeds: Peepal Tree Press, 2010)
- "The Poet's Song" in Out of Bounds, edited by Jackie Kay, James Procter and Gemma Robinson (Bloodaxe Books, 2012)
- "How You Wear Your Hat" in The Hat You Wear (Manchester: Comma Press, 2012)
- "The Negro Speaks of Blood Transfusions" in Filigree: Contemporary Black British Poetry, edited by Nii Ayikwei Parkes (Leeds: Peepal Tree Press, 2018)

=== Memoir and nonfiction ===
- "Richard Watt the First, Merchantt" in Colonial Countryside, edited by Corinne Fowler (Leeds: Peepal Tree Press, 2022)
- Encounters with James Baldwin, edited by Kadija Sesay and Cheryl Robson (London: Aurora Metro Publications, 2024)
- Act Normal (HopeRoad Publishing, 2025)

=== Novels ===
- Lick Shot (The X Press, 1993)
- Professor X (The X Press, 1995)
- Black Star Rising (The X Press, 1998)
- Diary of a Househusband (as Carl Peters; The X Press, 1998)
- Yard Dogs (The X-Press, 2002)
- Little Jack Horner (Suitcase Press, 2007)

=== Poetry ===
- Mongrel Moon (Mongrel Press, 1996)
- Poetry monologues for Commonwealth Games "aftershock2 project, 2002
- Rekindled (poetry monologues), Manchester Museum, June 2003
- No Trace (poetry monologues), Lychee Lounge, Green Room, Manchester, October 2003

=== Young adult ===
- Silent Striker (HopeRoad Publishing, 2015)
- Being Me (HopeRoad Publishing, 2015)
- Zombie XI – The Boy Who Got Sick of Warming the Bench (HopeRoad Publishing, 2017)
- One Drop (Ruled Britannia Book 2) (Andersen Press, 2022)

== Scripts ==
=== Radio plays ===
- Afrogoth, BBC Radio 4's Young Playwrights Festival, 1991
- Xango's Challenge, BBC Radio 3, 12 August 1995

=== Short films ===
- Revenge Is Ras Malai, 2003
- No Trace, Migrant Media, 2007

=== Stage plays ===
- Taxi, Manchester Town Hall, 1994
- Downfall, Manchester University Theatre, 1995
- Gabrielle (monologue, with Shirley May), Pumphouse Museum/People's History Museum, Manchester, 2002
- Pants (comedy), Contact Theatre, Manchester, 2003
- Hills, Trees, Green Stuff, Cumbria, 2004
- The Bay (duologue), Contact Theatre, Manchester, 2006

=== Teleplays ===
- Script consultant, BBC Children, Jamie Johnson, Series 6 (airing 2021)
- Scriptwriter, BBC Children, Jamie Johnson, Series 7, Episode 3 (airing 2022)
