= Bare Lit Festival =

Literature festival in London, 2016–2020

Bare Lit Festival was an annual literature festival featuring writers of colour held in London, England between 2016 and 2020. It took place over two days each Spring. It was founded in 2016 and is notable as the UK's first crowdfunded festival to take place, raising over £7700 by 291 individual supporters. Additionally, according to The Guardian, the festival was the first in the UK to focus on minority writers. The inaugural festival was held at the Free Word Centre and the Betsey Trotwood in Farringdon, London, and included more than 30 writers of international backgrounds. The 2017 festival featured over 60 writers, with panelists discussing topics such as food writing, Erotica literature and the art and craft of editing. The festival was supported by organisations including Spread the Word, The Royal Literary Fund, Apples & Snakes and Arvon. The last festival was in 2020, and was a virtual event.

== History ==
Bare Lit Festival was a literature festival featuring writers of colour held in London, England. It was an annual festival, taking place over two days of Spring from 2016 to 2020. It was founded in 2016 by Samantha Asumadu, Mend Mariwany, Henna Zamurd-Butt and Samira Sawlani. The event is notable as the UK's first crowdfunded festival to take place, raising over £7700 by 291 individual supporters. Additionally, according to The Guardian, the festival was the first in the UK to focus on minority writers.

=== 2016 event ===
The inaugural festival was held from 26 to 28 February 2016 at the Free Word Centre and the Betsey Trotwood in Farringdon, London, and included more than 30 writers of international backgrounds. The festival was noted in The New York Times as a collection of panels, presentations, and conversations aimed to discuss issues relevant to Black and Asian authors and writers.

=== 2017 event ===
The festival took place a second time in April 2017 and featured over 60 writers, with panelists discussing topics such as food writing, Erotica literature and the art and craft of editing. The festival was supported by organisations including Spread the Word, The Royal Literary Fund, Apples & Snakes and Arvon.

In April 2017 an anthology of writing was published by Brain Mill Press to raise funds for the festival. The anthology was edited by Kavita Bhanot, Courttia Newland, and Bare Lit Festival cofounder Mend Mariwany.

=== 2018 event ===
The 2018 Bare Lit was held 25–27 May 2018 at the Albany Theatre in Deptford, and was sponsored by Hachette and The Royal Literary Fund. The event included a performance of a new drama by Annette Brook, Gala Mae, performed by Matchstick Theatre. Authors featured at the festival include Preti Taneja, Guy Gunaratne, and Nii Ayikwei Parkes.

=== 2019 event ===
The fourth event, in 2019, was again held at the Albany Theatre in Deptford, and was sponsored by Hachette. The keynote speaker was Ben Okri, and there was a panel of writers longlisted for the Jhalak Prize 2019, including Charlie Brinkhurst-Cuff, Onjali Rauf and poet Roy McFarlane. A children's literature event was included for the first time.

=== 2020 event ===
The 2020 event was held as a free virtual event, due to COVID-19 pandemic restrictions. It featured writers Davina Tijani and Isha Karki, Ruth Harrison and Bobby Nayyar.
