= Jhalak Prize =

British literary award

- Awarded for: Book of the year by a writer of colour
- Country: United Kingdom
- Reward: £1,000
- First award: 2017; 9 years ago
- Website: Official website

The Jhalak Prize for Book of the Year by a Writer of Colour is an annual literary prize awarded to British or British-resident BAME writers. £1,000 is awarded to the sole winner.

The Jhalak Prize was launched in 2016 and was created by writers Sunny Singh, Nikesh Shukla, and Media Diversified. It is supported by The Authors’ Club and by The Jhalak Foundation, owned by Professor Singh's family. The prize and foundation are named after Professor Singh's grandmother. It is the second literary prize in the UK to only accept entries by writers of colour, following the SI Leeds Literary Prize for BAME women writers, which was first awarded in 2012. In 2017, the comedian Shappi Khorsandi withdrew her novel from the longlist because she said she felt that "my skin colour was up for an award rather than my book". Consequentially, the prize was reported to the Equality and Human Rights Commission, but the complaint was not upheld, and the Equality and Human Rights Commission stated in 2017 that "this award is the type of action which the Commission supports and recommends".

In 2020, a sister award, the Jhalak Children’s & YA Prize, was founded.

From 2025 onwards the prize was divided into two separate awards for prose and poetry.

== Jhalak Prize (2017–2024) recipients ==
Jhalak Prize winners and shortlists
Year	Author	Title	Publisher	Result	Ref.
2017 (Note: The 2017 judges were Sunny Singh, Catherine Johnson, Yvvette Edwards, Musa Okwonga, and Alex Wheatle.)	Jacob Ross	The Bone Readers		Winner	
2017	Kiran Millwood Hargrave	The Girl of Ink and Stars	The Chicken House	Shortlist	
2017	Abir Mukherjee	A Rising Man	Harvill Secker	Shortlist	
2017	Irenosen Okojie	Speak Gigantular	Jacaranda Books	Shortlist	
2017	David Olusoga	Black and British: A Forgotten History	Macmillan Publishers	Shortlist	
2017	Gary Younge	Another Day In The Death Of America	Faber	Shortlist	
2018 (Note: The 2018 judges were Sunny Singh, Catherine Johnson, Tanya Byrne, Vera Chok, and Noo Saro-Wiwa.)	Reni Eddo-Lodge	Why I'm No Longer Talking to White People About Race		Winner	
2018	Nadeem Aslam	The Golden Legend	Faber	Shortlist	
2018	Kayo Chingonyi	Kumukanda	Chatto & Windus	Shortlist	
2018	Xiaolu Guo	Once Upon a Time in the East	Chatto & Windus	Shortlist	
2018	Meena Kandasamy	When I Hit You: Or, A Portrait of the Writer as a Young Wife	Atlantic Books	Shortlist	
2018	Kiran Millwood-Hargrave	The Island at the End of Everything	The Chicken House	Shortlist	
2019 (Note: The 2019 judges were Anna Perera, Sabrina Mahfouz, Sarah Shaffi, and Siana Bangura.)	Guy Gunaratne	In Our Mad and Furious City		Winner	
2019	Akala	Natives: Race and Class in the Ruins of Empire	Two Roads	Shortlist	
2019	Roma Agrawal	Built: The Hidden Stories Behind Our Structures	Bloomsbury	Shortlist	
2019	Raymond Antrobus	The Perseverance	Penned in the Margins	Shortlist	
2019	Aminatta Forna	Happiness	Bloomsbury	Shortlist	
2019	Onjali Q. Raúf	The Boy at the Back of the Class	Orion Children's Books	Shortlist	
2020 (Note: The 2020 judges were Roy McFarlane, Anita Sethi, Nikesh Shukla, and Kerry Young.)	Johny Pitts	Afropean: Notes From Black Europe		Winner	
2020	Dean Atta	The Black Flamingo	Hodder Children's	Shortlist	
2020	Yvonne Battle-Felton	Remembered	Dialogue Books	Shortlist	
2020	Candice Carty-Williams	Queenie	Orion	Shortlist	
2020	Mary Jean Chan	Flèche	Faber	Shortlist	
2020	Romesh Gunesekera	Suncatcher	Bloomsbury	Shortlist	
2021 (Note: The 2021 judges were Yvonne Battle-Felton, Louise Doughty and Peter Kalu.)	Jennifer Nansubuga Makumbi	The First Woman		Winner	
2021	Romalyn Ante	Antiemetic for Homesickness	Chatto & Windus	Shortlist	
2021	Catherine Cho	Inferno	Bloomsbury	Shortlist	
2021	Rachel Long	My Darling From the Lions	Picador	Shortlist	
2021	Katy Massey	Are We Home Yet	Jacaranda Books	Shortlist	
2021	Paul Mendez	Rainbow Milk	Dialogue Books	Shortlist	
2022 (Note: The 2022 judges were Mary Jean Chan, Chimene Suleyman and Stephen S. Thompson.)	Sabba Khan	The Roles We Play		Winner	
2022	Arifa Akbar	Consumed	Sceptre	Shortlist	
2022	Mona Arshi	Somebody Loves You	And Other Stories	Shortlist	
2022	Vahni Capildeo	Like a Tree, Walking	Carcenet Press	Shortlist	
2022	Tice Cin	Keeping the House	And Other Stories	Shortlist	
2022	Kei Miller	Things I Have Withheld	Canongate Books	Shortlist	
2023 (Note: The 2023 judges were Haleh Agar, Yaba Badoe, Anthony Vahni Capildeo, Maisie Chan, Irfan Master and Monisha Rajesh.)	Travis Alabanza	None of the Above		Winner	
2023	Ayanna Lloyd Banwo	When We Were Birds	Hamish Hamilton	Shortlist	
2023	Angela Hui	Takeaway	Trapeze	Shortlist	
2023	Paterson Joseph	The Secret Diaries of Charles Ignatius Sancho	Dialogue Books	Shortlist	
2023	Sheena Patel	I'm a Fan	Rough Trade Books	Shortlist	
2023	Anita Pati	Hiding to Nothing	Liverpool University Press	Shortlist	
2024 (Note: The 2024 judges were Anni Domingo, Danielle Jawando, Stella Oni, J. P. Rose, Denise Saul and Rashmi Sirdeshpande.)	Yepoka Yeebo	Anansi's Gold: The man who swindled the world	Bloomsbury	Winner	
2024	Jason Allen-Paisant	Self-Portrait as Othello	Carcanet	Shortlist	
2024	Elizabeth-Jane Burnett	Twelve Words for Moss	Penguin	Shortlist	
2024	Jacqueline Crooks	Fire Rush	Vintage	Shortlist	
2024	Noreen Masud	A Flat Place	Penguin	Shortlist	
2024	Ami Rao	Boundary Road	Everything With Words	Shortlist	

== Prose Prize ==
Jhalak Prose Prize winners and shortlists
Year	Author	Title	Result	Ref.
2025	N.S. Nuseibeh	Namesake	Winner	
2025	Maame Blue	The Rest of You	Shortlist	
2025	Aniefiok Ekpoudom	Where We Come From	Shortlist	
2025	Ashani Lewis	Everest	Shortlist	
2025	Hisham Matar	My Friends	Shortlist	
2025	Varaidzo	Manny and the Baby	Shortlist	
2026	Diana Evans	I Want to Talk to You	Winner	
2026	Tash Aw	The South	Shortlist	
2026	Funmi Fetto	Hail Mary	Shortlist	
2026	Katie Goh	Foreign Fruit	Shortlist	
2026	Xiaolu Guo	Call Me Ishmaelle	Shortlist	
2026	Pete Kalu	Act Normal: Joy and Despair in Postcolonial Britain	Shortlist	

== Poetry Prize ==
Jhalak Poetry Prize winners and shortlists
Year	Author	Title	Result	Ref.
2025	Mimi Khalvati	Collected Poems	Winner	
2025	Amaan Hyder	Self-Portrait with Family	Shortlist	
2025	Karen McCarthy Woolf	Top Doll	Shortlist	
2025	Gboyega Odubanjo	Adam	Shortlist	
2025	Azad Ashim Sharma	Boiled Owls	Shortlist	
2025	Rushika Wick	Horse	Shortlist	
2026	Maggie Harris	I Sing to the Greenhearts	Winner	
2026	Ashley Hickson-Lovence	Why I am not a bus driver	Shortlist	
2026	Sarah Howe	Foretokens	Shortlist	
2026	Lady Red Ego	My Dearest Friend	Shortlist	
2026	Nick Makoha	The New Carthaginians	Shortlist	
2026	Andrés N. Ordorica	Holy Boys	Shortlist	

== Children's and Young Adult Prize recipients ==
Jhalak Children's and Young Adult Prize winners and shortlists
Year	Author	Title	Publisher	Result	Ref.
2021	Patrice Lawrence	Eight Pieces of Silva		Winner	
2021	Nii Ayikwei Parkes and Avril Filomeno	The GA Picture Alphabet	Kane Series	Shortlist	
2021	Kereen Getten	When Life Gives You Mangoes	Pushkin Children's	Shortlist	
2021	Danielle Jawando	And the Stars Were Burning Brightly	Simon & Schuster	Shortlist	
2021	Catherine Johnson	Queen of Freedom	Pushkin Children's	Shortlist	
2021	Margaret Sturton	A Fox Called Herbert	Andersen Press	Shortlist	
2022	Maisie Chan	Danny Chung Does Not Do Maths	Piccadilly Press	Winner	
2022	Faridah Àbíké-Íyímídé	Ace of Spades	Usborne Publishing	Shortlist	
2022	Malorie Blackman and Dapo Adeola	We're Going to Find the Monster	Puffin Books	Shortlist	
2022	Jeffrey Boakye, illus by Ngadi Smart	The Musical Truth: A Musical History of Modern Black Britain in 28 Songs	Faber	Shortlist	
2022	Rebecca Henry	The Sound of Everything	Everything With Words	Shortlist	
2022	Manjeet Mann	The Crossing	Penguin	Shortlist	
2023	Danielle Jawando	When our Worlds Collided	Simon & Schuster	Winner	
2023	Lucy Farfort	In Our Hands	Tate	Shortlist	
2023	Janelle McCurdy, illus by Ana Latese	Mia and the Lightcasters	Faber	Shortlist	
2023	Christine Pillainayagam	Ellie Pillai Is Brown	Faber	Shortlist	
2023	Ann Sei Lin	Rebel Skies	Walker Books	Shortlist	
2023	Rashmi Sirdeshpande, illus. by Ruchi Mhasane	Dadaji’s Paintbrush	Andersen Press	Shortlist	
2024	Hiba Noor Khan	Safiyyah's War	Andersen Press	Winner	
2024	Nadia Shireen	Geoffrey Gets The Jitters	Penguin Random House	Shortlist	
2024	Benjamin Dean	How to Die Famous	Simon & Schuster	Shortlist	
2024	Nathaneal Lessore	Steady for This	Hot Key Books	Shortlist	
2024	Erika Meza	To the Other Side	Hachette Children's	Shortlist	
2024	Candy Gourlay	Wild Song	David Fickling	Shortlist	
2025	Nathanael Lessore	King of Nothing		Winner	
2025	Lanisha Butterfield and Hoang Giang	Flower Block		Shortlist	
2025	Dev Kothari	Bringing Back Kay-Kay		Shortlist	
2025	Ayaan Mohamud	The Thread That Connects Us		Shortlist	
2025	Chibundu Onuzo	Mayowa and the Sea of Words		Shortlist	
2025	Ashley Thorpe	The Thread That Connects Us		Shortlist	
2026	Fidan Meikle	My Name is Samim		Winner	
2026	Truly Johnston	The Shell Keepers		Shortlist	
2026	Manjeet Mann	Roar		Shortlist	
2026	Chanté Timothy	Supa Nova		Shortlist	
2026	Kenechi Udogu	Augmented		Shortlist	
2026	Forest Xiao	How to Catch an Idea		Shortlist	
