= The Bone Readers =

2016 Jacob Ross novel

- First edition cover
- Author: Jacob Ross
- Language: English
- Series: Camaho Quartet
- Subject: racism, grief
- Genre: Novel, crime fiction
- Set in: Caribbean and London
- Publisher: Peepal Tree Press
- Publication date: 24 September 2016
- Publication place: United Kingdom
- Media type: Print: hardback
- Pages: 224
- Awards: Jhalak Prize
- ISBN: 9781845233358
- OCLC: 969574038
- Dewey Decimal: 823.92
- LC Class: PR9275.G73 R678
- Preceded by: Pynter Bender
- Followed by: Black Rain Falling

The Bone Readers is a 2016 novel by Grenadan British author Jacob Ross, the second in his "Camaho Quartet." In 2017, it won the inaugural Jhalak Prize. In 2022, The Bone Readers was included on the "Big Jubilee Read" list of 70 books by Commonwealth authors, selected to celebrate the Platinum Jubilee of Elizabeth II.

== Plot ==
The novel is set on the island of Camaho, based on Ross's native Grenada (Kalinago: Camerhogne).

Michael "Digger" Digson testifies in a murder case and is recruited into a plainclothes homicide squad led by the mysterious Chilman, who is obsessed with the disappearance of a young man several years ago. Digger is also researching a cold case: his mother's, who was murdered by police when he was a child.

== Reception ==
The Bone Readers was praised in The Guardian by Bernardine Evaristo, who wrote: "Ross's characters are always powerfully delineated through brilliant visual descriptions, dialogue that trips off the tongue, and keenly observed behaviour. He excels at creating empathetic female characters. […] The Bone Readers is a page-turner, but its insights and language are equally testament to a literary novel of impressive depth and acuity."

It won the inaugural Jhalak Prize in 2017, with judge Musa Okwonga describing it as "by turns thrilling, visceral and meditative, and always cinematic", and Catherine Johnson saying that it "effortlessly draws together the past and the present, gender, politics and the legacy of colonialism in a top quality Caribbean set crime thriller". Co-founder of the prize and chair of judges Sunny Singh characterised the novel as "not only as an exemplar of the genre but for rising well above it".

In 2022, The Bone Readers was included on the Big Jubilee Read, a list of 70 books by Commonwealth authors produced to celebrate Queen Elizabeth II's Platinum Jubilee.
