= Alexandra Park, Manchester =

Park in Manchester, England

Alexandra Park
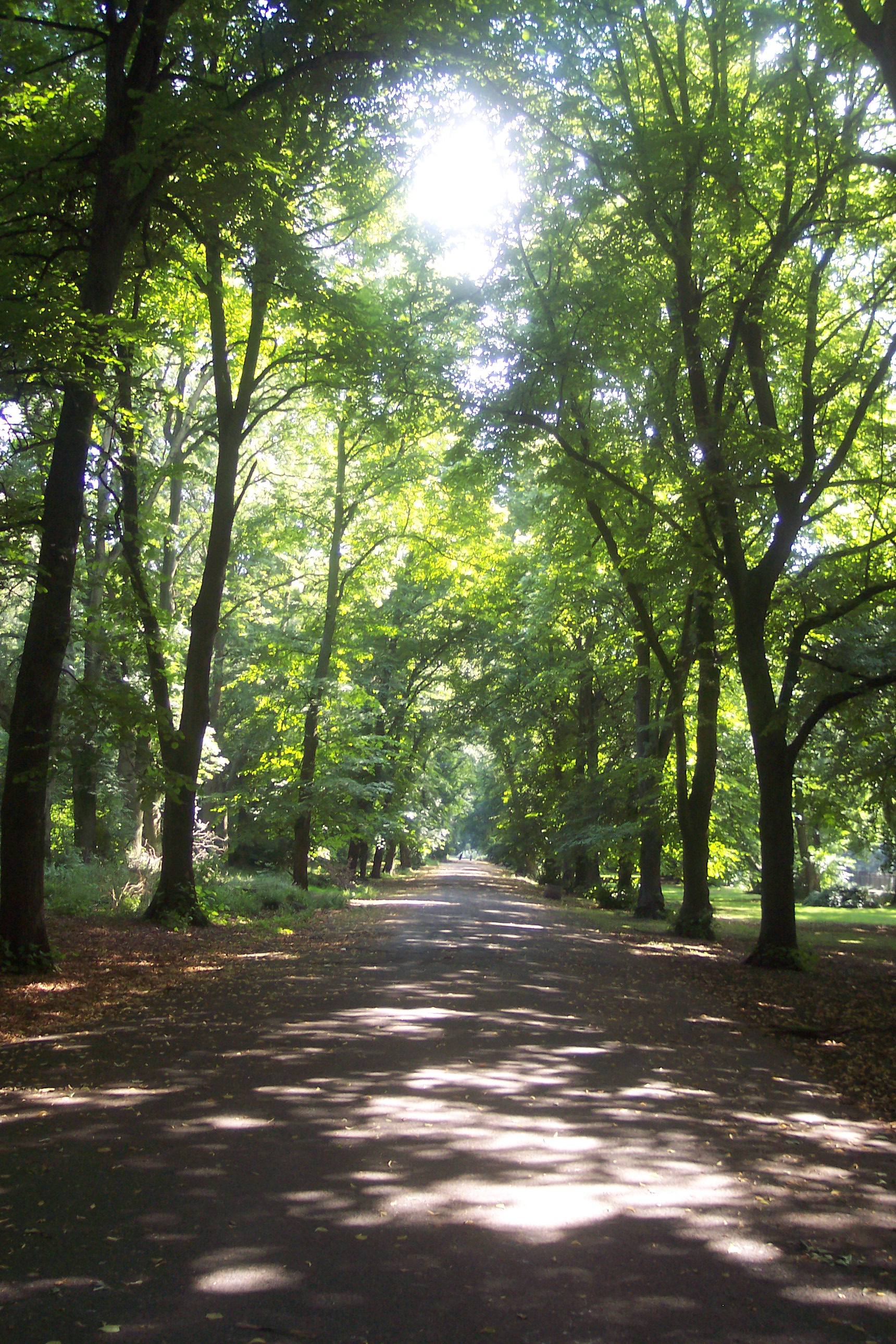
- Alexandra Park
- Interactive map of Alexandra Park
- Type: Municipal park
- Location: Whalley Range, England, U.K.
- Nearest city: Manchester
- Coordinates: 53°27′04″N 2°14′55″W
- Area: 60 acres (24 ha)
- Opened: 1870
- Designer: Alexander Gordon Hennell
- Administrator: Manchester City Council
- Open: Daily
- Status: Operational
- Website: www.alexandraparkmanchester.org

Listed Building – Grade II
- Designated: 1995

Alexandra Park is a 60-acre (24 ha) park in Whalley Range, Manchester, England, on the border of Moss Side, Manchester, on the border of Fallowfield, Manchester, designed by Alexander Gordon Hennell, and opened to the public in 1870. The lodge and gateways are the work of Alfred Darbyshire. The park was developed by Manchester Corporation before the area was incorporated into the city, the site being purchased in 1864 from William Egerton, 1st Baron Egerton. The roads to the east and west sides of the park were named Princess Road and Alexandra Road, also in honour of Princess Alexandra.

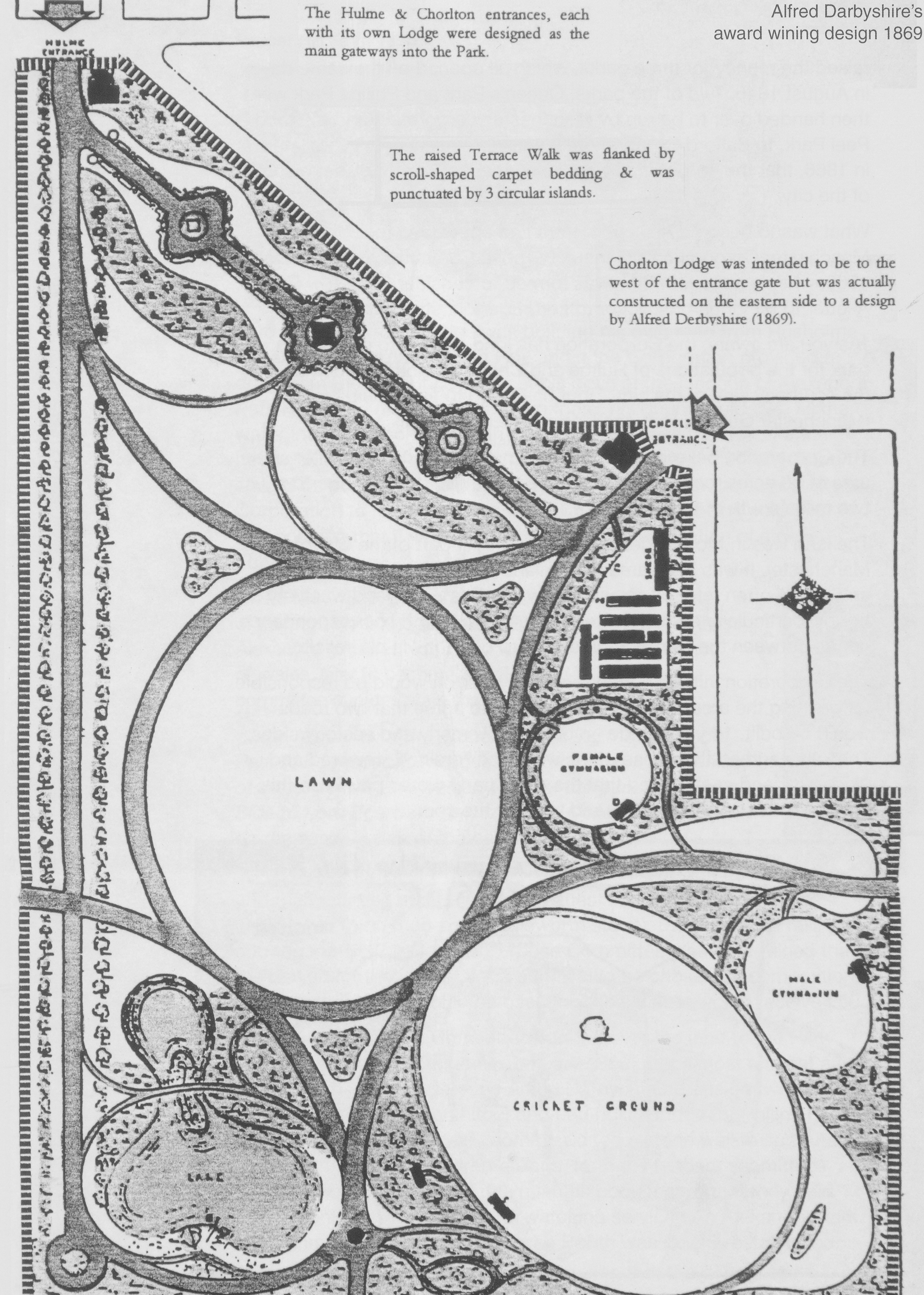
Plan of Alexandra Park, Manchester

== Design ==
Two lodges at the Northern entrances were designed by Alfred Darbyshire as homes for the park superintendent and the deputy park keeper. Only one, Chorlton Lodge, now survives. Hennell's design includes a raised walk, and a half mile lime walk wide enough for horse-drawn carriages, which are the only straight lines. All the other paths form circles and two large ovals, one of which encloses the cricket pitch, the other being used for football. A lake was constructed from two former marl pits. There is a sunken bowling green and there were originally extensive greenhouses. Alexandra Park supplied plants for the other parks in the city and plants and flowers for the town hall. A large collection of cacti was bequeathed to the city in 1904 by the widow of Charles Darrah. The curator of the collection Arthur Cubbold accompanied the bequest and a large cactus house, with five rooms of different temperatures, was built at a cost of £2,500. The cactus collection was moved to Wythenshawe Park around 1980.

== Flora and fauna ==
A number of Red Eared Terrapins, a species of small turtle, are known to inhabit the lake in the park. Their provenance has been attributed to the huge popularity of the Teenage Mutant Ninja Turtles franchise in the 1980s and 90s, during which thousands of UK families bought pets of turtles which may have been discarded once the fad ended. In 2013 a post on the Friends of Alexandra Park Facebook group called for the family of Floridian Red-Eared Turtles in the lake to be re-housed as they were eating the fish.

== Environs ==
The park gave its name to the nearby Alexandra Park station, until the station's name changed to Wilbraham Road, on amalgamation in 1923, in order to avoid ticketing confusion. There was also a nearby Alexandra Park Aerodrome during World War I and for a few years after the war. That site is now Hough End Playing Fields.

The park gives its name to a nearby council estate, developed in the 1960s. The previous Alexandra Park estate was the birthplace, in 1858, of Emmeline Pankhurst.

== Demonstrations ==
Keir Hardie organised the first known Independent Labour Party May Day rally in the park on 2 May 1892 which attracted about 60,000 people. The park was the venue for the great Manchester Women's Suffrage Demonstration of 24 October 1908 with a procession from Albert Square, and other suffrage demonstrations. On 11 November 1913, suffragette Kitty Marion planted a bomb that damaged the cactus house. A speaker's corner operated at the Northwest gate. Local Quakers collected signatures at the park gates in 1916 calling for peace. James Larkin spoke at a demonstration on 14 September 1913 at a rally in support of the Dublin lock-out. Oswald Mosley attempted to campaign in the park against immigration in 1960. Rock Against Racism organised several events in the park, one on 15 July 1978 featuring Steel Pulse and the Buzzcocks.

== Entertainment ==
The park is the site of the annual Manchester Caribbean Carnival. Part of Manchester's Black History Trail crosses the park. In the 1970s, Children's Christian Crusade gatherings were hosted in the park annually.

== Sport ==
Alexandra parkrun, a weekly timed 5k run, takes place on Saturday mornings. There is also a 2k junior parkrun for children aged 4 to 14, taking place on Sundays.

Facilities at Alexandra park include a football pitch, cricket field, tennis courts and multi-use games area (MUGA).

== Gallery ==
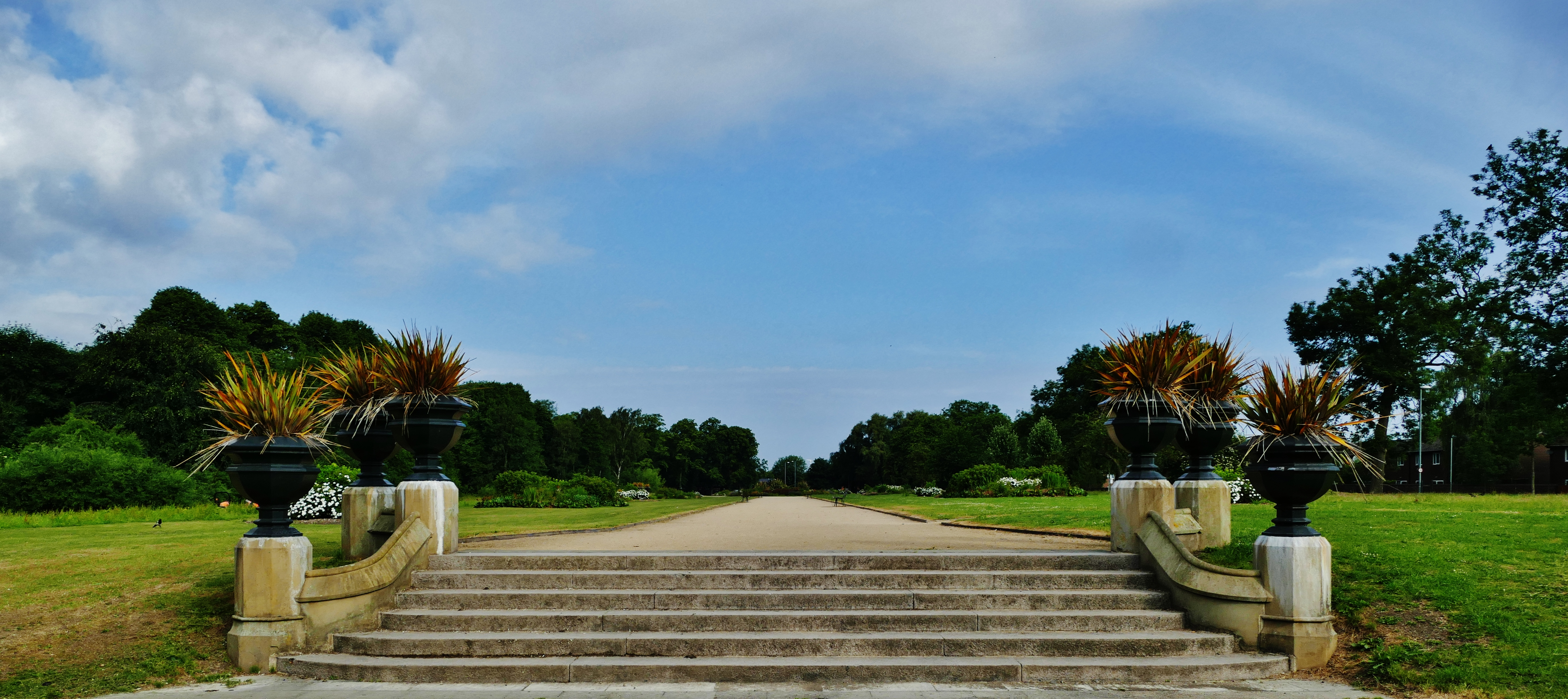
Promenade

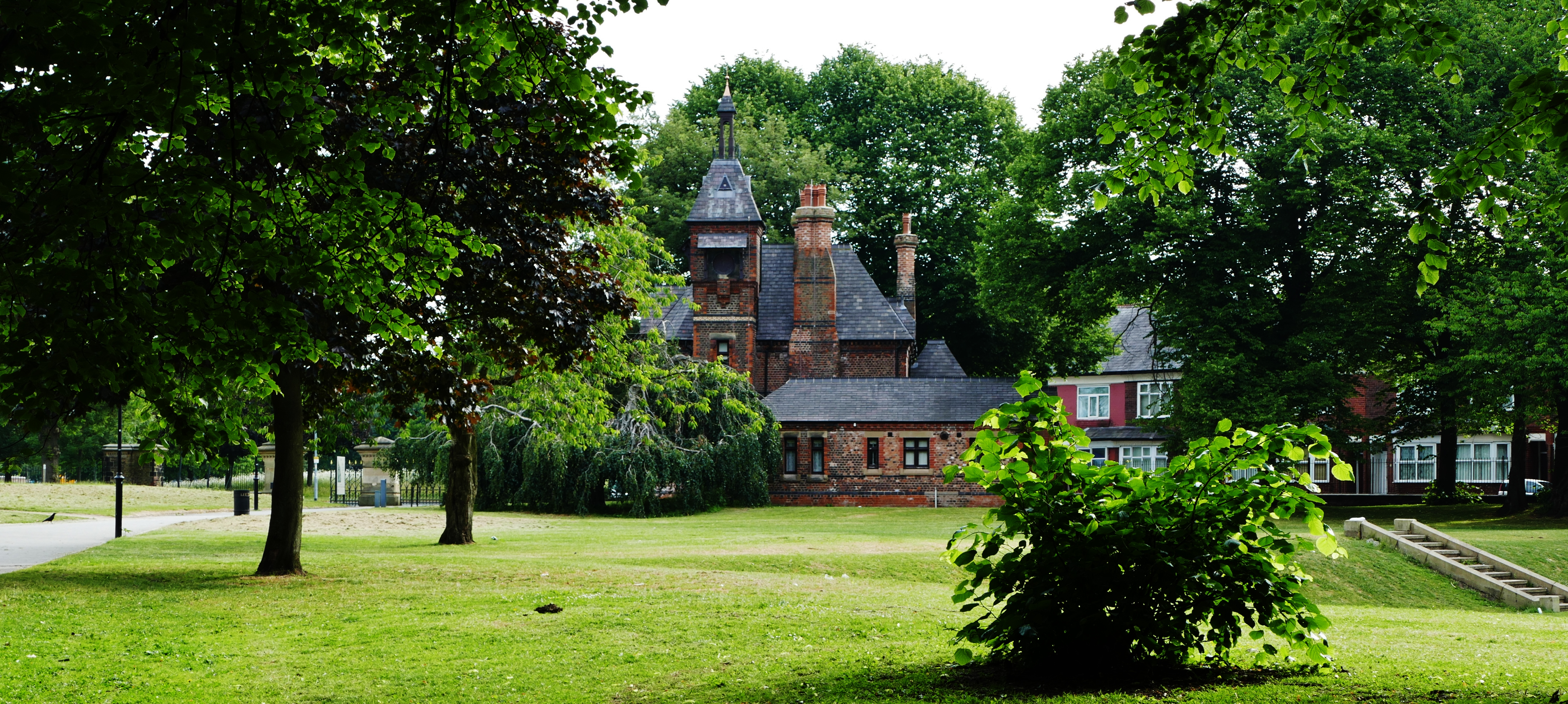
Chorlton Lodge, the former house of the park keeper

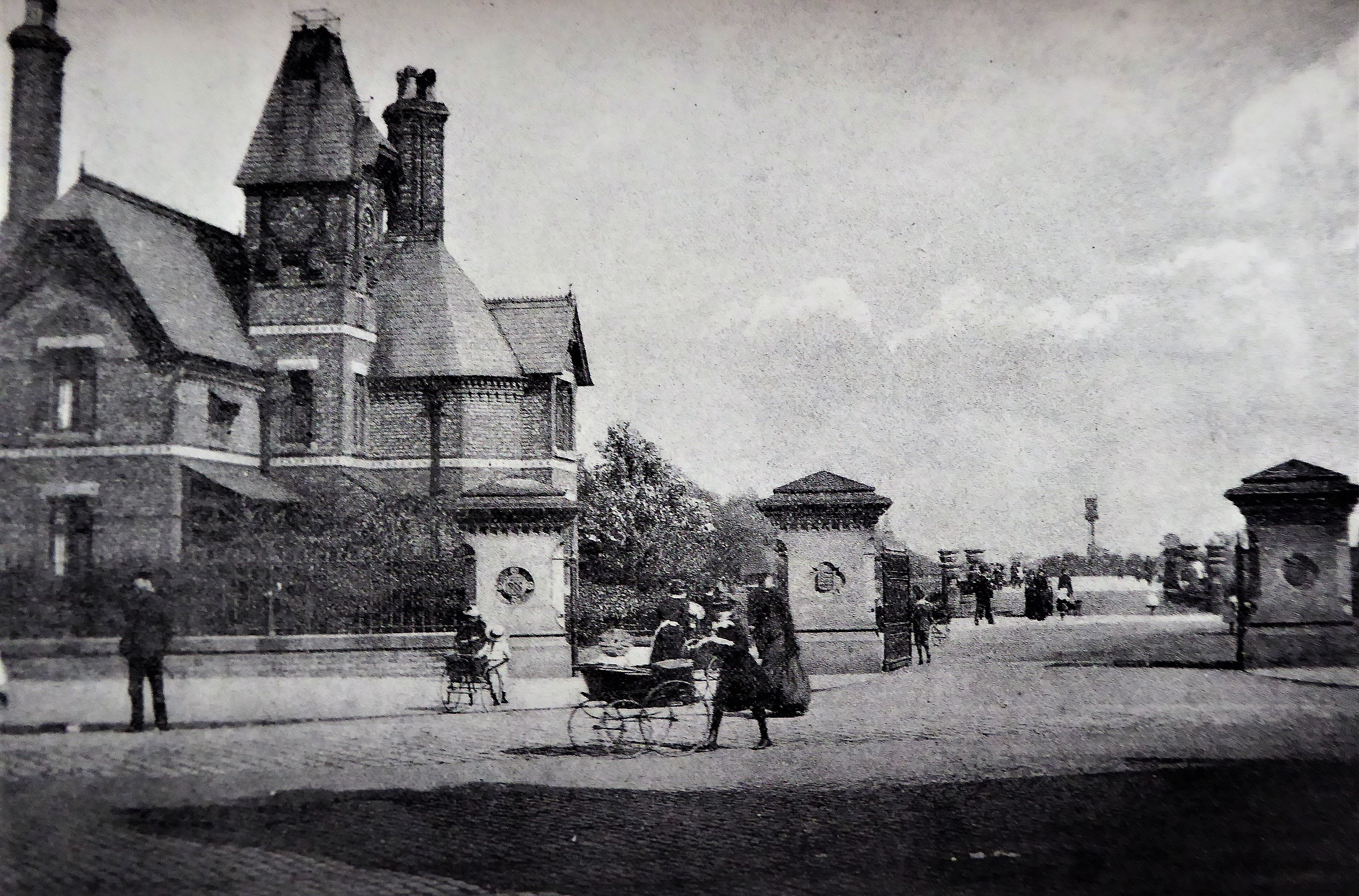
The lodge and park gates in 1891

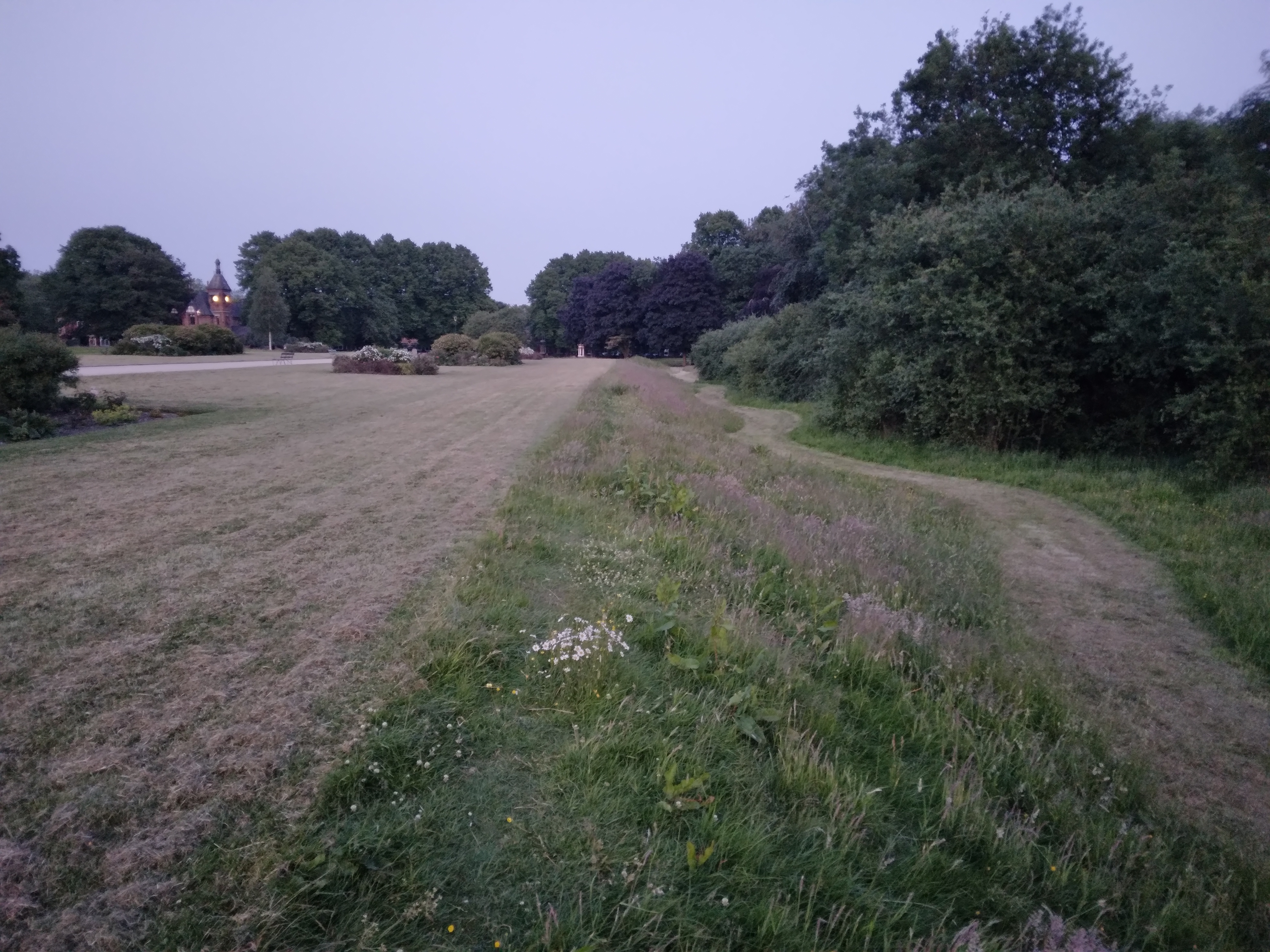
Sloped grassland in the park let to grow wild in order to increase biodiversity, June 2023

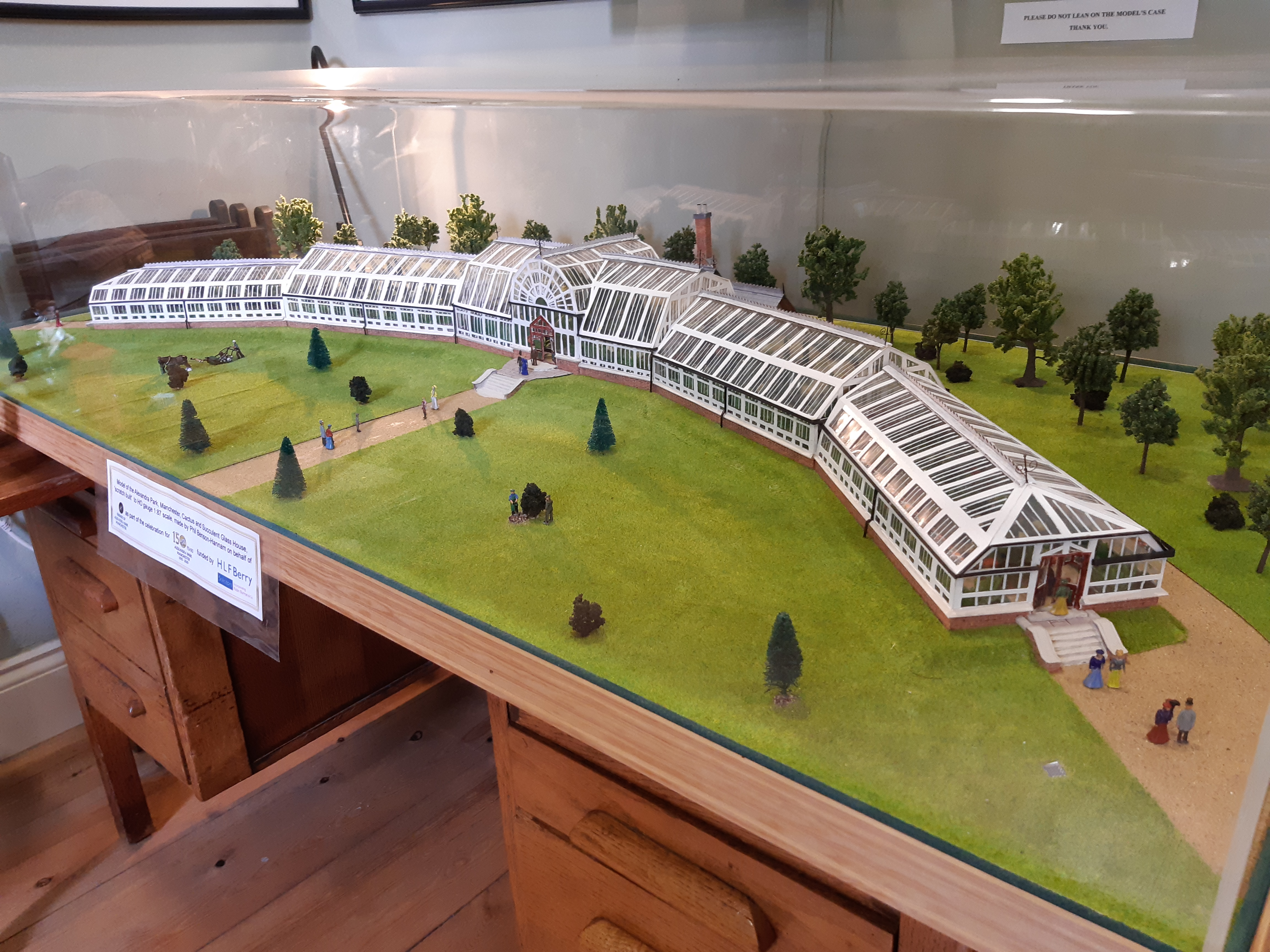
Model of the Cactus and Succulent Glass House that used to exist in the park, on display in Chorlton Lodge
