= Sunny Singh (writer) =

Indian-born academic and writer (born 1969)

Sunny Singh FRSL
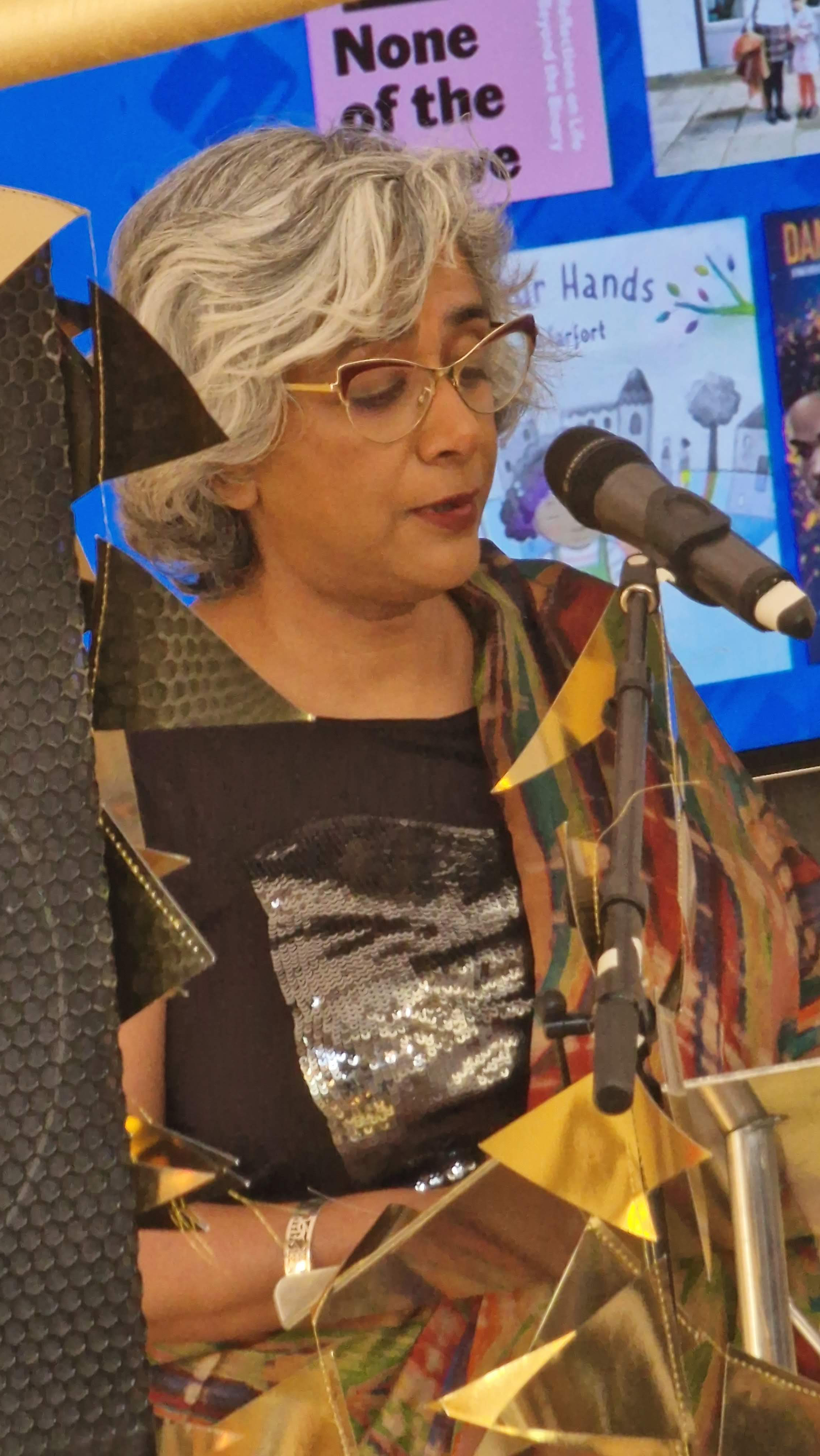
- Singh in 2023
- Born: 20 May 1969 (age 57); Varanasi, India
- Education: Brandeis University; Jawaharlal Nehru University; University of Barcelona
- Occupations: Academic and writer
- Known for: Co-founder of the Jhalak Prize

Sunny Singh FRSL (born 20 May 1969) is an Indian-born academic and writer of fiction and creative non-fiction. She is Professor of Creative Writing and Inclusion in the Arts at London Metropolitan University.

== Early life and education ==
Sunny Singh was born in Varanasi, India. Her father's work with the government meant that the family regularly moved, living in cantonments and outposts including Dehradun, Dibrugarh, Along and Teju. The family also followed her father's assignments abroad, living in Pakistan, the United States and Namibia.

Singh attended Brandeis University, where she majored in English and American Literature. She holds a master's degree in Spanish Language, Literature and Culture from Jawaharlal Nehru University and a PhD from the University of Barcelona, Spain.

== Career ==
Singh worked as a journalist and management executive in Mexico, Chile, and South Africa, before returning to India in 1995 to focus on writing. She worked as a freelance writer and journalist until 2002 in New Delhi, publishing her first two books in that period. She moved to Barcelona in 2002 to work on her PhD and published her second novel in 2006.

Before her appointment as Professor in 2020, Singh was Senior Lecturer and Course Leader in Creative Writing at the London Metropolitan University.

Singh was the Chairperson of the Authors' Club for some years. In 2016, Singh co-founded the Jhalak Prize for Book of the Year by a Writer of Colour. The award supports British writers with a one-thousand pound prize. It was initiated by Singh, Nikesh Shukla and Media Diversified, with support from The Authors' Club, an anonymous donor, and the Jhalak Foundation which is owned by Singh's family and named after her grandmother. In 2020, a sister award, the Jhalak Children’s & YA Prize, was founded.

Singh wrote in Twitter in 2020: "I get regular invites to debate on various platforms. I always say no. Because debate is an imperialist capitalist white supremacist cis heteropatriarchal technique that transforms a potential exchange of knowledge into a tool of exclusion & oppression.”

In 2021, Singh, along with Monisha Rajesh and Chimene Suleyman, received racist abuse on social media as a result of raising concerns about depictions of autism and of students of colour in Kate Clanchy's book Some Kids I Taught and What They Taught Me. Clanchy later claimed Singh encouraged social media followers to mock her grief following the death of her mother and in 2025 the controversy was the subject of a BBC radio series and podcast entitled "The Anatomy of a Cancellation".

In 2023, she was elected a Fellow of the Royal Society of Literature.

== Literary works ==
Singh has published three novels, three non-fiction books and numerous short stories and essays.

Singh's debut novel, Nani's Book of Suicides, won the Mar De Letras Prize in Spain in 2003. Her novel, Hotel Arcadia, was published by Quartet Books. Her latest book, A Bollywood State of Mind, was published on 19 October 2023 by Footnote Press (part of Bonnier Books

=== Books ===
- Nani's Book of Suicides, HarperCollins Publishers India (2000), ISBN 978-81-7223-397-6
- Single in the City, Penguin Books Australia (2000), ISBN 978-0-14-100024-4
- With Krishna's Eyes, Rupa & Co. (2006), ISBN 978-81-291-0966-8
- Hotel Arcadia, Quartet Books (2015), ISBN 978-0704373792
- Amitabh Bachchan, British Film Institute (2017), ISBN 978-1844576319
- A Bollywood State of Mind, Footnote Press (2023), ISBN 978-1-80444042-1

== Personal life ==
Singh lives in London.
