= Curdle Creek =

2024 horror novel by Yvonne Battle-Felton

- Author: Yvonne Battle-Felton
- Audio read by: Joniece Abbott-Pratt
- Language: English
- Genre: Horror
- Set in: 1960, Curdle Creek, a fictional American town
- Publisher: Henry Holt and Company (USA); Dialogue Books, an imprint of Hachette Book Group (UK)
- Publication date: 15 October 2024
- Publication place: United States; United Kingdom
- Pages: 304 (Hardcover)
- Awards: 2024 Shirley Jackson Award for Best Novel
- ISBN: 9781250362018

Curdle Creek: A Novel is a 2024 horror novel by Yvonne Battle-Felton. It is set in Curdle Creek, a fictional all-Black town in which citizens are ritually sacrificed to control the population. It is inspired by the 1948 short story "The Lottery". The novel won the 2024 Shirley Jackson Award for Best Novel.

== Plot ==
In 1960, a middle-aged widow named Osira lives in the all-Black town of Curdle Creek. The town is governed by a series of rituals. The most prominent ritual is the annual Moving On, in which citizens are sacrificed in order to control the population and ensure a bountiful harvest. Three years ago, Osira’s three children absconded from the town. As punishment, her husband Moses was chosen for the Moving On and was killed. Osira’s family is considered to have ill luck, since Osira’s older brother Romulus also left the town and his twin Remus was Moved On.

This year, Osira and five other women participate in the Running of the Widows. Four eligible men are seeking wives. Osira comes in fifth place in the race, leaving her single. The next morning, the Calling begins. Each citizen writes down their nomination for a person to be Moved On. Three names are drawn from the town well, including Osira’s father Osiris Turner. Osira has a vision that the Moving On must end, but it is not clear if her vision is real or if she is simply grief-stricken.

Osira’s mother Constance quarrels with Mother Opal, the Head Charter Mother of Curdle Creek. Mother Opal is responsible for verifying the names of the Moved On. Osira eavesdrops as Constance accuses Opal of falsehood. At the Turner home, Osira tells Constance about the vision. Constance replies that Mother Opal has died. The remaining Charter Mothers declare that the Moving On will continue despite Opal’s death; Constance becomes the new Head Charter Mother. Osira attempts to interfere with her father’s Moving On, but is unsuccessful. She is forced into the town well in an act of penance. Unknown to the others, Osira carries a Well Walker stone that was left by her father. Legend has it that Well Walkers can travel through time and space.

Osira emerges from the well, having traveled back in time. She meets younger versions of Constance and Opal, who initially think she is a witch. Osira has dinner with the past versions of her mother and grandparents, pretending to be a visitor from out of town. Osira’s grandparents quarrel about the situation. The grandparents, Constance, and other townspeople begin to chase Osira. She is struck on the head with a stone and blacks out.

Osira has a vision of a courtroom. She is placed on trial for her participation in the Moving On and all other horrors committed in the name of Curdle Creek. Osira calls Mother Opal as her character witness. Osira watches as a video plays during the evidentiary process. Opal was stoned to death by the other Mothers, including Constance. Osira is declared guilty by the court and sentenced to banishment. She speaks to the ghost of her father before being pushed into a well.

Osira is transported to the small town of Evanshire, England. There, she reunites with her older brother Romulus. Evanshire also has strange rituals. Romulus goes by the name Clement and is married to a woman named Margaret. Osira is assigned the name Estelle. The previous Estelle has died; Osira is expected to take on Estelle’s name, occupation, personality, and even her family members. Osira plans to leave town. The people of Evanshire plan to kill her, but she and Romulus escape. Pursued by a mob of villagers, they jump into a well.

== Reception and awards ==
James Gardner of Library Journal wrote that "Battle-Felton expands on the rules and consequences of Jackson’s story, showcasing the inherent rot of a system where violence is part and parcel of civic pride." Gardner praised the audiobook narrator, praising the inclusion of accents including Southern and Scottish variants. The review concluded by recommending the novel for fans of Southern gothic literature. Kirkus Reviews gave the novel a starred, commenting that the novel owes a debt to The Lottery. The review also noted that the novel draws from other African-American fiction, including works by Toni Morrison, Octavia Butler, and Colson Whitehead. Kirkus stated that the central theme is " how the need for communities to protect themselves unleashes its own anxieties and traumas."

Author and critic Gabino Iglesias reviewed the novel in the New York Times. He wrote that the novel explores themes of trading freedom for safety, as well as the ways in which small towns can harbor dark secrets and violence. Iglesias concluded that "this is a wonderful novel about the worst monsters of all: people." Lisa Tuttle of The Guardian wrote that "this gothic tale weighs the lasting impact of slavery in America". Tuttle stated that the novel has echoes of Jackson's original story, but that readers would be surprised by the "weirder twists and turns" that the novel took.

The novel won the 2024 Shirley Jackson Award for Best Novel.
