= Natives: Race and Class in the Ruins of Empire =

2019 non-fiction book

Natives
- Front cover
- Author: Akala
- Subject: Memoir; history; sociology
- Publisher: Two Roads
- Publication date: 21 March 2019
- Pages: 352
- ISBN: 9781473661233

Natives: Race and Class in the Ruins of Empire is a 2019 British book by the rapper Akala. Part memoir, the book provides race and class analysis of a variety of historical eras, in addition to contemporary British society. It received positive critical reception, in addition to nominations for the Jhalak Prize and James Tait Black Memorial Prize, and saw renewed attention following the May 2020 murder of George Floyd in America.

== Background ==
In October 2017, it was announced that John Murray imprint Two Roads had signed the rights to an upcoming memoir by Akala titled Natives: Race and Class in the Ruins of Empire. Akala said that writing offered a "certain clarity and conviction" and said that the book would include "personal stories and experiences as well as a wealth of historical data to explore how race and the much older inequalities of class shaped my childhood life and subsequent worldview". The book was released on 21 March 2019.

In 2018, Akala described the book's premise as "This sense that we [in Britain] are special and better than everyone else is rooted in the legacy of empire", saying "I wanted to see how that shaped me". Akala was interested in writing a book "to show how politics has manifested in [his] life". He was keen for young black children to read the book and gain appreciation for the value of education from it. He wanted to allow them to "understand the hurdles so they can jump over them" and expose the "silly myth" of Britain being a meritocracy. He described the process of historical and statistical research for the book to be "difficult and emotionally challenging".

== Synopsis ==
Akala, real name Kingslee Daley, writes about his childhood in Camden, London. Born to a Jamaican father, he grew up living with his Scottish mother. His grandparents were members of the Windrush generation. He struggled in school, feeling like he did not fit in. His stepdad was a stage manager, so he regularly attended the theatre as a young child. Akala gained awareness of racial issues from attending a Pan-African Saturday school. At age seven he was placed in special needs classes for children who did not speak English, despite showing academic ability and reading The Lord of the Rings at the time. He said that his teacher found him "too bright for a working class brown boy". He was talented at mathematics and attained high grades in his end-of-school exams. He was a keen footballer and a member of the West Ham youth club. As a young man, he was involved in street gangs and carried a knife for self-defence. He saw stabbings and acts of extreme violence, including watching his friend being attacked with a meat cleaver. He was regularly stopped and searched by police from the age of 12.

The book also focuses on historical racism such as Japanese imperialism, the colonial British Hong Kong, the Arab slave trade and Atlantic slave trade and conceptions of blackness in 1400s Spain. He comments on the changing concept of whiteness and its scientific, legal and social role, particularly in relation to imperialism. In contemporary Britain, he describes attitudes towards black sportspeople. Akala argues that Britain is not a meritocracy and comments on the intersection of race and class, contesting prejudices against the white working class. He attributes poor educational records of black children in schools to a culture of racism.

Also discussed are sexual objectification and the far-right, including the white genocide conspiracy theory. Akala argues that freedom of speech does not entitle anybody to a public platform. The book ends with a pessimistic view of the future.

== Reception ==
Following its release, the book was listed as a bestseller by The Sunday Times. In 2019, the book was nominated for the Jhalak Prize and James Tait Black Memorial Prize. It was longlisted for the Orwell Prize for Political Writing.

The book received renewed interest after the May 2020 murder of George Floyd, reaching seventh on the list of most popular Amazon UK books and placing in the top five most-sold books by Waterstones in early June. The book sold out as a result.

=== Critical reception ===
Reception at the time of the book's release was positive. John Kerrigan of The Times Literary Supplement chose the book as his 2018 Book of the Year, describing its prose as "lucid" and scope as "wide-ranging". In a positive review for The Observer, Afua Hirsch praised the "many personal passages" of the book and the author's "disruptive, aggressive intellect". Praising Akala's "almost clinical level of self-awareness", The Guardian's David Olusoga compared the book favourably to The Autobiography of Malcolm X. Andrew Hadfield of The Irish Times found the book to be "bristling with intelligence and insight", calling Akala a "careful and subtle thinker on class". He commented that Akala "could have been even harder on the complacent blindness of those who refuse to acknowledge that not everything has been in their gift".

David Wearing of New Humanist lauded Akala's writing style, calling it in parts "conversational" and "highly engaging", and in other parts "analytic" and "alive to nuance". He praised the book's "intimate and striking personal stories" as well as its "scrupulously fair and always humane" tone, arguing that Akala demonstrates "constant awareness of the reader's potential counter-arguments".

The book received further critical attention in June 2020. Natasha Mwansa of the Evening Standard described the book as "ideal for anyone who is unaware of how institutions like the police and education consistently fail young black people, particularly from working class backgrounds".
