= Andrea Enisuoh =

British activist and journalist (1970–2020)

- Born: 1970 Manchester, England
- Died: 13 February 2020 (aged 49–50)
- Occupation: Journalist, community activist, trade unionist, parent
- Period: 1989–2020
- Subject: Equity, diversity, inclusion and accessibility

Andrea Enisuoh (1970 – 13 February 2020) was an English socialist, feminist, journalist, political activist, trade unionist, human rights campaigner, and volunteer based in Hackney, London, England. In 1989, she was the first Black woman to be elected a member of the National Executive Committee of the National Union of Students (NUS).

== Biography ==
Enisuoh was born in Manchester, England, and it was while attending Further Education college in Manchester that she became involved in politics, serving as Chair of the Youth Action Committee in the city in 1987. She spent most of her living and working life based in Hackney.

Enisuoh was active in her efforts supporting equity in many aspects of her life, including politics and sports. In 1989, Enisuoh was elected a member of the NUS National Executive Committee, making her the first Black woman to hold the position. In 1989, as a supporter of Militant (a left faction of the Labour Party), Enisuoh authored the publication By Any Means Necessary: The Life and Legacy of Malcolm X. She was the first London worker in the Show Racism the Red Card campaign, founded to call out discrimination in football. Enisuoh was also an active trade unionist of the independent democratic trade union, the Transport Salaried Staffs' Association (TSSA).

For a decade, Enisuoh worked at Hackney Council for Voluntary Services (CVS) in support of designing, creating and implementing programs in response to community need. Enisuoh's programming supported progressive community development bolstering local diversity, equity and inclusion skillsets, with a focus on mentoring individuals who identified as having learning differences. In 2010 Enisuoh was a member of the Black and Ethnic Minority Arts Network (BEMA). Her co-ordination at BEMA provided community support for members via mentorship and learning opportunities to upgrade their skillsets in navigating the injustices and discrimination faced by visible minorities.

In 2010, Enisuoh further campaigned as a BEMA coordinator in Hackney to retain the name of the C. L. R. James Library, named after the Trinidadian author.

Enisuoh was an arts and culture contributor to New Nation weekly newspaper, and supported increased representation of Black writers in theatre and performance. In 2003, she appeared as a talking head on BBC Radio 4's Front Row, to discuss Percival Everett's novel Erasure. She collaborated with Grenada-born writer Jacob Ross to edit the short story collection Turf.

Enisuoh died on 13 February 2020, aged 49. She is survived by her son Kofi, who is the youngest member of Hackney Youth Parliament.

== Awards and legacy ==
Enisuoh was awarded a George Viner Memorial Fund scholarship in journalism in 1993.
