= Nii Kwate Owoo =

Ghanaian academic and filmmaker (born 1944)

- Born: 1944 (age 81–82)
- Other name: Kwate Nee-Owoo
- Education: Mfantsipim School; London Film School; Isleworth Polytechnic
- Occupations: Academic and filmmaker
- Notable work: You Hide Me (1970)

Nii Kwate Owoo (born 1944) is a Ghanaian academic and filmmaker, described by Variety as "one of the first Ghanaians to lense in 35mm". His name has also appeared in film credits as Kwate Nee-Owoo.

== Background ==
Owoo was educated at Mfantsipim School, Cape Coast, Ghana, and subsequently went to the UK and studied direction, camera and editing at the London Film School (1968–71) and at Isleworth Polytechnic, London.

His documentary film You Hide Me is considered the first from English-speaking independent Africa. Controversial in subject matter, it was shot in 1970 in England (where he was part of the Cinema Action film collective) and "is an exposé of the theft and concealment of ancient and rare African Art hidden in plastic bags and wooden boxes in the basement of the British Museum", with Owoo making a case for the artworks being returned to their place of origin. The film was "one of the first artistic interventions concerning the restitution of cultural property." Owoo has been quoted as saying: "My film was banned in Ghana in 1971 and was rejected by Ghana Television at the time for being Anti-British: it was the result of this banning which was reported and given prominent publicity by West Africa Magazine in 1971 that gave the film its world wide acclaim and controversy (…). This film when it was released on celluloid was widely distributed around the world."

Owoo has been producer and director on a number of other notable film projects, such as the 1991 feature Ama: An African Voyage of Discovery, which he co-directed with Kwesi Owusu for Channel 4 television, with a cast including Thomas Baptiste, Anima Misa, Roger Griffiths, Joy Elias-Rilwan, Georgina Ackerman, Eddie Tagoe, Pitika Ntuli, Adzido Pan African Dance Ensemble and the Pan-African Orchestra. Reviewed as "the first African film set and shot in the UK", Ama broke box-office records in Accra, was screened in London's West End, and has been shown at Cannes, as well as at other international film festivals such as the African Film Festival in New York City.

From 1993 to 1995, Owoo was Managing Editor at Ecrans d'Afrique, published by the Pan-African Federation of Filmmakers, and he was the founder and head of the Media Research Unit at the Institute of African Studies (University of Ghana) from 1978 to 2002.

== Film and television ==
- Women of Substance (documentary, African Women's Development Fund, 2002)
- Music and Vision: Kwabena Nketia (documentary, International African Music and Research Center, 1998)
- Treat with Contempt (documentary, Noguchi Memorial Institute for Medical Research, 1998)
- Ama: An African Voyage of Discovery (feature film, co-directed with Kwesi Owusu, Channel 4/Artificial Eye, 1991, 100 mins)
- Ouaga: African Cinema Now! (documentary, co-directed with Kwesi Owusu, Channel 4, 1987)
- Gold - the Traditional Lost Wax Process (1980)
- Okyeame Akuffo: State Linguist (documentary, 1978)
- The Struggle for a Free Zimbabwe (documentary, Europe Africa Research Project, 1974)
- You Hide Me (documentary, Ifriqyah Films, 1970)
