= Sabba Khan =

English architect and artist

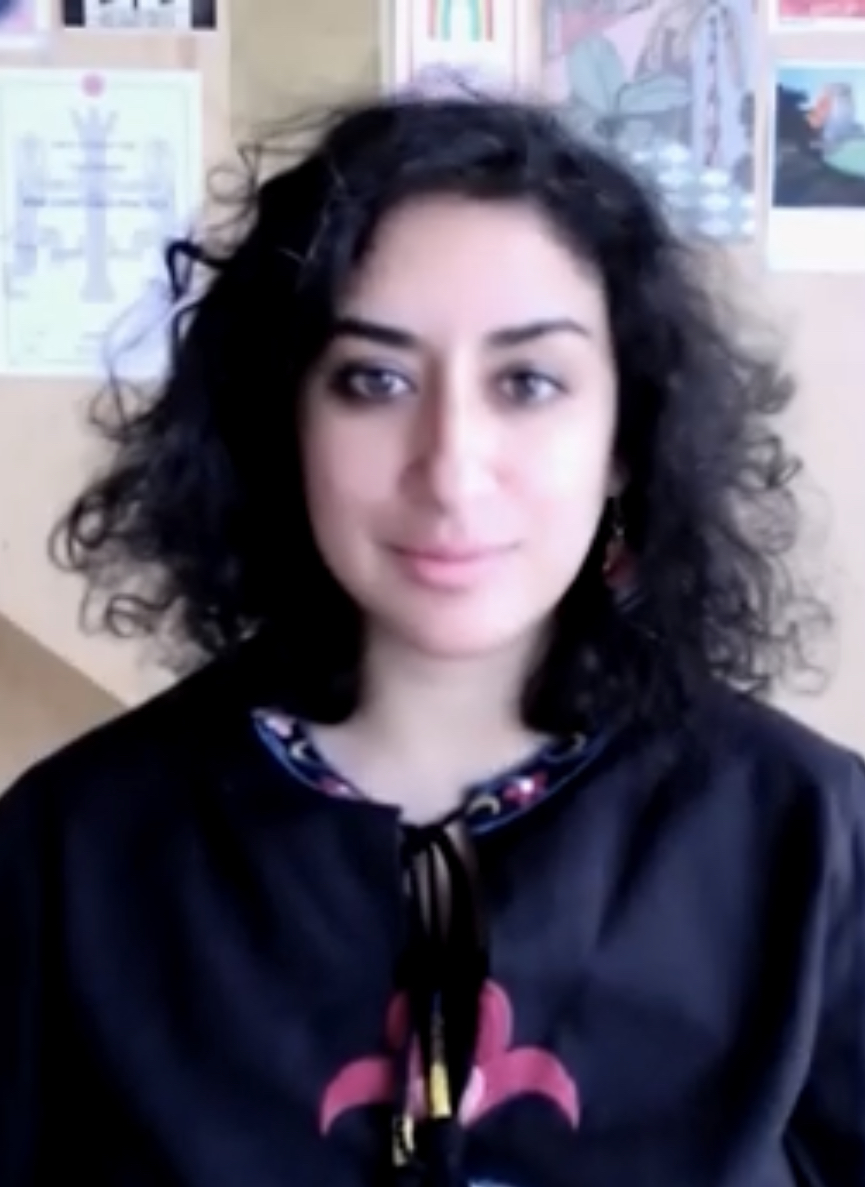
- Khan in 2022
- Born: July 1985 (age 41)
- Education: Central Saint Martins; University of Westminster
- Spouse: Mark Bonshek
- Website: sabbakhan.com

Sabba Khan (born July 1985) is an English architect, artist and graphic novelist. Her graphic memoir The Roles We Play (2021) won the Jhalak Prize among other accolades.

== Early life ==
Khan was born to working class Azad Kashmiri parents who arrived in England from Mirpur in the 1960s and grew up on Green Street in Newham, East London. Khan graduated with a Bachelor of Arts (BA) in Architecture from Central Saint Martins and the University of Westminster.

== Career ==
In 2020, Khan founded an architectural practice with her husband Mark Bonshek called Khan Bonshek. Khan also works as a visual artist.

=== The Roles We Play ===
Via Myriad Editions, Khan's debut autobiographical book The Roles We Play was published in 2021. It also had a U.S. release under the title What is Home, Mum?. The graphic memoir traces Khan's family history from the Partition of India to her own East London coming-of-age. The Roles We Play won the 2022 Jhalak Prize, making Khan the first graphic novelist to win this prize, and the Broken Frontier Award for Breakout Talent. It was also longlisted for the Royal Society of Literature's Ondaatje Prize and shortlisted for a British Book Design & Production Award in the Graphic Novel category. What is Home, Mum? was shortlisted for Outstanding Graphic Novel at the Ignatz Awards and tied for third on the Publishers Weekly Graphic Novel Critics Poll.

== Personal life ==
Khan lives in the Maryland area of East London with her husband Mark Bonshek.

== Bibliography ==
- The Roles We Play (2022) (also released as What is Home, Mum?)

== Accolades ==
Year	Award	Category	Title	Result	Ref
2022	Broken Frontier Awards	Breakout Talent	The Roles We Play	Won	
2022	Broken Frontier Awards	Best Graphic Non-fiction	The Roles We Play	Shortlisted	
2022	Ondaatje Prize		The Roles We Play	Longlisted	
2022	Jhalak Prize		The Roles We Play	Won	
2022	British Book Design & Production Awards	Graphic Novel	The Roles We Play	Shortlisted	
2022	Ignatz Awards	Outstanding Graphic Novel	What is Home, Mum?	Shortlisted	
2022	Publishers Weekly	Graphic Novel Critics Poll	What is Home, Mum?	3rd	
