= Hiba Noor Khan =

English children's author and teacher

- Education: University of Manchester; Keble College, Oxford; SOAS University of London

Hiba Noor Khan is an English children's author and physics teacher. Her middle grade historical fiction novel Safiyyah's War (2023) won a 2024 Jhalak Prize and was shortlisted for the 2024 Kirkus Prize.

== Early life and education ==
Of Pakistani descent, Khan grew up in Essex and attended Chelmsford County High School for Girls (CCHS). She graduated with a Bachelor of Science in Engineering from the University of Manchester in 2014. She completed a Postgraduate Certificate in Education (PCGE) at Keble College, Oxford in 2015. She later pursued a Master of Arts (MA) in Global Diplomacy at SOAS University of London.

== Career ==
Khan worked as a physics teacher in Lancashire and as an aid worker in Tanzania and Turkey. She assisted in policy research for the 2015 Commission on Religion and Belief in British Public Life.

In 2019, Khan was commissioned to write an installment of Penguin Random House's Extraordinary Lives series about Malala Yousafzai. Via Macmillan, Khan published her first picture book The Little War Cat in 2020, with illustrations provided by fellow CCHS alumnus Laura Chamberlain. Khan had been inspired by the true story of Mohammad Alaa Aljaleel, an Aleppo ambulance driver who rescued over 30 cats during the Syrian Civil War.

Khan then wrote the non-fiction picture book Inspiring Inventors Who Are Changing Our Future (2022) for Walker Books' People Power series, illustrated by Salini Perera. Macmillan also picked up Khan's physics book How to Spaghettify Your Dog (2023), illustrated by Harry Woodgate and another non-fiction work One Home: Eighteen Stories of Hope from Young Activists, illustrated by Rachael Dean.

At the start of 2023, Andersen Press acquired the rights to publish Khan's debut middle grade novel Safiyyah's War later that year. Told from the perspective of an 11-year-old Muslim girl, the novel is based on the true story of how the Grand Mosque of Paris during World War II protected Jews by forging identity documents and allowing them to seek shelter in the catacombs. Safiyyah's War won the 2024 Jhalak Prize and an Indie Book Award for Children's Fiction. It was also shortlisted for the Carnegie Medal, Branford Boase Award, and Kirkus Prize.

Khan's second novel, The Line They Drew Through Us, was published in 2025.

== Bibliography ==
=== Fiction ===
- The Little War Cat (2020)
- Safiyyah's War (2023)
- The Line They Drew Through Us (2025)

=== Non-fiction ===
- The Extraordinary Life of Malala Yousafzai (2019) (part of Extraordinary Lives series)
- Inspiring Inventors Who Are Changing Our Future (2022) (part of People Power series)
- How to Spaghettify Your Dog (2023)
- One Home: Eighteen Stories of Hope from Young Activists (2024)

== Accolades ==
Year	Award	Category	Title	Result	Ref
2024	Jhalak Prize	Children's and Young Adult	Safiyyah's War	Won	
2024	Carnegie Medal		Safiyyah's War	Shortlisted	
2024	Indie Book Awards (UK)	Children's Fiction	Safiyyah's War	Won	
2024	Branford Boase Award		Safiyyah's War	Shortlisted	
2024	The Week Junior Book Awards	Children's Book of the Year – Older Fiction	Safiyyah's War	Won	
2024	The Week Junior Book Awards	Children's Book of the Year – STEM	How to Spaghettify Your Dog	Shortlisted	(Note: Shared with Harry Woodgate)
2024	Kirkus Prize	Young Readers’ Literature	Safiyyah's War	Shortlisted	
