= Kwesi Owusu =

Ghanaian author and filmmaker (1954–2025)

- Born: Kwesi Kwarteng Owusu; 24 October 1954; Sekondi, Ghana
- Died: 22 March 2025 (aged 70); London, England
- Education: Adisadel College; London School of Economics
- Occupations: Writer, filmmaker, podcast host
- Years active: 1980–2025
- Known for: Co-founder of African Dawn; co-founder of Creative Storm Ghana
- Notable work: Ama (1991); Black British Culture and Society (2000): Maternal Health Channel Television Series (2013)
- Website: kwesinews.com

Kwesi Owusu (24 October 1954 – 22 March 2025) was a Ghanaian writer, filmmaker and creative entrepreneur. He was considered "one of Ghana’s leading filmmakers and communications specialists" and was also the author of five books. In the 1980s, he was a founding member of the influential pan-African performance group African Dawn. From 2022, Owusu hosted the African Dawn podcast, covering "untold stories" from Africa's cultural history as well as current trends in the arts world.

== Biography ==
=== Early years and education ===
Kwesi Kwarteng Owusu was born in Sekondi, Gold Coast (present-day Ghana), in 1954. He attended Adisadel College, Cape Coast, going on to do postgraduate studies in Political Science and Pre Colonial African Social Formations at the London School of Economics (1980–83).

=== African Dawn ===
Continuing to be based in England, in the 1980s, Owusu co-founded the pan-African poetry and music group, African Dawn, together with Sheikh Gueye and Wanjiku Kiarie, later joined by Nii Noi Nortey, Merle Collins, Wala Danga, and Vico Mensah. Described as "modern-day griots", African Dawn released four albums, and among other activities worked with Ngũgĩ wa Thiong'o on the 1984 stage production The Trial of Dedan Kimathi. Commenting on the aesthetics used by African Dawn, Ngũgĩ stated: "For Owusu, the fusion of art forms characteristic of orature is what gives to black artists an international character as artists and cultural workers defying formal definitions of the geopolitical to connect with centres of inspiration in Africa, Asia, and the Caribbean without relinquishing their claims to their legitimate space within Britain and Europe. Orature so conceived is against the ghetto and the margin."

=== Writing ===
In 1986, Owusu published the book The Struggle for Black Arts in Britain (about establishing an authentic Black arts tradition in the UK, and the links between popular art, activism and Black rebellion), followed in 1987 by Behind the Masquerade, written with Jacob Ross, on the Notting Hill Carnival.

Owusu edited Storms of the Heart: An Anthology of Black Arts and Culture (1988) and Black British Culture and Society: A Text Reader in 2000. Scholar and critical theorist Homi K. Bhabha in a review of Storms of the Heart for Art Monthly stated: "There is a storm at the heart of this book, a turbulence that accompanies the emergence of contemporary Black culture, that is reflected in the form of the text itself. ...and perhaps the most exciting reorganisation of cultural space that is presaged in this book, for me at least, is its effective refusal of a unitary concept of culture."

In 2012, Owusu published Ghana Highlife Music, co-authored with African music specialist Florent Mazzoleni.

=== Film ===
Owusu's film career began in the 1980s, when he was an apprentice producer and director with Channel 4's Cinema Action. In 1988, he and Kwate Nee-Owoo made Ouaga, a documentary on African cinema, and their feature film Ama – the first African film to be shot in London – was released to much acclaim in 1992, screened in Ghana, London, Cannes and elsewhere internationally.

Among the numerous films Owusu has directed are Love in a Cold Climate (1990), Segrin Africa (1993) and, from 2003, with the multi-media production house Creative Storm and Mildred Samuel, Water is Life (2003), The Lights Have Gone Out Again (2009), Ghana's Plastic Waste Menace (2009), Singing For Freedom (2010), Environmental Health Channel (2013) and the Maternal Health Channel Television Series (2013), including screenings at the first Environmental Film Festival of Accra. Film producer and journalist Afua Hirsch in a review for The Guardian stated: "The documentaries tell powerful real-life stories. Creative Storm documentaries have a reputation for sparking change in Ghana. Its 2003, environmental documentary Water Is Life influenced a change in water policy, from privatisation to a public-private partnership, and a year-long series the team produced, the Environment Channel, in 2010, was praised for stimulating debate about environmental challenges."

=== Other media, cultural work and activism ===
Owusu was part of a consortium, called Black Triangle, that bought the Electric Cinema, Notting Hill, in London's Portobello Road, and he had responsibility for running the cinema, with partners in the consortium representing other branches of the black media: Val McCalla from Voice Communications Group and Neil Kenlock from Choice FM radio.

Owusu was on the editorial board of Artrage magazine, was a research associate of the University of Cambridge's African Studies Centre, and taught at universities in the UK and the US.

Owusu was head of the Africa Initiative of the effective Jubilee 2000 campaign for debt cancellation for the poorest countries.

In 2003, he opened the media production house Creative Storm, dedicating the launch to the work of musician Mac Tontoh of Osibisa, and subsequently launching other works of Ghanaian music and film.

Owusu co-produced the High Vibes Music Festival, launched in 2009, that was described as "Accra’s most exciting music festival" and featured leading musicians from the region such as Tony Allen, Manou Gallo, Reggie Rockstone, Yaa Pono, Wulomei, Kwame Yeboah, and Gyedu-Blay Ambolley.

In 2018, Owusu was appointed Director of the School of Creative Arts (SoCA) at the African University College of Communications in Accra, Ghana.

In 2022, Owusu launched the African Dawn podcast, "dedicated to telling untold stories from Africa".

== Death ==
Owusu died in London, England on 22 March 2025, at the age of 70.

== Awards and recognition ==
- 2006: nominated Personality of the Century by the Millennium Excellence Awards
- 2008: ACRAG (Arts Critics and Reviewers Association of Ghana) award for cultural ambassador

== Bibliography ==
- The Struggle for Black Arts in Britain: What Can We Consider Better Than Freedom, London: Comedia Publishing Group, 1986.
- (With Jacob Ross) Behind the Masquerade: The Story of Notting Hill Carnival, Arts Media Group, 1987.
- (Editor) Storms of the Heart: An Anthology of Black Arts and Culture, London: Camden Press, 1988.
- (Editor) Black British Culture and Society: A Text Reader, London: Routledge, 2000, ISBN 9780203360644.
- (With Florent Mazzoleni) Ghana Highlife Music, Le Castor Astral, 2012.

== Selected filmography ==
- Ouaga: African Cinema Now! (documentary, co-directed with Kwate Nee-Owoo; Channel 4, 1988)
- Love in a Cold Climate: A Story of Urban Living and Rituals of Survival (1990)
- Ama (feature film, co-directed with Kwate Nee-Owoo, Channel 4/Artificial Eye, 1991, 100 mins)
- Segrin Africa (1993)
- Water is Life (Creative Storm/Oxfam, 2003).
- The Lights Have Gone Out Again (2009)
- Ghana's Plastic Waste Menace (2009)
- Singing For Freedom (2010)
- Environmental Health Channel (2013)
- Maternal Health Channel Television Series (2013)
