= Maisie Chan =

British writer (born 1977)

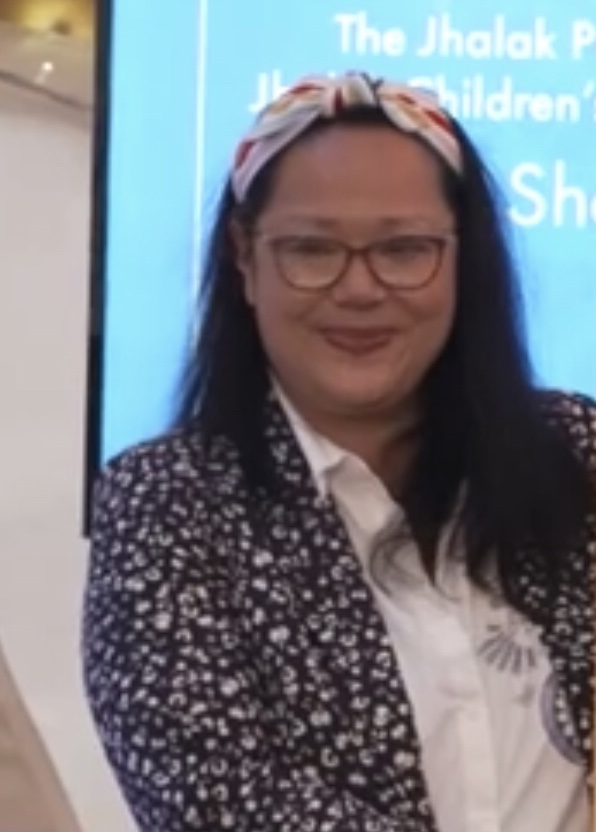
- Akbar in 2022
- Born: 1977 (age 48–49); Birmingham, England
- Education: University of Birmingham
- Years active: 2021–present
- Website: www.maisiechan.com

Maisie Chan (born 1977) is a British children's writer from Birmingham and based in Glasgow. Her novel Danny Chung Does Not Do Maths (2021) won the Branford Boase Award and a Jhalak Prize.

== Early life ==
Chan was born in Birmingham to Hong Kong-Chinese parents who worked in a takeaway. Chan was placed in private foster care and subsequently adopted by an older couple, her adoptive father a machine cleaner and mother, a dinner lady. Chan grew up on Dale Road in south Birmingham.

Chan graduated with a Bachelor of Arts (BA) in 1999 and then a Master of Philosophy (MPhil), both from the University of Birmingham. She also pursued a diploma in Creative Writing at Birmingham City University. Having studied Asian American literature and studied abroad for a year, Chan was inspired to go into writing to help improve British Chinese representation in media and literature.

== Career ==
Via Piccadilly Press (a Bonnier Books UK imprint), Change published her debut novel Danny Chung Does Not Do Maths in 2021. It was also released in the USA as Danny Chung Sums It Up. Anh Cao provided the illustrations and cover art for the former, while Natelle Quek provided them for the latter. Danny Chung Does Not Do Maths won the Branford Boase Award and the Jhalak Prize in the Children's and Young Adult category. It was also shortlisted for the Blue Peter Book Award for Best Story.

Chan signed a second book deal with Hachette Children's, through which she published her Tiger Warrior series, starting with a trilogy before expanding to further novels. She also contributed a short story to the anthology The Very Merry Murder Club, edited by Serena Patel.

This was followed by Chan's second standalone novel Keep Dancing, Lizzie Chu, published in 2022 via Piccadilly Press. Keep Dancing, Lizzie Chu was a Read for Empathy collection pick.

From 2024 to 2026, Chan is a Royal Literary Fund (RLF) Fellow at the University of Strathclyde. Chan reunited with Piccadilly Press in 2025 and published her third standalone novel Nate Yu's Blast from the Past.

== Personal life ==
Chan lives in Glasgow with her family.

== Bibliography ==
=== Tiger Warrior ===
- Attack of the Dragon King (2021)
- War of the Fox Demons (2021)
- Rise of the Lion Beast (2022)
- Battle for the Jade Rabbit (2023)
- Fight for the Cursed Unicorn (2024)
- Clash of the Dragon Masters (2024)

=== Standalones ===
- Danny Chung Does Not Do Maths (2021) (Danny Chung Sums it Up)
- Keep Dancing, Lizzie Chu (2022)
- Nate Yu's Blast from the Past (2025)

=== Short stories ===
- The Very Merry Murder Club (2021)

== Accolades ==
Year	Award	Category	Title	Result	Ref.
2022	Blue Peter Book Award	Best Story	Danny Chung Does Not Do Maths	Shortlisted	
2022	Jhalak Prize	Children's and Young Adult	Danny Chung Does Not Do Maths	Won	
2022	Branford Boase Award		Danny Chung Does Not Do Maths	Won	
2022	Diverse Book Awards	Children's	Danny Chung Does Not Do Maths	Shortlisted	
2022	Diverse Book Awards	Children's	The Very Merry Murder Club	3rd	
2023	Juniper Book Awards	Book of the Year	Keep Dancing, Lizzie Chu	Shortlisted	
2026	ALCS Annual Awards	Ruth Rendell Award		Shortlisted	
