= Yvonne Battle-Felton =

American writer

- Born: Germantown, Pennsylvania, U.S.
- Education: Johns Hopkins University, Lancaster University
- Occupation: Writer
- Writing career
- Genres: Fiction, children's fiction
- Notable works: Remembered, Curdle Creek
- Notable awards: Shirley Jackson Award (Best Novel), Northern Writers Award (Fiction and Narrative Non-Fiction)

Yvonne Battle-Felton is a novelist and children's book author. She won the Shirley Jackson Award for Best Novel, has been long-listed for the Women’s Prize for Fiction (2019), and shortlisted for the Jhalak Prize (2020).

== Background ==
Battle-Felton was born in Germantown, Philadelphia and raised in South Jersey. She lived in Maryland for 20 years before moving to the UK and lives in Yorkshire, England.

== Career ==
Battle-Felton holds an MA in Writing from Johns Hopkins University and a PhD in Creative Writing from Lancaster University. Her PhD research at Lancaster explored the reuniting of African American families after Emancipation. She is an Associate Teaching Professor at Cambridge University and the Academic Director of Creative Writing for the Institute of Continuing Education. Before moving to the UK, Battle-Felton taught English and creative writing at Anne Arundel Community College, the Community College of Baltimore County and University of Maryland University College. She later became Principal Lecturer and Business and Enterprise Lead at Sheffield Hallam University, where she taught creative writing. In 2019, she was a British Library Eccles Centre Visiting Fellow.

Battle-Felton writes historical fiction, horror, short stories and creative nonfiction for adults, as well as fiction and nonfiction for children. Her work frequently explores motherhood, secrets, ghosts, identity and relationships, themes present in her novels Remembered and Curdle Creek. Her writing has been published in literary journals and anthologies including riverSedge, Assisi, Not Somewhere Else but Here: A Contemporary Anthology of Women and Place, Welter, Slices, and The Chesapeake Reader Literary Journal.

Battle-Felton has six children’s titles in Penguin Random House’s Ladybird series, including stories in Ladybird Tales of Crowns and Thrones and Ladybird Tales of Superheroes.

In 2017 her short story "Each of Us Drowning at Sea" was shortlisted for the 2017 Words and Women competition. The same year she receoved a Commended acknowledgment by the Faber Andlyn BAME Prize (now known as the FAB Prize).

Before its publication, the manuscript of Remembered won the 2017 Northern Writers' Award in the fiction and narrative nonfiction category. In 2018, Battle-Felton received a grant from the Society of Authors' Foundation to support her work on the novel. Following publication, Remembered was long-listed for the 2019 Not the Booker Prize.

Battle-Felton's second novel, Curdle Creek won the 2024 Shirley Jackson Award for Best Novel, was long-listed for the 2019 Women's Prize for Fiction, and shortlisted for the 2020 Jhalak Prize.

Since August 2022 she has hosted the literary podcast Bookable Space

== Awards and honors ==
| Year | Award | Work | Result |
|---|---|---|---|
| 2017 | Northern Writers Award, Fiction and Narrative Non-Fiction | Remembered | Won |
| 2017 | Words and Women Competition | "Each of Us Drowning at Sea" | Shortlisted |
| 2017 | Faber Andlyn BAME (FAB) Prize | For children's writing | Commended |
| 2018 | Sunderland University Waterstones SunStory Award | | |
| 2018 | Society of Author's Foundation Grant | Remembered | |
| 2019 | Not the Booker Prize | Remembered | Longlisted |
| 2019 | Women's Prize for Fiction | | Longlisted |
| 2020 | Jhalak Prize | | Shortlisted |
| 2024 | Shirley Jackson Award, Best Novel | Curdle Creek | Won |
