= Ashley Hickson-Lovence =

British author (born 1991)

- Born: Ashley Wayne Hickson-Lovence; 1991 (age 34–35); Homerton, London, England
- Education: University of Sussex; UCL Institute of Education; City, University of London; University of East Anglia
- Occupations: Author and lecturer
- Years active: 2019–present

Ashley Wayne Hickson-Lovence (born 1991) is a British author and lecturer in creative writing.

== Life ==
Hickson-Lovence was born at Homerton University Hospital in East London, England, and grew up in Hoxton and Holloway. He is of Saint Lucian, Grenadian and, through his paternal grandmother, a quarter Irish descent.

In 2012, Hickson-Lovence graduated from the University of Sussex with a Bachelor of Arts degree in English. After receiving his Postgraduate Certificate in Education from the UCL Institute of Education in 2014, he worked as a secondary school English teacher for five years.

In 2017, he completed his Master of Arts in Creative Writing and Publishing at City, University of London part-time, while teaching. He later pursued a PhD in Creative and Critical Writing at the University of East Anglia. He is a Lecturer in Creative Writing at the Arts University Bournemouth.

In his spare time, he formally observes semi-professional referees for the Football Association.

== Works ==
In 2019, he published his debut novel The 392, set on a London bus travelling from Hoxton to Highbury. The narrative takes place over 36 minutes, exploring the perspectives of the passengers on a journey through gentrified London. Alice Jones, writing for Hackney Citizen, praised the realism of the novel, saying: "That's the beauty of this novel; I don't think I've ever read a book that seemed so real. And this sense of realism is underpinned by the novel's firm situation in East London; the route is signposted throughout, and locals will recognise the landmarks."

His second novel Your Show, published in 2022, is a novelisation of the professional life of Uriah Rennie, the Premier League's first and only black referee. The novel is told through a series of second-person scenes, and Anthony Cummins, writing in The Observer, praised its "freestyle poetry [...] teamed with kick-by-kick reports in this stirring novel about Uriah Rennie, the Premier League's first black match official," while Joseph Owen described it as "a percussive, breathless novel" in The Literary Review. Jonathan Lieu, writing for The Guardian's sports blog, noted the continued relevance of the novel to racialised exclusion in football and the ongoing abuse of referees. For Lieu, "the most affecting of the novel are the stuff we know happened".

Hickson-Lovence is currently writing his third novel, About to Fall Apart.

== Adaptations ==
In 2019, Second Generation acquired the rights to adapt The 392 for screen.

A stage adaptation of The 392 was penned by Toby Clarke. Produced by ALT Productions, the play had an Off West End in 2025 at Brixton House.

== Bibliography ==
=== Novels ===
- The 392 (2019, OWN IT!, ISBN 9781916052321)
- Your Show (2022, Faber & Faber, ISBN 9780571366798)
- Wild East (2024, Penguin Books, ISBN 9780241645444)

=== Essay ===
- "Why I Wish I Was a Drill Artist" (2022, Jacaranda Books Art Music Ltd, ISBN 9781913090944)
