= Guy Gunaratne =

British journalist, filmmaker and novelist (born 1984)

Guy Gunaratne FRSL
- Born: Neasden, London, England
- Education: Brunel University London; City, University of London
- Occupations: Journalist, filmmaker and novelist
- Notable work: In Our Mad and Furious City (2018)
- Awards: Dylan Thomas Prize; Jhalak Prize; Authors' Club Best First Novel Award
- Website: guygunaratne.com

Guy Gunaratne (born 1984) is a British journalist, filmmaker and novelist.

In 2019, their first novel, In Our Mad and Furious City, won the Dylan Thomas Prize, the Jhalak Prize and the Authors' Club Best First Novel Award. They are based between London, England, and Malmö, Sweden.

== Early life and education ==
Gunaratne was born and grew up in Neasden, north-west London, England. Their father had migrated from Sri Lanka in 1951. Gunaratne studied for a film and television degree at Brunel University London, then studied current affairs journalism at City, University of London.

== Career ==
With fellow student and girlfriend, Heidi Lindvall, Gunaratne set up a film production company. They made a film about the suppression of the media in Sri Lanka a week after the civil war there ended, the success of which allowed them to work in television. Though based in London, the couple followed their work in post-conflict areas around the world, living in several places, including Berlin, Germany.

During this period of making work for television, Gunaratne wrote their first novel, In Our Mad and Furious City. Its story is set in and around a north-west London council estate, in the 48 hours following a killing reminiscent of the 2013 murder of Lee Rigby. It is narrated by five main characters in turn, in first-person voices. In Our Mad and Furious City deals with "questions about Britain’s divided society and capturing the nuances of urban life".

As of 2019, they are based between London and Malmö, Sweden.

Gunaratne was elected a Fellow of the Royal Society of Literature (FRSL) in 2024.

== Publications ==
- —— (2018). In Our Mad and Furious City. London: Hachette. ISBN 9781472250193.
- —— (2023). Mister, Mister. Hachette. ISBN 9781472250261.

== Awards ==
Year	Title	Award	Category	Result	Ref.
2018	In Our Mad and Furious City	Goldsmiths Prize	—	Shortlisted	
2018	In Our Mad and Furious City	Gordon Burn Prize	—	Shortlisted	
2018	In Our Mad and Furious City	Man Booker Prize	—	Longlisted	
2018	In Our Mad and Furious City	Orwell Prize	Political Fiction	Longlisted	
2019	In Our Mad and Furious City	Authors' Club Best First Novel Award	—	Won	
2019	In Our Mad and Furious City	Dylan Thomas Prize	—	Won	
2019	In Our Mad and Furious City	Jhalak Prize	—	Won	
2024	Mister, Mister	Brooklyn Public Library Book Prize	Fiction	Longlisted	
