= Spread the Word =

Disability advocacy organization

Spread the Word: Inclusion
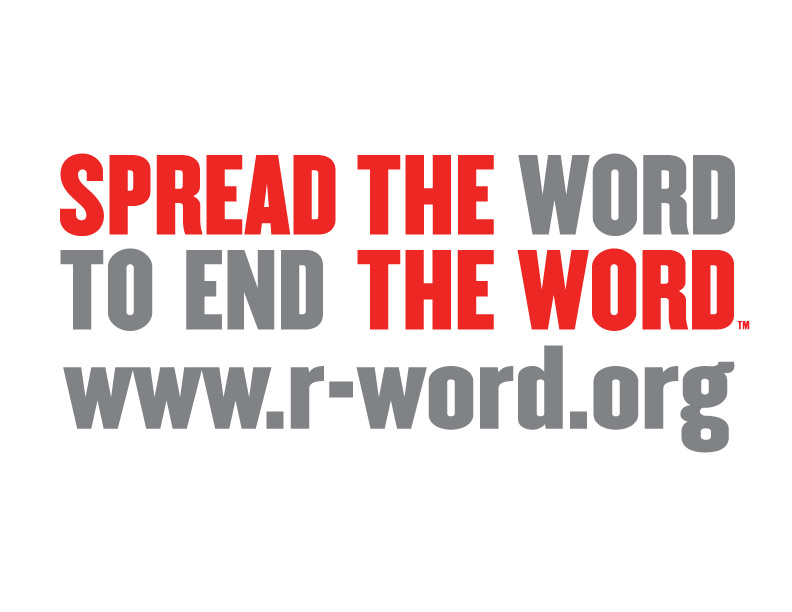
- Founded: February 2009; 17 years ago
- Purpose: Inclusion for all people with intellectual and developmental disabilities
- Origins: Special Olympics Global Youth Activation Summit
- Website: spreadtheword.global

Spread the Word: Inclusion is a global campaign working towards inclusion for all people with intellectual and developmental disabilities. It started as Spread the Word to End the Word, a US campaign to encourage people to pledge to stop using the R-Word ("retard" and "retarded"), but broadened both its goals and its scope in 2019.

== History ==
The Spread the Word to End the Word movement was established in 2009 during the Special Olympics Global Youth Activation Summit at the 2009 Special Olympics World Winter Games. The Spread the Word to End the Word movement was created by youth with and without intellectual disabilities. According to the Special Olympics:

“The motivation for the campaign was driven by a united passion to promote the positive contributions people with intellectual disabilities make to communities around the world combined with a simple call to action – a pledge to stop using the word – that also symbolizes positive attitude change and a commitment to make the world a more accepting place for all people.”

On March 31, 2009, the campaign celebrated the 1st Annual Spread the Word to End the Word National Awareness Day. Across the country, students of all ages made a pledge to eliminate the R-Word ("retard" or "retarded") from their vocabulary and encourage others to do the same. In 2010, the 2nd Annual Spread the Word to End the Word National Day of Awareness took place on March 3, 2010. Since 2010, the global awareness day takes place on the first Wednesday in the month of March.

In January 2010, the news of the past summer use of "retards" by White House chief of staff Rahm Emanuel to describe liberal groups planning attack ads on Democrats was reported in the Wall Street Journal. This led to Emanuel's apologizing to Tim Shriver, chief executive of the Special Olympics. A meeting was held with Emanuel, who was asked to visit www.r-word.org, and he promised to take the R-Word pledge.

In 2019, Spread the Word to End the Word rebranded and changed the nam to Spread the Word, and extended its focus to inclusion for all people with intellectual and developmental disabilities. The campaign takes a three-prong approach, offering different areas to raise awareness and "how to Spread the Word": derogatory language, bullying, and inclusive action. The Spread the Word campaign appeals to all people to make a pledge to have more inclusion in their communities, schools, and places of work.
