= Media Diversified =

Nonprofit organisation for writers of colour

Media Diversified was a UK-based nonprofit media and advocacy organisation for writers and journalists of colour, founded by filmmaker Samantha Asumadu in 2013. It published nonfiction articles by a variety of writers at its website, which was updated several times a week. Although much of Media Diversified's staff were UK-based, its pool of writers and its readership were international. All staff members and writers were people of colour.

Major topics covered by the site include discrimination against Black, Asian, and minority ethnic people, politics, immigration, Islamophobia, intersectionality, history, popular culture, and global conflict.

== History ==
Journalist Samantha Asumadu, whose work focuses on stereotype-challenging individuals and organizations, such as female rally drivers in Uganda, started the #AllWhiteFrontPages campaign in 2013 to critique the predominance of white people in mainstream newspaper photography. Media Diversified was created that same year to advance the profiles of journalists and writers of colour.

Two years later, Media Diversified launched the Experts Directory, a database of experts of colour aimed at media organisations. To date, the Experts Directory is the only such database in the UK.

In the same year, the organisation debuted The Trashies, "[the] equivalent of Hollywood's Razzies" for journalism, to critique racist, Islamophobic and xenophobic coverage in mainstream media. The "winner", chosen by popular vote, was Grace Dent for her 23 February 2015 article in The Independent on the British teenagers who left the country to join ISIS.

In February 2016, Media Diversified presented Bare Lit, the first literary festival in the UK for authors of colour. The festival took place over 26–28 February at the Free Word Centre and the Betsey Trotwood public house in Clerkenwell, London.

The closure of Media Diversified was announced in May 2019, when founder Asumadu said: "The plan is to keep our archives up in perpetuity. We’ll also keep our ebook store going in order to fund the domain and any other charges that are incurred during our winding down period....I think the biggest gift we could ever give is our promise to keep the site up for as long as it is possible. It’s an invaluable archive. Go browse."

== In other media ==
The work of Media Diversified writers has led to increased coverage of under-recognized issues in the mainstream media, such as The Guardian's 2015 article on black people in the UK dying in police custody and the child sexual abuse perpetrated by UN peacekeeping troops.

Owen Jones, writing in The Guardian on anti-EU migrant bigotry in the wake of Brexit, cited a Media Diversified open letter about the BBC giving platforms to racists and fascists.

== Accolades ==
In 2015, Samantha Asumadu was named as one of the Libertine 100, a list of 100 influential female thinkers in the UK, for her filmmaking and her work with Media Diversified. The following year, she was chosen to be a judge at the 2016 Comment Awards for journalism.
