= Jacob Ross =

Grenadian writer (born 1956)

Jacob Ross FRSL
- Born: 1956 (age 69–70); Hope Vale, Grenada
- Education: Grenada Boys' Secondary School; University of Grenoble
- Occupations: Poet, playwright, journalist, novelist and creative writing tutor
- Notable work: The Bone Readers (2016)
- Awards: Jhalak Prize

Jacob Ross FRSL (born 1956) is a Grenada-born poet, playwright, journalist, novelist, and creative writing tutor who has been based in the UK since 1984.

== Life and career ==
Jacob Ross was born in Hope Vale on the Caribbean island of Grenada, where he attended the Grenada Boys' Secondary School, later studying at the University of Grenoble, France. Since 1984, he has resided in Britain. He was formerly an editor of Artrage, an intercultural arts magazine, and is now associate fiction editor at Peepal Tree Press and associate editor of SABLE Literary Magazine. He has judged the Scott Moncrieff Prize (for French translation), the V. S. Pritchett Memorial Prize (2008) and the Tom-Gallon Trust Award (2009).

Ross has toured and lectured widely, including in Germany, Korea, the Middle East, and The Caribbean. In 2000, he was specially commissioned by the Peabody Trust to run the Millennium Writers Master class and in November that year became writer in residence for the London Borough of Streatham's Community Zone Literature Development Initiative. He was Writer-in-Residence at St. George's University in Grenada and the Darat Al Funun Arts Academy in Jordan in 2001.

== Writing ==
In 1986, his first collection of short stories, Song for Simone, was published and was described as "one of the most powerful crystallisation of Caribbean childhood since George Lamming's In the Castle of My Skin." Song for Simone has been translated into several languages. Of Ross's second collection, A Way to Catch the Dust and Other Stories (1999), Bernardine Evaristo wrote in Wasafiri: "These stories are refined, timeless and startlingly beautiful and if Walcott is the poet laureate of the Caribbean Sea then with this collection, Ross becomes a major contender as its chief prose stylist.... Ross, following in the tradition of Hemingway and Morrison, displays all the brilliance of a great storyteller in action."

His first novel, Pynter Bender, was published in 2008. It was shortlisted for 2009's Commonwealth Writers' Prize, the Society of Authors' "Best First Novel" and the Caribbean Review of Books "Book of the Year". Ross is also the editor of Closure: Contemporary Black British Short Stories, published by Peepal Tree Press.

His second novel, The Bone Readers, was published in 2016 and was awarded the inaugural Jhalak Prize.

In November 2017, Ross published his collected stories, Tell No-One About This. David Constantine wrote:

Such good writing! A truthful examination of our fraught, unsteady and ambivalent relations with one another and with the world we live in. Jacob Ross writes out of an intense and loving knowledge of particular places. His writing is unsentimental, clear-sighted, urgently insistent on the possibility of more humane dealings. And his lyricism, the making of beautiful sentences, is always an answering back against the fear that we may never do better than we are doing now.

== Awards and recognition ==
- 2006: Fellow of the Royal Society of Literature
- 2017: Jhalak Prize for Book of the Year by a Writer of Colour for The Bone Readers.
- 2022: Runner-up German Crime Fiction Prize (Deutscher Krimi Preis), International Category (2nd Place) https://www.librarything.com/award/1021.0.0.2022/German-Crime-Fiction-Prize-2022

== Selected writings and editorial work ==
- Song for Simone and Other Stories (London: Karia Press, 1986; ISBN 978-0946918294)
- Behind the Masquerade: The Story of Notting Hill Carnival (with Kwesi Owusu) (Arts Media Group, 1988; ISBN 978-0951277003)
- Voice, Memory, Ashes: Lest We Forget (co-edited with Dr Joan Anim-Addo) (London: Mango Publishing, 1998; ISBN 978-1902294049)
- A Way to Catch the Dust and Other Stories (London: Mango Publishing, 1999; ISBN 978-1902294087)
- Ridin' n Risin: Short stories by new black writers (Black Inc) and Turf (co-edited with Andrea Enisuoh)
- Closure: Contemporary Black British Short Stories (Peepal Tree Press, 2015; edited by Jeremy Poynting and Jacob Ross; ISBN 978-1-84523-288-7)
- Tell No-One About This (Peepal Tree Press, 2017) ISBN 978-1-84523-352-5
- The Peepal Tree Book of Contemporary Caribbean Short Stories (Peepal Tree Press, 2018; ISBN 978-1-84523-410-2)
- Pynter Bender (Harper Perennial, 2008; ISBN 978-0007222988)
- The Bone Readers (Peepal Tree Press, 2016; ISBN 978-1845233358)
- Black Rain Falling (London: Hachette, 2020; ISBN 9780751574425)
- Weighted Words, An Anthology of Creative Writing (Peepal Tree Press, Readers and Writers Series 2021) ISBN 978-1-84523-518-5
- Sanctuary, An Anthology of Creative Writing (Peepal Tree Press, 2024; ISBN 978-1-84523-595-6)
