= Manchester Caribbean Carnival =

Caribbean carnival in Manchester, England

Manchester Caribbean Carnival is an annual celebration of Caribbean culture held at Alexandra Park in Manchester. Its programme has included a procession through Moss Side and Hulme, music and dance, costumes, Caribbean food, workshops and family activities. The park is the event’s main gathering place.

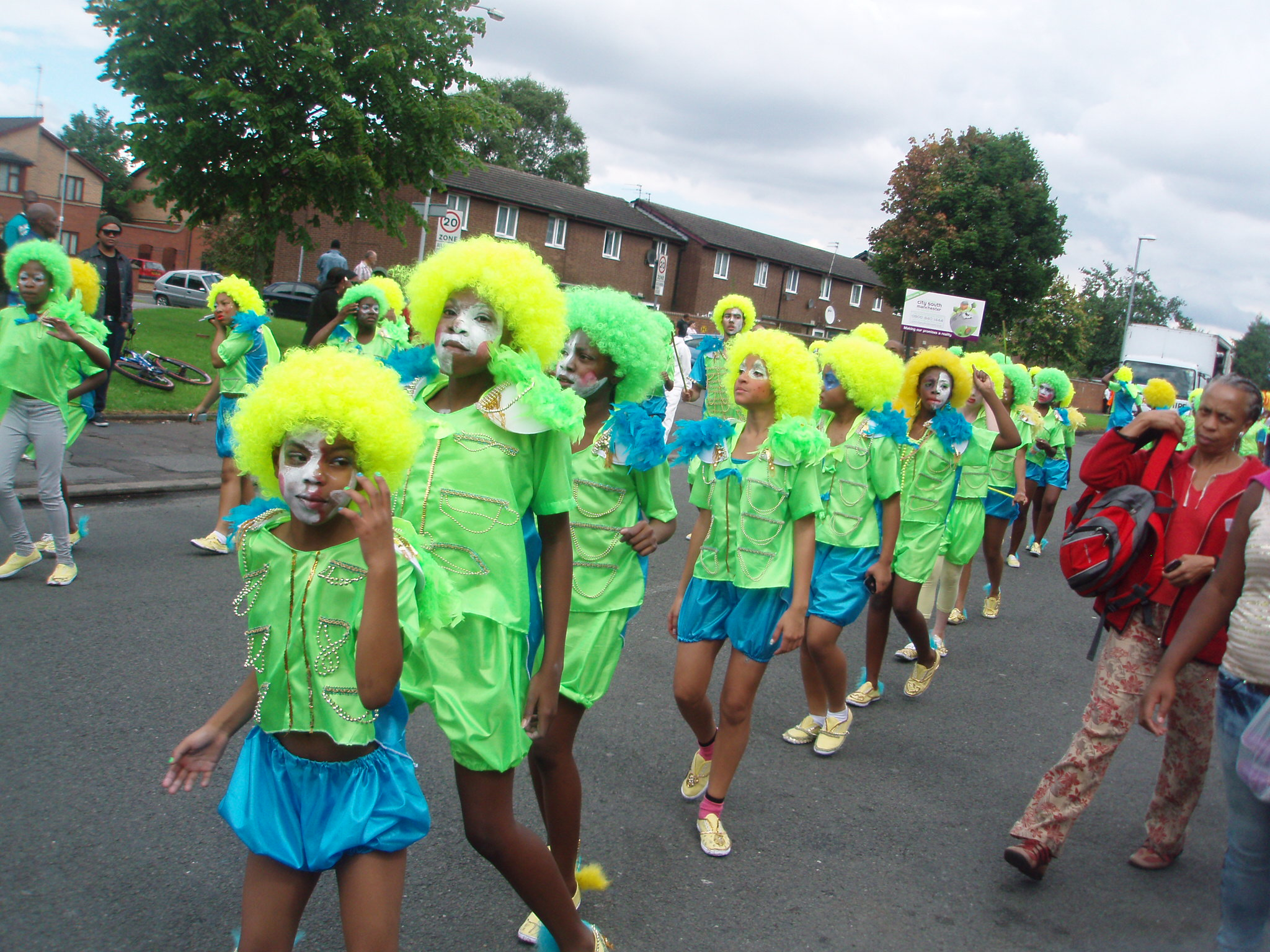
Manchester Caribbean Carnival troupe with wigs

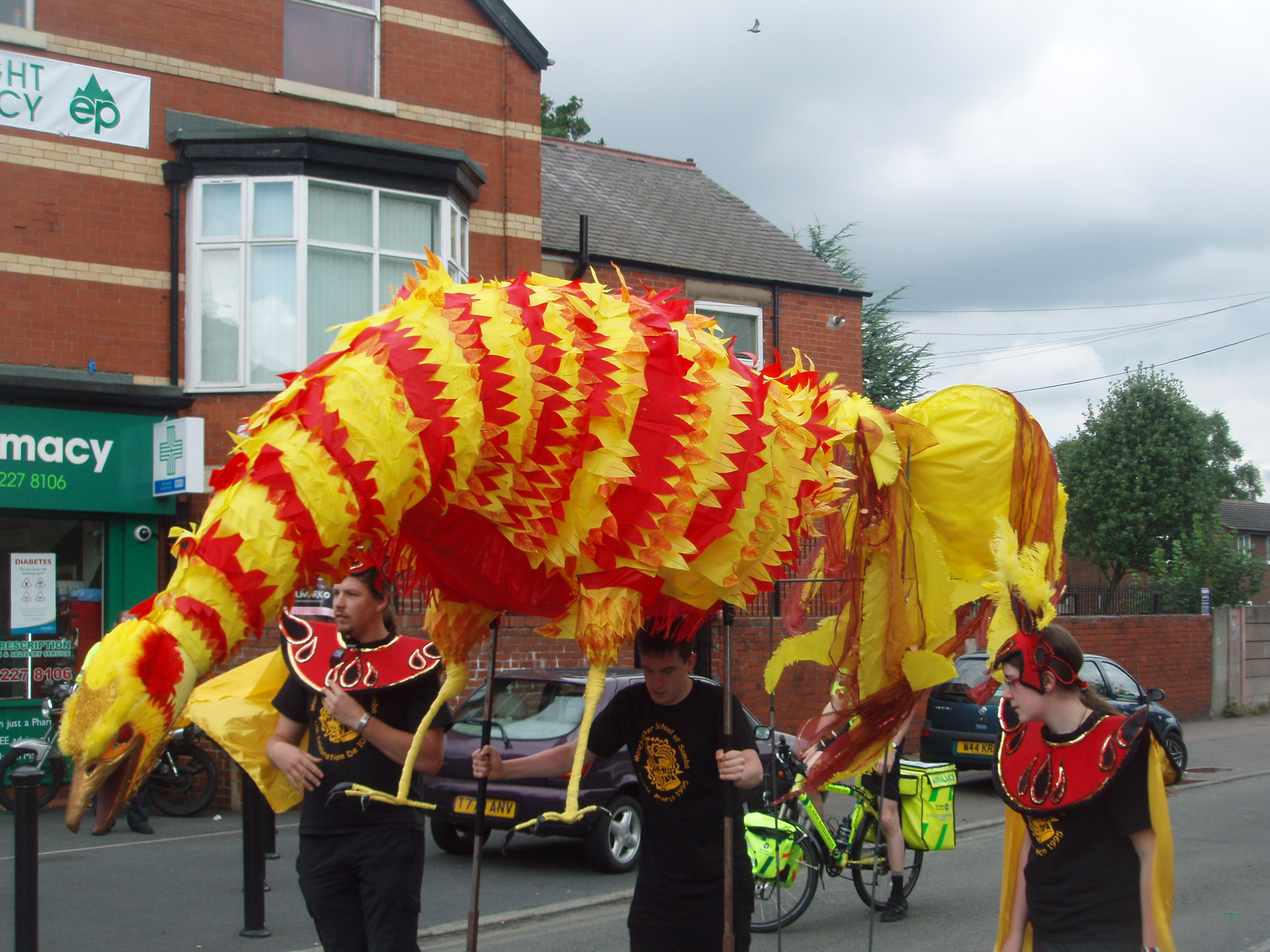
Manchester Caribbean Carnival dragon 2010

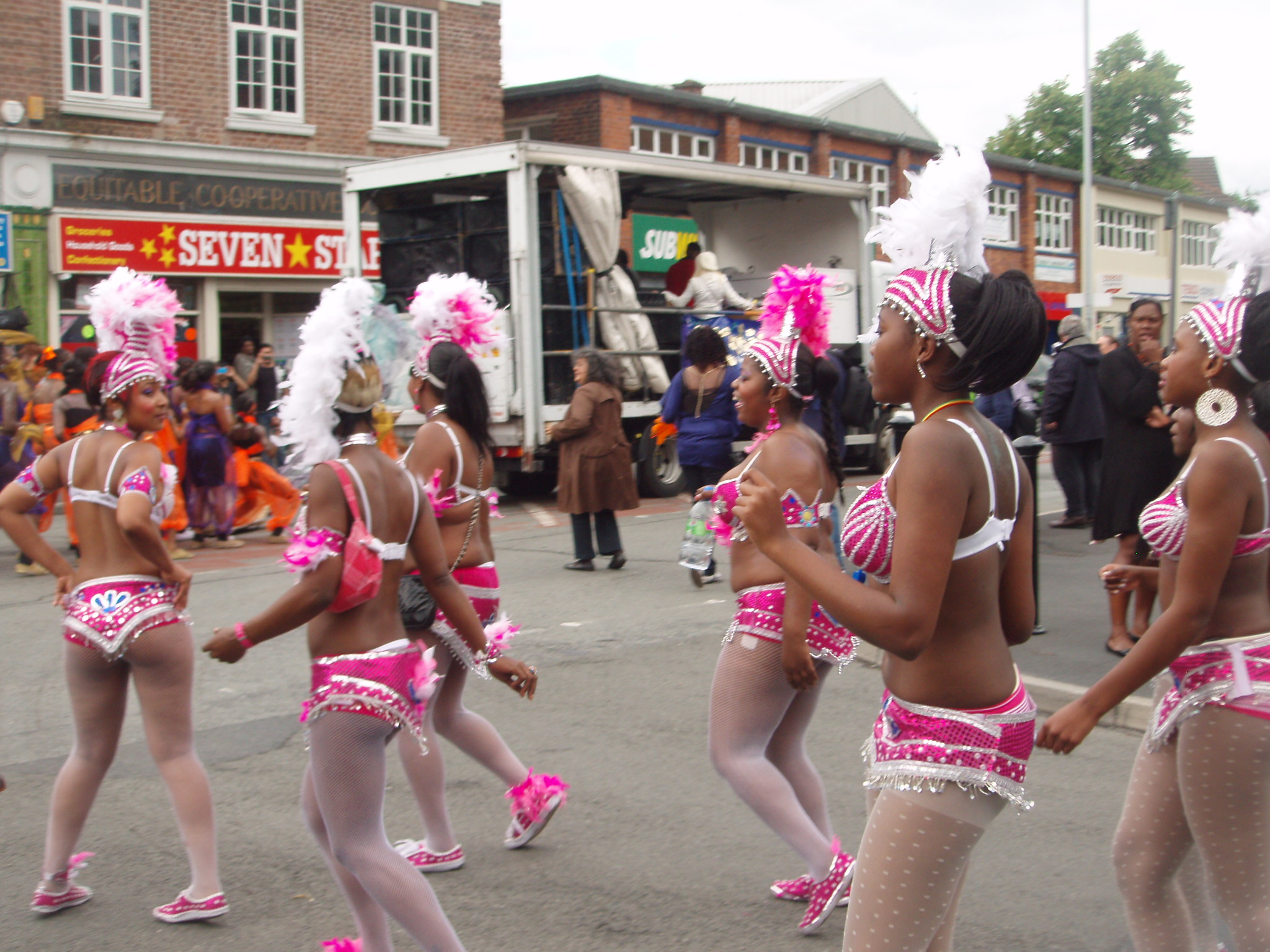
Manchester Caribbean Carnival girls

== History ==
=== Origins ===
Sources give different dates for the carnival’s beginnings. A 2010 Manchester Evening News article said Billy Hanley organised an initial carnival at Belle Vue Hall in 1970 and that it became an annual event at Alexandra Park in 1972. A 2013 retrospective described the park as the carnival’s focal point since its launch in 1971. A 2020 history published by the University of Manchester distinguishes a community procession in 1970 from the West Indian carnival organised in Alexandra Park, which it dates to 1972; it notes that some media accounts give 1973.

Locita Brandy was a founding member and chairperson of the Manchester Alexandra Park Carnival Association (MAPCA), the organising committee, from 1970 to 1997. She worked with members of the Leeward Island People Association to establish the celebration, drawing on memories of carnival in St Kitts and Nevis. The University of Manchester history describes Brandy and the association as central to organising and sustaining the event during its early years. A 2026 profile in the Manchester Evening News also described Brandy’s contribution to the carnival and to community life in Manchester.

=== 1980s and 1990s ===
The University of Manchester history describes organisers’ efforts during the 1970s and 1980s to involve Moss Side’s South Asian and Chinese communities. Abasindi, a Manchester Black women’s cooperative, took part in the carnival’s cultural activities during the 1980s, including dance. Brandy remained chairperson of MAPCA until 1997.

=== 2000s ===
After the event was revamped and relaunched in 2004, the 2005 carnival was extended to two days for the first time. The programme included a procession through Moss Side, steel bands, floats, music in the park, arts and crafts stalls, Caribbean food and free youth dance workshops.

=== 2010s ===
In 2015, the carnival returned to Alexandra Park after being held at Platt Fields Park for two years while Alexandra Park underwent renovation. The return included a parade through Moss Side and Hulme, six stages of entertainment, food stalls and activities for families.

The 2017 programme included a J’ouvert procession, a larger carnival parade, live entertainment across ten stages, costume-making workshops and food stalls. The parade featured steel drums, dance and costumes, while the event’s programme celebrated Caribbean culture and music.

=== Caribbean Carnival of Manchester (CCoM) ===
Prior to 2019, the event was delivered by Caribbean Carnival of Manchester (CCoM).

In 2019, a BBC investigation reported concerns about the finances of the Caribbean Carnival of Manchester. The report said Arts Council England had stopped its direct funding in 2013, citing concerns about artistic quality, including the repeated use of costumes. A former accountant said he had refused to sign off the accounts because of insufficient documentation, while a former committee secretary alleged that invoices and contracts were often not kept. Manchester City Council said it had found no evidence of theft or misappropriation in the limited information available, but called for stronger measures to account for transactions.

=== Manchester Carnival Together (MCT) ===
Manchester Carnival Together CIC (MCT) began delivering the carnival in 2021, when it organised a one-day event at Alexandra Park called “Road to Carnival 50”. The programme included live stages, steel pan music, dance, DJs, food and fairground attractions. In 2022, the carnival returned as a two-day event at the park, marking its 50th anniversary and 60 years of Jamaican independence. BBC News covered seven-year-old Lottie joining Jamaican singer Serani on stage; videos of the performance were widely shared.

The 2023 carnival included a parade, J’ouvert procession, live music and family activities, and was linked to the 75th anniversary of the arrival of the Empire Windrush. MCT reported that the weekend drew more than 58,000 people. In 2024, the event continued in Alexandra Park and the surrounding area, with a unity theme, Caribbean music and dance, food, family activities and a youth stage. The 2025 programme again featured the parade, music, food stalls and family activities, with the event promoting Caribbean heritage and community participation.

In 2026, MCT delivered the carnival for the fifth year. The programme included J’ouvert, a parade featuring 17 troupes, music and performances at Alexandra Park. The Manchester Evening News reported that organisers expected about 60,000 visitors across the two days.

Since taking over delivery of the carnival in 2021, Manchester Carnival Together CIC (MCT) has received support from Arts Council England for its carnival projects.

== Policing and public safety ==
In 2022, Greater Manchester Police sent exclusion letters to people it believed had links to gangs, barring them from the carnival. The policy was criticised by civil liberties and community organisations. After a legal challenge, police said they would not send the letters for the 2023 carnival.

Serious violence also occurred at separate street parties on Claremont Road after the carnival in 2018 and 2022. See Gun crime in south Manchester for details.

Greater Manchester Police reported that the 2026 carnival passed without major incident with live facial recognition being used by GMP.
