= List of Guyanese writers =

This is a list of notable Guyanese writers.

* Khalil Rahman Ali (b. 1950)

== A ==
- Michael Abbensetts (1938–2016)
- John Agard (b. 1949)
- Arif Ali (b. 1935)
- Andaiye (1942–2019)

== B ==
- Harold Bascom
- Dale Bisnauth (1936–2013)
- E. R. Braithwaite (1912–2016)

== C ==
- N. E. Cameron (1903–1983)
- Jan Carew (1920–2012)
- Martin Carter (1927–1997)
- Brian Chan
- Bertram Charles (1937–1994)

== D ==
- Fred D'Aguiar (b. 1960)
- Cyril Dabydeen (b. 1945)
- David Dabydeen (b. 1955)
- Mahadai Das (b. 1954)
- O. R. Dathorne (1934–2007)
- David de Caires (1937–2008)
- Raywat Deonandan
- Brenda DoHarris (b. 1946)

== G ==
- Michael Gilkes (1933–2020)
- Beryl Gilroy (1924–2001)
- David A. Granger (b. 1945)
- Cy Grant (1919–2010)
- Stanley Greaves (b. 1934)

== H ==
- Wilson Harris (1921–2018)
- Kingsley Ormonde Harrop-Williams (1932–2020)
- Roy Heath (1926–2008)
- Abdur Rahman Slade Hopkinson (1934–1993)
- Eric Lindbergh Huntley (1925–2026)

== J ==
- Janet Jagan (1920–2009)
- George James (1893–1956)
- Meiling Jin (b. 1956)
- Ruel Johnson

== K ==
- Laxmi Kallicharan (1951–2002)
- Kampta Karran (d. 2013)
- Oonya Kempadoo (b. 1966)
- Peter Kempadoo (1926–2019)
- Harischandra Khemraj (b. 1944)
- Karen King-Aribisala
- Freddie Kissoon (b. 1951)
- Eusi Kwayana (1925–2026)

== M ==
- Sharon Maas (b. 1951)
- Yolanda T. Marshall (b. 1978)
- Egbert Martin (1861–1890)
- Wordsworth McAndrew (1936–2008)
- Ian McDonald (1933–2026)
- Mark McWatt (b. 1947)
- Marc Matthews (b. 1940s)
- Pauline Melville (b. 1948)
- Edgar Mittelholzer (1909–1965)
- Paloma Mohamed
- Rooplal Monar

== N ==
- Moses Nagamootoo (b. 1947)
- Grace Nichols (b. 1950)
- Elly Niland (b. 1954)

== P ==
- Mike Phillips (b. 1941)

== R ==
- Peter Ramsaroop (b. 1962)
- Angus Richmond (1925–2007)
- John R. Rickford (b. 1949)
- Walter Rodney (1942–1980)
- Gordon Rohlehr (1942–2023)
- Rupert Roopnaraine (1943–2026)

== S ==
- Lloyd Searwar (1925–2006)
- Clem Seecharan (b. 1950)
- Berkley Semple
- A. J. Seymour (1914–1989)
- Ryhaan Shah
- Narmala Shewcharan
- Jan Shinebourne (b. 1947)
- Rajkumari Singh (1923–1979)
- Gokarran Sukhdeo

== T ==
- Maya Tiwari (b. 1952)

== V ==
- Ian Valz (1957–2010)

== W ==
- Eric D. Walrond (1898–1966)
- Denis Williams (1923–1998)
- N. D. Williams (b. 1942)

== Y ==
- Shana Yardan (1943–1989)

== See also ==
- List of Guyanese
- List of Guyanese artists
