= List of Guyanese women writers =

This is a list of women writers of Guyana.

== A-M ==
- Andaiye (1942–2019)
- Mahadai Das (1954–2003)
- Evadne D'Oliveira (1929–2010)
- Brenda DoHarris (b. 1946)
- Beryl Gilroy (1924–2001)
- Janet Jagan (1920–2009)
- Meiling Jin (b. 1956)
- Laxmi Kallicharan (1951–2002)
- Oonya Kempadoo (b. 1966)
- Karen King-Aribisala (living)
- Sharon Maas (b. 1951)
- Yolanda T. Marshall (b. 1978)
- Pauline Melville (b. 1948)

== N-Z ==
- Grace Nichols (b. 1950)
- Elly Niland (b. 1954)
- Ryhaan Shah (living)
- Rajkumari Singh (1923–1979)
- Narmala Shewcharan (living)
- Jan Shinebourne (b. 1947)
- Rajkumari Singh (1923–1979)
- Maya Tiwari (b. 1952)
