= List of Guyanese =

The Guyanese people are people of the South American nation of Guyana. Guyanese people come from a wide range of backgrounds and cultures, including indigenous, African, Indian, Chinese, and European ethnic groups. Although citizens make up the majority of Guyanese, there is a substantial number of Guyanese expatriates, dual citizens and descendants living worldwide, chiefly elsewhere in the Anglosphere.

== Actors and entertainers ==
- Robert Adams (1902–1965), British Guyanese actor, of stage and screen
- Harry Baird (1931–2005), Guyanese-born British actor
- Marc Matthews (born c. 1940), actor, broadcaster, writer, and producer
- CCH Pounder (born 1952), Guyanese–American actress
- Jacob Scipio (born 1993), British actor of Guyanese origin
- Tony Tornado (born 1930), Brazilian actor of Guyanese origin
- Ian Valz (1957–2010), actor, playwright and filmmaker
- Ashley Walters (born 1982), British actor, rapper of Guyanese and Jamaican origin
- T-Bone Wilson, Guyanese-born British actor, dramatist, and poet

== Artists ==
- Kwesi Abbensetts, Guyanese-born American photographer
- Rihanna, Barbadian singer of Guyanese descent
- Central Cee, British Rapper of Guyanese descent
- Damali Abrams, American-born video artist and performance artist, of Guyanese descent
- George Barber (born 1958), British Guyanese video artist
- Frank Bowling (born 1939), British Guyanese painter, based in the United Kingdom
- Theresa Chromati (born 1992) American-born painter, of Guyanese descent
- Victor Davson (born 1948), Guyanese-born American collagist, curator, and gallerist
- Ann Gollifer (born 1960) British Guyanese painter, printmaker, writer and photographer, based in Gaborone, Botswana
- Maggie Harris, poet, writer, and visual artist, based in the United Kingdom
- Oswald Hussein (born 1946), Guyanese sculptor of wood, of Lokono descent
- Donald Locke (1930–2010), drafter, painter, sculptor
- Hew Locke (born 1959), Scottish-born sculptor, raised in Guyana and based in London
- Leila Locke (1936–1992), English-born Guyanese painter
- Suchitra Mattai (born 1973), Guyanese-born American multidisciplinary contemporary artist
- Philip Moore (1921–2012), sculptor and painter
- Bernadette Persaud (born 1946), painter
- Ingrid Pollard (born 1953) British Guyanese photographer
- Lenny Prince (born 1965), Guyanese-born American sculptor and large scale installation artist
- Doris Rogers (1929–2016), Guyanese academic who specialized in fine arts

== Athletes ==
- Martin Braithwaite (born 1991), Danish professional footballer, of Guyanese descent
- Shivnarine Chanderpaul (born 1974), cricket coach and former captain of the West Indies cricket team
- Nicolette Fernandes (born 1983), British squash player, representing Guyana
- Lance Gibbs (born 1934), cricketer
- Carl Hooper (born 1966), cricketer
- Rohan Kanhai (born 1935), cricketer
- Cyril Langevine (born 1998), Guyanese–American professional basketball center in the Israeli Basketball Premier League
- Clive Lloyd (born 1944), British Guyanese cricketer
- Ramnaresh Sarwan (born 1980), cricketer
- Kwesi Sinclair (born 1978), Guyanese-born cricketer who represented British Virgin Islands

== Businesspeople ==
- Arif Ali (born 1935), Guyana-born British publisher, and newspaper proprietor
- Elizabeth Swain Bannister (1785–1828), Barbadian-born businessperson and freewoman, who lived in Berbice, a Dutch Colony (what is now Guyana)
- John Meredith Ford (1923–1995), businessman and politician

== Musicians ==
- Anjulie (born 1983), Canadian singer of Indo-Guyanese descent
- Aubrey Cummings (1947–2010), Guyana-born Barbadian musician
- Central Cee (born 1998), English rapper of Guyanese and Chinese ancestry
- Olivia Dean (born 1999), English singer of Guyanese descent
- Leona Lewis (born 1985), English singer of Guyanese descent
- Lynette Dolphin (1916–2000), musician, educator, chair of the Guyana Department of Culture
- Rudolph Dunbar (1907–1988), conductor, composer, musician
- Melanie Fiona (born 1983), Canadian singer and songwriter, of Guyanese descent
- Eddy Grant (born 1948), British Guyanese singer, songwriter
- Keko (Guyanese rapper) (born 1974), rapper, radio personality
- Phil Lynott (1949–1986), Irish musician of Guyanese descent, lead vocalist, bassist, and songwriter for Thin Lizzy
- Preme (born 1986; also known as P. Reign), Canadian rapper, singer, songwriter, and record producer, of Guyanese descent
- Red Café (born 1976; born as Jermaine Alfred Denny), Guyanese-born American rapper
- Rihanna (born 1988), Barbadian singer, of Afro-Guyanese descent on her maternal side
- Saint Jhn (born 1986; born as Carlos St. John Phillips), American rapper, raised in Guyana
- Sandhja (born 1991), Finnish singer, of Indo-Guyanese and Finnish descent
- Sol Raye (1936–2006), cabaret musician

== Politicians and activists ==
- Margaret Ackman (?–2013), politician and a founding member of the People’s National Congress Reform
- Andaiye (1942–2019), social, political, and gender rights activist
- Antony Beaujon (c. 1763–1805), civil servant and politician
- Juan Edghill (born 1964), pastor and politician; founder and bishop of Zadok Ministers Fellowship
- John Meredith Ford (1923–1995), businessman and politician
- Valerie Hart (1933–2021), indigenous political leader from the Wapishana ethnic group and a member of Guyana's Amerindian Party
- Jim Jones (1931-1978), American cult leader, expatriate in Guyana, and founder of Jonestown
- Abdul Kadir (1952-2018), politician, convicted terrorist
- Edwina Melville (1926–1993), writer, teacher, politician, and advocate of the Wapishana peoples

== Writers ==
- Michael Abbensetts (1938–2016), Guyana-born British playwright and screenwriter
- John Agard (born 1949), Guyana-born British playwright, poet and children's writer
- Arif Ali (born 1935), Guyana-born British publisher, and newspaper proprietor
- E. R. Braithwaite (1912–2016), writer
- Jan Carew (1920–2012), Guyana-born novelist, playwright, poet and educator
- Martin Carter (1927–1997), poet and political activist
- David Dabydeen (born 1955), Guyanese-born broadcaster, writer and academic
- Wilson Harris (1921–2018) poet, novelist
- Roy Heath (1926–2008) Guyanese-born writer, based in the UK
- Matthew James Higgins (1810–1868), British writer, he lived part time in British Guiana
- Edgar Mittelholzer (1909–1965), novelist
- Walter Rodney (1942–1980), politician, activist and historian
- Ivan Van Sertima (1935–2009) Guyanese-born British Africanist and academic
- A. J. Seymour (1914–1989), writer, editor, and publisher
- Eric Walrond (1898–1966), British Guyanese-born American writer and journalist, associated with the Harlem Renaissance
- Shana Yardan (1943–1989), poet and broadcaster

== See also ==
- List of Guyanese British people
- List of Eastern Caribbean people
