= List of Guyanese artists =

The following list of Guyanese artists (in alphabetical order by last name) includes artists of various genres, who are notable and are either born in Guyana, of Guyanese descent or who produce works that are primarily about Guyana.

== A ==
- Kwesi Abbensetts, Guyanese-born American photographer
- Damali Abrams, American-born video artist and performance artist, of Guyanese descent

== B ==
- George Barber (born 1958), British Guyanese video artist
- Frank Bowling (born 1939), British Guyanese painter, based in the United Kingdom

== C ==
- Theresa Chromati (born 1992) American-born painter, of Guyanese descent

== D ==
- Victor Davson (born 1948), Guyanese-born American collagist, curator, and gallerist

== F ==
- Fazan Munshi (born 2005), Guyanese-born American rapper, musician, and record producer

== G ==
- Ann Gollifer (born 1960) British Guyanese painter, printmaker, writer and photographer, based in Gaborone, Botswana
- Stanley Greaves (born 1934), painter

== H ==
- Maggie Harris, poet, writer, and visual artist, based in the United Kingdom
- Oswald Hussein (born 1946), Guyanese sculptor of wood, of Lokono descent

== L ==
- Donald Locke (1930–2010), drafter, painter, sculptor
- Hew Locke (born 1959), Scottish-born sculptor, raised in Guyana and based in London
- Leila Locke (1936–1992), English-born Guyanese painter

== M ==
- Suchitra Mattai (born 1973), Guyanese-born American multidisciplinary contemporary artist
- Philip Moore (1921–2012), sculptor and painter

== P ==
- Bernadette Persaud (born 1946), painter
- Ingrid Pollard (born 1953) British Guyanese photographer
- Lenny Prince (born 1965), Guyanese-born American sculptor and large scale installation artist

== R ==
- Doris Rogers (1929–2016), Guyanese academic who specialized in fine arts

== S ==
- George Simon (1947–2020), Guyanese Lokono/Arawak visual artist and archaeologist

== W ==
- Aubrey Williams (1926–1990), painter
- Denis Williams (1923–1998), painter, writer, and archaeologist

== See also ==
- List of Latin American artists
- List of Guyanese
