= Angus Richmond =

Guyanese writer

- Born: Angus Percy Bain Richmond; 10 January 1925; Georgetown, Guyana, British Guiana
- Died: 8 August 2007 (aged 82); London, England
- Occupation: Writer

Angus Percy Bain Richmond (10 January 1925 – 8 August 2007) was a Guyanese writer who spent most of his life in Britain.

== Biography ==
Richmond was born and raised in Georgetown, British Guiana (now Guyana). He won a scholarship to study at Queen's College in Georgetown and received an external BA in English, French and Latin from the University of London in 1946. He arrived in England in 1950, joined shortly after by his partner Bridget Elise Croal (1923–2013), whom he married in 1951 in London, England, where they settled. They had one daughter, Jean Evelyn Bridget (1952–2017).

His writing, which includes novels, short stories, poetry and essays, explores racial and class-based struggles, mostly within a Guyanese context.

He was awarded the 1978 Casa de las Américas Prize for his debut novel, A Kind of Living.

Richmond was close friends with fellow Guyanese writers John Agard and Grace Nichols.

== Awards ==
- 1978: Casa de las Américas Prize for A Kind of Living
- 1983: The President's Prize at the Association for Caribbean Studies Conference for the essay "The Sociology of the West Indian Novel in English"
- 1985: The Greater London Council Award for an unpublished manuscript
- 1989: The Guyana Prize for Fiction for The Open Prison (shortlisted)

== Bibliography ==
- A Kind of Living (1978)
- The Open Prison (1988)
- Shame (1988)

== See also ==
- Jan Carew
- Roy Heath
