= Amon Saba Saakana =

Trinidad-born writer, scholar and publisher (born 1948)

- Born: Sebastian Clarke; 1948 (age 77–78); Trinidad and Tobago
- Education: Mountview Theatre School; School of Oriental and African Studies; Goldsmiths College, University of London; Institute of Archaeology, University College London
- Occupations: Writer, journalist, lecturer, filmmaker and publisher
- Known for: Founder of publishing company Karnak House
- Website: amonsabasaakana.com

Amon Saba Saakana (born 1948), formerly known as Sebastian Clarke, is a Trinidad-born writer, journalist, lecturer, filmmaker and publisher, who migrated to Britain in 1965. In the 1970s, he founded the publishing imprint Karnak House in London. As an author, his books encompass poetry, fiction, literary criticism, and works on cultural and historical topics.

== Biography ==
=== Education and early career ===
Born Sebastian Clarke in Trinidad, he migrated as a teenager in 1965 with his six siblings to England, where their parents had come to work in a London factory. He studied playwriting at Mountview Theatre School (1966–1967), began visiting Paris in 1968 and connecting with Caribbeans and Africans there, then for four years from 1970 he lived in the United States, going there at the invitation of Ed Bullins, who had been in London for the production of some of his plays. In a 2019 interview, Saakana said: "Bullins also got me a job at Marymount College, a girls' school, as a drama tutor, and also got me a job as assistant editor at the New York Festival Public Theatre which went into publishing two drama journals, one for play scripts, the other for reviews, features, interviews and performance."

On returning in 1974 to London from the US, where he had also been inspired by the theatre work of LeRoi Jones (later Amiri Baraka), Saakana became a contributor to the drama magazine Plays & Players, and one of his plays, Soul of the Nation, was produced at the Royal Court Theatre in 1975, and ]moved to the Roundhouse for a two-week run.

Saakana was part of what Paul Breman described as "London's very active black literature scene of the early 1970s", which included the Caribbean Artists Movement. He worked as a freelance journalist in London between 1969 and 1981, writing on music, drama, and literature in such outlets as Time Out, the New Statesman, New Musical Express, Melody Maker, Sounds, Black Echoes, Caribbean Times, Race Today, The New African, and he was the founding editor of the journal Frontline. He also contributed to other international publications including Essence, The Amsterdam News, Crawdaddy, Présence Africaine, UNESCO Courier, Trinidad Newsday, and Bendel Times (Nigeria).

His contribution towards the making of the BBC TV documentary Reggae (1971), directed by Horace Ové, led Saakana to write his first nonfiction book, Jah Music: The Development of Jamaica Popular Music (1980), which was the first history of Jamaican popular music.

In 1982, he earned a Diploma of Higher Education in Caribbean Studies from the University of East London, followed by an MA in Caribbean literature from the same university (1988). His master's thesis was subsequently published as Colonialism & the Destruction of the Mind: Psychosocial issues of race, sexuality, class and gender in the novels of Roy Heath (1997). Saakana also studied at the School of Oriental and African Studies and at Goldsmiths College, University of London, where in 1995 he obtained his Ph.D. in Drama & Cultural Studies. He received a certificate (distinction) and diploma (merit) in Egyptian Archaeology from the Institute of Archaeology, University College London (1996–1998).

=== Karnak House ===
In 1975, Saakana founded the publishing company Karnak House, initially as Caribbean Cultural International (CCI), "an organization of writers and artists coming together to create a new platform for the work of Caribbean and Black British writers and artists in Britain." CCI was inspired by the work of Amiri Baraka, who founded a facility known as Spirit House in Newark, New Jersey. Saakana sought out a four-storey rent-free building from the Notting Hill Housing Trust and turned it into an arts centre, located since 1977 in Westbourne Park Road, Notting Hill, and renamed as Karnak House. The centre "soon transcended its regional perspective and included work by Africans in any geographical location as well as progressive Europeans of any nationality, a model well preceded by Society of African Culture in Paris." Karnak House put on exhibitions, conducted classes in African languages and organized lectures as well as conferences, involving a wide range of creatives and intellectuals from the African diaspora, including Alem Mezgebe, Emmanuel Jegede, Charles Sambono, Babatunde Banjoko, Seheri Sujai, Horace Ové, Errol Lloyd, Lance Watson, Norman Reid, and Vernon St. Hilaire.

Karnak House began publishing in 1979. Its stated objectives are "to continuously locate and publish books by Caribbean and African writers in the field of creative fiction and poetry" and "to renew and reinterpret African civilizations through the prism of Africans themselves or progressive writers of any ethnic background."

The imprint's first publication was New Planet, an anthology including both new and previously published poets such as John La Rose, Kamau Brathwaite and Marc Matthews. Among notable titles that Saakana has published is I is a Long-memoried Woman by Grace Nichols, which won the Commonwealth Poetry Prize in 1983. Karnak House authors have also included Cheikh Anta Diop, Hilary Beckles, Ifi Amadiume, Imruh Bakari, Jan Knappert, Yosef Ben-Jochannan, Maureen Warner-Lewis, Théophile Obenga, and Jacob Carruthers.

In 1985, Karnak House organised its first major international conference under the title The Afrikan Origin of Civilization, which featured Cheikh Anta Diop as the primary speaker, along with Ivan Van Sertima, and Carlos Moore. This led to Diop being brought to the US, being granted the key to the city of Atlanta by Mayor Andrew Young, and receiving wide coverage for his visit.

The continuing difficulties facing Black publishing houses such as Karnak House, New Beacon Books and others, including access to coverage on the books pages of the mainstream press, were highlighted by Saakana in a 1988 Washington Post article, which concludes: "Whatever the problems that have confronted the black press in London, it has injected into the mainstream an imaginative and dramatic body of diverse literature. ... Perhaps, then, indigenous black publishers have stirred the imagination of the mainstream and created an atmosphere, through conferences, forums, book fairs, etc., in which the black writer can be seen as an economic asset to a previously flagging British publishing industry."

Alongside his work as commissioning editor of Karnak House, Saakana is an independent scholar and does research in Philosophy, Literary Theory and African World Literatures.

=== Writing ===
Saakana's own books include poetry collections, the first study on Jamaican popular music, entitled Jah Music (1980), a 1985 novel Blues Dance (reviewing which Polly Toynbee wrote in The Guardian: "It is a harrowing book, bloody and violent, frightening and often mystifying, but through it all there is a surprising kind of optimism"), and works of literary criticism such as The Colonial Legacy in Caribbean Literature, as well a notable work on Guyanese novelist Roy A. K. Heath, entitled Colonialism and the Destruction of the Mind (1997).

=== As lecturer ===
Saakana has lectured at many educational institutions in Britain and the US, including the University of Warwick, University of Keele, Goldsmiths, University of London, the Institute of Education, University of Hull, Leicester University, University of Exeter, University of Essex, Reading University; City College of New York, Manhattan Community College, Staten Island Community College, Temple University, Wellesley College, University of Pennsylvania, and the University of North London. He also lectured at the College of Science, Technology and Applied Arts of Trinidad and Tobago.

=== Media work ===
Saakana directed and produced the films Texturing the Word: 40 Years of Caribbean Writing in Britain (1985, featuring George Lamming, Edward Brathwaite, Roy Heath, Linton Kwesi Johnson, Grace Nichols, Marc Matthews), and Ida's Daughter: The World of Eintou Pearl Springer (2010). He has also worked in various capacities on productions for the BBC and ITV.

== Selected bibliography ==
- Sun-Song (poetry), Paul Breman Ltd, 1973
- (As Sebastian Clarke; editor) New Planet: Anthology of Modern Caribbean Writing, Karnak House, 1978
- (As Sebastian Clarke) Jah Music: The Evolution of the Jamaican Popular Song, Heinemann Educational Books, 1980, ISBN 9780435821401
- Blues Dance (novel), Karnak House, 1985
- Tones & Colours (poetry), Karnak House, 1985
- The Colonial Legacy in Caribbean Literature (Preface by Ngugi Wa Thiong’o), Karnak House, 1987
- Colonialism & the Destruction of the Mind: Psycho-social Issues of Race, Religion, Sexuality & Gender in the Novels of Roy Heath, Karnak House, 1997
- God In The Song of Birds (poetry), 2016
- Djehuty/Hermes: Foundational Philosopher In The Italian Renaissance, Karnak House, 2020, ISBN 978-1-872596-31-0.
