= Michael Gilkes (writer) =

Guyanese writer (1933–2020)

- Born: Michael Arthur Gilkes; 5 November 1933; Georgetown, British Guiana
- Died: 14 April 2020 (aged 86); London, England
- Occupations: Literary critic, dramatist, poet, filmmaker and university lecturer
- Awards: Guyana Prize for Literature

Michael Arthur Gilkes (5 November 1933 – 14 April 2020) was a Caribbean literary critic, dramatist, poet, filmmaker and university lecturer. He was involved in theatre for more than 40 years, as a director, actor and playwright, winning the Guyana Prize for Drama in 1992 and 2006, as well as the Guyana Prize for Best Book of Poetry in 2002. He was also respected for his insight into and writings on the work of Wilson Harris.

== Biography ==
Gilkes was born in Georgetown, British Guiana (now Guyana). His involvement with theatre began in his native Guyana when he was about 12 years old, working in school theatre, and he went on to become involved with the Theatre Guild of Guyana.

Gilkes taught at a number of universities in the Caribbean, Canada and the United Kingdom over the past 40 years, including at the University of Kent at Canterbury, the University of Warwick, the University of Guyana, the University of the West Indies (where he served as Reader in English and Head of the English department) in Barbados and the Sir Arthur Lewis Community College in St. Lucia. He was a Quillian Visiting Professor at Randolph-Macon Woman's College. In Bermuda, he directed plays and taught a theatre workshop put on by the Department of Community & Cultural Affairs at The Berkeley Institute.

His work includes Couvade: A Dream-play of Guyana (published 1974), Wilson Harris and the Caribbean Novel (1975), and The Literate Imagination: Essays on the Novels of Wilson Harris (1989). In 1991, he directed Sargasso: A Caribbean Love Story, a hybrid film adaptation drawing on the 1966 novel Wide Sargasso Sea by Jean Rhys. An unfinished project that Gilkes was working on was the film Maira and the Jaguar People, set in the Rupununi region of Guyana in 2016, with a cast mainly featuring the indigenous Makushi population of Surama.

His play Couvade was first performed in 1972 at the first Carifesta, and in 1978 was produced at the Keskidee Centre in London, directed by Rufus Collins, with a cast including Imruh Caesar and others.

Gilkes died in London on 14 April 2020, aged 86, after contracting COVID-19.

== Awards ==
His play A Pleasant Career, about the life and fiction of Edgar Mittelholzer, won the Guyana Prize for Drama in 1992. Joanstown and other poems, a collection of poetry, won the Guyana Prize for Best Book of Poetry in 2002. Gilkes won the Guyana Prize for Drama again in 2006 for his play The Last of the Redmen.

== Selected bibliography ==
- Couvade: a dream-play of Guyana, Longman Caribbean, 1974
- Wilson Harris and the Caribbean Novel, Longman Caribbean, 1975
- Racial Identity and Individual Consciousness in the Caribbean Novel, 1975. (Edgar Mittelholzer memorial lectures)
- The West Indian Novel, Twayne, 1981
- Creative Schizophrenia: The Caribbean Cultural Challenge, Centre for Caribbean Studies, University of Warwick, 1987
- The Literate Imagination: Essays on the Novels of Wilson Harris, Macmillan Education, 1989, ISBN 978-0333495186
- Joanstown and Other Poems, Peepal Tree Press, 2002, ISBN 978-1900715768
- Two Plays: Couvade & A Pleasant Career (Caribbean Modern Classics), Peepal Tree Press, 2014, ISBN 978-1845231897
- Heart / Land: Poems on Love & Landscape, 2015, ISBN 978-1504947817
