= Leila Locke =

Guyanese artist

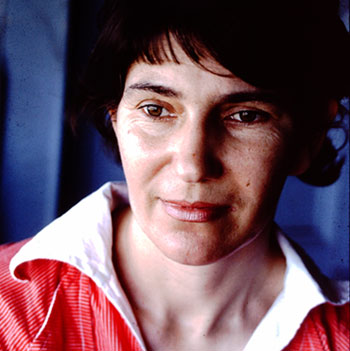
- Photograph of Leila Elizabeth Locke 1936–1992, taken by Donald Locke c. 1977
- Born: Leila Elizabeth Chaplin; April 27, 1936; England
- Died: April 11, 1992 (aged 55); A hospital in Barbados
- Education: Bath Academy of Art
- Spouse: Donald Locke (1958–1970s)
- Children: Hew Locke (born 1959); Jonathan Locke (born 1962) and Corrine Locke (born 1964)

Leila Elizabeth Locke (née Chaplin, 27 April 1936 – 11 April 1992) was a Guyanese artist. Born in England, she lived in Georgetown, Guyana, from 1958 until her death, taking out Guyanese citizenship in the early 1970s.

== Background ==
Leila Chaplin was born on 27 April 1936 in London, and was raised in Dartington, Devon. In 1957 she obtained a Diploma in Art Education from Bath Academy of Art, Corsham, specialising in painting, sculpture and pottery. She often returned to teaching in various schools in the UK and Guyana thereafter. At Corsham she had met sculptor Donald Locke. She travelled to Guyana to marry him in 1958 and in 1959 they moved to Edinburgh, while Donald studied at Edinburgh School of Art for four years. She had three children with Donald Locke: Hew Locke (born 1959), Jonathan Locke (born 1962) and Corinne Locke (born 1964). The couple divorced in the late 1970s. She died on 11 April 1992 in a hospital on Barbados.

== Work ==
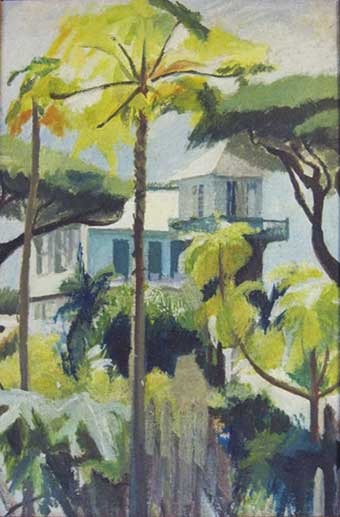
Main Street Georgetown by Leila Locke c. 1968

Artist and anthropologist Denis Williams described Leila Locke as being among those artists who created a vision of Guyana: "They laid the foundation to what I have called critically the Guyana School of Art which constituted a body of artists struggling to find a form of art out of the given circumstances of their environment. Leila Locke contributed to that movement in that she brought her English outlook to bear on our intimate backyards, our houses, our jalousies. She was intrigued by the geography of our landscape and gave us a brilliant view of ourselves through our work."

Locke cited Bonnard, Gauguin and Piero della Francesca as strong influences in her work. In the mid 1960s she produced paintings that are now referred to as her 'Kitty phase', after the Kitty district in which she lived. For some of these she would approach strangers and ask to paint their backyards. She recorded the varying activities and sights of local life.

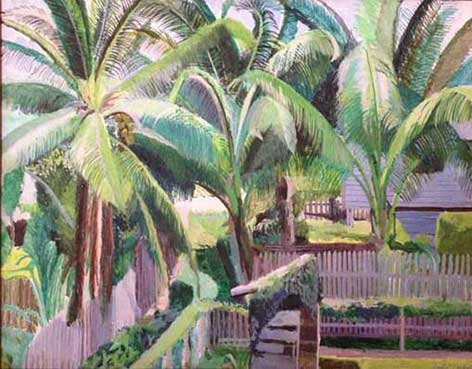
Public Road, Kitty, Georgetown, by Leila Locke c. 1973

Elfrieda Bissember (later Director of Castellani House, Guyana, Guyana's National Art Gallery) wrote of her paintings: "It is a record of a contemplative moment, complete in its details of unassuming but essential elements of any Guyanese life....There is a delicacy and unity of colour in the artist's handling of paint, and she has created a scene of great simplicity, warmth and directness...harmoniously designed in its unassuming details within this framed glimpse of a local backyard...thoughtful and limpid". From the mid 1970s she produced paintings that were a complete departure from her earlier work: non-representational, bright, abstract patterns and motifs, one of which was a strong recurring motif of a stylised Amerindian man with sun-ray markings around the head.

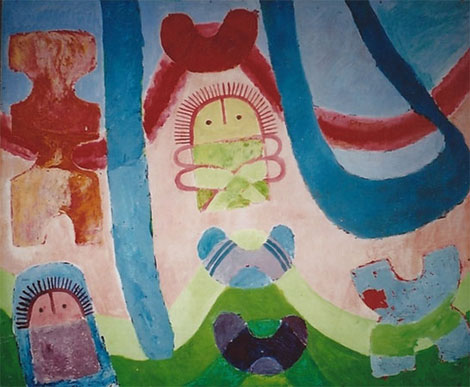
Timehri painting by Leila Locke 1973

In later years, commercial and studio ceramics became a more central part of her work. While living in chilly grey Edinburgh for four years she started making pottery models of Guyanese houses to remind her of the year she had spent, models she continued up until her death. Her major ceramic piece was a tiled swimming-pool, made entirely of locally sourced materials for the then President Forbes Burnham. She described –

The swimming pool was expected to be blue but I thought it should represent creek water, and so we made 2" by 2" mosaic tiles in shades from cream to yellow, blue, orange, green and brilliant scarlet. When the pool was filled the movement of the water turned the pool into an enormous op-art painting constantly moving and changing.

She wrote about an occasion in the 1970s, following her divorce:

I remember going on a picnic to Red Water Creek and while swimming in the creek looking at the sunlight shining through the water and making it from a translucent burnt sienna to a translucent yellow ochre, and the sparkling green water plants and water weed with tiny yellow flowers. If I went back to England I would not be able to see this light, this colour to inspire paintings. The landscape in England is so cultivated and there have been so many artists before me who have said all that can be said about that landscape. Whereas the Guyana landscape, the plants, have hardly been explored. I decided that I would stay.

== C.V. ==
1965 – Locke exhibited four works as part of The Guyana Week Art Exhibition at the National Museum, one of which, "Claudette Reading", won the Burnham Gold Medal and was her first to enter the National Collection.

1965 – Contributed illustrations to New World magazine.

1967 – Her first solo exhibition at The John F Kennedy Library, titled "Paintings 1966-1967".

1967 – Was part of group exhibition at the Chase Manhattan Bank.

1968 – Two person show with Judy Drayton at The John F Kennedy Library.

late 1960s – With Agnes Jones, curated international children's art exhibition at Bishops High School, Georgetown. Contained work from children of many countries and a section of work by naive artists.

1967–71 – Illustrated five children's reading books written by Beryl Gilroy, "The Green and Gold Readers", published by Longmans specifically for Guyana, showing local scenes and modelled on local children.

1971 – Illustrated "My Lovely Native Land: An Anthology of Guyana" by Elma and A. J. Seymour, with a cover by Aubrey Williams.

1972 - Exhibited in the official Carifesta Guyana '72 "International Art Exhibition".

1973 – Solo exhibition at The John F Kennedy Library.

1975–79 – Seconded to work with George Henry Associates on the production of locally produced glazed tiles for the swimming pool of President Forbes Burnham.

1976 - Exhibited in the Carifesta Jamaica '76 "Contemporary Art in Guyana" exhibition.

1984 – Became Production Manager at the WRSM (Women's Revolutionary Socialist Movement) owned Vanceram Tableware factory.

1985 – Received the AA (The Golden Arrow of Achievement) for her work in the arts.

1988 – Was featured artist in group exhibition "60 Years of Women Artists in Guyana" at Umana Yana, Georgetown.. Featured in "60 Years of Women Artists in Guyana: 1928-1988 - A Historical Perspective", published by The Guyana Women Artist's Association.

1989 – Was part of group exhibition "Themes and Variations" mounted at the National Museum in Barbados, sponsored by the Guyana/Barbados Association. This exhibition travelled to England in 1990 and was shown at the St.Albans Annual Caribbean Festival, the Commonwealth Institute London, and the Guyana High Commission London.

Early 1990s – Set up the Timehri Ceramics Studio.

2019 - featured artists in "A - Z of Caribbean Art", published by Robert & Christopher Publishers, Trinidad and Tobago. ISBN 978-976-95344-9-0

Locke produced public artworks such as a ceramic bust of Forbes Burnham in Kitty, Georgetown (circa 1986), four tiled panels at the Burial Place of President Burnham, and murals at the Critchlow Labour College and The Royal Bank of Baroda (1970).
