= Island Man =

Poem by Grace Nichols

"Island Man" is a poem by Guyana-born poet Grace Nichols. It is about a Caribbean emigrant who wakes up daily to the sound of crashing waves ("blue surf / in his head"), only to realise that what he hears is traffic on the North Circular Road in London ("to surge of wheels / to dull North Circular roar"). The poem pivots on the phrase "his small emerald island", symbolising both where he came from, as well as where he now lives in the rainy British Isles. The poem alternates long and short lines to suggest waves in the sea.
