= Evadne D'Oliveira =

Guyanese poet, playwright, journalist, and storyteller

Lillah Evadne D'Oliveira (5 October 1929 – 18 December 2010) was a Guyanese poet, playwright, journalist, and storyteller.

D'Oliveira was born in 1929 in New Amsterdam, grew up in Number 63 Village, and attended Berbice High School. In Guyana she worked as a columnist and editor of the Guyana Chronicle and founded a theatre group.

A versatile writer, she was known for presenting the same story in multiple forms: poem, play, short story, etc. She was a member of PEN International and of the Guyana Writers' Group.

Her successful play The Scattered Jewels (which she also published as a short story) was staged in Guyana's capital, Georgetown, and in Linden. She also wrote for radio: her 1968 short story, "Drama at Tukeit" was adapted as "The Choice" by the BBC, and she wrote stories especially for Voice of Guyana's "Broadcast to School" program. Her poems were widely included in anthologies, and she published two volumes of poetry, When Poet Sings and Ushering in the Millennium. In 2004, her stories were published in a volume titled The Scattered Jewels. She was also a recipient of the Guyana Prize for Literature.

She emigrated to Canada in 1979 and died in 2010.
