= Maggie Harris =

Guyanese poet, writer, and visual artist

- Education: University of Kent
- Occupations: Writer and visual artist
- Notable work: Limbolands; Sixty Years of Loving; "Sending for Chantal"
- Awards: Guyana Prize for Literature; Commonwealth Short Story Prize

Maggie Harris is a Guyanese poet, prose writer, and visual artist. She was awarded the Guyana Prize for Literature in 2000 and 2014 for her collections of poetry Limbolands and Sixty Years of Loving, respectively. She also received the Commonwealth Short Story Prize for the Caribbean region in 2014 for "Sending for Chantal".

== Early life and education ==
Harris is originally from Guyana and migrated to the United Kingdom in 1971. In 2006, she moved to Wales from Thanet, Kent, where she had lived since 1973. After ten years, she returned to Thanet.

Harris attended the University of Kent as a mature student where she received a BA degree in African and Caribbean studies and an MA in Post-Colonial Studies. She then taught creative writing in Broadstairs as part of the adult education offering at the University of Kent and was appointed an International Teaching Fellow at the University of Southampton.

== Career ==
Prior to becoming a writer, Harris was a visual artist; her practice began in school where she was taught by the Guyanese artist Stanley Greaves. She exhibited her work during the 1980s in libraries and galleries, including at the University of Kent and The Mall Galleries in London. The cover of her book 60 Years of Loving features her own artwork.

Since pivoting to literature, Harris has published six collections of poetry and three collections of short stories. She has also recorded poems for children (Anansi Meets Miss Muffet). Her work has appeared in publications such as The Lampeter Review, Wasafiri, The Caribbean Writer, and Poetry Wales. She has performed her work across the U.K. and in Barbados, and she has additionally represented Kent in Europe. In 2002, she founded the first live literature festival in Thanet, Inscribing the Island, and invited many Black British and Caribbean writers, including Valerie Bloom and Jackie Kay. In 2011, Kingston University Press published her memoir Kiskadee Girl, which centres on her childhood in the Caribbean.

Two of her poems have been commissioned for public art installations. "Dear Mr Dickens" appeared at The Catalpa Tree, Rochester Cathedral, as part of The Empty Chair Poetry Trail Celebrating Charles Dickens. As a competition winner, her poem "Canterbury" is on display in Canterbury's Westgate Gardens. In 2016, Harris was commissioned by the BBC to write her poem "Lit by Fire" about the North Foreland Lighthouse in Broadstairs for National Poetry Day. Her poetry has also been featured in a number of anthologies including Red: Contemporary Black British Poetry, published by Inscribe Print, Peepal Tree Press in 2010; and Out of Bounds: British Black and Asian Poets, published by Bloodaxe Books in 2012.

== Inspirations ==
Speaking on the themes of her work, she has said: "Generally speaking, as a writer from Guyana, themes of migration and loss, engagement with questions of 'home', history and landscape are intrinsic to my writing. The loss of homeland and 'roots' is a strong undercurrent, as is also the fact of being a woman. Journeying, settlement and motherhood are also essential themes as is the realization of being a creative person, which means that these themes are not necessarily negative ones, but a part of life."

Harris has named Leonard Cohen, Derek Walcott, Kamau Brathwaite, Lawrence Scott, Isabel Allende, Jean Toomer, Alice Walker, Toni Morrison, Pauline Melville, and Grace Nichols as literary influences.

== Awards and recognition ==
Harris won the Guyana Prize for Literature in 2000 for her first collection of poetry Limbolands; she won the prize again in 2014 for Sixty Years of Loving. Her collection After a Visit to a Botanical Garden was shortlisted for the prize in 2010. Additionally, she was awarded a grant by Arts Council England South East for her memoir Kiskadee Girl which won the Kingston University Life-Writing Competition in 2008. In 2014, she won the Commonwealth Short Story Prize for the Caribbean for her story Sending for Chantal.

In 2016, her collection In Margate by Lunchtime was longlisted for the Edge Hill Short Story Prize. The following year, she won third prize in the International Welsh Poetry Competition for her poem "On Watching a Lemon Sail the Sea". In 2020, she won first prize in the Wales Poetry Award for "and the thing is".

She has received the University of Kent T. S. Eliot Prize and the Kent Outstanding Learner award. She was awarded a Leverhulme Trust Research Abroad Scholarship to the University of the West Indies at Cave Hill.

== Bibliography ==
=== Poetry collections ===
- Limbolands (Mango Publishing, 1999, ISBN 1 902294 09 2)
- From Berbice to Broadstairs (Mango Publishing, 2006, ISBN 1 902294 28 9)
- After a Visit to a Botanical Garden (Cane Arrow Press, 2010, ISBN 978 0 9562901 1 3)
- Selected Poems 1999–2010 (Guyana Classics Library, 2011, ISBN 978 1 907493 34 8)
- Sixty Years of Loving (Cane Arrow Press, 2014, ISBN 978 0 9562901 7 5)
- On Watching a Lemon Sail the Sea (Cane Arrow Press, 2019, ISBN 978-0-9929388-3-3)

=== Short story collections ===
- Canterbury Tales on a Cockcrow Morning (Cultured Llama, 2012, ISBN 978 0 9568921 6 4)
- In Margate by Lunchtime (Cultured Llama, 2015, ISBN 978 0 9926485 3 4)
- Writing on Water (Seren Books, 2017, ISBN 978 1 7817237 0 8)

=== Memoir ===
- Kiskadee Girl (Kingston University Press, 2011, ISBN 978 1 899999 50 7)
