= Elly Niland =

Guyanese writer (born 1954)

Elly Niland (born 1954) is a Guyanese-born poet, playwright and teacher.

Her first collection of poetry was nominated for Best First Book of Poetry and was runner up for the Guyana Prize for Literature 2004. Her second collection Cornerstones won the Guyana Prize for Literature 2006. Her third collection, East of Centre, was funded by the British Arts Council and launched with several of the regions' leading writers at CARIFESTA 2008.

== Early life and education ==
Niland was born in Guyana on the Courantyne coast in 1954, and has lived in Surrey, England, with her husband and children since 1971. After studying as a mature student at Hillcroft College in Britain, she went on to read for her Modern Arts degree at Kingston University and then to take her Postgraduate Certificate in Education. She is the older sister of writer and broadcaster David Dabydeen.

== Collaborations ==
Elly Niland and David Dabydeen dramatised Harold Sonny Ladoo’s short novel No Pain Like This Body – depicting the terrifying world of a family brutalised by violence, poverty and nature itself. Set in a Hindu community in the Eastern Caribbean in 1905 during the August rainy season, it centres on a poor rice-growing family's struggle to survive. No Pain Like this Body was broadcast on BBC Radio 3 in 2003.

"The Fog", a story about a sickness spreading across Malaysia, was specially commissioned for the BBC's Commonwealth Stories season and was read by Liz Sutherland on BBC Radio 4 in 2005.

== Fiction ==
"Market Day", from her Bone Soup collection, was shortlisted for the inaugural Guardian and 4th Estate short story prize in 2016.

Niland is currently working on a collection of creole stories set in a fictional village in Guyana.

== Works ==
- Inretrospect (Aeneas Press, 2003, ISBN 978-1-902115-31-3)
- Cornerstones (Dido Press, 2005, ISBN 978-1-902115-47-4)
- East of Centre (Dido Press, 2008, ISBN 978-1-902115-63-4)

== Prizes ==
- Guyana Prize for Literature 2004 (runner up)
- Guyana Prize for Literature 2006 (winner)
