= Abdur Rahman Slade Hopkinson =

Abdhur Rahman Slade Hopkinson
- Born: 1934; New Amsterdam, Guyana
- Died: 1993 (aged 58–59)
- Occupation: Poet, writer, teacher
- Education: University College of the West Indies (BA, DipEd); Yale University (MFA)
- Genre: Poetry and short stories
- Children: 2, incl. Nalo Hopkinson

Abdhur Rahman Slade Hopkinson (né Slade Hopkinson; 1934 – 1993) was a Guyana-born poet, playwright, actor and teacher.

== Early life ==
Slade Hopkinson was born in the town New Amsterdam, Guyana; his father was a barrister, and his mother, a nurse. Slade's family moved to Barbados after his father's death. There, he enrolled in Harrison College. He was awarded a scholarship to the University College of the West Indies in 1952, where he took part in school theatre, and directed productions of Oedipus and King Lear. He secured a Bachelor of Arts in his first year – 1953 – and a Diploma of Education three years later.

== Career ==
Slade Hopkinson then went travelled to Jamaica, where he took various jobs in education, journalism, and the government. There, he was married and had two children, Nalo and Keita. In 1954, he published a poetry collection titled The Four and Other Poems. In 1957, he wrote a play, The Blood of a Family, and in 1962 his family moved to Trinidad where he joined the Trinidad Theatre Workshop. He left to study at the Yale Drama School for two years then accepted a teaching position at the University of Guyana for two years until 1968. During that time authored two more plays, published in 1967 and 1968. He later returned to the Theatre Workshop, but in 1970 he had a disagreement and left to found the Caribbean Theatre Guild the same year. Six years later, two more poetry volumes were published, one secular and the other religio-philosophical.

Hopkinson was also active in the "Anira" literary group, which operated out of the home of Martin Carter's mother and included Carter, Jan Carew, and others. He also dabbled in short fiction, while his poetry was picked up by journals, periodicals, and anthologies including, The Penguin Book of Caribbean Verse. A selection of his poems which had been written between 1952 and 1992 was titled Snowscape With Signature, and published in 1993. Mervyn Morris provided an introduction.

== Later life ==
Slade Hopkinson had converted to Islam in 1964, and changed his name. In 1970 he suffered from a kidney failure and was later forced to use frequent dialysis, which finished his career as an actor. He spent a few years working in Jamaica for a tourism board, before moving to Canada as a Vice-Consul for Guyana. He later took some jobs in education before accepting long-term disability leave. Diagnosed with kidney cancer, he died in 1993 just before the publication of Snowscape With Signature.

== Selected works ==
- The onliest fisherman: a medium-length play in 1-act. Kingston Extra-Mural Department of the University College of the West Indies, 1950.
- The four: and other poems. [Barbados]: [Advocate Co.], 1954.
- The madwoman of Papine: poems. Georgetown, Guyana: Ministry of Education and Social Development, 1976.
- 'Electric Eel Song'. In Stewart Brown, Mervyn Morris and Gordon Rohlehr, eds., Voiceprint: an anthology of oral and related poetry from the Caribbean, Harlow: Longman Caribbean, 1989.
- 'Marcus Aurelius and the Transatlantic Baakoo'. In Mervyn Morris, ed., The Faber Book of Contemporary Short Stories, London; Boston: Faber and Faber, 1990.
- Snowscape With Signature: Poems, 1952-1992. Leeds, England: Peepal Tree, 1993.
