= College of Science, Technology and Applied Arts of Trinidad and Tobago =

College in Trinidad and Tobago

Coordinates: 10.66182°N 61.51409°W

- Motto: Transformus Vitae (Latin)
- Motto in English: Gain Future Skills - Transforming Lives...One Student at a Time
- Type: Public community college
- Established: October 27, 2000
- President: Dr. Keith Nurse
- Location: Trinidad and Tobago
- Campus: * City Campus, North Learning Centre - NLC, South Campus, Tobago Campus, Chaguanas Campus
- Website: www.costaatt.edu.tt

The College of Science, Technology and Applied Arts of Trinidad and Tobago (COSTAATT) is a public, multi-campus college in Trinidad and Tobago, established in 2000.
