= Castellani House, Guyana =

Building in Guyana

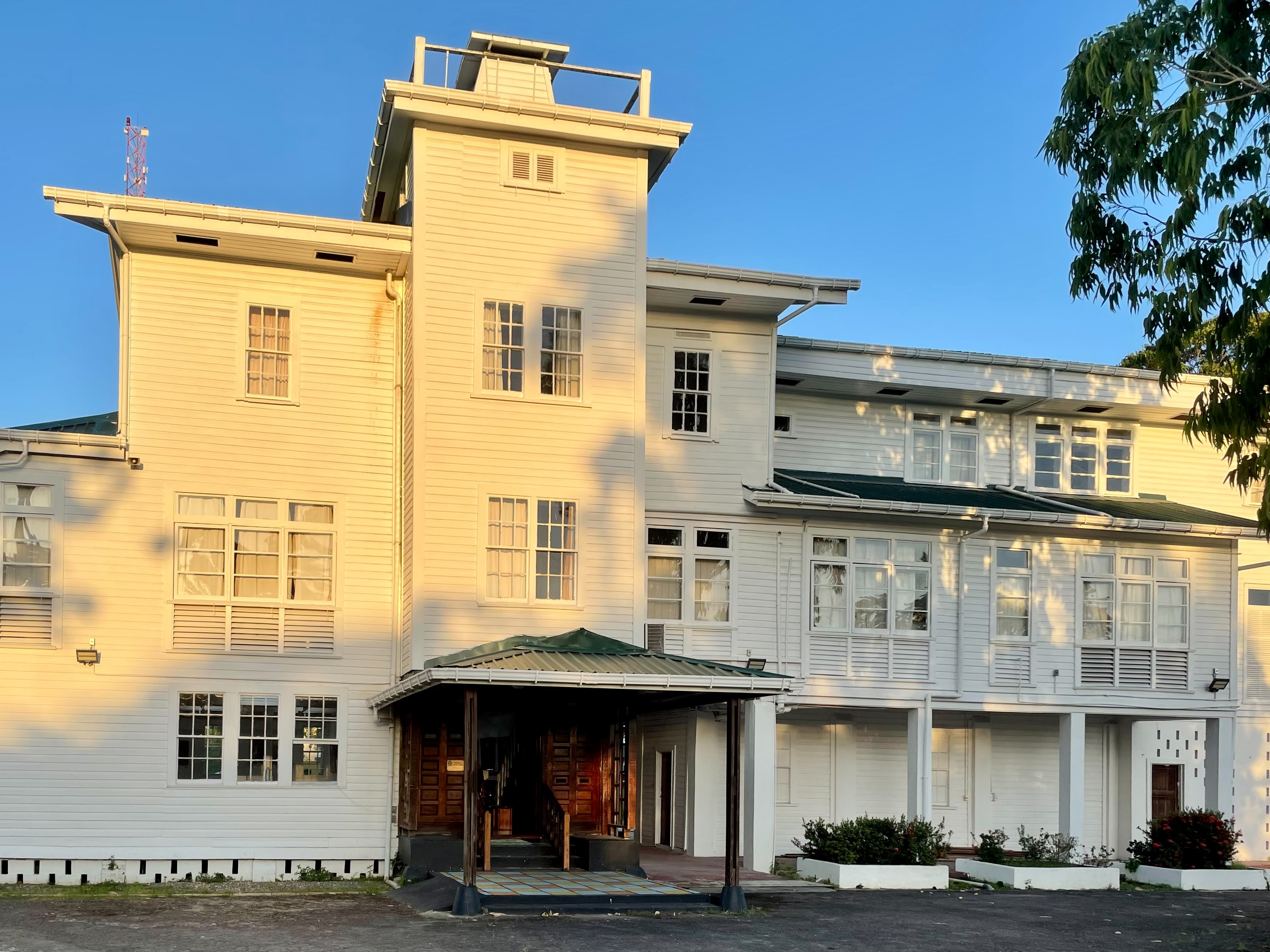
- Castellani House in 2023

- Location within Guyana

General information
- Location: Georgetown, Guyana
- Coordinates: 6°48′21″N 58°08′59″W
- Construction started: 1879

Castellani House is a large nineteenth-century building in Georgetown, Guyana. It is on the corner of Vlissengen Road and Homestretch Avenue (by the Botanical Gardens). It was designed and constructed by the Maltese architect, Cesar Castellani, between 1879 and 1882. Originally serving as a residence for colonial government officials, Castellani House has been the home of Guyana's National Art Gallery since 1993.

== History ==
Castellani House was designed and built in by Cesar Castellani, who was one of the most prominent and prolific architects of the colonial era in British Guiana. It was originally designed as a residence for the government botanist, George Samuel Jenman. Dissatisfied with the original design of the house, Jenman refused to move into the residence until the changes he demanded had been implemented. These changes were completed in 1882, and Jenman moved into the house in that year. After Jenman died, Castellani House was used as the official residence for Directors of Agriculture.

In 1942, the house was extended with the addition of a third storey to the original two. In 1965, further changes were made to the structure of the house by the Guyanese architect, Hugh McGregor Reid.

From 1965 to 1985, Castellani House was the official residence for Prime Minister Forbes Burnham and First Lady, Viola Burnham. During this time it was known simply as "the Residence". State House replaced it as the president's residence in the 1990s.

After a major refurbishment, Castellani House was re-opened as the home of the National Art Gallery in 1993. The Gallery's first curator was Everley Austin (1994–1996). Austin was followed by Elfrieda Bissember (1996–present).

== Art collection ==
Castellani House holds over 700 works of art. The collection includes work by Frank Bowling, E. R. Burrowes, Stanley Greaves, Bernadette Persaud, George Simon, Denis Williams and Aubrey Williams.
