= Narmala Shewcharan =

Guyanese-born novelist and anthropologist

Narmala Shewcharan is a Guyanese-born novelist and anthropologist who lives in the UK. She holds an MA and a PhD from Brunel University.

She also trained as a journalist at the University of Guyana. She was awarded a writing fellowship by the Ragdale Foundation in Chicago and commenced work during this residency on her novel, Tomorrow is Another Day.

Tomorrow is Another Day was published in 1994 and shortlisted in that year for the Guyana Prize for Literature. The book fictionalises some of her encounters and perceptions during the turbulent 1980s period of the Burnham presidency, focusing on ordinary people's entanglement in the politics of the times and their efforts to assert their agency.

She has written two other novels. She has also written a number of plays, including Janhjat: Bola Ram and the Long Story, which was adapted for television and shown on MBC Channel 93 in Guyana, On the Wings of a Woodant and Going Berbice.

She began writing poetry and short stories at an early age and was awarded a Guyfesta Prize for her poetry. Her poems and short stories were published extensively in the Guyana Chronicle in the 1980s.
