= N. D. Williams =

- Born: 1942 (age 83–84); Guyana
- Education: University of the West Indies

N. D. "Wyck" Williams (born 1942 in Guyana) is a New York-based writer.

== Biography ==
Born in Guyana, Williams went to Jamaica as a student to study at University of the West Indies at Mona in 1968. As a student he witnessed the riots following student demonstrations against the banning of the late Dr. Walter Rodney. This is now referred to as the Rodney riots, 1968.

In 1976 his first novel Ikael Torass was awarded the prestigious Casa de las Americas prize.

In 2002 Williams published his searching look at the teeming underclass of New York in his disturbing novel Ah, Mikhail, O Fidel.

Two other collection of short stories followed: Colonial Cream in January 2003 and The Friendship of Shoes (November 2005).

== Bibliography ==
- Ikael Torass, novel (1976)
- The Crying of Rainbirds, short stories (1992)
- The Silence of Islands, novel (1994)
- Prash and Ras (1997)
- Julie Mango, short stories (2003)
- Colonial Cream, short stories (2003)
- The Friendship of Shoes, short stories (2005)
