= Doris Rogers =

Guyanese artist (1929–2016)

- Born: November 21, 1929; Georgetown, British Guiana.
- Died: September 22, 2016 (aged 86)

Academic background
- Education: Howard University; Pennsylvania State University

Academic work
- Discipline: Fine arts
- Institutions: University of Guyana; University of Benin

Doris Elrina Rogers (née Vantull; 21 November 1929 – 22 September 2016) was a Guyanese academic who specialised in fine arts. She was a professor at the University of Guyana from 1988 to her retirement in 2008, and a professor emeritus thereafter.

== Early life ==
Rogers was born in Georgetown, British Guiana. She grew up in the small settlement of Rose Hall, in the country's east, but returned to Georgetown to attend Central High School. After completing her leaving certificate, Rogers began teaching at a Roman Catholic school in Port Mourant. Originally a science teacher, she developed an interest in art and in 1967 won a UNESCO scholarship to attend the South Australian School of Art (now part of the University of South Australia). When she returned to Guyana, she took up a position as an advisor to the national Ministry of Education, additionally teaching art at Bishops' High School.

== Academia ==
Rogers moved to the United States to further her education, spending several years in Washington, D.C., studying at Howard University. She graduated with a Bachelor of Fine Arts degree in 1974 and a Master of Arts degree in 1975, specialising in art education and painting. She completed her Ph.D. at Pennsylvania State University at the age of 51. Rogers subsequently moved to Benin City, Nigeria, to take up an associate professorship at the University of Benin. She spent seven years there, studying African art with a concentration on the traditional art of the Fulani people.

Returning to her homeland, Rogers became a professor at the University of Guyana in 1988. She was the coordinator of the Division of Creative Arts until 2003, and oversaw the introduction of the university's first fine arts degree in 1990. Rogers was interested in spreading and maintaining the knowledge of African art among the Afro-Guyanese population. She was the founder of Revival and Perpetuation of African Culture (RAPAC), an organisation devoting to protecting the intellectual property rights of practitioners of African cultural traditions. Rogers was also inspired by Indo-Guyanese practices, and once led a study tour of India alongside Bernadette Persaud. Her own artwork was exhibited in Guyana, North America, Nigeria, and India.

== Later life and honours ==
Rogers retired from the University of Guyana in 2008 and was made a professor emeritus. In 2015, she was awarded the Golden Arrow of Achievement by the Guyanese government. Rogers died in September 2016, aged 86, having suffered from dementia for several years. President David A. Granger issued a condolence statement describing her as "a distinguished national expert in the field of art education and the performing arts".
