= Ryhaan Shah =

Ryhaan Shah is an Indo-Guyanese writer born in Berbice, Guyana. She is the President of the Guyanese Indian Heritage Association (GIHA).

In November 2009, Shah was chosen one of The 500 Most Influential Muslims as a novelist, despite criticism for race baiting in Guyana's 2015 election.

The GIHA aims to promote Indo-Guyanese culture. The organization competes with the Indian Arrival Committee, which is aligned with the People's Progressive Party. GIHA seeks to maintain a distinct Indian identity, and is against assimilation or creolization into the greater Afro-Guyanese community. She has described Guyana as a stop-over point for Indians, seeking better, safer places abroad.

Shah lived outside of Guyana from 1976 to 1997 in the US, Britain and Grand Cayman.

== Books ==
Shah's first novel, A Silent Life (Peepal Tree, 2005), won the 2007 Guyana Prize for Literature First Book Award.

Her second novel, Weaving Water, (Cutting Edge Press, 2013), deals with Guyanese history in a comparable way, but from a Hindu point of view and with a more chronological treatment.

She is also a columnist for the Guyana Times.
