= Ruel Johnson =

Guyanese writer

Ruel Johnson is a Guyanese author.

Johnson won the 2002 Guyana Prize for Literature for best first fiction manuscript for a collection of short stories entitled Ariadne and Other Stories, which he self-published the following year with assistance from COURTS and GuyEnterprise. Johnson, then 22, was the youngest person ever to win the prize.

He also won the 2012 Guyana Prize for Literature for submitting the best book of fiction.

In 2016 he participated in the International Writing Program's Fall Residency at the University of Iowa, in Iowa City, IA, and was the first Guyanese to participate in the programme. He is the Cultural Policy Advisor through the Ministry of Education, and since 2014 has been working to establish a national cultural policy.

A former President's College (Golden Grove, Demerara-Mahaica, Guyana, South America) student who hails from Tucville Terrace, Greater Georgetown, Johnson is the eldest of five and has one child.

Ruel Johnson was recently accused of physical abuse by an ex-girlfriend by the name of Akola Thompson. She alleged that he manipulated her and took advantage of her during times of vulnerability by being physical, emotionally and sexually abusive to her.
