= Edwina Melville =

Guyanese writer and activist (1926–1993)

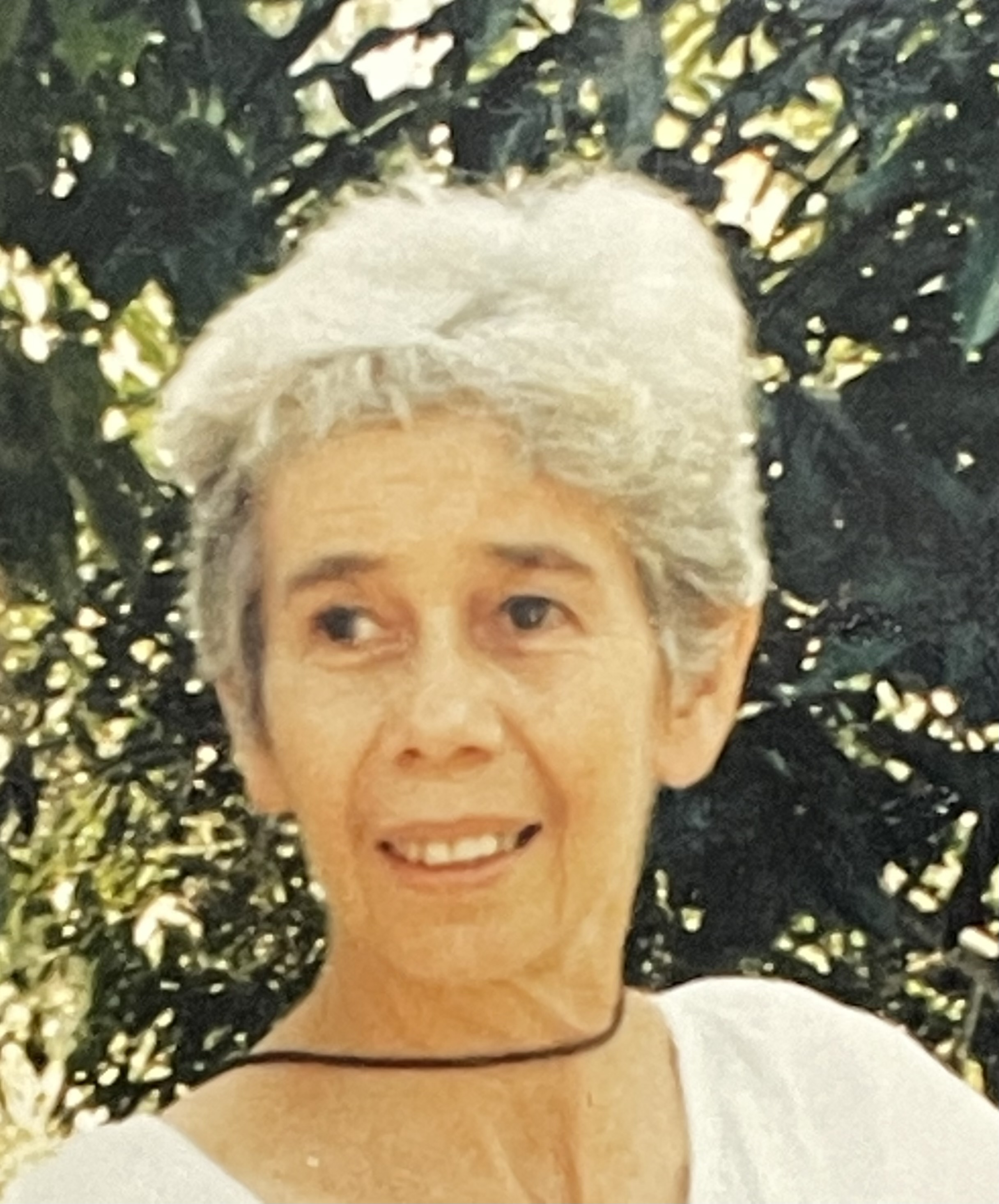
- Born: 1926; Mahaicony, Guyana
- Died: 1993 (aged 66–67); Guyana
- Occupations: Writer and politician

Edwina Melville (1926–1993) was a Guyanese writer, teacher, politician and advocate of the first-nation Wapishana peoples of the Southern Rupununi, Guyana.

== Early life ==
Edwina Gordon was born at Spooner Plantation in Mahaicony. She grew up in Georgetown and was educated at Bishop's High School. Her first connection to the Rupununi savannah came when visiting her brother, who was working for the Rupununi Development Company based at the Wariwau Outstation. Melville then settled in Lethem, in Rupununi, after her marriage to Charles Melville in 1950 and had five children: twins Charles and Tondeley, followed by Edward, Don and Wayne.

Melville was employed as a schoolteacher, shop-holder and as a confidential secretary to the District Commissioner of Lethem. Her dedication to representing the peoples of the Rupununi later took political form when she was elected to parliament in 1985 for the People's National Congress representing District 9.

== Works ==
Melville's stories and accounts of living in the Rupununi were published in the important West Indian little magazine Kyk-Over-Al edited by A. J. Seymour out of Guyana. Four of Melville's short stories, rendering life in the hinterland, were sent to Henry Swanzy in London from where they were subsequently broadcast to the West Indies on the BBC's Caribbean Voices radio programme between 1953 and 1955. Three of her stories submitted to Blackwood's Magazine in Edinburgh were also published in the mid-century: "The Waiting Land" in 1955, "Waphishana Village" in 1957 and "The Girl in Green", which was awarded second prize in the Blackwood Prize Competition of 1964, in 1965.

Melville's piece on "The Wapishana Indians" was anthologised in My Lovely Native Land An Anthology of Guyana in 1971, and a number of her poems were included in A. J. Seymour's A Treasury of Guianese Poetry (1980).

In keeping with other Anglophone Caribbean women writers of the mid-century who did not migrate and whose work was not published by metropolitan publishing houses, Melville's writings remain almost unknown.

Melville's illustrated book This is the Rupununi: A Simple Story Book of the Savannah Lands of the Rupununi District, British Guiana, was published by the Guyana Information Service in 1956. In Michael Swan's 1958 travelogue, The Marches of El Dorado, Swan recounts his meeting with Edwina, then in her twenties, and the views she shared, "She was strongly against the civilising of the Indians, feeling that their happiness lay in the preservation of their tribal ways and traditions." Petamber Persaud makes reference to Melville's work collecting anthropological and ethno-botanical material relating to Amerindian myths and legends, much of which was lost during the Rupununi Uprising of 1969.
