= Marc Matthews =

Guyanese writer (born 1940s)

- Born: 1940s British Guiana
- Other name: Tramping Man
- Education: Queen's College
- Occupations: Writer, actor, broadcaster and producer
- Notable work: Guyana My Altar
- Awards: Guyana Prize for Literature (1987)

Marc Matthews (born 1940s) is a Guyanese writer, actor, broadcaster and producer.

== Biography ==
Marc Matthews was born in British Guiana in the 1940s.

He was a co-director/founder of Jaiai Independent Broadcasting Unit, and with Peter Kempadoo produced Our Kind Of Folk for radio in Guyana.

In the 1960s, Matthews was in London, England, as a freelance reporter.

In 1987, Matthews won the Guyana Prize ,Guyana My Altar (Karnak House, 1987). His collection A Season of Sometimes was published by Peepal Tree Press in 1992. His work has also been anthologized in collections such as The Heinemann Book of Caribbean Poetry (1992) and The Penguin Book of Caribbean Verse in English.

Around 2005, Matthews, working under the pseudonym "Tramping Man", formed a musical collaboration named Burn Brothers with two London-based producers, Jean Philippe Altier and Adam Hoyle. They were joined by saxophonist Florian Brand and performed a number of gigs in and around London in 2007. A record entitled Fire Exit was recorded and released in April 2008.

== Selected bibliography ==
- Eleven O'Clock Goods, Kairi, 1974.
- Guyana My Altar (poetry), Karnak House, 1987.
- A Season of Sometimes, Peepal Tree Press, 1992
