= Maya Tiwari =

Guyanaian author and peace leader

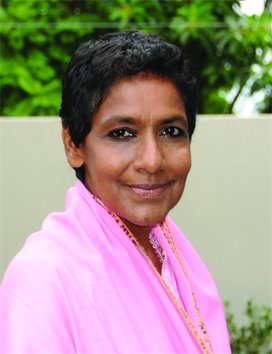
Tiwari in 2012

Maya Tiwari (born April 16, 1952, in Liverpool Village, Guyana) is a humanitarian, world peace leader and author. Also called "Mother Maya", she is an international teacher of Ayurveda, a health activist and the founder of the Wise Earth School of Ayurveda and Mother Om Mission.

== Biography ==
Maya Tiwari was born in Guyana, the daughter of Brahmin priest Pandit Bhagawan Ramprasad Tiwari, whose family originated from Lucknow, India. Thereafter, she became a fashion designer in New York City at the age of 18. Her fashion and "Maya" boutique was a prominent store at 773 Madison Avenue, New York City where she served clientele like Jackie Onassis, Princess Diana, Rudolph Nureyev, and Patti La Belle among other celebrities. Her designs were featured in stores such as Bergdorf Goodman, Henri Bendel's, and Saks Fifth Avenue to Harrods in the UK.

In 1981, Tiwari established the Wise Earth School of Ayurveda, the first school for Ayurveda studies in North America, based on the knowledge of the Greater Vedas.

On Mother's Day in 1998, Tiwari founded the Mother Om Mission (MOM), a nonprofit organization that provides Ayurveda education and services to at-risk communities in New York's inner cities and Guyana.

In December 2009, Tiwari was a featured speaker at the Parliament of the World's Religions in Melbourne, Australia.

In 2010, Tiwari renounced her monastic title and spiritual honorific—Her Holiness, Sri Swami Mayatitananda—to, as she puts it, "walk a simpler and more accessible life in service of the populations in need".

In October 2016, Tiwari was the opening guest on the radio show 'Unlock Your Health', where in she recorded a series of four interviews on her cancer healing journey.

== The Peace Mandala ==
Among the healing programs developed by Tiwari is The Peace Mandala, a program in which she leads hundreds of people worldwide in the creation of Peace Mandalas created from seeds and grains "to help generate inner harmony by reconnecting to nature's seed memory of wellness and love." The purpose of The Peace Mandalas is "to re-enliven humanity's memory of inner harmony and the awareness necessary to cooperate with and celebrate Mother Earth's profound gifts to humanity. Living Ahimsa brings awareness to the preservation of the seed-memory of nature, human sentiency and the integrity of Mother Earth." More than 1 million participants in 7 countries have since taken the Vow of Ahimsa while creating the Peace Mandala. From 2009-2022, Tiwari has presented the Peace Mandala 4 times at the Parliament of the World's Religions. She appeared at Deepak Chopra's "Seduction of Spirit" meditation event in Toronto, Canada in August 2014 where she led the attendees through the creation of making a Peace Mandala.

== The Living Ahimsa World Peace Tour and Oath ==
In December 2009, at the Parliament of the World's Religions in Melbourne, Australia, Tiwari began The Living Ahimsa World Peace Tour and has traveled to several countries, leading people in taking an oath of ahimsa, which means non-harm or peace. (Mahatma Gandhi is a key world figure who promoted ahimsa as a vehicle for creating change.) The Living Ahimsa Peace Tour's aim is "teaching the cultivation of harmony and nonviolence in thought, speech, and action, with the purpose of healing individuals and safeguarding Mother Earth and the world." Tiwari states, 'The world can't engender peace until we as individuals . . . discover the state of inner harmony within us.' As of September 2022, Tiwari has been on The Living Ahimsa World Peace Tour for 13 years. 1,774,112 people have taken the oath. Hinduism Today writes, "The Living Ahimsa Vrata mission makes the spirit of nonviolence a palpable reality for individuals [...] The vow can be taken in person or online. Central to the vow is a thirty-minute meditation twice a day. Aum is chanted 108 times, two times, followed by contemplation on key Hindu Vedic verses."

Tiwari's Inner Medicine Healing principle informs the curricula of Wise Earth Ayurveda education. Tiwari says that "Inner Medicine Healing is based on the concept that each one of us has the ability to heal ourselves." A key part of her teachings is The Cosmic Memory Principle, which refers to achieving healing through the collective timeless memories of all species and life forms in the universe.

== Recognition ==
- Tiwari received the Dhanvantari International Award in 2011 for work in Ayurveda education.
- Tiwari is the recipient of AAPNA’s Rishi Award for outstanding work in Ayurveda.
- Tiwari was given the distinction of "World Peace Leader" by the Parliament of the World’s Religions, 2009.
- Tiwari's book The Path of Practice was nominated for a Nautilus Award.

== Books and recordings ==
- Ayurveda: A Life of Balance (Healing Arts Press, 1994 ISBN 978-0-89281-490-9)
- Ayurveda: Secrets of Healing (Lotus Press, 1995 ISBN 978-0-914955-15-3)
- The Path of Practice: A Woman's Book of Healing with Food, Breath, and Sound (Ballantine Books, 2000 (1st Ed.) ISBN 978-0-345-43030-4)
- Darshana: Vedic Chanting for Daily Practice (Mother Om Sounds, 2004 ASIN B000MTLZDA)
- Women's Power to Heal: through Inner Medicine (Mother Om Media, 2007 ISBN 978-0-9793279-0-2)
- Living Ahimsa Diet: Nourishing Love & Life (Mother Om Media, 2012 ISBN 978-0979327926)
- Love! A Daily Oracle for Healing (Lotus Press, 2012 ISBN 978-0979327933)
