= Theresa Chromati =

American painter (born 1992)

- Born: 1992 (age 33–34)
- Education: Delaware College of Art and Design; Pratt Institute (BFA, 2014)
- Occupation: Visual artist

Theresa Chromati (born 1992) is an American visual artist of Guyanese descent, whose primary medias are painting and collage. She is from Baltimore, Maryland, and lives in Brooklyn, New York.

== Background and career ==
Theresa Chromati, who was born in 1992, grew up in East Baltimore. She attended Wilmington's Delaware College of Art and Design, and holds a bachelor of fine arts degree in graphic design from Pratt Institute (2014), New York, where she currently lives. Her parents nurtured a creative environment at home, and hand-painted birds in the family car themselves.

=== Artistic practice ===
Through an abstract figurative approach to painting and collage, Chromati comments on Black femininity and womanhood as key subjects for her artistry. In her work she combines using acrylic paint with industrial materials such as glitter and vinyl, in addition to organic materials such as silk, cotton and bandanas that evoke Western African textiles and patterns. Among her themes, her artworks elaborate on issues of self-representation, and female objectification in the digital world, particularly in the Me Too era. Chromati was selected by visual artist Mickalene Thomas for her curatorial project Mickalene Thomas: A Moment's Pleasure, at the Baltimore Museum of Art, the exhibition was on view between 2019 and 2022.

Her work has been featured in Vogue magazine, Architectural Digest, and the New York Times Magazine.

=== Critical reception ===
In an essay for the Studio Museum in Harlem's magazine, art critic Eric Booker comments on Chromati's practice.

"Through her genre-bending practice, Chromati's protagonists refuse to be one-dimensional. Their potential is too vibrant to be traditionally understood. Her work is an act of love and defiance."

== Exhibitions ==
=== Solo shows ===
- 2023 Theresa Chromati: A Living Record ( Her Arrival Was Once Steps Taken), Jessica Silverman Gallery, San Francisco
- 2022 Interlude in Crusted Wounds, Veta Galeria, Madrid, Spain
- 2020 Stepping Out To Step In, The Delaware Contemporary, Wilmington
- 2019 Running in Place and Sometimes Walking: At Times I Feel Loved and Paralyzed, Kravets Wehby Gallery, New York, NY

== Collections ==
Chromati's work has been incorporated in notable museum and academic collections around the Americas such as

- The bull is out and my foot is in my mouth (are we staying or leaving)?, 2019. Pérez Art Museum Miami, Florida
- tearing me apart, so much so that I become beautiful ( woman exploring a smile ), 2019. Nasher Museum of Art at Duke University, North Carolina
- Stepping Towards My Darkest Bits to Hear a Familiar Song. The Words Have Changed, But the Melody Caresses Me All the Same (Woman Led by Her Intuition, Supported by Scrotum Flowers), 2020. Baltimore Museum of Art, Maryland

== Awards ==
In 2020, Chromati was commissioned to paint the facade of The Delaware Contemporary in commemoration of the 100th anniversary of the women's suffrage in America. Although scheduled for June 5 of that year, the public art project had its opening celebrated with a public "drive-thru" on June 19 in support of the Black Lives Matter movement, and anti-police brutality protests taking place all over the country in the summer months of 2020.
