= Meiling Jin =

- Born: 1963 (age 62–63); St. Cuthbert's Mission, Guyana
- Occupations: Author, radio broadcaster, playwright, and filmmaker
- Years active: 1985–present
- Notable work: Gifts From my Grandmother (1985); The Thieving Summer (1993; Song of the Boatwoman (1996)

Meiling Jin who was born 1963 is a Guyanese author, radio broadcaster, playwright, and filmmaker who currently lives in London, England.

== Early history ==
In 1963, Meiling Jin was born in Guyana to parents of Chinese ancestry. She has one sibling, a twin sister. Despite her parents' background, Jin did not visit China for the first time until 1981. For the first eight years of her life, she lived and was raised in Guyana. In June 1964, Jin's family fled the country due to the unstable politics and moved to London, England. Jin's family left Guyana two years before it achieved independence within the Commonwealth on 26 May 1966. Her father had travelled first, and the rest of her family followed. It was in London that Jin found her love for literature.

== Career ==
Meiling Jin writes of the initial distress in England that she and her sister faced as the only Chinese girls in their school. She details her own perspective of exile, “otherness” and the issues experienced as a minority group in England. As the only female Chinese students, Jin and her sister were persecuted on racist grounds by boys. The most important teacher for her, who taught arithmetic, was an Asian man. Jin learned a lot from her teachers in London during this time and mentions in numerous articles how they were some of the many people in her everyday life from which she drew inspiration for her works. Although surrounded by people, she led "a solitary and unsupervised life."

Today, Meiling Jin's topics and style of writing reflect her identity as a Chinese Caribbean author. However, it was not until around 2012 that she began identifying and marketing her work as a Chinese Caribbean author. Prior to that she simply referred to herself as a Caribbean author. Jin draws inspiration for her works from a range of different sources including Maya Angelou and Alice Walker. Jin also incorporates her many different cultural experiences in her work. She reasons why she writes and how poetry is remembered by so many by the iconic poets of the past several centuries. She expressed, "For me, writing is healing. It is also communicating. But above all, it's powerful. When I think of the mass media and the mausoleum of dead white poets, who have such a hold on people, I feel diminished. It's if, I am hurling myself against an enormous concrete wall; the only dent being my head the mausoleum of dead white poets, who have such a hold on people, I feel diminished."

Among these, Jin feels a great sense of pride in her work. She believes that her work, inspired by many female writers in China, is a way for her to get ideas across and to reach others in a personal way. She says one of the main reasons she continues to write "is the thought that someone might read it and be able to find something in it to connect with." This sense of purpose and meaning she feels for her work shows through the finished product. The reader will find a sense of deeper meaning in her work and hopefully be able to connect in the way Jin has with the works that have inspired her.

== Works ==
=== Gifts From my Grandmother ===
Gifts From My Grandmother (1985) is a collection of poems that explores the themes of "alterity, heritage, and sexual orientation". Meiling Jin infuses her life into the story by placing an introduction of the poems explaining how her parents chose England as opposed to Barbados for their final destination. The collection of poems is one of the first collections of its kind to give a voice to lesbian women. An example of this is when she says: "My lover's sheets are green,/ A soft soothing colour,/ And when she holds me,/ I feel safe enough to sleep." This collection of poems represents Meiling Jin's feelings of being an outcast and oftentimes being an immigrant with little or no voice. Examples of this can be seen in "Divide and Sub-Divide," which is a poem within the collection.

=== The Thieving Summer ===
According to Critical Perspectives on Indo-Caribbean Women's Literature, Meiling Jin uses The Thieving Summer (1993) to "make[s] plain the difficulties and dangers of growing up an outsider in an insular community". Waterstones Marketplace provides a brief summary of The Thieving Summer when they state: "A group of black children who live in North Kensington inadvertently find themselves involved with a petty criminal. The thief has a hold over one of them and blackmails them into keeping quiet – and even helping him in his burglaries. But the children are determined not to give up so easily." Not unlike the themes of her other pieces of work, Meiling Jin writes for older children, but does not shy away from addressing racial issues directly in this piece of literature.

=== Song of the Boatwoman ===
Song of the Boatwoman, published in November 1996, is a collection of short stories. These short stories have a variety of scenes including: "London, China, California, Malaysia [and] the Caribbean". Jin draws upon her Guyanese-Chinese roots as inspiration for a number of the poems in this compilation. She uses various unique writing techniques and styles to thoroughly entertain her readers. Furthermore, each of these stories, whether regarding gender, sexual orientation, or race, manifest into the overall representation of the Boatwoman.

Jin has dedicated Song of the Boatwoman to her mother, Stella Kam. In the beginning pages of this book Jin acknowledges and commends her mother for contributing to some of the stories told within Song of the Boatwoman. Song of the Boatwoman was published just seven months after her mother's death.

== Bibliography ==
- Gifts From my Grandmother (poetry), Sheba Feminist Press, 1985
- The Thieving Summer (children's story), Hamish Hamilton, 1993
- Song of the Boatwoman (stories), Peepal Tree Press, 1996
