= Laxmi Kallicharan =

Guyanese writer

Latchmie Kumarie Vainmati Kallicharran (5 June 1951 – 20 January 2002) was a Guyanese writer. From the 1970s onwards, she presented cultural programmes such as Lalla-Rookh, organized dance and music shows, working to incorporate Chutney music into Mashramani, and organized a photo exhibit about Indo-Guyanese history.

Kallicharan grew up in Berbice, Guyana and attended the Berbice Educational Institute before attending University of Guyana, where she also worked as a librarian. She died in a fire in early 2002.

She was posthumously awarded IAC honors by the Indian Action Committee.

== Works ==
- 1986 Shraadanjali anthology of Indo-Guyanese poetry
- 1996 They Came in Ships: An Anthology of Indo-Guyanese Prose and Poetry Lloyd Searwar, Joel Benjamin, Ian McDonald, Lakshmi Kallicharan
