= Yolanda T. Marshall =

Canadian author of children's books

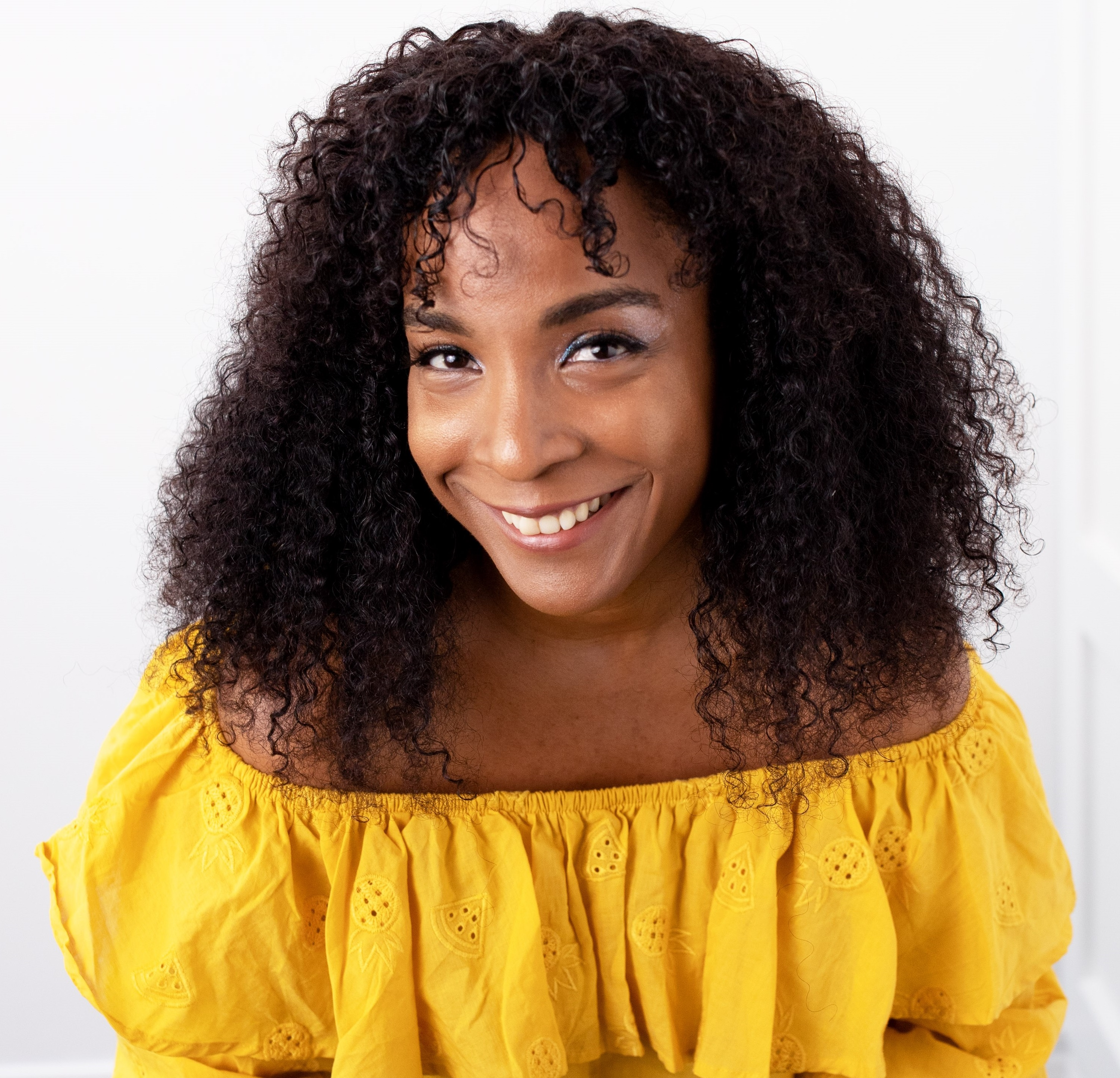
Marshall in 2021

Yolanda T. Marshall is a Canadian author of children's books, often with a Caribbean theme.

== Early life ==
Marshall, the oldest of three sisters, was born in Guyana and grew up in Scarborough, Toronto. Her family moved to Canada when she was 14. Her mother was already in Canada, working and saving to buy a home. Her father is a jazz musician.

== Writing ==
Marshall's first children's book, Keman’s First Carnival, was published in 2016. Her children's books generally center around children partaking in elements of Caribbean culture, such as food and music. She has written more than 20 children's books, including:

- A Piece of Black Cake for Santa (2017), where children give Santa sorrel and black cake.
- My Soca Birthday Party (2020), where a girl has a birthday party with Caribbean and African food and music; CBC.ca called it one of "the best Canadian picture books of 2020."
- C is for Carnival (2021), an A to Z book about children at the Toronto Caribbean Carnival.
- Hot Cross Buns For Everyone (2022), about children baking hot cross buns and having an Easter party.
- Brown Girl in the Snow (2025), inspired by a traditional Caribbean folk song, about an immigrant child's determination to grow her favourite plant and adapt into her new snowy home. It was included in lists of the best children's books of 2025 by CBC.ca and The Globe and Mail.

She has also written two books of poetry, Obayifo (2008) and Messages on Dried Leaves (2017).

== Personal life ==
As of 2020, Marshall lives in Scarborough, Toronto. She has a son, who inspired several of her books. As of 2020, she works in academic publishing.
