= Jan Shinebourne =

Guyanese novelist (born 1947)

Jan Lowe Shinebourne
- Born: 1947 (age 78–79); Berbice, Guyana
- Other name: Janice Shinebourne
- Education: University of Guyana (Bachelor of Arts); University of London (Master of Arts)
- Occupations: Novelist, reporter, civil rights activist
- Notable work: Timepiece

Jan Lowe Shinebourne (born 1947), also published as Janice Shinebourne, is a Guyanese novelist who now lives in England. In a position to be able to provide an insight into multicultural Caribbean culture, Shinebourne's is a voice : She grew up on a colonial sugar plantation and was affected by the dramatic changes her country went through in its transition from a colony to independence. She wrote her early novels to record this experience.

== Background ==
Born in Canje, a plantation village within Berbice, Guyana, Shinebourne was educated at Berbice High School and started a BA degree at the University of Guyana but did not complete it there. In 1970, she married John Shinebourne and moved to London where she completed her degree and a Postgraduate Certificate in Education, then taught in several London colleges, then did an MA in English at the University of London and became involved in civil rights politics. In 2006, she moved from London to Sussex where she now lives.

While living there, Shinebourne did her postgraduate literary studies at the University of London and obtained her Bachelor of Arts in English. Moreover, she then began lecturing at colleges and universities and also became the co-editor of Southhall Review. She began writing in the mid-1960s, and in 1974 was a prize-winner in the National History and Arts Council Literary Competition. While living in England she developed a friendship with writer and publisher John La Rose, who introduced her to many people that would have an influence of her career. After living in London for 40 years, she made the move to Sussex, which is where she currently lives. Her works have been praised by Anne Jordan and Chris Searle for her literary value and political engagement.

== Literary influence ==
Shinebourne is the author of novels, short stories, and essays. The major concern of her novels is to capture the colonial and postcolonial experience of the country of her birth, Guyana, so as to understand its problems and difficulties. Shinebourne has a rare voice in her writing style that distinguishes her from other authors.

== Works ==
=== Novels ===
In her first four books, Shinebourne has written about the place where she was born and spent her childhood – Rose Hall sugar estate in Berbice, Guyana. She was born there on 23 June 1947, the second of six children of her parents, Charles and Marion Lowe, when Guyana was not yet independent and still very much a British colony under the rule of the British government. She describes her early experiences at Rose Hall as extremely colonial. The estate was run along strict colonial lines whereby people were assigned their social status in terms of a pyramid structure of race and class. At the top were the minority white expatriates who ran the estate, they lived in exclusive quarters with all the facilities of running water, electricity, and modern conveniences in their luxurious homes, while at the bottom of the pyramid were the majority, i.e., the other races, including Africans and Indians who lived in squalid conditions, in inadequate housing without running water, electricity, and the amenities of modern life enjoyed by the expats. Shinebourne's own family were not estate workers, her father ran a grocery but growing up on the estate, she witnessed first-hand the injustices and suffering of the workers which led her to write about the effects of colonialism in Guyana which she describes as a central theme in her early writing, especially her first three novels, Timepiece, The Last English Plantation, and Chinese Women. These novels portray colonial British Guiana as a formative influence.

It has been wrongly stated that her writing focuses on the Chinese but this is not true. She is not interested in focusing on any one ethnic group in Guyana. She has been mainly focused on capturing the environment that shaped her from her early years in colonial British Guiana through to the postcolonial period of Independence when the country was renamed Guyana. In her youth. these were periods of intense and dramatic change that were recorded in the daily newspapers which she read avidly in her youth. She has said that change was happening so fast, she used to feel the country and its people were swept up in a storm of events and rapid change, and to her, it felt confusing, frightening, it was all so dramatic, it had to come out in her writing which she began to do in her early teenage years. In her first two novels, people are living through those times, in them she was trying to capture the environment that shaped her and shaped Guyana. She wanted to show how these changes impacted on people and their relationships in Guyana. She says she gets very irritated when people say she is a Chinese writer who is mainly interested in writing about only one ethnic group in Guyana, the Chinese people. She insists she is concerned about Guyana as whole, in what it has been in the past and where it is going in the future.

Her first novel, Timepiece, was a first step in this direction, in exploring this theme. She started working on it when she was 19 and left Rose Hall estate to work in the capital, Georgetown,.She says it was a difficult experience for her. She worked in a bank and at month end would return to Rose Hall to give her parents a financial contribution to help pay for the school fees of her younger siblings, something she was proud of doing, that made her feel good about herself, that she was becoming a responsible adult, but she found Georgetown a difficult place because there, you were judged by your class status which was tied up with race. In Timepiece, she writes about a young woman, Sandra Yansen, who has grown up in a rural village where she felt rooted in her rural community which she loves. When she leaves school, she moves to the capital Georgetown. In Georgetown, she feels uprooted and adrift because she has no friends and family there. She does not like the cynicism in people she meets. They have no sense of community, they are not strongly connected to each other like the people in her village, their relationships are casual and shallow. She cannot root herself in Georgetown. She meets a young man she likes who tells her that Georgetown is dominated by class, his father has suffered because of it. They try but fail to make a strong connection to each other and when he visits her village, he realises they are not compatible. It is a period when people are beginning to emigrate, to escape the political, social and economic instability that is a consequence of the political upheavals the country has been through, which are only hinted at in the novel. All the young people she has met in Georgetown are emigrating but the end of the novel indicates she has no plans to leave, it ends with her strong sense of the unchanging strengths of the rural community she is from. Timepiece is influenced by the politics of the independence struggle and the struggles of the People's Progressive Party, led by an Indian, Cheddi Jagan, who wanted to end British colonial rule and liberate the workers of the sugar estate. His party became split by two racial factions and the country descended into a racial war that destabilised it politically, economically and socially, leading people to escape the country, and so began the exodus that would escalate in the 1970s, and the movement of Guyanese towards North America.

In her second novel, The Last English Plantation, Shinebourne sets her story in 1956 when the political fractures of the 1960s began to show. This time, she chooses a much younger female protagonist, a 12-year-old, June Lehall, as she prepares to venture out of her rural community to go to an urban secondary school. Like Sandra Yansen in Timepiece, she also experiences the culture shock of confronting the intense race and class conflicts that colonialism bred in the country. We see June enter school and getting swept up in the race and class conflicts between her classmates. She has to learn to fight her own battles and struggles to survive. In Timepiece, Sandra does not go through anything like this in Georgetown where these conflicts exist more under the surface.

Shinebourne's third novel, Chinese Women, deals more even more openly with the race and class conflict created by colonialism which the narrator, Albert Aziz, a young Muslim Indian, has had to fight against all his life from when he grew up, the son of an Indian overseer, living in the exclusive living quarters among the white expatriates. He describes how racial segregation and prejudice was maintained by the expatriate overseers to keep non-whites in their place on the sugar estate. It was a form of apartheid that he feels caused all his suffering. So racialised was this system, he has internalised it so deeply he can only see people in racial terms of superiority and inferiority. He falls in love with two Chinese women who he idealises in terms of their race. He believes that Chinese people are better by virtue of being Chinese especially the Chinese girl he meets at school, Alice Wong. He falls in love with her and long after they leave school and he has emigrated to Canada, he continues to carry a torch for her and at the age of 60, he tracks her down to England to propose to her, but she rejects him. The colonial system of a kind of racial apartheid in British Guiana was so extreme and had such a profound impact on the young Muslim, he can only see people's worth and his in terms of race and in the end, living in a post 9/11 world, he identifies with the Muslim cause and finally turns against the developed First World which he views as the creation of the imperialism and colonialism that cursed his early life growing up on a colonial sugar estate in British Guiana. For Shinebourne, Albert Aziz stands for what happened to Guyana, when it became negatively racialized and stratified.

Shineboune's fourth novel, The Last Ship, portrays life on a rural colonial sugar estate, this time, in the context of the arrival of Chinese indentured workers. She portrays the arrival of a first-generation Chinese woman, Clarice Chung who at the age of five, travels from Hong Kong to British Guiana on the last ship to bring the Chinese to the colony. The novel takes us through her life until she dies when she is 65 on the sugar estate where she eventually settled and raised three generations of her family. This novel is not just about Chinese people, it is about the struggle of three generations of a family to find a secure footing in Guyana on a sugar estate, and the price they paid for it, especially the women who struggle to rise above the hardship and humiliation of indentureship and racism in colonial British Guiana. Clarice Chung is a fiercely strong and ambitious woman who exerts her influence mercilessly over her family. Her female descendants find it difficult to follow her example about which they are ambivalent, especially her granddaughter, Joan Wong, who fights against her legacy and tries to escape from it by fleeing to England where she settles down.

=== Short stories ===
- The Godmother and Other Stories (2004) is a collection of stories divided into three parts covering four decades of Guyanese history in Guyana, the UK, and Canada. The first section captures Guyana during a time of change, when transforming from a colony to an independent nation. Even after the transition, characters still face social and class discrimination. In the second section, characters have moved to other countries, but still can not escape old identities. However far away, the characters still find themselves being influenced by Guyana culture. Although the first two sections are struggles faced by natives of Guyana, section three focuses more on the positive outcomes that can be achieved when culture is embraced instead of neglected. This novel provides an insight to the concepts of time and space, as well as identity.

== Awards ==
- National History and Arts Council Literary Competition: 1974
- Guyana Prize for Literature: "Best First Book of Fiction": 1987

== Bibliography ==
- Timepiece (novel), Peepal Tree Press, 1986.
- The Last English Plantation (novel), Peepal Tree Press, 1988.
- Chinese Women (novel), Peepal Tree Press, 2010.
- The Godmother and Other Stories (stories), Peepal Tree Press, 2004.
