= Damali Abrams =

Guyanese-American video-performance artist

- Born: New York City
- Education: New York University; Vermont College of Fine Arts
- Style: Video art

Damali Abrams (born in New York City) is a Guyanese-American video-performance artist who lives and works in New York City. She is known for the Self-Help TV, an ongoing video-performance project using her own body to examine issues of self-improvement, race, class and gender.

== Career ==
Abrams graduated New York University as a Bachelor of Arts in 2001 and obtained a master's degree in fine arts from Vermont College of Fine Arts in 2008. Her work has been exhibited at galleries including The Museum of Contemporary African Diasporan Art (MoCADA), El Museo del Barrio, A.I.R. Gallery, BRIC Rotunda Gallery and the Jamaica Center for Arts & Learning.

=== Teaching and workshops ===
Abrams has led classes at Barbados Community College, the Grenada National Museum, the Borough of Manhattan Community College, Hunter College School of Social Work, SUNY Purchase, Syracuse University’s 601 Tully and at NYU Polytechnic School of Engineering.

=== Residencies ===
- 2019: Creative-in-Residence at The Brooklyn Public Library
- 2016: Independent Study Program at The Whitney Museum of American Art
- July 2014: Apexart’s Outbound Residency to Seoul
- 2014: Artist in Residence at The Center for Book Arts
- October 2013: Residency with Groundation Grenada and Fresh Milk in Barbados
