= Lenny Prince =

American sculptor

- Born: 1965
- Education: Self-taught
- Known for: Sculpture
- Movement: Impressionism
- Awards: Staten Island Advance 3 times
- Website: https://www.lennyscreation.com/

Lenny Prince (born 1965) is a Guyanese-born American sculptor in glass and concrete, best known for his large installation pieces.

== Early life ==
Prince was born in Guyana. He moved to New York at the age of 20, first settling in Brooklyn.

== Career ==
Prince briefly worked as a mechanic. By 1996, he had saved enough money to open Half Price Mufflers. Prince opened Lenny's Creations, a gallery in Staten Island, NY.

== Style ==
Prince adopted a constructivist, cybernetic sculpture style. He makes junkyard still lifes.

== Reception ==
The New York Times dubbed him "The Matisse of Mufflers".

== Work ==
=== Public collections ===
Francis, a giant praying mantis, greets visitors outside the Staten Island Children's Museum in Snug Harbor, New York. He built a space shuttle sculpture out of scrap auto parts for Staten Island, New York.

== Recognition ==
His work was featured in the Staten Island Advance three times.
