= Sharon Maas =

Guyanese novelist (born 1951)

Sharon Maas (born 1951) is a Guyanese-born novelist, who was educated in England, lived in India, and subsequently in Germany and in Sussex, United Kingdom.

== Biography ==
Maas was born in Georgetown, Guyana. She came from a prominently political family of Dutch, Amerindian and Afro-Caribbean descent. Her mother was one of Guyana's earliest feminists, human rights activists and consumer advocates.

She was educated in Guyana and England. After leaving school she worked as a trainee reporter with the Guyana Graphic in Georgetown, Guyana. She later wrote feature articles for the Sunday Chronicle as a staff journalist.

In 1973 she travelled overland to India via England, Turkey, Iran, Afghanistan and Pakistan. After two years in India she moved to Germany, where she married a German. As of 2016, she was working as a social worker in a German hospital. In 2018, after living in Germany for over 40 years, she moved to Ireland, where she is now retired from social work and continues to write.

Her first three novels, published by HarperCollins, focus substantially on their respective protagonists' coming-of-age experience and struggle to find their own, unique identity and place in life ("Bildungsroman"), and are chiefly set against Indian and Guyanese backgrounds. Her fourth book, Sons of Gods is a retelling of the Mahabharata. In 2014 she signed with the UK digital publisher Bookouture, which re-published Of Marriageable Age in May 2014 and several new works. Peacocks Dancing was republished as The Lost Daughter of India and The Speech of Angels was republished as The Orphan of India. Her work has been translated into German, Spanish, French, Danish, Hungarian and Polish.

== Publications ==
- Of Marriageable Age (2000)
- Peacocks Dancing (2002)
- The Speech of Angels (2003)
- Stories of Strength (2005) – short fiction
- Sons of Gods - Mahabharata (2011)
- The Small Fortune of Dorothea Q (2015)
- The Secret Life of Winnie Cox (2015)
- The Sugar Planter's Daughter (2016)
- The Lost Daughter of India (2017)
- The Orphan of India (2017)
- The Girl from the Sugar Plantation (2017)
- The Soldier's Girl (2018)
- The Violin Maker's Daughter (2019)
- Her Darkest Hour (2020)
