= Kwesi Abbensetts =

Guyanese photographer

- Known for: Photography

Kwesi Abbensetts is a Guyanese photographer who lives in New York City.

== Early life ==
Abbensetts was raised in Guyana. His interest in filmmaking and photography came later in life, when he attended college in the United States.

== Education ==
Abbensetts attended Montgomery College in Maryland. He learned photography through experimentation with a Pentax camera. In 2006, he earned a Bachelor of Arts in filmmaking from Brooklyn College. Some of his early influences include filmmaker Spike Lee.

== Awards ==
Awards that Abbensetts has received include the NYFA Artist Fellowship, Darryl Foundation Emergency Grant, Third Horizon Film Festival Artist Award and Film Africa Artwork Competition.

== Exhibitions ==
- Surfaces, the Tropic Series, Jamaica, 2022
