= Mahadai Das =

Guyanese poet

- Born: 1954; Eccles, British Guiana
- Died: 3 April 2003 (aged 48–49); Barbados
- Occupations: Author, poet
- Notable work: A Leaf in His Ear (2003)

Mahadai Das was a Guyanese poet. In 1954, she was born in Eccles, Guyana. She died in Barbados in 2003.

== Background ==
At Bishop's High School, in Mahadai Das's early years she became a student poet. Later, she attended the University of Guyana and then Columbia University, where she earned her BA in Philosophy. In the 1970s, she attended the University of Chicago and earned an MA in Philosophy.

At home, Das had a father, Tilokee Das, and nine siblings whom she reared after their mother died in 1971. After participating in a beauty pageant, Das was crowned Ms. Dewali (1971), a beauty queen.

She penned some of the first published works by Indo-Caribbean women. Her poetry relates to ethnic identity, unique among other female Indo-Caribbean poets of her time. She also wrote on the working conditions in the Caribbean islands.

Around the 1970s, Guyana faced significant social and political problems, including corrupt government and widespread racism. Das was politically active on these issues by joining the birth of the Working People's Alliance. Additionally, she was a volunteer with the Guyana National Service in 1976, where she served to help address youth unemployment in Guyana.

== Death ==
While pursuing her doctorate in philosophy at the University of Chicago, Das became ill and returned to Guyana. She neither published any literary works nor engaged in political activism following her return. Das died on 3 April 2003 in Barbados, from an illness relating to cardiac arrest, which she had suffered 10 days before her death.

== Themes ==
There are many recurring themes in Das's writings, including the poor and unfair working conditions that many Caribbean people have endured throughout their lives. The inequalities between men and women became a prominent theme in her later works. Das explored what it meant to be an Indo-Caribbean woman in these times, where she found herself navigating gender and politics, and the double standard of men's fight for racial equality but not gender equality. Another recurring theme is ethnic identity and self-acceptance despite European pressure. Many of the emerging Caribbean governments post-indentureship had disputes between racial representation and did not wish to place Indo-Caribbeans in political office. Das combated these racist policies in her works; I Want to Be a Poetess of My People (1976) and My Finer Steel Will Grow (1982). These themes, although recurring in Das's many writings and poems, are also common among a majority of Caribbean authors.

== Works ==
Das's publications before I Want to Be a Poetess of My People (1976) were through her local publications and the official literary publication of Guyana's History and Arts Council, KAIE. Her three later published collections of poems were her last publications due to her illness and isolation, cutting her career short. In collaboration with Das's sister, the Peepal Tree Press compiled all of her collected, published, and unpublished poems into A Leaf In His Ear: Selected Poems (Peepal Tree Press Ltd., 2003) Her other collections of poems are currently out of print and are listed below. Several of her poems were included in The Heinemann Book of Caribbean Poetry (Heinemann, 1992).

- I Want to Be a Poetess of My People (1976)
- My Finer Steel Will Grow (1982)
- Bones (Peepal Tree Press Ltd.,1988)

To encourage Guyanese nationalism, Das wrote I Want to Be a Poetess of My People (1976), emphasizing the Guyanese people as a unique and independent culture post-indentureship. My Finer Steel Will Grow (1982) was a response to the corruption and racism growing in the Guyanese government. Das wrote Bones (Peepal Tree Press Ltd.,1988) while in the USA, and it covered the marginalization of women she had experienced and what she had seen globally.
