= Andaiye =

Guyanese social, political, and gender rights activist (1942–2019)

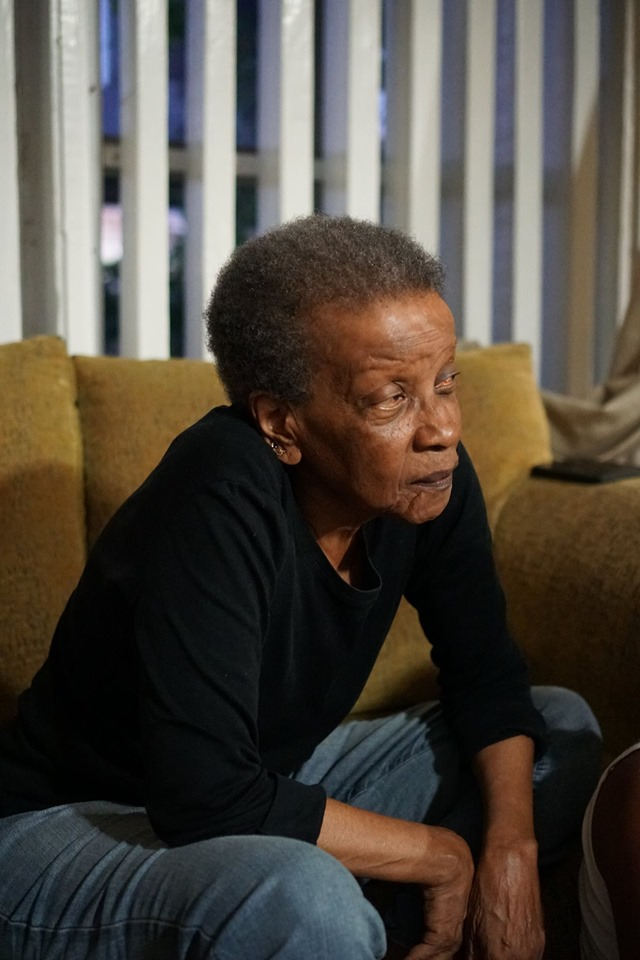
- Andaiye in her home of Guyana
- Born: Sandra Williams; 11 September 1942; Georgetown, British Guiana
- Died: 31 May 2019 (aged 76); Georgetown, Guyana
- Education: Bishops' High School for Girls; University College of the West Indies (BA Hons)
- Occupations: Social, political, and gender rights activist
- Notable work: The Point is to Change the World: Selected Writings (ed. Alissa Trotz), 2020
- Awards: Golden Arrow of Achievement
- Website: andaiye1942-2019.com

Andaiye, born Sandra Williams (11 September 1942 – 31 May 2019), was a Guyanese social, political, and gender rights activist, who has been described as "a transformative figure in the region's political struggle, particularly in the late 1970s, '80s and '90s".

She was an early member of the executive of the Working People's Alliance (WPA) in Guyana, alongside Walter Rodney, among others, and served as Coordinator and Editor, International Secretary and Women's Secretary, until 2000. A founding member of the women's development organization Red Thread in Guyana in 1986, Andaiye was also an executive member of the Caribbean Association for Feminist Research and Action (CAFRA). She worked with the Women and Development Unit of the University of the West Indies (WAND) from 1987 to 1992, and from 1987 to 1996 with CARICOM, where she was a resource person preparatory to the 1995 World Conference on Women held in Beijing. Other groups with which she worked include the Global Women's Strike (GWS), the Women’s International Network for Wages for Caring Work, and Women Against Violence Everywhere (WAVE).

== Biography ==
She was born Sandra Williams in Georgetown Hospital, Georgetown, British Guiana (now Guyana), to Hazel (née Carto) and Frank Williams, who were both nurses at the time of her birth; her brother is Abyssinian Carto. When she was two years old, her father went to London to study medicine, soon joined by her mother, while their daughter was brought up by an aunt and uncle until they returned when she was eight or nine.

She was educated at St Sidwell's Primary School, Georgetown, and for a year and a half in Scotland, where her father did further studies, and on her return to Guyana aged 12 attended Bishops' High School for Girls, going on to the University College of the West Indies in Mona, Jamaica (1961–64), to study Languages, completing a BA Honours degree in French and Spanish. Her studies included a year in France, and she returned to Guyana in 1965, subsequently working as a schoolteacher, while becoming involved with organizations such as Ratoon, New World, and Movement Against Oppression (MAO).

She changed her name in 1970, adopting the Swahili name Andaiye, meaning "a daughter comes home", In 1971 she went to New York, taking a job at Queens College, City University of New York, and becoming increasingly politically active. She returned to live in Guyana in January 1978, having begun to support the fledgling Working People's Alliance (WPA). She said in a 2003 interview, "I worked full time with the WPA from 1978 to 1986, then full time with the WPA and Red Thread from 1986 to 1987 without a wage, and then I worked part time with the Women and Development Unit [WAND] in Barbados, going up occasionally from my base in Guyana."

A cancer survivor for 30 years, she was a founder of the Guyana Cancer Society and Cancer Survivors Action Group. She died on 31 May 2019 at the Woodlands Hospital, Carmichael Street, Georgetown, aged 76. She was acknowledged as "a revolutionary, who fought hard to protect the rights of citizens and particularly women and children" and a statement from the WPA noted that "until the very end she remained a committed soldier of the cause of social justice, women and children rights, working class liberation and ethnic and racial equality." Those who paid their condolences and tributes were led by President David Granger and Prime Minister Moses Nagamootoo, who said: "Andaiye was a champion of the working people and a model fighter for women empowerment. She would be remembered best for her frontline place in the struggle against authoritarian rule."

A celebration of her life was held on Saturday, 8 June 2019, at the Arthur Chung Convention Centre, where tributes were paid by members of Red Thread, the Emancipation Support Committee, the Global Women’s Strike, Help & Shelter, the Working People's Alliance, and many others.

== Awards ==
In 1997, Andaiye was awarded Guyana's national honour of Golden Arrow of Achievement.

== Writings ==
Andaiye contributed articles and chapters to many publications, including the 2019 anthology New Daughters of Africa (edited by Margaret Busby).

Towards the end of her life, Andaiye worked on a collection of writings about growing up in the inequalities of nation, race/ethnicity, class and sex and how this experience shaped her politics. She had compiled a collection of her own writings and speeches from more than 50 years of activism, which was posthumously published by Pluto Press in April 2020 under the title The Point is to Change the World (edited by Alissa Trotz). All proceeds from this book are donated to Red Thread, the organization that Andaiye herself founded.

=== Selected bibliography ===
- (with Peggy Antrobus), Towards a Vision of the Future: Gender Issues in Regional Integration, St. Michael, Barbados: Women and Development Unit, School of Continuing Studies, University of the West Indies, 1991.
- "Women and Poverty in Guyana". In Poverty in Guyana: Finding Solutions. uyana: Institute of Development Studies, University of Guyana, 1993. 35–51.
- The Valuing of Women's Unwaged Work. St. Michael, Barbados: Women and Development Unit, University of the West Indies, 1994.
- Democracy and Development: The Case of Guyana, St. Michael, Barbados: Women and Development Unit, University of the West Indies, 1995.
- "The Red Thread Story: Resisting the Narrow Interests of a Broader Political Struggle". In Suzanne Francis Brown (ed.), Spitting in the Wind: Lessons in Empowerment from the Caribbean, Kingston: Ian Randle Publishers, 2000.
- The Angle You Look From Determines What You See: Towards a Critique of Feminist Politics in the Caribbean, Mona, Jamaica: Centre for Gender and Development Studies, 2002.
- The Point is to Change the World: Selected Writings of Andaiye (ed. Alissa Trotz), Pluto Press, 2020, ISBN 9780745341262.
