= Bernadette Persaud =

Guyanese painter (born 1946)

Bernadette Indira Persuad (born 1946) is a Guyanese painter. She is one of Guyana’s best-known artists, writers and educators. She is a graduate of the University of Guyana and of the Burrows School of Art in Georgetown. Her style is expressionistic, and bears some resemblance to the work of Isaiah James Boodho, Wendy Nanan, and Kenwyn Crichlow of Trinidad and Tobago. Persaud's best series was titled Gentlemen in the Gardens, and depicted camouflaged soldiers in a garden setting. Persaud has also written about art for numerous Guyanese publications.

In 1985 she won the Guyana National Visual Arts Competition. In 2012 she was inducted into the Caribbean Hall of Fame for Excellence.

in 2014 the Guyana National Gallery of Art held a retrospective of her work.
