= Arif Ali (publisher) =

Guyanese journalist (born 1835)

- Born: 13 March 1935 (age 90); Danielstown, British Guiana
- Occupation: Publisher
- Known for: Hansib Books
- Awards: Bocas Henry Swanzy Award

Arif Ali (born 13 March 1935) is a Guyanese-born publisher and newspaper proprietor who migrated to London in 1957. The company he founded in 1970, Hansib, was among pioneering publishers in the UK that disseminated publications of relevance to Britain's black community, others including New Beacon Books (1966) and Bogle-L'Ouverture Publications (1968). Hansib went on to become the largest black publisher in Europe. In March 2024, Ali was announced as winner of the annual Bocas Henry Swanzy Award for Distinguished Service to Caribbean Letters.

== Biography ==
=== Family background and early years ===
One of seven children, Arif Ali was born in Danielstown, on the Essequibo coast, British Guiana (now Guyana); two of his grandparents were Indian indentured labourers, but by the time of his birth the family had become wealthy landowners.

After graduating from high school in Georgetown, Ali left on 12 August 1957 for London, England, intending to study economics, and arrived at Victoria Station on 3 September, having travelled to Britain via the Canary Islands, Spain, Italy and France. He initially worked at different jobs, including on the buses and as a porter in a hospital — where in 1958 he met a young English nurse named Pamela who three months later became his wife.

=== First business ventures ===
In 1966 Ali started to run a greengrocer's in Tottenham Lane, an area with a significant Caribbean population in north London, and before long, as Carolyn Cooper notes, "his business place became a vibrant cultural centre". One of the few outlets for Caribbean provisions such as yams, plantains and cassava, the shop also sold newspapers brought in from Caribbean countries including Guyana, Jamaica, Trinidad and Tobago and Barbados: "The newspapers served to connect West Indians in the diaspora with their respective home territories."

Ali progressed from this to producing on a Gestetner machine a cheaply priced compilation of articles called The Westindian, a venture that proved successful. He sold the food shop and in 1970 founded Hansib Publications — named after his parents, Haniff and Nasibun (Sibby) — specifically to cater for this readership and in April 1971 the company published The Westindian Digest, a magazine for Britain's West Indian communities. In 1973 Hansib published its first book, edited by Ali and entitled Westindians in Great Britain. New editions of this "Who's Who" came out in subsequent years, and with the fifth edition in 1982, the name of the publication was changed to Third World Impact.

=== Newspaper publishing ===
Ali's career as a newspaper publisher started in 1973 with the acquisition of West Indian World from its then owner Aubrey Baynes, who had launched the paper in mid-1971 but had become disillusioned with its financial viability. Under Ali's editorship the West Indian World prospered, campaigning on various educational issues that were affecting black schoolchildren in Britain. Ali went on to further engage and communicate with the Caribbean, African and Asian communities by establishing the Asian Digest (August 1980), the newspapers Caribbean Times (1981), Asian Times (1983) and African Times (1985), as well as Root magazine (1987). By the 1990s he had a staff of 140, publishing three weekly papers and two monthly magazines. The circulation of the Caribbean Times peaked at 28,000, with average sales of about 10,000 copies.

=== Book publishing ===
In 1997 Ali sold his newspapers in order to concentrate on book publishing, and Hansib remains "the biggest and most diverse black book publisher in Britain". Talking to The Guardian in 2010, Ali said: "In the 1960s, mainstream European-led publishing houses rarely published black and minority ethnic (BME) writers' work, if at all. Little positive was written about us, our cultures, our backgrounds and performances. I went into publishing to print stories and feelings that needed telling and would not be produced elsewhere."

By the time of its 40th anniversary, in 2010, Hansib had brought out more than 200 titles, in categories encompassing politics, history, culture, sport, cookery, to multicultural literature including poetry, fiction and memoir, with claims to have for more than four decades "reflected and chronicled the achievements and struggles, the turmoils and frustrations, and the hopes and dreams of Britain's Caribbean, African and Asian communities." Ali himself has edited some of the company's successful titles, among them the Nations Series, illustrated portraits of countries, such as Jamaica Absolutely, Trinidad and Tobago: Terrific and Tranquil and Guyana at 50: Reflection, Celebration and Inspiration.

In parallel with his publishing activities, Ali has been involved over the years with various Black political organisations, and was public relations officer for the West Indian Standing Conference, an umbrella organisation comprising more than 40 UK-based African and Caribbean groups.

== See also ==
- New Beacon Books
- Bogle-L'Ouverture Publications
