= Jan Carew =

Guyanese writer and professor (1920–2012)

- Born: Jan Rynveld Carew; 24 September 1920; Agricola village, British Guiana
- Died: 6 December 2012 (aged 92); Louisville, Kentucky, US
- Resting place: Winston-Salem, North Carolina, US (cremated)
- Citizenship: American
- Education: Berbice High School; Howard University (1945–1946); Western Reserve University (1946–1948); Charles University, Prague (1949–1950); Sorbonne (M.Sc. 1952)
- Occupations: Novelist, playwright, poet, educator
- Spouse(s): Joan Mary Murray (m. 1952); Sylvia Wynter (m. 1958, div. 1971); Joy Gleason (m. 1975)
- Children: Lisa St Aubin de Terán (with Joan Murray); David Christopher Carew (with Sylvia Wynter); Shantoba Eliza Carew (with Joy Gleason)
- Writing career
- Notable works: Black Midas (1958); The Wild Coast (1958)
- Movements: Postcolonialism, 20th Century
- Website: jancarew.blogspot.com

Jan Rynveld Carew (24 September 1920 – 6 December 2012) was a Guyana-born novelist, playwright, poet and educator, who lived at various times in The Netherlands, Mexico, the UK, France, Spain, Ghana, Jamaica, Canada and the United States.

Carew's works, diverse in form and multifaceted, make Jan Carew an important intellectual of the Caribbean world. His poetry and first two novels, Black Midas and The Wild Coast (both published in 1958 by Secker & Warburg in London), were significant landmarks of Caribbean literature then attempting to cope with its colonial past and assert its wish for autonomy.

Carew worked with the late Guyana President Cheddi Jagan in the fight for Guianese independence from Britain. He also played an important part in the Black power movement gaining strength in Britain and North America, publishing reviews and newspapers, producing programmes and plays for radio and television. His scholarly research drove him to question traditional historiographies and the prevailing historical models of the conquest of America. The way he reframed Christopher Columbus as a historical character outside his mythical hagiography became a necessary path in his mind to build anew the Caribbean world on sounder foundations.

== Biography ==
=== Childhood in British Guiana ===
Jan Rynveld Carew was born on 24 September 1920 at Agricola, a coastal village also called Rome, in British Guiana, the South American colony of the British Empire that would become present-day Guyana. He was the middle child and only son of Ethel Robertson and Alan Carew. From 1924 to 1926, the Carews lived in the United States but Jan and his elder sister Cicely returned to Guyana after the kidnapping of his younger sister Sheila in New York in 1926. The child would be recovered and reunited with her family in 1927. Carew's father lived on several occasions in the United States and Canada, working for a while with the Canadian Pacific Railway, and thus crossing the American continent from Halifax to Vancouver. His memories would fuel the imagination of the young Carew.

From 1926 to 1938, he was educated in Guyana, first attending the Agricola Wesleyan School, then the Catholic elementary school, and then Berbice High School, a Canadian Scottish Presbyterian School, in New Amsterdam. He passed his Senior Cambridge Examination in 1938.

After leaving education in 1939, he became a part-time teacher at Berbice High School for Girls, but was called up to the British Army as the Second World War broke out in Europe. He served in the Coast Artillery Regiment until 1943. From 1943 to 1944, he was a customs officer in Georgetown. At that time, he published his first text in the Christmas Annual and was working a lot on his painting and drawing. From 1944 to 1945, he worked at the Price Controls Office in Port-of-Spain, Trinidad.

Carew felt himself to be part of the Caribbean world that for him included "the island archipelago, the countries of the Caribbean littoral and Guyana, Surinam, and Cayenne." He found the paradoxical unity of the Caribbean way of life in the "successive waves of cultural alienation" that shaped the Caribbean frame of mind from "a mosaic of cultural fragments – Amerindian, African, European, Asian."

=== The university years ===
At the age of 25, Carew left Guyana for the United States, where he studied science at Howard University and Western Reserve University (1945–1948), the predecessor of Case Western Reserve University, but left without graduating. Later, he attended Charles University in Prague (1948–1950) and Sorbonne University in Paris.

=== Exile and later years ===
In what he described as his "endless journeyings", Carew lived at different times in the Netherlands, Mexico, the UK, France, Spain, Ghana, Canada and the United States. In 1951, while in the Netherlands, he was editor of De Kim (multilingual poetry magazine in Amsterdam). In Britain, he acted alongside Laurence Olivier and edited the Kensington Post in 1953. He also worked as a broadcaster and writer with the BBC and lectured in race relations at the University of London. He was the first editor of the black-oriented publication Magnet News, launched in London in February 1965.

He always maintained his Caribbean links, and in 1962 served as director of culture in British Guiana under the Jagan administration. According to York University Professor Emeritus Dr. Frank Birbalsingh, "He was a strong supporter of the late Dr. Cheddi Jagan and the People's Progressive Party. He was quite fearless when it came to politics."

Between 1962 and 1966, Carew lived in Jamaica with his then wife Sylvia Wynter, subsequently moving to Canada for some years before settling in the US. During this period he served as editor of African Review in 1965, and in 1969 became publisher of Cotopax (a literary magazine). Carew taught at Princeton, Rutgers, Illinois Wesleyan, Hampshire College, Northwestern and Lincoln Universities and was Emeritus Professor of African American Studies at Northwestern University.

Jan Carew died at his home in Louisville, Kentucky, US, at the age of 92, survived by his widow Dr. Joy Gleason, his daughters Lisa St Aubin de Terán and Shantoba Eliza Carew, and his son, David Christopher Carew.

Carew's memoir Potaro Dreams: My Youth in Guyana was posthumously published in 2014. Envisaged as a first volume, covering the period from birth in 1920 to 1939 when Carew was drawn into the Second World War, the book was described by the author as "the prism" through which he would approach life.

== Activism ==
=== The black movement and the problem of culture ===
Carew was a pioneer in the field of Pan-African Studies. Some of the noted figures to whom Carew has been connected are W. E. B. Du Bois, Paul Robeson, Langston Hughes, Malcolm X, Kwame Nkrumah, Shirley Graham Du Bois, Maurice Bishop, Cheikh Anta Diop, Edward Scobie, John Henrik Clarke, Tsegaye Medhin Gabre, Sterling D. Plumpp and Ivan Van Sertima.

=== The invasion of Grenada and the redefinition of colonial history ===
In his book Grenada: The Hour Will Strike Again (1985), published two years after the United States invasion of Grenada, "Carew unearthed and revealed sources of independence in the country itself. [The book] went back to and beyond the struggles of the rebellious African captives, but to the epic resistance of the island's indigenous population."

=== The environmental issue ===
As noted by Eusi Kwayana, Carew "was an environmentalist long before it become fashionable" and made a recommendation to the government of Guyana for an international involvement for a million acres of forestland in Guyana, which inspired an Act on the Guyanese statute book to provide for approximately 360,000 hectares of tropical rainforest for the purposes of research "to make available to Guyana and the International Community systems, methods, and techniques for the sustainable management and utilisation of the multiple resources of the Tropical forest and the conservation of biological diversity and for matters incidental thereto."

== Selected literary works ==
Carew wrote novels, short stories, plays, memoirs and other non-fiction, as well as children's stories and books, but he remains best known for his first novel, Black Midas (1958). He was a contributor of reviews, articles, short stories and essays to many periodicals, including John O'London's Weekly, Time and Tide, ArtReview, New England Review and Bread Loaf Quarterly, The New York Times, Saturday Review, New Statesman, African Review, The Listener, Journal of African Civilizations, Black Press Review, New Deliberations, Journal of the Association of Caribbean Studies, Black American Literature Forum, Pacific Quarterly, and Race & Class. His many works include:

=== Novels / novellas ===
- Black Midas (London: Secker & Warburg, 1958; Peepal Tree Press, 2009, ISBN 978-1845230951); published as A Touch of Midas in US (New York: Coward, 1958, OCLC 1806950)
- The Wild Coast (London: Secker & Warburg, 1958; Peepal Tree Press, 2009, ISBN 978-1845231101)
- The Last Barbarian (London: Secker & Warburg, 1961, OCLC 5872031)
- Moscow is Not My Mecca (London: Secker & Warburg, 1964, OCLC 781971832); published as Green Winter (Stein & Day, 1965, OCLC 933780002)
- The Riverman – novella (Trenton, NJ: Africa World Press, 1987)
- The Sisters – novella (Trenton, NJ: Africa World Press, 1987)
- The Sisters and Manco's Stories (Oxford: Macmillan Caribbean Writers, 2002, ISBN 978-0333975541)
- The Guyanese Wanderer: Stories (Louisville, KY: Sarabande Books, 2007, ISBN 978-1932511505)

=== Poetry ===
- Streets of Eternity (privately printed, 1952, OCLC 993640795)
- Sea Drums in My Blood (Trinidad: New Voices,1981, OCLC 11707137)
- Return to Streets of Eternity (Smokestack Books, 2015, ISBN 978-0992740986)

=== Juvenile / young adult fiction ===
- Sons of the Flying Wing (Toronto: McClelland & Stewart, 1970)
- The Third Gift, illus. Leo and Diane Dillon (New York: Little Brown & Co., 1974, ISBN 978-0316128476)
- Children of the Sun, illus. Leo and Diane Dillon (New York: Little Brown & Co., 1980, OCLC 317304859)
- Stranger than Tomorrow: Three Stories of the Future (London: Longman, 1976, OCLC 440744211)
- Save the Last Dance for Me, and Other Stories, (London: Longman, 1976, OCLC 614575125)
- The Twins of Ilora (New York: Little, Brown 1977)
- The Lost Love, and Other Stories, Longman (London: Longman, 1978)
- The Man Who Came Back, Longman (London: Longman, 1979, OCLC 16475260)
- The Cat People, Longman (London: Longman, 1979, OCLC 8536408)
- Dark Night, Deep Water (London: Longman, 1981, OCLC 10669934)
- Dead Man's Creek: Two Stories (London: Longman, 1981, OCLC 10669872OCLC 873155438)
- House of Fear: Two Stories (London: Longman, 1981, OCLC 8469937)
- Don't Go Near the Water (London: Longman, 1982, OCLC 1008048809)
- Time Loop (London: Hutchinson Education, 1983, OCLC 16594619)
- Death Comes to the Circus (London: Hutchinson Education, 1983, OCLC 656092996)
- Computer Killer (London: Hutchinson Education, 1985, OCLC 12501734)

=== Non-fiction ===
- Cry Black Power (Toronto: McClelland & Stewart, 1970)
- Rope the Sun (Third Press, 1973)
- (Editor) Out of Time, illus. Howard Phillips (Cardiff: Adult Basic Education Centre, 1975, OCLC 12144228)
- Indian and African Presence in the Americas (Atlanta: Georgia State University, 1984, OCLC 869056075)
- Grenada: The Hour Will Strike Again (Prague: International Organization of Journalists Press, 1985, ISBN 978-0828530811)
- Fulcrums of Change: Origins of Racism in the Americas and Other Essays (Trenton, NJ: Africa World Press, 1988, ISBN 978-0865430334)
- Ghosts in Our Blood: With Malcolm X in Africa, England and the Caribbean (Chicago: Lawrence Hill Books, 1994, ISBN 978-1556522185)
- Rape of Paradise: Columbus and the Birth of Racism in the Americas (Brooklyn: A & B Publishers, 1994; Seaburn Publishing, 2006, ISBN 978-1592320936)
- Potaro Dreams: My Youth in Guyana (Hansib Publications, 2014, ISBN 978-1906190644)
- Episodes in My Life: The Autobiography of Jan Carew — edited by Joy Gleason Carew (Peepal Tree Press, 2015, ISBN 978-1845232450)

=== Essays ===
- "Being Black in Belorussia is Like Being from Mars" (The New York Times, 19 September 1971)
- "Look Bwana, in East Africa you carry a bicycle on the bus, eat crocodile tail and get to know the people who married the wind" (The New York Times, 24 October 1971)
- "The Caribbean writer and exile" (Journal of Black Studies, Vol. 8, No. 4, 1978, pp. 453–475)
- "The fusion of African and Amerindian folk myths" (Caribbean Quarterly, Vol. 23, No. 1, 1977, pp. 7–21 and Bim, Vol. 16, No. 64, 1978, pp. 241–257)
- "Estevanico: The African Explorer" (Journal of African Civilizations, Vol. 3. No. 1, April 1981, pp. 86–99, OCLC 52742691)
- "Columbus and the origins of racism in the Americas: part one" (Race & Class, April 1988, Vol. 29: pp. 1–19)
- "Columbus and the origins of racism in the Americas: part two" (Race & Class, April 1988, Vol. 30: pp. 33–57, OCLC 57376471)
- "United We Stand! Joint Struggles of Native Americans and African Americans in the Columbian Era" (Monthly Review, Vol. 44, No. 3: July–August 1992)
- "Columbus: a harbinger of slavery and racism" (The New York Amsterdam News, 11 July 1992, pp. 2 & 29)
- "Moorish Culture-Bringers: Bearers of Enlightenment" (in Ivan Van Sertima, ed., Golden Age of the Moor, New Brunswick: Transaction Press, 1992, pp. 248–277, OCLC 945916328)
- "Culture and Rebellion" (Race & Class: Special issue – Black America: the street and the campus, Vol. 35, No. 1, July – September 1993)
- "Jonestown revisited" (Eusi Kwayana, A New Look At Jonestown: Dimensions from a Guyanese Perspective, Carib House, 2016, OCLC 1013544834)
- "The Ivory trade: The cruelest trade of all, white gold"
- "The Synergen project"
- "The Amaranth project"

=== Radio plays ===
- 1957: The River Man, BBC
- 1958: The Legend of Nameless Mountain, BBC
- 1958: Anancy and Tiger, BBC
- 1960: The University of Hunger (with Sylvia Wynter) BBC
- 1968: Song of the Riverman, BBC Radio 3

=== Television plays ===
- 1961: The Big Pride (with Sylvia Wynter), ITV/Associated Television
- 1961: The Day of the Fox, Associated Television (starring Sammy Davis Jr.)
- 1963: Exile from the Sun, Associated Television (never performed)
- 1963: The Baron of South Boulevard, Associated Television
- 1963: No Gown for Peter, Associated Television
- 1963: The Raiders, Associated Television
- 1963: The Smugglers, Associated Television
- 1963: A Roof of Stars, Associated Television
- 1963: The Conversion of Tiho, Associated Television
- 1969: Behind God's Back, Canadian Broadcasting Company

=== Stage plays ===
- Black Midas – screenplay
- 1966: The University of Hunger (three-act) – produced in Georgetown, Guyana, at Georgetown Theatre
- 1967: Gentlemen Be Seated – produced in Belgrade, Yugoslavia
- 1970: Black Horse, Pale Rider (two-act) – University of the West Indies, Extra-Mural Department
- 1975: Behind God's Back – Carifesta, Volume 2
- 1987: The Peace Play

== Selected awards ==
Amongst the many awards that Carew received during his lifetime, of note are:

- 1964: Daily Mirror Award for Best Play (for The Big Pride)
- 1974: Illinois Arts Council award for fiction (for the short story "Ti-Zek")
- 1974: American Institute of Graphic Arts Certificate of Excellence (for The Third Gift)
- 1977: Casa de las Américas Prize for poetry,
- 1979: Pushcart prize (for the essay "The Caribbean writer and exile")
- 1985: The Walter Rodney Memorial Award from the Association of Caribbean Studies
- 1985: National Film Institute Award (for screenplay of Black Midas)
- 1990: The Hansib Publication Award
- 1991: The Franz Fanon Freedom Award
- 1998: The Paul Robeson Award (for "living a life of art and politics")
- 2002: The Clark-Atlanta University Nkyinkyim Award
- 2003: The Caribbean-Canadian Lifetime Creative Award from the Caribbean Canadian Literary Exposition
- 2008: Independent Publisher Bronze Prize for Multicultural Fiction (for The Guyanese Wanderer)
