= Grace Nichols =

Guyanese poet

Grace Nichols FRSL
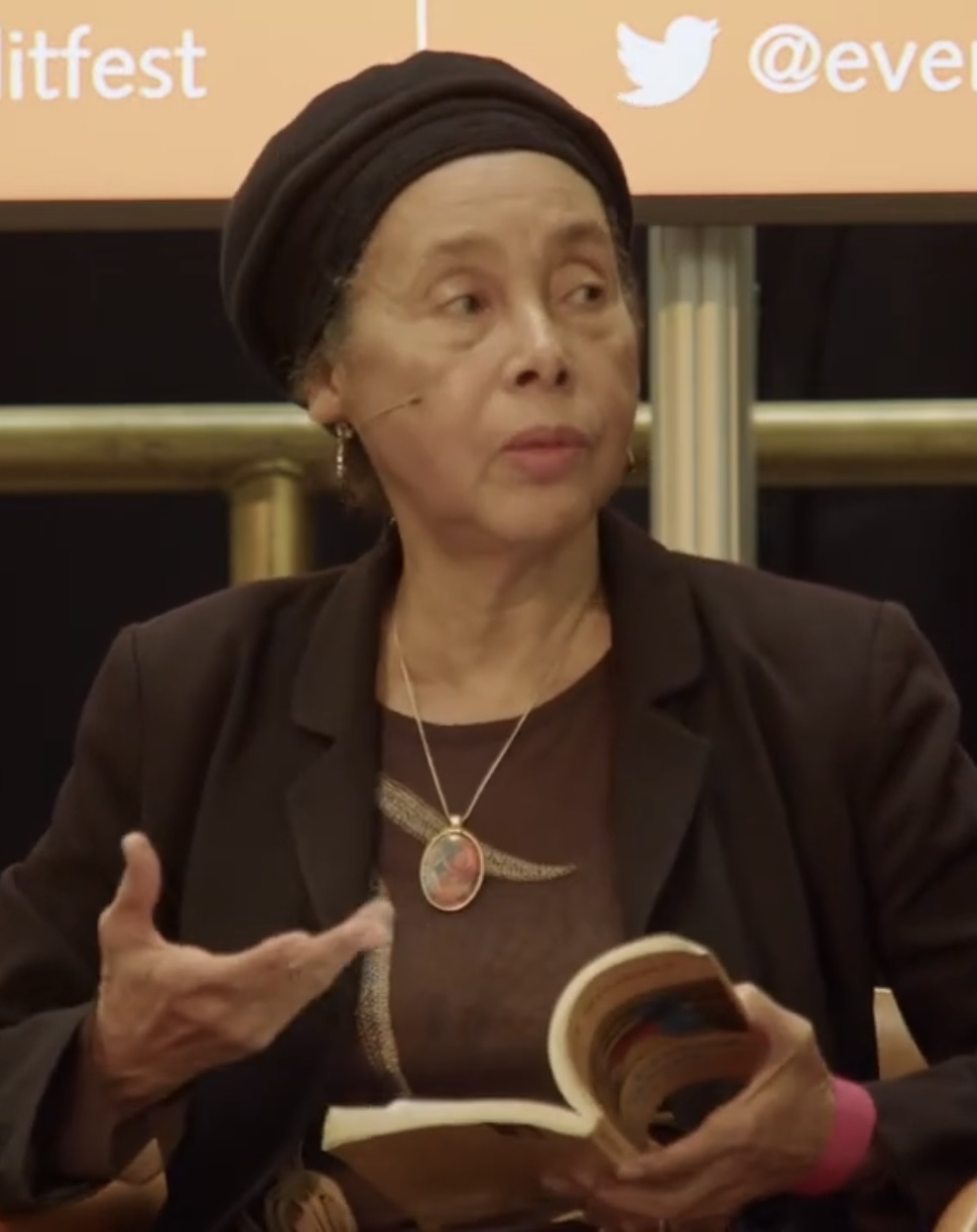
- Nichols at the British Library in 2022
- Born: 1950 (age 75–76); Georgetown, Guyana
- Occupations: Poet, teacher, journalist
- Notable work: I is a Long-Memoried Woman (1983); Sunris (1996)
- Spouse: John Agard
- Awards: Commonwealth Poetry Prize, 1983; Guyana Poetry Prize, 1996; Queen's Gold Medal for Poetry, 2021

Grace Nichols (born 1950) is a Guyanese poet who moved to Britain in 1977, before which she worked as a teacher and journalist in Guyana. Her first collection, I is a Long-Memoried Woman (1983), won the Commonwealth Poetry Prize. In December 2021, she was announced as winner of the Queen's Gold Medal for Poetry.

== Early years and education ==
Grace Nichols was born in Georgetown, and lived in a small village on the country's coast until her family moved to the city when she was eight years old. She took a Diploma in Communications from the University of Guyana, and subsequently worked as a teacher (1967–70), as a journalist and in government informations services, before she migrated to the United Kingdom in 1977. Much of her poetry is characterised by Caribbean rhythms and culture, and influenced by Guyanese and Amerindian folklore.

== Literary career ==
Her first collection of poetry, I is a Long-Memoried Woman won the 1983 Commonwealth Poetry Prize. A film adaptation subsequently won a gold medal at the International Film and Television Festival of New York, and the book was dramatised for BBC radio. Her novel for adults, Whole of a Morning Sky, was published in 1986. In 1992, her work featured in the anthology Daughters of Africa (edited by Margaret Busby).

Nichols has published several further books of poetry, including in 2006 volume of new and selected poems, Startling the Flying Fish, and her books for children encompass collections of short stories and poetry anthologies. Her poetry is featured in the AQA, WJEC (Welsh Joint Education Committee), and Edexcel English/English Literature IGCSE anthologies – meaning that many GCSE students in the UK have studied her work. Her religion is Christianity after she was influenced by the UK's many religions and multi-cultural society.

=== Anthologise — annual poetry competition for schools ===
In 2011, Nichols was a member of the first ever judging panel for a new schools poetry competition named "Anthologise", spearheaded by Poet Laureate Carol Ann Duffy. School students aged 11–18 from around the UK were invited to create and submit their own anthologies of published poetry. The first ever winners of Anthologise were the sixth-form pupils of Monkton Combe School, Bath, with their anthology titled The Poetry of Earth is Never Dead.

== Honours and recognition ==
Nichols has been the recipient of several awards for her poetry, beginning with the Commonwealth Poetry Prize in 1983, for I is a Long Memoried Woman, and her work is on several GCSE syllabuses.

In 2021, Nichols was the recipient of the Queen's Gold Medal for Poetry, on the basis of her body of work, chosen by a committee chaired by Poet Laureate Simon Armitage.

in 2026, Grace Nichols won the Royal Society of Literature's Pioneer Prize.

== Personal life ==
She lives in Lewes, East Sussex, with her partner, the Guyanese poet John Agard.

Nichols has five sisters and one brother, whose names have not been publicly disclosed. Nichols also immigrated to the United Kingdom due to the political and economic climate in Guyana. Her husband also influenced her move.

== Bibliography ==
- I is a Long-Memoried Woman, London: Karnak House, 1983 to 1984
- The Fat Black Woman's Poems, London: Virago Press, 1984
- A Dangerous Knowing: Four Black Women Poets (Barbara Burford, Gabriela Pearse, Grace Nichols, Jackie Kay), London: Sheba, 1985
- Whole of a Morning Sky (novel), London: Virago Press, 1986
- Over the River, 1986
- Hurricane Hits England, 1987
- Come into my Tropical Garden (poems), 1988
- Lazy Thoughts of a Lazy Woman (poems), 1989
- Sunris (poems), London: Virago, 1996
- Startling the Flying Fish, 2006
- Picasso, I Want My Face Back, Bloodaxe Books, 2009
- I Have Crossed an Ocean: Selected Poems, Bloodaxe, 2010
- Island Man
- The Insomnia Poems, 2017
- Passport to Here and There, Bloodaxe, 2020

== Poems ==
- "Old Canecutter at Airport", 2019 from the collection Startling the Flying Fish (2006).
- "Humming With History", from the collection I is a Long-Memoried Women (1983-1984).
- "Love Act from the collection", from the collection I Have Crossed an Ocean (2010).
- "Tea with Demerara Sugar; Battle", from the collection Passport to Here and There (2020).

== Themes ==
Grace Nichols’ poetry examines how history and identity are carried through the everyday experiences of Caribbean women. One of the major themes in her work is historical memory, which she often expresses through the physical body. Nichols treats the body as a kind of “living archive,” a place where the effects of colonialism and the shaping of Caribbean identity are remembered and held. This idea appears strongly in The Fat Black Woman’s Poems, where Nichols uses images of the body to challenge erasure and to affirm the presence and visibility of Black women’s confidence.

Language also plays an important role in Nichols’ writing. Creole speech patterns and the rhythms of oral storytelling is used as a way for Caribbean women to reclaim their voices. Language becomes a form of resistance in Nichols’ work, allowing her poetry to honor the past while speaking to contemporary experiences. Together, these themes embodiment, memory, and the power of language form a core part of Nichols’ contribution to Caribbean literature.

== Awards ==
- 1983: Commonwealth Poetry Prize (for I is a Long Memoried Woman)
- 1986: Arts Council Writers' Award
- 1996: Guyana Poetry Prize (for Sunris)
- 2000: Cholmondeley Award
- 2007: Elected a Fellow of the Royal Society of Literature
- 2008: Guyana Poetry Award Never live unloved
- 2021: Queen’s Gold Medal for Poetry
