= Guyanese literature =

Cultural expression from Guyana

Guyanese literature covers works including novels, poetry, plays and others written by people born or strongly-affiliated with Guyana. Formerly British Guiana, British language and style has an enduring impact on the writings from Guyana, which are done in English language and utilizing Guyanese Creole. Emigration has contributed to a large body of work relating the Guyanese diaspora experience.

== History of Guyanese literature ==
=== European perspective ===
The first book written on Guyana, by Sir Walter Raleigh in the 16th century, was The Discoverie of the Large, Rich, and Beautiful Empyre of Guiana (With a Relation of the Great and Golden Citie of Manoa (Which the Spanyards call El Dorado) and of the Provinces of Emeria, Aromaia, Amapaia, and Other Countries, with Their Riulers, Adjoyning (Robert Robinson: London, 1596). Many travelogues have been published by explorers or missionaries from Europe. The sparsely populated, pristine hinterlands of Guyana continue to be a subject of interest for contemporary Guyanese literature – this setting can be traced to one of the nation's earliest novels, In Guiana Wilds: A Study Of Two Women (1899), by James Rodway.

=== Guyanese voice ===
Guyana's history has been substantially shaped by immigration, and writings often address the topics of slavery and indenture, as well as reflecting the culture of the various immigrant groups. One of the earliest and most notable Guyanese authors was Edgar Mittelholzer, author of Corentyne Thunder (1941). His works often deal with issues of interracial relations, particularly the strain between European and non-European Guyanese. Kyk-Over-Al literary journal, published in 1945 and edited by A. J. Seymour, collected poetry and other works from Guyana and the West Indies. A major contributor, Martin Carter, is considered Guyana's greatest poet. Mid-20th century, poetry served as a medium to express the Guyanese identity, in light of independence from British colonial rule and creating a style unique to the country.

The political climate of the mid-20th century of anti-colonial and Proletariat attitudes fostered interest in socialism, and subsequently became a matter written about in the Guyanese context. Socialist literature was acquired and disseminated by the People's Progressive Party, leading to legislature to pass an Undesirable Publications Ordinance to ban such books. Political activists at the time, such as Eusi Kwayana, Cheddi and Janet Jagan, taught informal classes among estate laborers, expanding education and political ideology.

Historian and intellectual Walter Rodney is most widely regarded for his book How Europe Underdeveloped Africa (1972). Travelling and teaching widely, he was a proponent of Pan-Africanism and a supporter of the downtrodden. Rodney returned to Guyana in 1974 and was active in the opposition movement, leading to his assassination in 1980. Rodney was involved with the New World Group, which was a collection of Guyanese academics notable for producing the New World Quarterly, a journal published from 1963 to 1972. New World Quarterly was an outlet for academics within the Caribbean to examine development, socialism, and other regional issues, but also the "original publication of poems, reviews and commentaries".

During his presidency, Forbes Burnham promoted literature and art in Guyana, initiating the 1972 Caribbean Festival of Arts, which showcased the arts coming from the Caribbean.

Michael Abbensetts was a noted playwright of works for the stage and television in the UK, whose work included the drama series—Empire Road, which BBC TV aired from 1978 to 1979.

=== Amerindian influence and language ===
The Indigenous peoples in Guyana did not use written language at the advent of their interaction with the early European explorers, nonetheless, their oral traditions and culture have been documented to varying degrees since that time and continue to have a presence in contemporary Guyanese literature. Older accounts tend to betray the nature of the author's relation to the Amerindians, such as missionaries reframing indigenous spirituality to a Christian context or colonial authorities, however the accounts themselves are of great historical value. W. H. Brett and Walter Roth wrote significantly on their experiences with various Amerindian tribes in the late 1800s to early 1900s.

Indigenous languages have been in decline in favor of English (as well as Guyanese Creole or Portuguese), but revival efforts have included establishing a written standard as well as compiling dictionaries. The government, the bureau of Amerindian affairs, the University of Guyana, as well as various non-government organizations have been involved in language preservation. Christian missionary work has led to bible translations in various Amerindian languages.

=== Indian influence ===
The descendants of indentured Indians have also made important contributions to Guyanese literature. Significant writers include Joseph Rahomon and Shana Yardan.

== Literature awards ==
The Guyana Prizes for Literature were founded by President Desmond Hoyte in 1987, with a view to promoting the development of local literature. Prizes are awarded biennially in categories including best book of fiction, best first book of fiction, best book of poems, best first book of poems, and best play. The Guyana Prizes are managed by a committee consisting of a number of university personnel, and the chief librarian of the Guyana National Library.

The prize returned in 2023 after a seven-year hiatus.

Winners have included, Wilson Harris, Fred D'Aguiar, David Dabydeen, Roy A.K. Heath, D. Gokarran Sukhdeo, Pauline Melville, Ian McDonald, Cyril Dabydeen and Ruel Johnson.

=== Guyana Poetry Prize ===
Notable winners include Fred D'Aguiar, Grace Nichols, Ian McDonald.

=== Guyana Prize for Caribbean Literature ===
In 2010, the government of Guyana provided funds to the Management Committee of the Guyana Prize for the first Guyana Prize for Literature Caribbean Award, in the categories of fiction, poetry and drama, with published books by citizens of Caribbean countries (CARICOM States, the Commonwealth Caribbean, the Netherlands Antilles) being eligible.

=== Other ===
The Wordsworth McAndrew Award, based in New York, awards literary and other achievements relating to Guyanese culture.

== See also ==
- List of Guyanese writers
- Culture of Guyana
- List of newspapers in Guyana

== Sources ==
- Balkaran, Lal (ed.), Bibliography of Guyana & Guyanese Writers 1596-2004: An A–Z Guide of Books on Guyana by Guyanese and Non-Guyanese Writers and On Other Subjects by Guyanese Writers, with a Foreword by Professor Jan Carew (LBA Publications, Canada).
