= Caribbean Festival of Arts =

Annual festival promoting arts in the Caribbean

Caribbean Festival of Arts, commonly known as CARIFESTA, is a bi-annual festival for promoting arts of the Caribbean with a different country hosting the event each year. It was started to provide a venue to "depict the life of the people of the Region, their heroes, morals, myths, traditions, beliefs, creativity and ways of expression" by fostering a sense of Caribbean unity, and motivating artists by showing the best of their home country. It began under the auspices of Guyana's then President Forbes Burnham in 1972, who was inspired by other singular arts festivals in the region.

== Events ==
According to the CARICOM Organisation, CARIFESTA aims to:

- depict the life of the people of the region - their heroes, morale, myth, traditions, beliefs, creativeness, ways of expression.
- show the similarities and the differences of the people of the Caribbean and Latin America
- create a climate in which art can flourish so that artists would be encouraged to return to their homeland.
- awaken a regional identity in Literature.
- stimulate and unite the cultural movement throughout the region.

=== Performing arts ===
The festival includes both a cultural opening and closing ceremony.

Presentations range from elaborate musical productions to comedy, fantasy, ritual, history, folk plays and legend. Some of the artists from the first CARIFESTA include Conjunto Folklorico Nacionale of Cuba, the Ol'Higue and Baccos of Guyana, Shango dancers from Trinidad, Shac Shac musicians from Dominica. Concerts, recitals and musical shows provide folk rhythms, jazz, as well as pop, classics. There are Indian tablas, African drums, Caribbean steel pan, piano, violin, flute and guitar. Traditional dance reflecting the wide array of diversity in the Caribbean including Javanese dancing, intricate ballet, earthy folk plays, dramatic modern choreography, classical Indian movements, spontaneous improvisations and pop.

=== Visual arts ===
Exhibitions include sculpture, graphics, paintings, drawings, and photographs. Craft demonstrations of ceramics, wood carving, painting and drawing.

=== Literature ===
An anthology of new writing from the Caribbean region is produced for CARIFESTA, and authors often launch their works at the festivals. There are also poetry recitals and lecture discussions at universities and Conference centres.

=== Culture education ===
Host countries such as Guyana and Suriname that boast diverse heritage showcase historical exhibits and anthropological studies of the indigenous people. There are events and activities for children and families.

=== Host countries ===
| Ed. | Year | Host country | Dates |
|---|---|---|---|
| I | 1972 | Guyana | Aug 25 – Sep 15 |
| II | 1976 | Jamaica | July 23 – Aug 2 |
| III | 1979 | Cuba | July 16–22 |
| IV | 1981 | Barbados | July 19 – Aug 3 |
| V | 1992 | Trinidad and Tobago | August 22–28 |
| VI | 1995 | Trinidad and Tobago | August 19–Sept 2 |
| VII | 2000 | Saint Kitts and Nevis | August 17–26 |
| VIII | 2003 | Suriname | August 25–30 |
| IX | 2006 | Trinidad and Tobago | August 10–15 |
| X | 2008 | Guyana | August 22–31 |
| XI | 2010 | The Bahamas | Cancelled |
| XI | 2013 | Suriname | August 16–26 |
| XII | 2015 | Haiti | August 21–30 |
| XIII | 2017 | Barbados | August 17–27 |
| XIV | 2019 | Trinidad and Tobago | August 16–25 |
| XV | 2021 (Postponed); 2022 (Cancelled) | Antigua and Barbuda | Cancelled |
| XV | 2025 | Barbados | August 22-31 |
| XVI | 2027 | Guyana | TBD |

== History ==
The idea of CARIFESTA was based on a similar event that took place in Puerto Rico in 1952. When Georgetown, Guyana hosted a Caribbean Writers and Artists Convention in 1966 and 1970, it encouraged President Forbes Burnham to host an arts festival on a grander scale, thus CARIFESTA was created and took place in 1972. Guyana had recently gained independence, which prompted a need to "develop a Caribbean personality." The success of this festival led to the "establishment of a permanent unit within the Secretariat" under the new CARICOM organization, grating them oversight and establishing different hosts among the territories of the Caribbean. A commemorative stamp was issued in Guyana to mark the occasion.

In 2008 a task force was set up by CARICOM to develop and identify financing for cultural industries in the region. Dr. Hilary Brown, CARICOM Secretariat’s Programme Manager for Culture and Community Development, made this announcement at the 21st Meeting of the Regional Cultural Committee (RCC), which opened at the Courtyard Marriott in Paramaribo, Suriname, on December 1.“The Caribbean Community welcomes the offer of the Government of Suriname to host CARIFESTA XI in 2013 and we are all looking forward to the event with great anticipation, she stated,” noting that CARICOM was at a “crossroads in the development of this highly valued regional expose’ of Caribbean arts and culture.”

In 2009, CARIFESTA returned to Guyana, attracting over 1000 participants of all ages.

In July 2012 in Saint Lucia, Haitian President Michel Martelly expressed interest in hosting CARIFESTA to increase cultural relations with other neighboring nations.

2013 - Apart from the 15-member CARICOM grouping, the event plans to attract countries of the Union of South American Nations (UNASUR), of which Suriname became a full member. President Dési Bouterse anticipated that Suriname would host more than 2,000 participants, given the fact that the contingents from each country should number at least 50. The festival was held in the historic wooden inner city of Paramaribo and the organizers said “from the Independence Square and the Presidential Palace, down to the heart of town, people are supposed to feel that CARIFESTA is in town. Paramaribo is going to be a Festival City that week”.

Trinidad and Tobago hosted the event in 2019 from August 16 to 25 for the fourth time under the theme "Connect, Share Invest". Twenty-four countries registered to attend, including non-CARICOM countries such as Curaçao, Colombia, and Guadeloupe. The hub of CARIFESTA XIV was Caribbean Grand Market located in Queen's Park Savannah with over 100 events across both islands.

== See also ==
- World Festival of Black Arts
