= Donald Hinds =

Jamaican journalist, writer and educator (1934–2023)

- Donald Hinds, c. 1964–65
- Born: Donald Lloyd Hinds; 13 January 1934; Kingston, Colony of Jamaica, British Empire
- Died: 13 March 2023 (aged 89); England
- Occupations: Writer; journalist; educator
- Notable work: Journey to an Illusion (1966)
- Spouse: Dawn Bruce (m. 1961)

Donald Hinds (13 January 1934 – 13 March 2023) was a Jamaican-born writer, journalist, historian and teacher. He is best known for his work on the West Indian Gazette and his fiction and non-fiction books portraying the West Indian community in Britain, particularly his 1966 work Journey to an Illusion, which has been called a groundbreaking book that "captured the plight of Commonwealth immigrants and foresaw the multicultural London of today".

== Biography ==
Donald Lloyd Hinds was born in Kingston, Jamaica, on 13 January 1934, and grew up in a village in the parish of Saint Thomas with his grandparents, his mother and stepfather having migrated to Britain.

In 1955, aged 21, Hinds decided to travel to London, England, to join his mother. He had qualified as a probationary teacher in Jamaica but like many other West Indian migrants to the UK was unable to find employment that matched his qualifications. He eventually got a job with London Transport as a bus conductor, working out of Brixton bus garage in Streatham Hill.

While working on the buses Hinds met Theo Campbell, a local Jamaican businessman who owned London's first black record shop at 250 Brixton Road. The record shop shared the building with the West Indian Gazette. Campbell introduced Hinds to Claudia Jones, the newspaper's editor, and Hinds began working for the paper in the summer of 1958. As the paper's "City Reporter", he was a regular contributor until Jones's death in 1964.

Between 1959 and 1963, Hinds was also broadcasting on BBC Caribbean, often reading short stories based on his experiences working on the buses. After The Observer published a piece by him on West Indian schoolchildren in Britain, he was approached by a literary agent, which led to the commissioning of a book by Heinemann. Receiving an advance of £100 — the equivalent at the time of eight weeks' wages as a bus conductor — Hinds was emboldened to leave his job with London Transport to concentrate on his writings. Journey to an Illusion: The West Indian in Britain — a series of interviews, together with autobiographical writing and social comment — was first published in 1966. "One of the great works of journalism to have come out of the Jamaican-British encounter", the book was reissued in 2001 by Bogle-L'Ouverture Press and, in the words of Anne Walmsley: "Journey to an Illusion remains a classic of the West Indian immigrant experience."

Hinds was one of the writers associated with the influential Caribbean Artists Movement (CAM) that flourished from 1966 to 1972, a cultural initiative primarily set up by Kamau Brathwaite, John La Rose and Andrew Salkey, with the subsequent involvement of other notable artists and intellectuals including C. L. R. James, Stuart Hall, Wilson Harris, Kenneth Ramchand, Ronald Moody, Aubrey Williams, Gordon Rohlehr, Christopher Laird, Louis James, Orlando Patterson, Ivan Van Sertima, Althea McNish, James Berry, Errol Lloyd and Anne Walmsley. Hinds joined CAM's committee and in 1969 took over editorship of the organization's Newsletter. In February 1971, he chaired and introduced CAM's public session on "Contemporary African Poetry", at which Femi Fatoba from Nigeria and Cosmo Pieterse from Namibia participated with their Caribbean peers.

Hinds also worked for Magnet, a newspaper launched in the 1960s with Jan Carew as its first editor. While continuing to write, Hinds went on to become a teacher and subsequently a lecturer in education at South Bank University, retiring in 2007.

In 2014, Hansib published his first novel, Mother Country: In the Wake of a Dream, set in Brixton in the 1950s and dealing with the dreams and realities lived by Jamaicans who settled in the "Mother Country" during that era. Describing the book as "an absorbing hybrid of fiction and reportage" in a Financial Times review, Ian Thomson says: "Mother Country, a work of documentary authenticity and rare narrative verve, takes us to the heart of the West Indian immigrant experience in postwar London."

Hinds was one of those interviewed for When I Came to England, an anthology by Z. Nia Reynolds of oral accounts by newly arrived West Indians of life in the "mother country".

National Life Stories conducted an oral history interview (C1149/25) with Donald Hinds in 2012 for its Oral History of Oral History collection held by the British Library. He features in Colin Grant's oral history Homecoming: Voices of the Windrush Generation (2019).

Hinds died on 13 March 2023, at the age of 89, survived by his wife Dawn (née Bruce), whom he married in 1961.

== List of works ==
Non-fiction books and essays

- Journey to an Illusion: The West Indian in Britain (Heinemann, 1966), Bogle-L'Ouverture Press, 2001, ISBN 978-0904521252
- "The 'Island' of Brixton", Oral History: The Journal of the Oral History Society, Vol. 8, No. 1 (Spring 1980), pp. 49–51
- Black Peoples of America, 1500–1900, Collins Educational, 1992, ISBN 978-0003272413
- Native Peoples in America, Collins, 1995, ISBN 978-0003272956

Novels and short stories

- "Busman's Blues" in Andrew Salkey (ed), Stories from the Caribbean: an anthology, Elek Books, 1965
- Mother Country: In the Wake of a Dream, Hansib Publications, 2014, ISBN 978-1906190682
