= Anne Walmsley =

British editor, critic and author (1931–2025)

- Born: September 1931; United Kingdom
- Died: 12 July 2025 (aged 93)
- Education: Durham University; Sussex University
- Occupations: Editor; scholar; critic; author
- Known for: Specialist in Caribbean art and literature
- Notable work: The Caribbean Artists Movement: A Literary and Cultural History, 1966–1971 (1992); Art in the Caribbean (2010)
- Movement: Caribbean Artists Movement
- Awards: Henry Swanzy Award, 2018

Anne Walmsley (September 1931 – 12 July 2025) was a British-born editor, scholar, critic and author, notable as a specialist in Caribbean art and literature over a period of five decades. She was widely recognised for her work as Longman's Caribbean publisher, and for Caribbean books that she authored and edited. Her anthology for schools, The Sun's Eye: West Indian Writing for Young Readers (1968), drew on her use of local literary material while teaching in Jamaica. A participant in and chronicler of the Caribbean Artists Movement, Walmsley was also the author of The Caribbean Artists Movement: A Literary and Cultural History, 1966–1971 (1992) and Art in the Caribbean (2010). She lived in London.

== Life and career ==
Anne Walmsley was born in September 1931. She held a BA in English from Durham University, and an MA in African Studies from Sussex University.

In the late 1950s, she worked for four years as a secretary at Faber and Faber, before going on to teach for three years at Westwood High School in Jamaica. On returning to London, she was employed for a while with the BBC Schools television service, before joining the publisher Longman in 1967 as their first editor for the Caribbean, focused on providing local educational material, in which role she travelled throughout the region for nine years. Her experience teaching in Jamaica between 1959 and 1963 informed her compilation of the anthology The Sun's Eye, which drew on Caribbean literary material; published in 1968, the anthology went on to secure an ongoing presence on school syllabuses. Caribbean writers published at Longman's on Walmsley's watch include Roy Heath (whose first novel, A Man Come Home, she took on in 1974), George Lamming, Samuel Selvon and Ismith Khan.

During this time Walmsley participated in the Caribbean Artists Movement (CAM), founded in 1966 by Kamau Brathwaite (known then L. Edward Brathwaite), John La Rose and Andrew Salkey. Her account of attending CAM's first conference – alongside Brathwaite, La Rose, Salkey, C. L. R. James, George Lamming, Michael Anthony, Andrew Salkey, Aubrey Williams, Ronald Moody, Marina Maxwell, Lloyd Reckord, Gordon Rohlehr, Elsa Goveia, Kenneth Ramchand, Calvin Hernton, and many other notables – in September 1967 at Eliot College, Kent, was published in BIM magazine the following year.

After 10 years as Longman's Caribbean publisher, Walmsley spent two years in Nairobi as Publishing Manager for Longman Kenya, and on her return to the UK she took an MA in African Studies at the University of Sussex. She subsequently worked as a freelance editor and consultant, and was also active with ATCAL (the Association for the Teaching of Caribbean and Africa Literature, founded in the late 1970s).

In 1985, she began research into CAM, funded by a Leverhulme Fellowship. Another landmark anthology, Facing the Sea (1986), co-edited by Walmsley (with Nick Caistor), introduced writing from the Dutch, French and Spanish Caribbean to secondary school students of the Anglophone Caribbean, its regional span prompted by discussion of such writing in CAM. In 1992, she was awarded a PhD from the University of Kent for her thesis on CAM. That same year it was published as a book by New Beacon Books, entitled The Caribbean Artists Movement: A Literary and Cultural History, 1966–1971, and is considered to be a "groundbreaking study". Walmsley donated her research material for the book to the George Padmore Institute.

Walmsley additionally taught part of an MA course, "Aspects of Caribbean Art", at the School of Oriental and African Studies, University of London, in 2000.

Walmsley's articles appeared in many journals and literary magazines over the years, among them BIM, Wasafiri, South, BOMB, ArtsEtc, and elsewhere. She also contributed essays to exhibition catalogues and produced critical writings on Caribbean visual artists, especially Aubrey Williams. Her 1990 book Guyana Dreaming, which Williams saw in manuscript 10 days before his death, was the first significant publication on the artist's work. She co-edited Art in the Caribbean: an Introduction with Stanley Greaves, in collaboration with Christopher Cozier, launching the volume at the October Gallery in October 2010.

Walmsley died on 12 July 2025, at the age of 93. She had lived for many years in Wimbledon, London, with her husband Ron Farquhar, who predeceased her in 2021.

== The Anne Walmsley Collection & Archive ==
In 2016–17, she donated her collection of documents on Caribbean art – including exhibition catalogues, photographs, interviews and correspondence with artists, and other papers – to the Alma Jordan Library at the University of the West Indies, Trinidad and Tobago.

Earlier, she had donated her Caribbean Artists Movement (CAM) research material to the George Padmore Institute in London, her correspondence with Caribbean writers over many years to the University of Sussex, and her library of Caribbean literature to the University of Newcastle.

Later in 2018, Walmsley donated material to Newcastle University Robinson Library Special Collections and Archives, as part of the Walmsley (Anne) Archive.

== Awards ==
Walmsley was awarded an honorary doctorate from the University of the West Indies, Mona campus, Jamaica, in 2009. The citation stated: "Dr. Anne Walmsley has long crossed over from being a distant enthusiast or detached observer of the still flowering Caribbean literary and artistic tradition: rather we can comfortably recognize her as an integral and active component of the Caribbean Artists Movement."

At the NGC Bocas Lit Fest in 2018, Walmsley was named as the recipient of the annual Henry Swanzy Award in recognition of her distinguished service to Caribbean letters, previous awardees having been John La Rose and Sarah White of New Beacon Books in 2013, Ken Ramchand and Gordon Rohlehr (2014), Margaret Busby (2015), Jeremy Poynting (2016), and Joan Dayal (2017). In the words of the Trinidad and Tobago Guardian, reporting the 2018 award: "One of the most avid supporters and facilitators of Caribbean literature for many decades, Anne Walmsley shepherded key writers into print during her time at Longman, and her school anthologies exposed generations of Caribbean children to the literature of their home region."

== Selected bibliography ==
- Editor, The Sun's Eye: West Indian Writing for Young Readers, Longman, 1968; revised 1989, ISBN 978-0582766495. New edition (Caribbean Contemporary Classics), Hachette, 2021, ISBN 9781398307841.
- With Nick Caistor, Facing the Sea: a new anthology from the Caribbean region for secondary schools (illustrated by Errol Lloyd; preface by Edward Kamau Brathwaite), Heinemann, 1986, ISBN 978-0435987954
- Guyana Dreaming: The Art of Aubrey Williams, Dangaroo Press, 1990, ISBN 978-1871049077
- The Caribbean Artists Movement: A Literary and Cultural History, 1966–1971, London and Port of Spain: New Beacon Books, 1992, ISBN 978-1873201060
- With Guy Brett, Gilane Tawadros and Andrew Dempsey, Aubrey Williams, inIVA, 1998
- Art in the Caribbean: A Postcard Pack for Schools, Upton, Oxfordshire: Goodwill Art Service, 2003
- With Stanley Greaves, Art in the Caribbean: an Introduction, New Beacon Books, 2010, ISBN 978-1873201060
