= Savacou =

Caribbean literary journal, published 1970–1980

Savacou Magazine
- Editor: Edward Kamau Brathwaite, Andrew Salkey, and John La Rose
- Categories: Cultural-Political Magazine
- Frequency: infrequently
- Founded: 1970
- Final issue: 1980
- Company: Private
- Country: Jamaica
- Language: English
- Website: Website

Savacou: A Journal of the Caribbean Artists Movement was a journal of literature, new writing and ideas founded in 1970 as a small co-operative venture, led by Edward Kamau Brathwaite, on the Mona campus of the University of the West Indies, Jamaica.

== History ==
Characterised as "groundbreaking" by Alison Donnell, Savacou grew out of The Caribbean Artists Movement (CAM) of the 1960s, which was mostly concerned with Caribbean artistic production and with consolidating a broad artistic alliance between all "Third World" peoples. The journal took its name from the bird-god in Carib mythology who controlled thunder and strong winds. Issue 1 of Savacou was published in June 1970, edited by Brathwaite, Kenneth Ramchand and Andrew Salkey. Its advisory committee included John La Rose, Lloyd King, Gordon Rohlehr, Orlando Patterson, Sylvia Wynter, Paule Marshall and Wilfred Cartey, and among its early contributors were C. L. R. James, Michael Anthony, Derek Walcott, George Lamming, Martin Carter and John Figueroa.

The journal was the subject of regional controversy in 1970, with the double issue 3/4, "New Writing 1970: An anthology of poetry and verse". Featuring oral-based poetics, performance poetry and Creole verse, the issue questioned traditional divisions between words and music, literature and street culture, textuality and orality, antagonizing standard literary formats and in turn provoking major debates and discussions in Caribbean literary circles.

Between 1970 and 1979, fifteen issues of Savacou were published. The journal ceased publication in 1980 with issue 15.

The name Savacou also appears as a publishing imprint.

This article uses text from the Chimurengal Library under the GFDL

== See also ==
- Bim
- Kyk-Over-Al
