= Savacou (sculpture) =

Sculpture of a bird by Ronald Moody

- Artist: Ronald Moody
- Year: 1964
- Type: sculpture
- Medium: Aluminium
- Dimensions: 213 cm (84 in)
- Location: University of the West Indies; Mona, Jamaica

Savacou is an aluminium sculpture of a stylised bird by the Jamaican sculptor Ronald Moody. It is sited on the campus of the University of the West Indies in Mona, Jamaica.

== Commissioning ==
The sculpture was commissioned by the Epidemiological Research Unit in London to be sited in front of the Epidemiological Research Unit on the campus of the University College of the West Indies.

Extensive discussions on the commission took place between Moody, Professor A. L. Cochrane, director of the London unit, and Dr W. E. Miall, director of the Mona research unit. The statue was a gift from Cochrane to the Unit, rather than a gift to Miall in order to generate more press attention.

Moody was unaware of any surviving statues of the god Savacou and initially had planned to depict the god in the form of a heron with a similar pointy-headed look to other ritual bird depictions that had survived; but, having considered the proposed site, the design was changed to that of a larger abstract parrot-shape with alterations to the legs and base.

At the time of the commission Moody had been interested in his West Indian background and was working in concrete, but subsequent to producing Savacou he changed medium. Savacou is the most famous work from this period of his career. Early in the design process the work was rejected by the Royal Academy. A maquette of the sculpture was made in 1963 and the sculpture cast in the summer of 1964. The cast sculpture was first exhibited in August and September 1964 on the lawn of the Commonwealth Institute, generating radio, television and filmed coverage. The statue was shipped to Jamaica but was damaged in transit and required repair before siting.

== Description ==
The sculpture depicts the bird incarnation of Savacou (from the Carib word Sawaku meaning heron), the god of storms and thunder who 'blows the lightning through a great reed'. The design is an abstract parrot shape with the shape of the bird's comb hinting at the gods later metamorphosis into a star. The sculpture reflects and attempts to create pride in Taino traditions.

The design of the sculpture was later adapted as Carib War Bird for the flyleaf of the journal Savacou.

== See also ==
- Photograph of Moody with the statue in front of the Commonwealth Institute
