= Faustin Charles =

Trinidadian-British author, poet and storyteller (born 1944)

- Born: 15 September 1944 (age 81); Toco, Trinidad
- Education: University of Kent at Canterbury
- Occupations: Author, poet and storyteller
- Notable work: The Selfish Crocodile
- Website: faustincharles.com

Faustin Charles (born 15 September 1944) is a Trinidad-born writer and storyteller, who moved to Britain in the 1960s. He is the author of novels, poetry and short stories, his work featuring in major anthologies of Caribbean writing. He published his first collection of poems in 1969. He is best known more recently for his children's books, particularly The Selfish Crocodile, which has had sales of more than 100,000 copies.

== Biography ==
Faustin Charles was born on 15 September 1944 in Toco, Trinidad. Wanting to be a writer since childhood, inspired by the storytelling of his maternal grandmother, Charles travelled to England after his schooling in Trinidad, to undertake further studies. According to his own summary of the following years: "Before I began my studies, I worked in the Post Office and was also a Stock Keeper at a store in London and a Hardware Factory in Hertfordshire. I published my first book of poetry. Then I got married and my second book of poetry was published. My first child was born, then I entered the University of Kent at Canterbury where I studied English with African and Caribbean Studies."

In addition to publishing many books for children and adults over the subsequent years, Charles has had a career as a sought-after storyteller and reader, visiting schools and colleges throughout the United Kingdom, as well as lecturing, and among the variety of engagements he has undertaken are as a creative writing fellowship at Warwick University and writer-in-residence at Wormwood Scrubs.

His writing has appeared in notable anthologies, including News for Babylon (edited by James Berry, 1984) and The New British Poetry (1988, edited by Gillian Allnutt, Fred D'Aguiar, Ken Edwards and Eric Mottram). In 2002, the volume Festival of Flight: Free yourselves and others featured Charles among 17 celebrated international names, including Benjamin Zephaniah, Ben Okri, Imtiaz Dharker and Grace Nichols, contributing poetry in aid of Anti-Slavery International. In the words of Kamau Brathwaite, "Faustin Charles offers an utterance of his own, which promises to push the frontier of West Indian expression in poetry one understanding further on", and Edward Lucie-Smith has said: "Faustin Charles' work seems to me outstandingly successful in capturing certain essentially West Indian qualities – the mixture of European and African cultures, of the bizarre and the beautiful, the grotesque and the sinister. The 'climate of the heart', which West Indians know of but cannot always communicate, speaks clearly and delicately in his work."

Charles's poem "Viv"—for cicketer Vivian Richards—featured in the London Underground project Poems on the Underground.

== Bibliography ==
- The Expatriate: Poems 1963–1968 (Brookside Press, 1969, ISBN 0851730000); poetry
- Crab Track (Brookside Press, 1973, ISBN 0851730019); poetry
- Signposts of the Jumbie (Bogle-L'Ouverture Publications, 1981); novel
- The Black Magic Man of Brixton (Karnak House, 1985, ISBN 0907015107); novel
- Tales from the West Indies (W. H. Allen, 1985, ISBN 0426201906); short stories
- Days and Nights in the Magic Forest (Bogle-L'Ouverture Publications, 1986); poetry
- Anancy's Day of Cricket (1986); children's
- A Caribbean Counting Book, illustrated by Roberta Arenson (Barefoot Books, 1997, ISBN 978-1901223866), children's
- Once Upon an Animal, illustrated by Jill Newton (Bloomsbury Publishing, 1998, ISBN 978-0747538653)
- Teacher Alligator, illustrated by David Wojtowycz (Bloomsbury Publishing, 2000, ISBN 0747547602)
- The Selfish Crocodile, illustrated by Michael Terry (Bloomsbury Publishing, 2002, ISBN 9780747560685), children's
- Children of the Morning: New and Selected Poems (Peepal Tree Press, 2008, ISBN 978-1900715980)
- A Caribbean Vampire in London (Glom Publications, 2017, ISBN 978-1910648001); novel
- The Man Who Loved Stephen King (O. Taylor New Writing, 2017, ISBN 9781526207142)
- Stephen's Song - Poets of Trinidad & Tobago 6 (Cane Arrow Press, 2023, ISBN 9780992938840)
- Jumbie Stole the Innocence (Cane Arrow Press, 2024, ISBN 9780992938871)
