= The Caribbean Artists Movement =

Cultural initiative (1966–c. 1972)

- Date: 1966–c.1972
- Location: London, England
- Also known as: CAM
- Participants: James Berry; Pearl Connor-Mogotsi; Paul Dash; Stuart Hall; Wilson Harris; Donald Hinds; C. L. R. James; Linton Kwesi Johnson; Evan Jones; Errol Lloyd; Marc Matthews; Marina Ama Omowale Maxwell; Althea McNish; Ronald Moody; Horace Ové; Orlando Patterson; Kenneth Ramchand; Gordon Rohlehr; Ivan Van Sertima; Anne Walmsley; Aubrey Williams
- Outcome: Works by Caribbean writers, visual artists, poets, dramatists, film makers, actors and musicians
- Founders: Kamau Brathwaite; John La Rose; Andrew Salkey

The Caribbean Artists Movement (CAM) was an influential cultural initiative, begun in London, England, in 1966 and active until about 1972, that focused on the works being produced by Caribbean writers, visual artists, poets, dramatists, film makers, actors and musicians. The key people involved in setting up CAM were Kamau Brathwaite, John La Rose and Andrew Salkey. As Angela Cobbinah has written, "the movement had an enormous impact on Caribbean arts in Britain. In its intense five-year existence it set the dominant artistic trends, at the same time forging a bridge between West Indian migrants and those who came to be known as black Britons."

== History ==
In 1968, Brathwaite wrote about CAM's origins, dating them back to a small informal meeting held on 19 December 1966 in his London flat in Mecklenburgh Square (although Louis James suggests that the "seed ideas of what was to become CAM were germinating in Brathwaite's activities at Mona in the previous decade"):

What was to become the Caribbean Artists Movement (CAM) started in December 1966 in my Bloomsbury basement flat. I had recently arrived from the Caribbean on study leave to Britain, and as a writer myself, wanted, quite naturally, to get in touch with as many Caribbean artists as possible. But where were they? The novelists' books were being regularly published; at the Commonwealth Arts Festival I had seen work by a few painters, designers and sculptors from the Caribbean; but no one seemed to know how to get in touch with them. In addition it seemed to me that our West Indian artists were not participating significantly in the cultural life of the country that had become their home.

Since 1950, nearly every West Indian novelist worth the name had come to London and more than a hundred books had come from their typewriters and pens. But despite this, the British public didn't seem to be very much aware of the nature and value of this contribution.

[...] This situation, it seemed to me, was something to be deplored. The isolation of West Indian writers from each other and from the society in which they lived could eventually only stultify development and could do nothing to contribute to perhaps the most important problem of our times – the problem of the future of race relations in Britain.

The BBC radio programme Caribbean Voices, to which Brathwaite was also a contributor, is considered a precursor of CAM.

The journal Savacou (1970–1980) was started as a platform for CAM, connecting its activities in Britain, the Caribbean region and the African diaspora, and elsewhere internationally. La Rose began selling and publishing books, under the name New Beacon Books, which addressed the demand for material that was stimulated by the formation of CAM.

Other notable artists and intellectuals associated with CAM include Evan Jones, C. L. R. James, Stuart Hall, Wilson Harris, Kenneth Ramchand, Ronald Moody, Aubrey Williams, Gordon Rohlehr, Christopher Laird, Louis James, Clifton Campbell, Orlando Patterson, Ivan Van Sertima, Althea McNish, Donald Hinds, James Berry, Errol Lloyd and Anne Walmsley. Linton Kwesi Johnson is among a younger generation of Caribbean writers to have been a member of CAM during the early 1970s.

CAM is acknowledged as being particularly significant in helping to "spark interest in the work of Britain's artists of color". The first CAM conference was held in September 1967 in London, and a subsequent conference at the University of Kent in 1969.

The work of CAM members was brought to the public eye by the BBC in a special Caribbean edition of the magazine programme Full House, introduced by Joe Melia and transmitted on 3 February 1973, in which the work of writers, musicians and film-makers was presented in a studio setting of visual artists' work, brought together by La Rose, Horace Ové and others, with studio designs by McNish.
