= Social death =

Condition of not being accepted as human by society

Social death, sometimes referred to as social suicide, is an extreme social rejection or disenfranchisement of someone by the wider society. It refers to when the targeted people are treated as if they are dead or non-existent. It is used by sociologists such as Orlando Patterson and Zygmunt Bauman, and historians of slavery and the Holocaust, to describe the part played by governmental and social segregation in that process. Social death is defined by "three aspects: a loss of social identity, a loss of social connectedness and losses associated with disintegration of the body."

Examples of social death are:

- Racial and gender exclusion, persecution, slavery, and apartheid.
- Governments can exclude individuals or groups from society. Examples: Protestant minority groups in early modern Europe; ostracism in Ancient Athens; Dalits in India; criminals; prostitutes, and outlaws.
- Institutionalization and segregation of those labeled with a mental illness.

== Slavery and Social Death ==
The chief proponent of the relationship between social death and slavery is Orlando Patterson, who states his findings in his 1982 book, Slavery and Social Death: A Comparative Study. Patterson first defines slavery as "one of the most extreme forms of the relation of domination, approaching the limits of total power from the viewpoint of the master, and of total powerlessness from the viewpoint of the slave." Social death had both internal and external effects on enslaved people, changing their views of themselves and the way they were regarded by society. Slavery and social death can be linked in all civilizations where slavery existed, including China, Rome, Africa, Byzantium, Greece, Europe, and the Americas.

The beginning of social death comes from the initial enslavement process, which would most likely come from capture during a battle. A captive would be spared from death and created a slave, although this was a conditional commutation since death was only suspended as long as the slave submitted to his powerlessness. This pardon from death was replaced with social death, which would manifest both physically and psychologically.

Externally, slaves would undergo the loss of their identities through such practices as replacing their names, being branded to indicate their social condition, given a specific dress code that further established them as slaves to the public, castration, and having their heads shaved. Each of these acts alienated the slaves from their previous identities and symbolized their loss of freedom and power and their total dependency on their master’s will. The psychological process of social death included the effect of rejection as a member of society and becoming genealogically isolated through the loss of heritage and the right to pass on their ancestry to their children. In fact, all social bonds were seen as illegitimate unless they were validated by the master (however, he also mentions that "a large number of works have demonstrated that slaves in both ancient and modern times had strong social ties among themselves", those ties being "informal"). Enslaved people were denied an independent social structure and were not even deemed fully human, as they were only seen as a representation of their master and had no honor or power of their own. The degree to which these practices took place was based on the two modes of social death, intrusive and extrusive. In the intrusive mode, rituals were developed for the incorporation of an external enemy into the culture as a slave. In the extrusive mode, traditions evolved for including those who have "fallen into slavery" from within society into the slave status. Both of these modes provided a process for the institutionalization of socially dead individuals.

Power played an essential role in the relationship between a slave and master, and violence was often deemed a necessary component of slavery. A slave was seen to have no worth. They had no name of their own and no honor. Instead, their worth and honor was transferred to the master and gave him an elevated social status among his peers. Violence within the relationship was considered essential because of the low motivation of the enslaved people, and it was also a factor in creating social death and exercising power over the slaves. Whipping was not only a method of punishment but also a consciously chosen symbolic device to remind slaves of their status. This physical violence had other psychological effects as well, gradually creating an attitude of self-blame and an acknowledgement of the complete control that a master had. Interviews with former American slaves included statements such as "slaves get the masters they deserve" and "I was so bad I needed the whipping", demonstrating the justification that slaves had no right to expect kindness or compassion because of their status in society and the devastating mental effects from social death.

These effects demonstrated the expectations of the behavior of a slave who had experienced social death. The individuals viewed as the ultimate slaves, the palace eunuchs from Byzantium and China, were essentially a paradox. These slaves were trusted by emperors and could be extremely influential. They were expected to be loyal, brave, and obedient, yet they were still considered low and debased and were shunned by society.

While Orlando Patterson gives the most extensive study on slavery and social death, he has several critics of his analysis. Those who reviewed the book disliked his refusal to define slaves as property because other groups could fit this definition as well, including women and children. Patterson also does not compare the treatment of slaves to other socially marginalized groups, such as prostitutes, criminals, and indentured servants. The third critique given about Patterson’s book is the lack of primary sources. Commentators noted that the argument in Slavery and Social Death would have been much stronger had Patterson utilized testimony from enslaved people of their views and meanings of honor, domination, and community.

In 2018, Orlando Patterson published an updated preface to Slavery and Social Death: A Comparative Study that reflexively addresses the text’s original arguments and provides additional information about the concept of social death. In the new preface, Patterson assesses social death as a “slaveholder ideology,” provides more theoretical clarification as to how the text was and should be situated within different disciplinary conversations, and addresses the validity of a wide range of external critiques relevant to fields like Black Studies, Genocide Studies, and Holocaust Studies among others. He begins by reiterating the aim and scope of his comparative analysis in 1982: "My strategy was to examine the internal dynamics and meanings of this special human relation of domination and its consequences for the parties involved—slaveholder, enslaved, freed, and those never enslaved—and the ways in which this relationship was generative of, and dynamically related to, the institutional process of manumission." Speaking back to historians who’ve engaged with social death as merely a slaveholder ideology, he adds a correction to explain that “slaves did not internalize this ideology; rather, they saw through it” in ways that influenced practices of resistance and rebellion enacted to thwart said overarching power. Additionally, he explicitly states that “social death was not a theory I imposed upon the historical realities of slavery,” which provides a chance to re-evaluate Patterson's conceptual relationship to the original archives used in Slavery and Social Death.

Importantly, the updated preface speaks back to the growing "afro-pessimist" movement of black critical theory which has adopted the concept of social death to contend with the lingering effects of the Atlantic slave trade. Although Patterson refers to this movement as "humanist intellectualism," afro-pessmimist techniques most explicitly articulated by scholars like Frank B. Wilderson III, Selamawit D. Terrefe, Jared Sexton, and Saidiya Hartman to name a few position blackness in conversation with social death to interrogate the profound consequences of anti-black racism and violence on civil society. Still, there remains a question around whether “social death” accurately describes the conditions of contemporary anti-blackness and he addresses this clearly in the updated preface. Although Patterson takes time to agree with the major tenets of afro-pessimist critique he states that “At the national level, however, America ceased being a neoslavery nation with the successes of the civil rights movement: blacks are now incorporated and play major roles in its mainstream culture, national political life, and military, the election of Barack Obama to the presidency being only the culmination of this top-down process of disalienation.” Patterson’s relationship to afro-pessimism, articulated in the updated preface and other interviews on the topic, illuminates potential limits of social death and gives a more clear outline of his original conception of the term in 1982.

== Other definitions ==
In the context of health, social death—when the ailing person no longer has the consciousness to communicate with others—can occur. Social death occurs during the progression of Alzheimer's disease and to patients rendered unconscious through palliative sedation (a type of end-of-life care) to reduce pain before an imminent death.

Social death can also be an impact of ageism. Elderly people are isolated from other age groups due to health issues (such as during the COVID-19 pandemic) and their physical deaths are viewed as less tragic than others.

Employees who retire from their careers can experience another example of social death because of their removal from the daily work lives of co-workers, with retirement representing a form of isolation for those without external social supports.

Male and female survivors of sexual assault have also been described as suffering stigma and disconnection from their societies, as forms of "social death."

== See also ==
- Social Murder - Death by social, political, or economic systems.
- Civil death – Loss of all or almost all civil rights
- Disengagement theory – Theory of aging
- Enemy of the people – Designation for political opponents of ruling power
- Excommunication – Censure used to deprive, suspend, or limit membership in a religious community
- Exile – Event by which a person is forced away from home
- Herem (censure) – Highest ecclesiastical censure in the Jewish community
- Imprisonment – Restraint of a person's liberty by judicial or other detention
- Ostracism – Democratic procedure for expelling citizens
- Shunning – Act of social rejection, or emotional distance
- Social determinants of health – Economic and social conditions that influence differences in health status
- Social determinants of health in poverty – Factors that affect impoverished populations' health and health inequality
- Social determinants of mental health – Societal problems that disrupt mental health
- Social exclusion – Form of social disadvantage and relegation to the fringe of society
- Victimology – Study of victimization
