= News for Babylon =

1984 anthology edited by James Berry

News for Babylon: The Chatto Book of Westindian-British Poetry
- Editor: James Berry
- Language: English
- Publisher: Chatto & Windus
- Publication date: 1984; 42 years ago
- Publication place: United Kingdom
- Pages: xxvii, 212
- ISBN: 9780701127961
- OCLC: 12721835

News for Babylon: The Chatto Book of Westindian-British Poetry was a 1984 anthology of West Indian and black British poetry, edited by Jamaican poet James Berry and published in London by Chatto & Windus. The anthology included work by Wilson Harris, Faustin Charles, Rudolph Kizerman, Valerie Bloom, John Agard, Fred D'Aguiar, Samuel Selvon, E. A. Markham, Grace Nichols, Linton Kwesi Johnson, Archie Pool and Benjamin Zephaniah. A Poetry Review reviewer commented on the way that the language seemed "to slip unselfconsciously from Creole to standard English between or within poems, creating a dialogue or polyphony of discourses in which the unequal encounter of two cultures is directly enacted."

The anthology quickly sold out. Though never reissued, it "remains a standard text in educational institutions teaching colonial and post-colonial literature".
