= Marina Ama Omowale Maxwell =

Trinidadian playwright, performer, poet and novelist

- Born: Marina Jesslyn Crichlow; November 10, 1934; San Fernando, Trinidad and Tobago
- Died: September 30, 2024 (age 89); Curepe, Trinidad Trinidad and Tobago
- Other name: Marina Maxwell
- Education: University of the West Indies; Michigan State University
- Occupations: Playwright, performer, poet, novelist, activist, educator
- Notable work: Play Mas; About our own business; Chopstix in Mauby; Decades to Ama
- Spouse: John William Maxwell 1934-2010 (divorced)
- Children: 1
- Parent(s): Felix Augustus Crichlow, MD, Beryl Archbald Crichlow,

Marina Ama Omowale Maxwell, also known as Marina Maxwell was a Trinidadian playwright, performer, poet and novelist. She was associated with the Caribbean Artists Movement in London in the late 1960s, working with Edward Kamau Brathwaite, while back in the Caribbean she was responsible for developing the experimental Yard Theatre, which was "an attempt to place West Indian theatre in the life of the people [...] to find it in the yards where people live and are." The concept of "yard theatre" was considered revolutionary, according to Brathwaite, because it not only "rejected/ignored... traditional/ colonial Euro-American theatre," it also "provided a viable and creative alternative."

== Biography ==
Born in San Fernando, on November 10, 1934, she gained a BA and MSc (Sociology) at UWI Mona and St. Augustine, and an MA at Michigan State University She received a Phd from UWI St Augustine.

In London during the 1960s, she was associated with the Caribbean Artists Movement (CAM), of which she was a former secretary, and participated in 1967 in the CAM symposium entitled "West Indian Theatre" at the West Indian Students' Centre in London. Back in the Caribbean, she established the Yard Theatre, rejecting existing theatrical norms and venues and instead staging plays in back yards in Kingston, Jamaica. Maxwell's Yard Theatre has been described as "one of the most significant experiments in relocating theatre performance to more culturally appropriate sites. Running for several years in the late 1960s and early 1970s, the Yard Theatre—literally a yard rather than a building—addressed itself to the people of the street, the poorer classes who had no access to a formal theatre often segregated along the lines of race and class."

Her 1968 drama Play Mas′ — one of several Carnival-based plays dating from around that time, including Lennox Brown's Devil Mas′ (1971), Ronald Amoroso's The Master of Carnival (1974) and Mustapha Matura's Rum and Coca Cola (1976), with other productions in the 1980s and '90s by Earl Lovelace, Derek Walcott and Rawle Gibbons similarly drawing on local creative resources — exemplified a belief expressed in her 1970 article "Towards a Revolution in the Arts", in the journal Savacou: "We have only to look around us and listen....[W]e only have to listen across the Caribbean, on the streets, in the Sound System yards, in the Calypso tents, in the rejection statements of the Rastafari--and we can know that we are in the presence of our own gods." She called on the middle-class artists to "stop looking back over their shoulders in some misty distance at Shakespeare, at pleasing the European–oriented audiences with well-modulated verse and slick theatre, and (to) address themselves to experimenting with their own thing, unafraid to fail."

Maxwell was the author of several books of poetry, fiction and non-fiction, also contributing articles and reviews to various publications.

She served as president of the Writers' Union of Trinidad and Tobago (WUTT), which she founded in 1980.

== Selected writings ==
- "Towards a Revolution in the Arts", Savacou 2 (September 1970), pp. 19–32.
- About our own business, Drum Mountain Publications, 1981
- Chopstix in Mauby: A Novel of Magical Realism, Peepal Tree Press, 1997, ISBN 978-0948833960
- Decades to Ama (poetry), Peepal Tree Press, 2005, ISBN 978-1845230173
- The 8th Octave: A Magical Realism/real Maravilloso Novel, Arima, Trinidad and Tobago: Drum Mountain Publications of Omnamedia Productions, 2012
