= Myra Barrs =

British educationist and literacy researcher

- Born: Myra Angela Barrs; 6 December 1939; Coventry, England
- Died: 24 October 2023 (aged 83)
- Education: University of Birmingham; Homerton College, Cambridge
- Occupations: Educationist, literacy researcher, writer
- Employer(s): Centre for Literacy in Primary Education; UCL Institute of Education
- Known for: Literacy education Primary Language Record

Myra Angela Barrs (6 December 1939 – 24 October 2023) was a British educationist, literacy researcher, and writer. She was known for her work on children's language and literacy, especially through the Centre for Literacy in Primary Education (formerly the Centre for Language in Primary Education), where she helped develop the Primary Language Record. She also wrote on poetry, drama, storytelling, and the educational thought of Lev Vygotsky.

== Early life and education ==
Barrs was born in Coventry to Gladys Liggins, who had been a cinema pianist in the silent film era, and Thomas Barrs, an aircraft toolmaker. She attended grammar school and studied French at the University of Birmingham. She then trained as a teacher at Homerton College, Cambridge, after which she taught English at a school in Cambridge and at a sixth-form college in Chelmsford, Essex. Later, she joined Camden School for Girls as the head of English.

== Career ==
In the early 1970s, Barrs worked as an editor at Penguin Education before joining St Augustine's Secondary School in Kilburn as head of English. From 1976 to 1981, she served as an English adviser in the London Borough of Brent, where she promoted the use of writers, poets and drama practitioners in schools and supported experimental approaches to language teaching.

By 1985, Barrs had become director of the Centre for Language in Primary Education, later known as the Centre for Literacy in Primary Education, where she led the development of the Primary Language Record.

In 2001, Barrs was inducted into the International Reading Association's Reading Hall of Fame.

In 2003, Barrs established a national award for poetry books written for children. The prize later became known as the CLiPPA.

In later years, Barrs was an Honorary Senior Research Associate at the UCL Institute of Education. In 2022, she delivered the Harold Rosen Memorial Lecture at UCL on the subject of her book Vygotsky the Teacher.

== Personal life ==
In 1974, Barrs married Nigel Tully, which ended in divorce in 1978. She later lived with her partner James Berry, until his death in 2017. Barrs died of cancer on 24 October 2023, aged 83.

== Selected works ==
- The Reading Book (1991)
- The Primary Language Record: Handbook for Teachers (1994)
- The Reader in the Writer: The Links Between the Study of Literature and Writing Development at Key Stage 2 (with Valerie Cork, 2001)
- Making Poetry Happen: Transforming the Poetry Classroom (editor, 2015)
- Vygotsky the Teacher: A Companion to his Psychology for Teachers and Other Practitioners (2022)
- The Vygotsky Anthology: A Selection from His Key Writings (with John Richmond, 2024)
