= Escape to An Autumn Pavement =

1960 novel by Andrew Salkey

Escape to An Autumn Pavement is the second novel of Jamaican writer and journalist Andrew Salkey. It was first published in 1960, and narrates main character Johnnie Sobert's pursuit of cultural belonging. The novel was re-issued in 2009 as a Peepal Tree Caribbean Classic with an introduction by Thomas Glave, who foregrounds the novel's bold exploration of sexuality.

Though Salkey is likely better remembered for his contributions to literary culture than for his own writing, Escape to An Autumn Pavement has been discussed as an important contribution to both postcolonial and queer literary studies, with the interrelation of Johnnie's migrant and queer identities making him significant to theorists from both of these backgrounds.

== Plot ==
Johnnie, a Jamaican exile, spends the novel immersing himself in the bohemian scene found in Soho as he struggles with his cultural belonging and identity. While living in a bedsit in Hempstead, he engages in an unfulfilling affair with his white landlady Fiona, and attraction to his white gay friend Dick, with each making him question where his true desires lie.

== Major themes ==
=== Identity and Race ===
Johnnie's identity is a threat to the post-war idea of family as straight and white. His position as a migrant, and as someone who is mixed-race poses him as an outsider despite being inside the home. Houlden describes Johnnie's character as being an 'insider-outsider', a term that reflects his presence physically but not psychologically. She goes on to explain how the idea of 'home' he seems to be chasing is more than a physical space of his own, but psychological freedom. In his 'aimless' journey for freedom, he leaves Jamaica behind and embraces the london life, but it appears his own struggle to find identity occupies his mind. In his brief interaction with some older Jamaican men, we see how homosexuality was not welcomed in the Caribbean diaspora community, and he is accused of 'selling himself to the other side'. Johnnie seems to reject this community anyways, but it feels like he's rejecting them before they can reject him. This isolation leads to his alienation from those around him, as he doesn't seem to fit in anywhere.

== Masculinity ==
Like the aforementioned themes, masculinity ties into themes of race and identity, as both Boxill and Tricker agree. It is his alienation and unease surrounding his presence in London and in the relationships he finds himself in, that reveal Johnnie's insecurity surrounding his masculinity and his emasculation. Tricker relates this to Johnnie's having grown up without a father, noting that through his association of his father and a hurricane, "Johnnie underlines the threat of domination he continuously poses". The impact of Johnnie's father is what causes the guilt surrounding his masculinity and informs his relationships with love, relationships and, more broadly, his lifestyle. He lives in both contrast and imitation of his father's values. To escape the idea of his father, Johnnie must escape Jamaica. His attitude to his own racial identity is informed by a rejection of how his father was, and how his mother internalizes racist ideas, both suggesting Britain has a gentlemanly nature that, in their eyes, cannot be found as easily at home.
