= Ronald Moody =

Jamaican-British sculptor (1900–1984)

- Moody at his studio in Montparnasse, Paris, 1938
- Born: Ronald Clive Moody; 12 August 1900; Kingston, Colony of Jamaica, British Empire
- Died: 6 February 1984 (aged 83); London, England
- Resting place: Galveston Memorial Park
- Known for: Sculpture
- Notable work: Wohin (1934); Johanaan (1936); Midonz (1937); Savacou (1964)
- Movement: Caribbean Artists Movement

Ronald Moody (12 August 1900 – 6 February 1984) was a Jamaican-born sculptor, specialising in wood carvings. His work features in collections including the National Portrait Gallery and Tate Britain in London, as well as the National Gallery of Jamaica. He was the brother of anti-racist campaigner Harold Moody and award-winning physiologist Ludlow Moody.

== Biography ==
Ronald Clive Moody was born in 1900 in Kingston, Jamaica, into a well-off professional family. He attended Calabar College, Jamaica, moving to England in 1923 to study dentistry at King's College London, obtaining his degree in 1930. In London, he was inspired by the British Museum's collection of non-Western art and decided to become a sculptor. Early experiments with clay led him to teach himself how to carve. He produced his first carved figure in oak wood. Entitled Wohin (meaning in German "where to?”, the name of a song by Schubert), that sculpture was bought by Marie Seton in 1935.

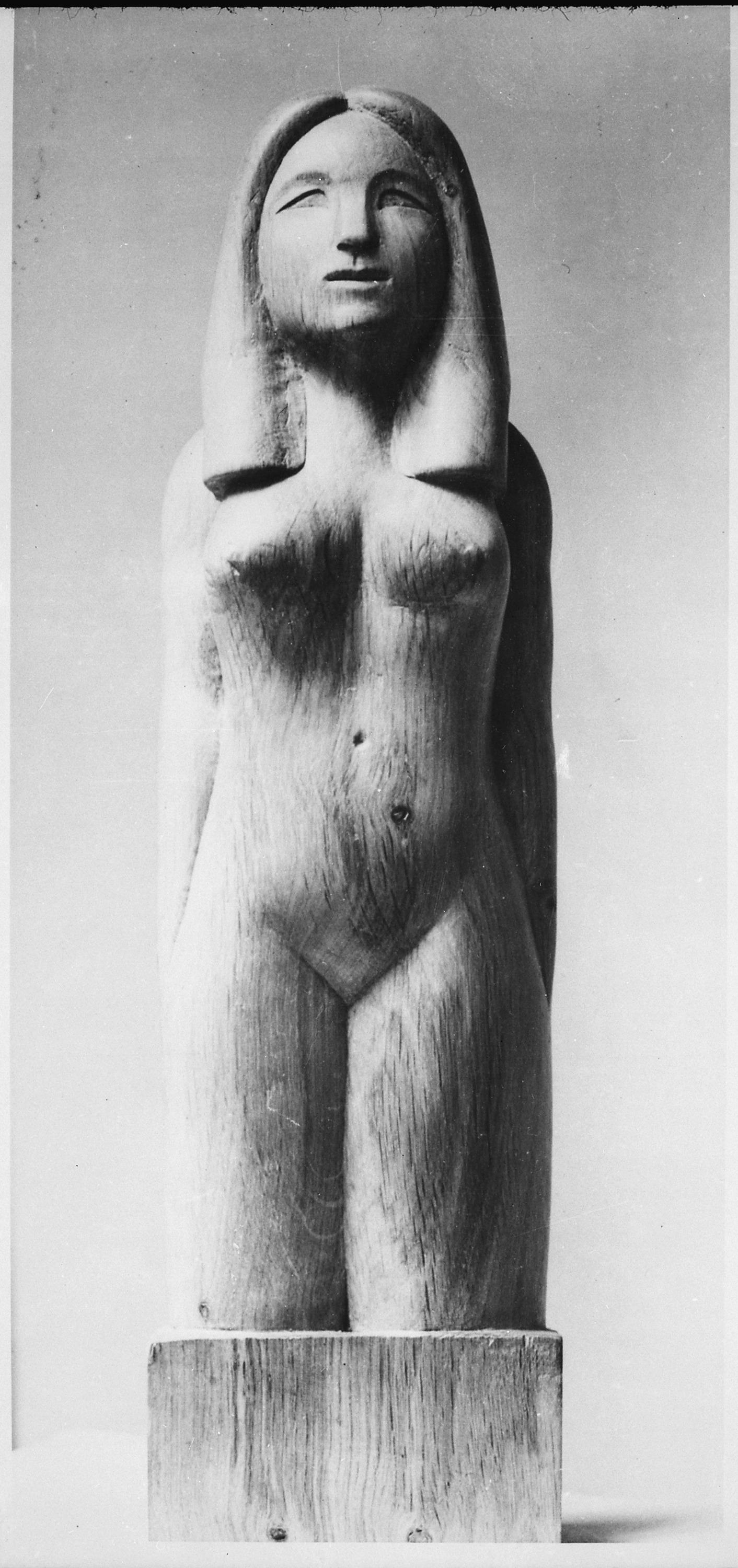
Annie (1938)

Among Moody's most famous works from this period was his great female head, Midonz (1937), which he described as "the goddess of transmutation". By the late 1930s, he had accumulated an impressive collection of work and had a solo show in Paris, France. The success of the show encouraged him to move to Paris in 1938. That year, 12 major sculptures were sent to the Harmon Foundation in the United States to be included in exhibitions at the Baltimore Museum of Art and the Dallas Museum of Art. Moody's success in France was cut short by the onset of the Second World War. In 1940, two days before Paris fell to the Germans, he was forced to flee the city, abandoning his sculptures. (They were retrieved after the war, along with the works that had been sent to the US for exhibition.)

After having escaped from Paris, Moody travelled through occupied France, across the Pyrenees into Spain, and eventually arrived back in England in October 1941. His Paris success followed him to London, where he resumed his work after the war and had a one-man show in May 1946 at the Arcade Gallery, off Bond Street. In 1946 he cast a bronze head of his eldest brother Harold Moody (1882–1947, founder of the League of Coloured Peoples).

From 1950 until the early 1960s regular London exhibitions brought Ronald Moody a growing presence on the British art scene. In 1964 he created a sculpture called Savacou for the University of the West Indies (UWI), a stylised depiction of a bird, which is sited on the UWI campus at Mona, Jamaica. He is among those artists associated with the Caribbean Artists Movement (CAM) that was founded in London (1966–72).

Moody died in London in 1984, aged 83. His niece Cynthia Moody, who inherited his estate, thereafter devoted herself to documenting and promoting her uncle's work.

== Honours and legacy ==
In 1977 Moody was given the Jamaican Musgrave Gold Medal, and in 1980 the Centenary Medal by the Institute of Jamaica, although no major exhibitions of his work took place on his native island during his lifetime.

In 2000 the first substantial exhibition of his work took place at the National Gallery of Jamaica. His work featured in the exhibition No Colour Bar: Black British Art in Action 1960–1990 held at the Guildhall Art Gallery, London, from 10 July 2015 to 24 January 2016.

Moody crater on Mercury was named after him in November 2008.

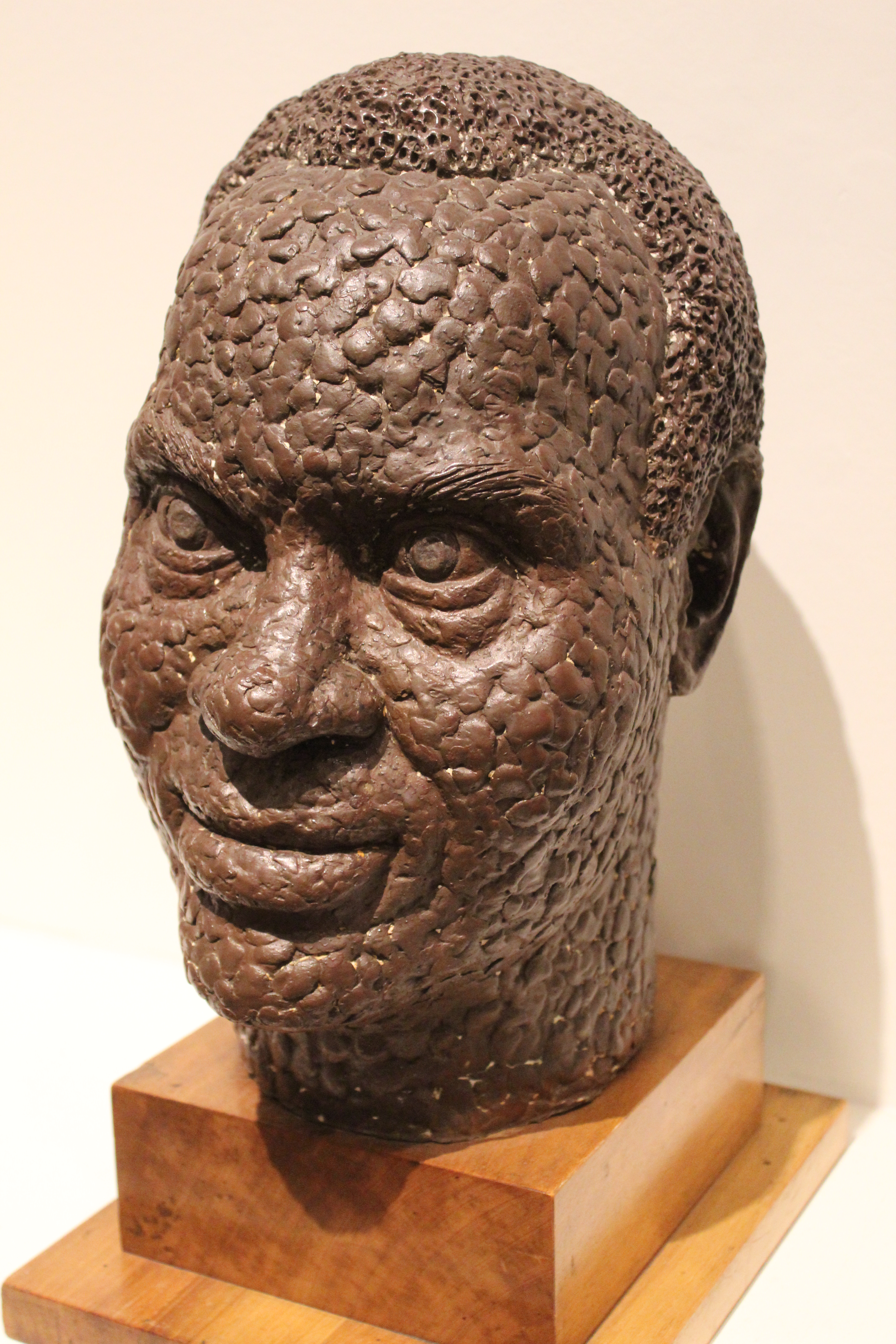
Paul Robeson, 1968

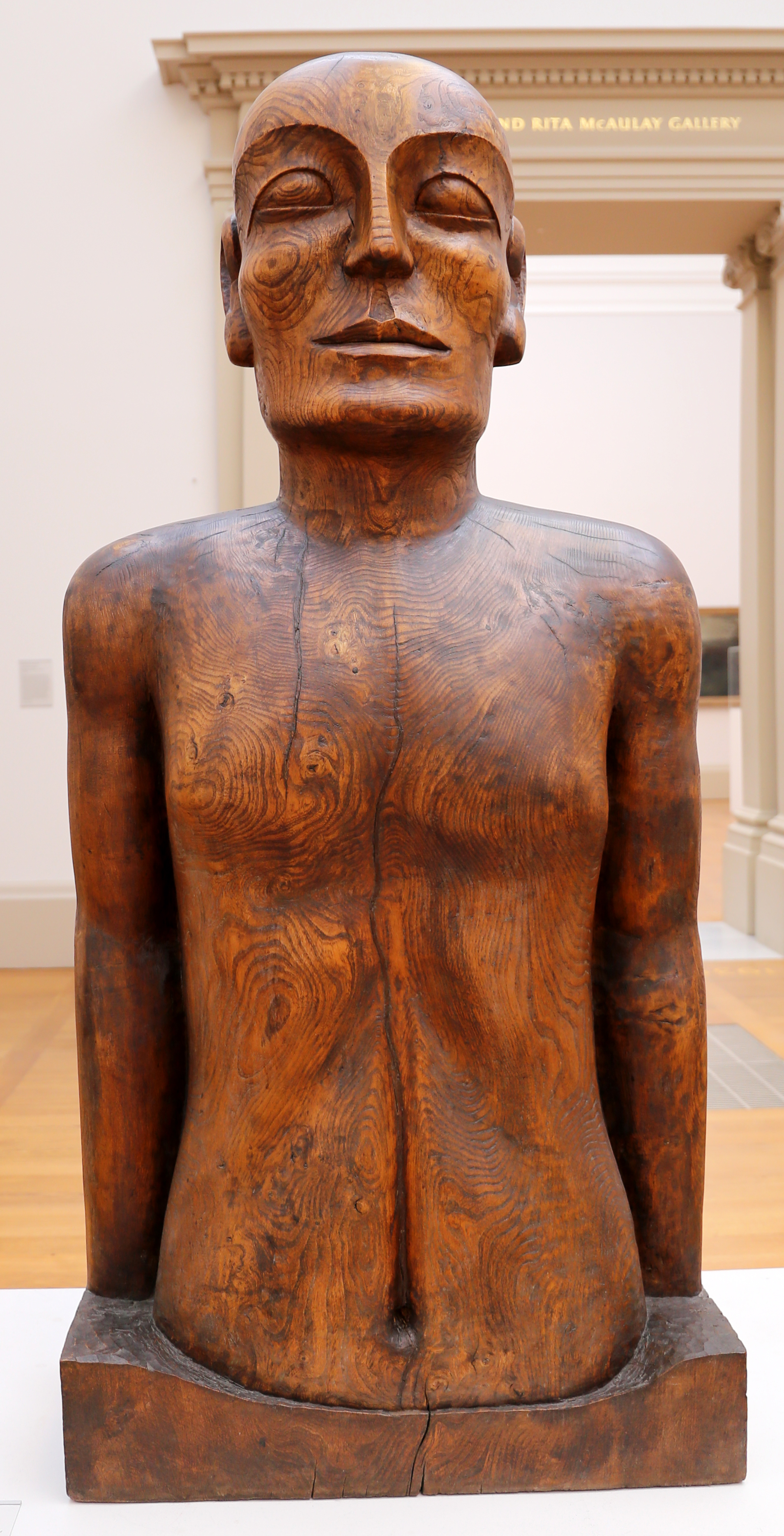
Johanaan, 1936

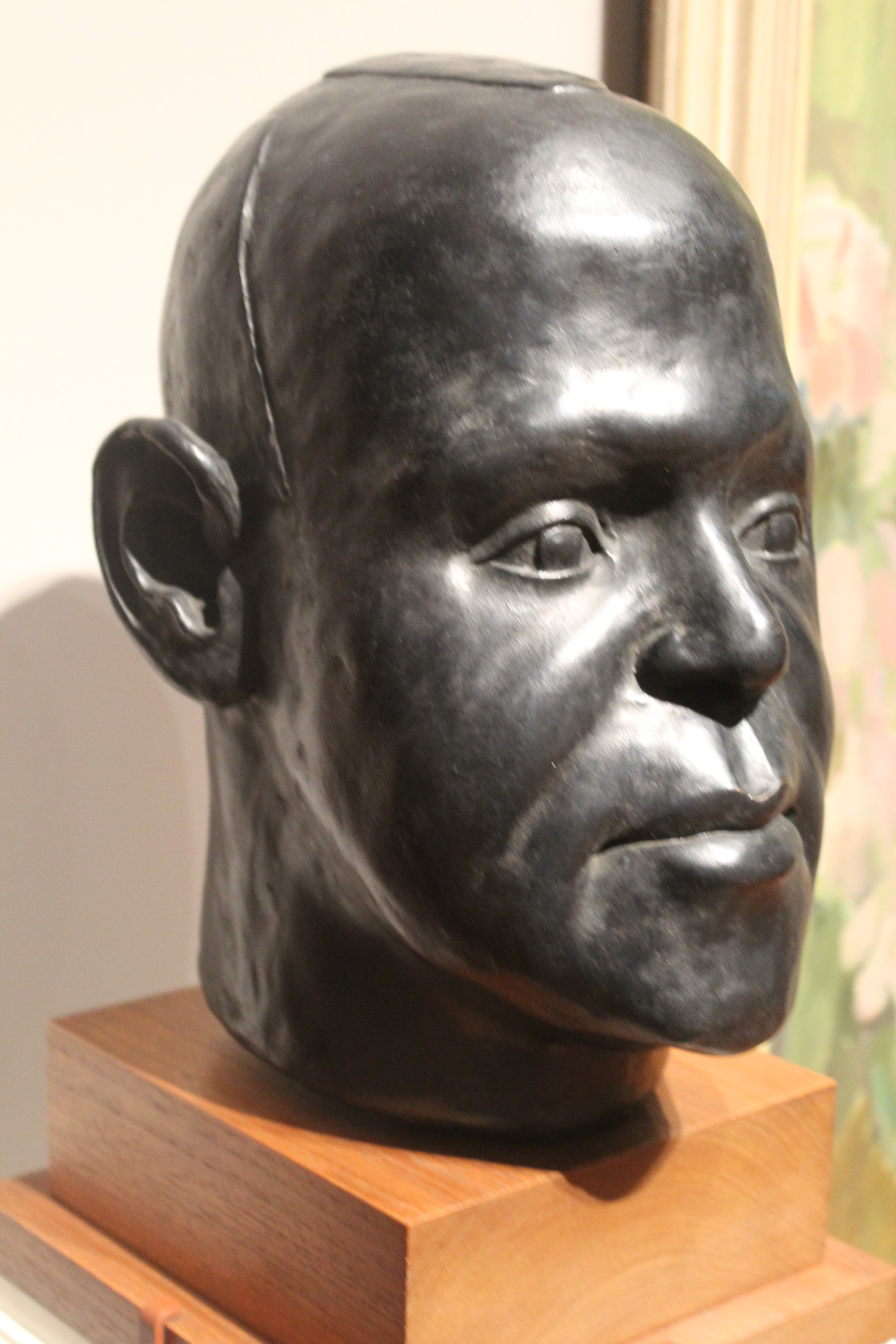
Harold Moody, modelled 1946, cast 1997

== Selected works ==
- Wohin, 1934
- Johanaan (Peace), 1936
- Midonz (Goddess of Transmutation), 1937
- Tacet, 1938
- Sleeper Mask, 1943
- Dr Harold Moody, 1946
- Savacou, 1964
- Time Hiroshima, 1967
- Paul Robeson, 1968
