= Gordon Rohlehr =

Guyana-born scholar (1942–2023)

- Born: Daniel Frederick Gordon Rohlehr; 20 February 1942; Guyana
- Died: 29 January 2023 (aged 80); Trinidad
- Education: Queen's College; University College of the West Indies
- Occupations: Scholar; literary critic
- Notable work: Calypso and Society in Pre-Independence Trinidad (1989)
- Movement: Caribbean Artists Movement
- Spouse: Betty Ann Rohlehr
- Awards: Henry Swanzy Award, 2014; Chaconia Medal (Silver), 2022

Gordon Rohlehr (20 February 1942 – 29 January 2023) was a Guyana-born scholar and critic of West Indian literature, noted for his study of popular culture in the Caribbean, including oral poetry, calypso and cricket. He pioneered the academic and intellectual study of Calypso, tracing its history over several centuries, writing a landmark work entitled Calypso and Society in Pre-Independence Trinidad (1989), and is considered the world's leading authority on its development.

== Life and career ==
Born in Guyana in 1942, Daniel Frederick Gordon "Bosco" Rohlehr was the third of his parents' seven children. He was educated at Queen's College, Guyana, and at the University College of the West Indies, Mona, Jamaica, graduating in 1964 with a first-class Honours degree in English Literature. He then wrote a doctoral dissertation entitled "Alienation and Commitment in the Works of Joseph Conrad" at Birmingham University (1964–67), before taking up an English Literature appointment in Trinidad at the University of the West Indies (UWI), St Augustine. He designed and taught UWI's first course in West Indian Literature.

Spending 40 years at UWI, St Augustine – he began as Assistant Lecturer in 1968 and achieved a personal Chair by 1985 – he established an international reputation for his ground-breaking work on Caribbean literature, calypso and culture, building an extensive opus that comprises books, hundreds of essays, interviews, lectures and broadcasts. He co-edited, with Stewart Brown and Mervyn Morris, Voiceprint: An Anthology of Oral and Related Poetry from the Caribbean (Harlow: Longman Caribbean, 1989).

Rohlehr had also been Visiting Professor to Harvard University (September–December 1981); the Johns Hopkins University (September–December 1985); Tulane University (January–May 1997); Stephen F. Austin State University (January–May 2000); Miami University Writers’ Workshop (June–July 1995); York University, Toronto (January–February 1996) and Dartmouth College, New Hampshire (June–August 2004).

Rohlehr died on 29 January 2023, at the age of 80.

== Writing ==
Rohlehr is the author of several books on different aspects of Caribbean culture. He has said that his interest on researching and writing about calypso music dates back to his attendance of the Caribbean Artists Movement's second meeting, held in 1967 at the North London flat of Orlando Patterson, when in response to discussion among the likes of Kamau Brathwaite, George Lamming and Aubrey Williams about "the Caribbean aesthetic" Rohlehr was prompted to say: "The way to determine what this aesthetic might be is to look at what Caribbean people have done and to create, through a close dialogue with the material, some way of talking about their achievement and of distinguishing what is peculiarly Caribbean about it, if you employ that method, beginning with the work–Walcott’s poetry, Sparrow’s calypsoes, Selvon's novels–you might then be able to recognise recurring features. If for example, you read Selvon's The Lonely Londoners and short stories alongside Sparrow’s calypsoes you might discover something that was peculiarly Trinidadian in both of these people…..those were not my exact words, of course; only a paraphrase of the sense of what I said. Then someone, one of the big voices, said, 'If this is the way you feel, why don’t you do it?'"

Since then, as Raymond Ramcharitar has noted, "Gordon Rohlehr’s accomplishments in mapping this territory are monumental." In particular, his 1990 book, Calypso and Society in Pre-Independence Trinidad, describing the development of the Trinidad calypso from pre-emancipation times to the late 1950s, is considered a seminal work. His book My Whole Life is Calypso: Essays on Sparrow was launched in August 2015. His memoir Musings, Mazes, Muses, Margins, published in 2020, was longlisted for the OCM Bocas Prize for Caribbean Literature.

== Awards and honours ==
In 1995, Rohlehr received the University of the West Indies (UWI) Vice-Chancellor's Award for Excellence in the combined fields of Teaching, Research, Administration and Public Service.

Rohlehr's retirement from UWI in 2007 was marked by a conference in his honour, "for his sterling contribution to the development of West Indian literary and cultural criticism".

In 2009, Rohlehr was awarded an honorary doctorate from the University of Sheffield.

His life and career are celebrated in a 2013 documentary film entitled Rivers of Sound: Rohlehr’s Life and Works, directed by Jean Antoine-Dunne.

In 2012, Rohlehr was awarded the Nicolás Guillén Outstanding Achievements in Philosophical Literature Award by the Caribbean Philosophical Association.

At the 2014 NGC Bocas Lit Fest, Rohlehr was honoured alongside Professor Kenneth Ramchand with the Henry Swanzy Award for Distinguished Service to Caribbean Letters, which recognises the lifetime achievement of editors, publishers, critics and broadcasters.

The Trinidad and Tobago government awarded Rohlehr the Chaconia Medal (Silver), for his work in Literature, Culture, History and Education, at the National Awards 2022.

== Bibliography ==
- Pathfinder: Black Awakening in "The Arrivants" of Edward Kamau Brathwaite (Tunapuna: College Press, 1981)
- Cultural Resistance and the Guyana State (Casa de las Américas, 1984)
- Calypso and Society in Pre-Independence Trinidad (Port of Spain, 1990; ISBN 978-9768012524)
- My Strangled City and Other Essays (Longman Trinidad, 1992)
- The Shape of That Hurt and Other Essays (Longman Trinidad, 1992)
- A Scuffling of Islands: Essays on Calypso (Lexicon Trinidad Ltd, 2004)
- Transgression, Transition, Transformation: Essays in Caribbean Culture (Lexicon, 2007)
- My Whole Life is Calypso: Essays on Sparrow (2015; ISBN 9789769583900)
- Musings, Mazes, Muses, Margins (Peepal Tree Press, 2020, ISBN 9781845234652)

Editor

- (with Stewart Brown and Mervyn Morris) Voiceprint: An Anthology of Oral and Related Poetry from the Caribbean (Harlow: Longman Caribbean, 1989)
