= Andrew Salkey =

British-Jamaican writer, journalist, broadcaster and political activist (1928–1995)

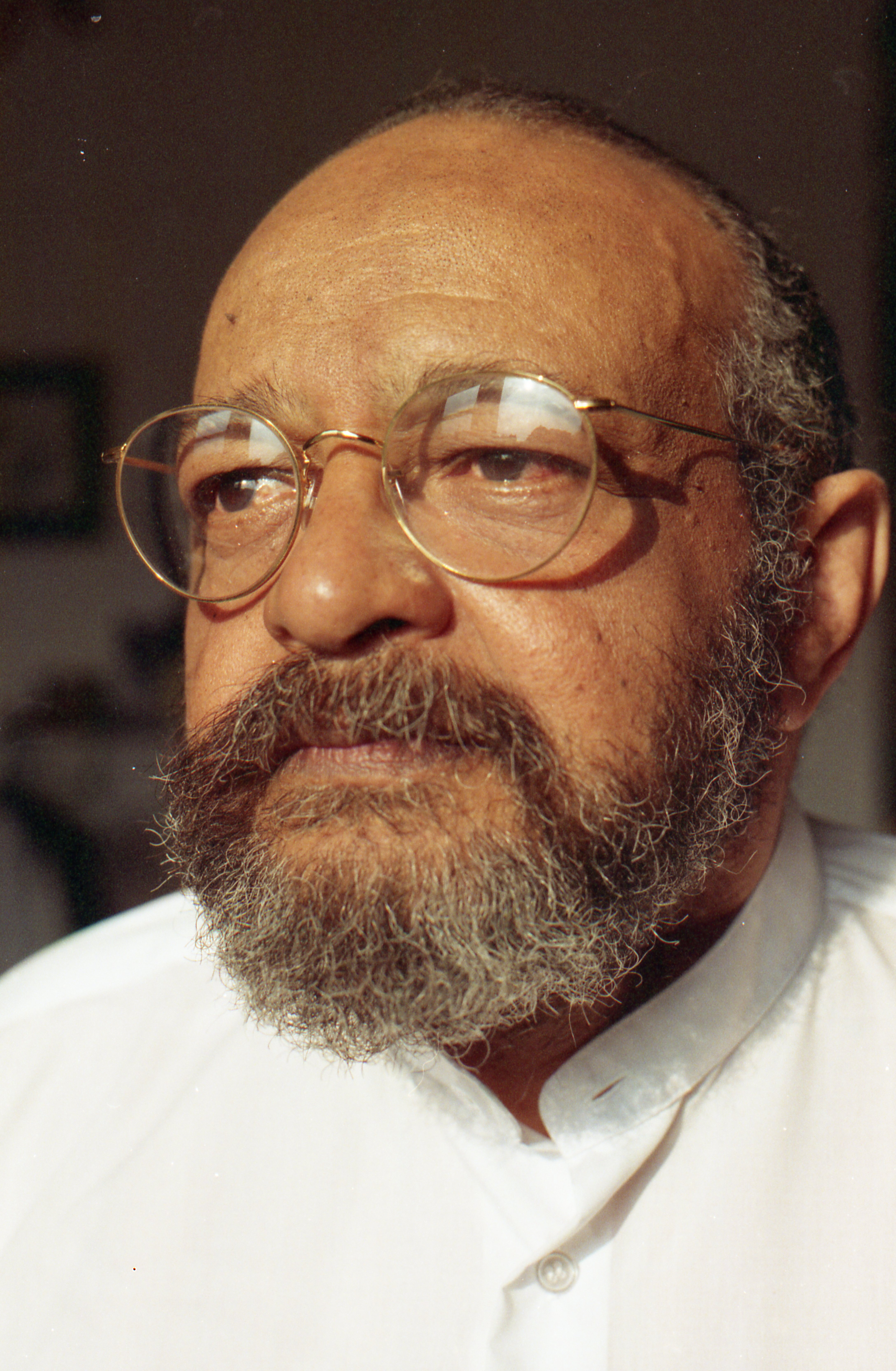
- Salkey in 1992
- Born: Felix Andrew Alexander Salkey; 30 January 1928; Colón, Panama
- Died: 28 April 1995 (aged 67); Amherst, Massachusetts, U.S.
- Education: St George's College; Munro College; College of St Mark and St John
- Occupations: Novelist, poet, educator, broadcaster and journalist
- Known for: Co-founder of Caribbean Artists Movement (CAM)
- Spouse: Patricia June (née Verden)
- Children: 2 sons, Eliot Andrew and Jason Alexander

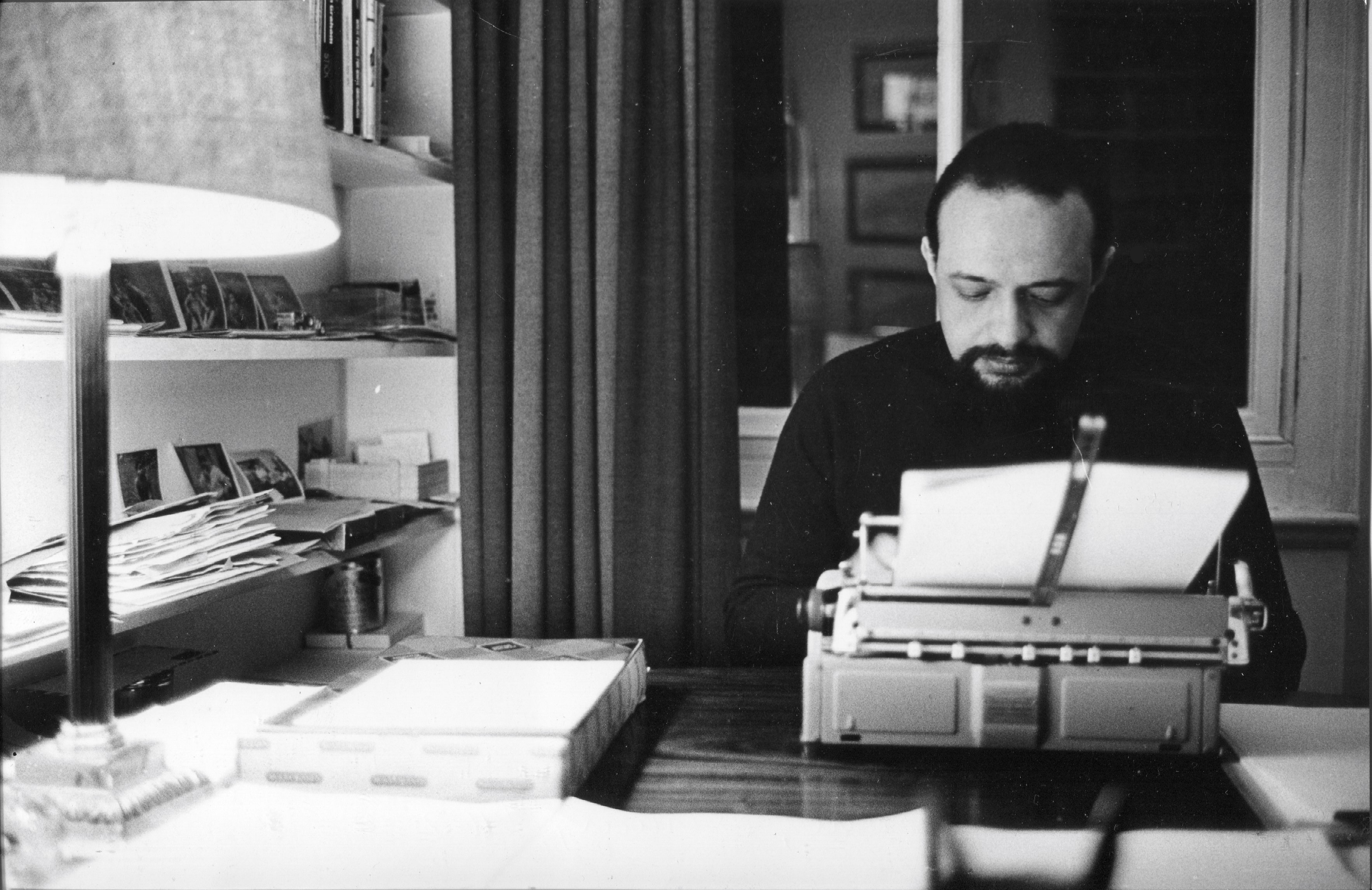
Novelist, Poet, Broadcaster, Professor and political activist

Andrew Salkey (30 January 1928 – 28 April 1995) was a Jamaican novelist, poet, children's books writer and journalist of Jamaican and Panamanian origin.

He was born in Panama but was raised in Jamaica, moving to Britain in the 1952 to pursue a job in the literary world, combining a job in a South London comprehensive school teaching English with a job working on the door of a West End night club. The 1960s and 1970s saw Salkey working as a broadcaster for the BBC World Service, Caribbean section.

A prolific writer and editor, he was the author of more than 30 books in the course of his career, including novels for adults and for children, poetry collections, anthologies, travelogues and essays.

In the 1960s, he was a co-founder with John La Rose and Kamau Brathwaite of the Caribbean Artists Movement (CAM). Salkey died in Amherst, Massachusetts, where he had been teaching since the 1970s, holding a lifetime position as writer-in-residence at Hampshire College.

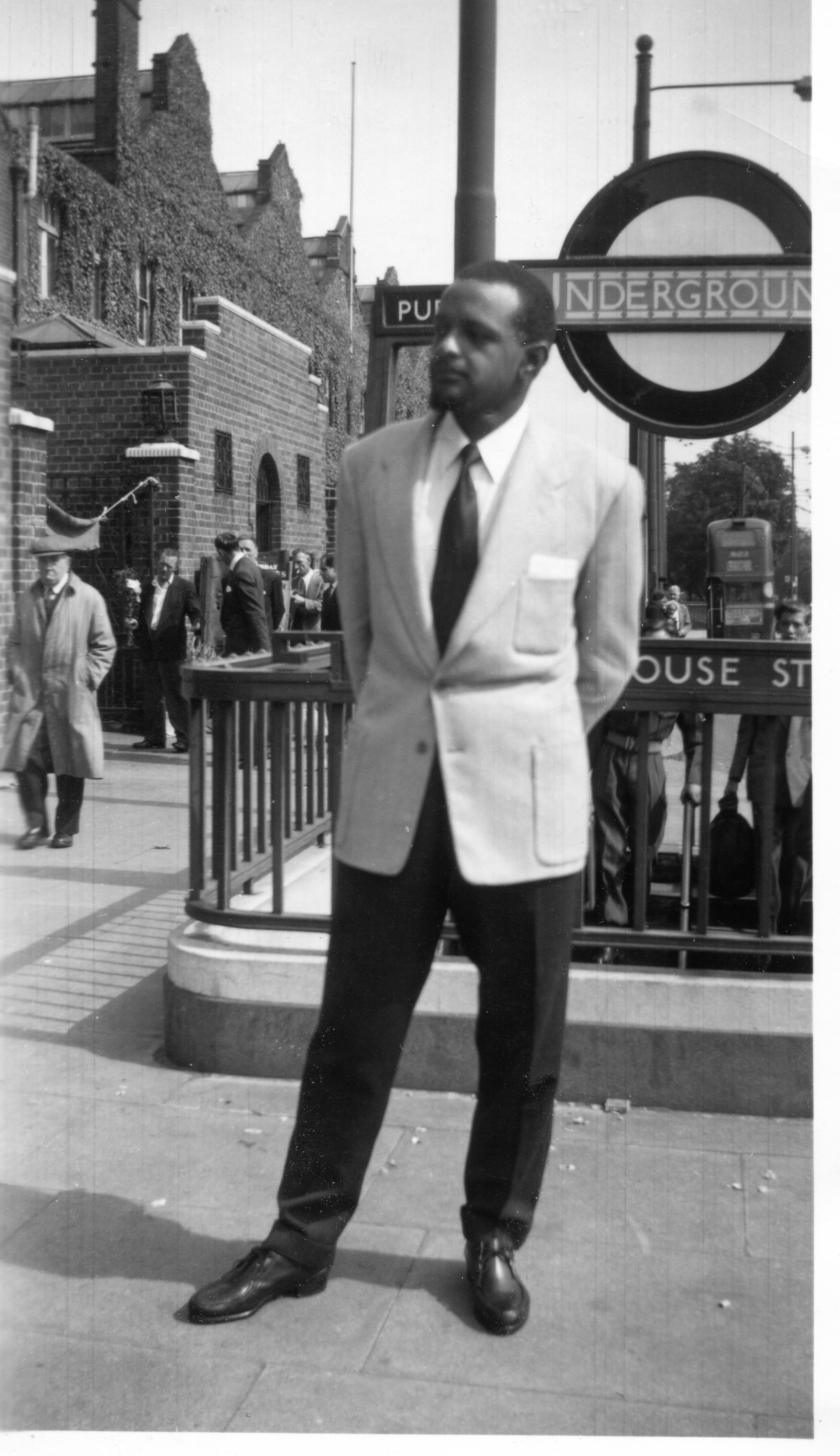
Two years after arriving in London

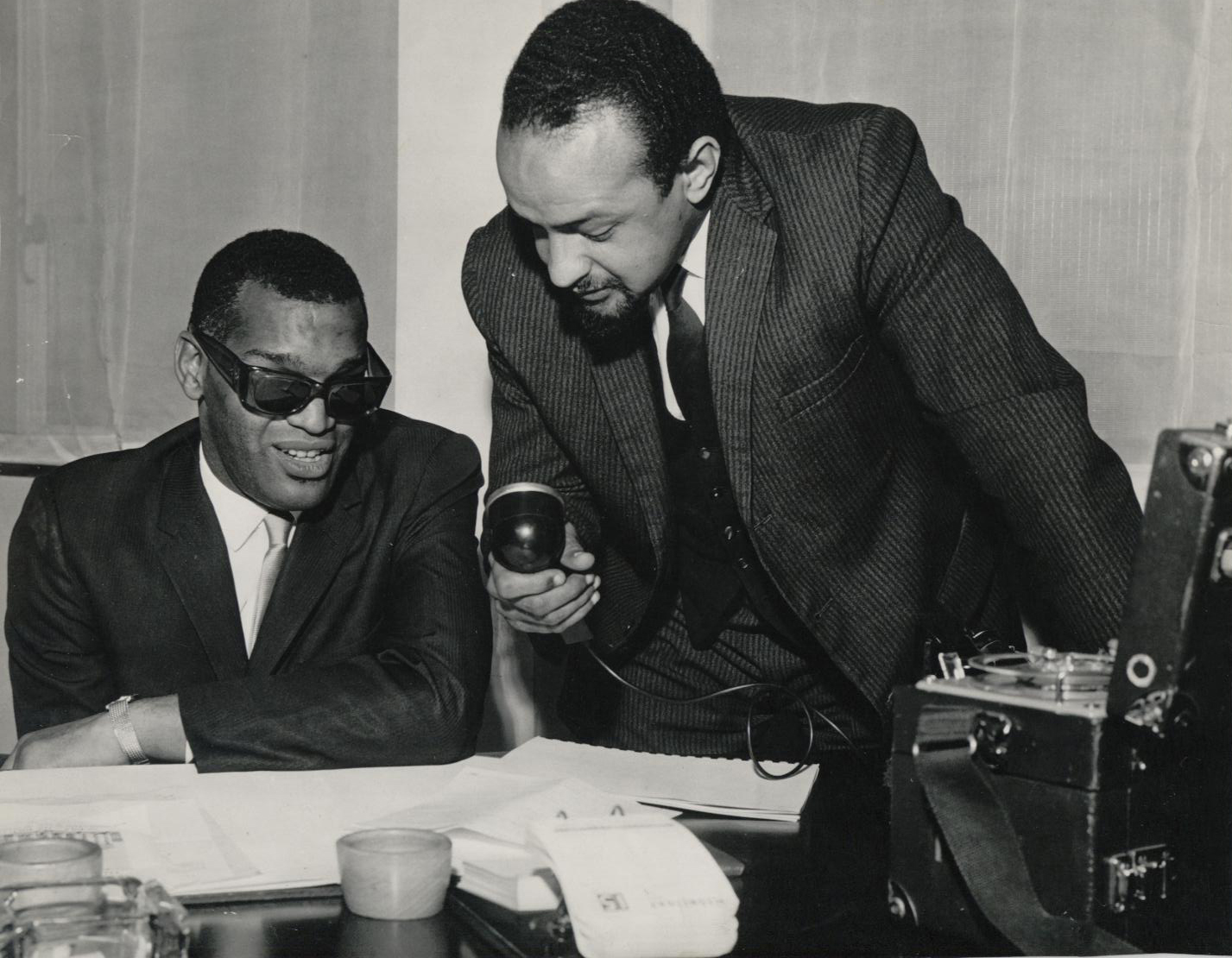
Interviewing musician Ray Charles for BBC Radio in 1966

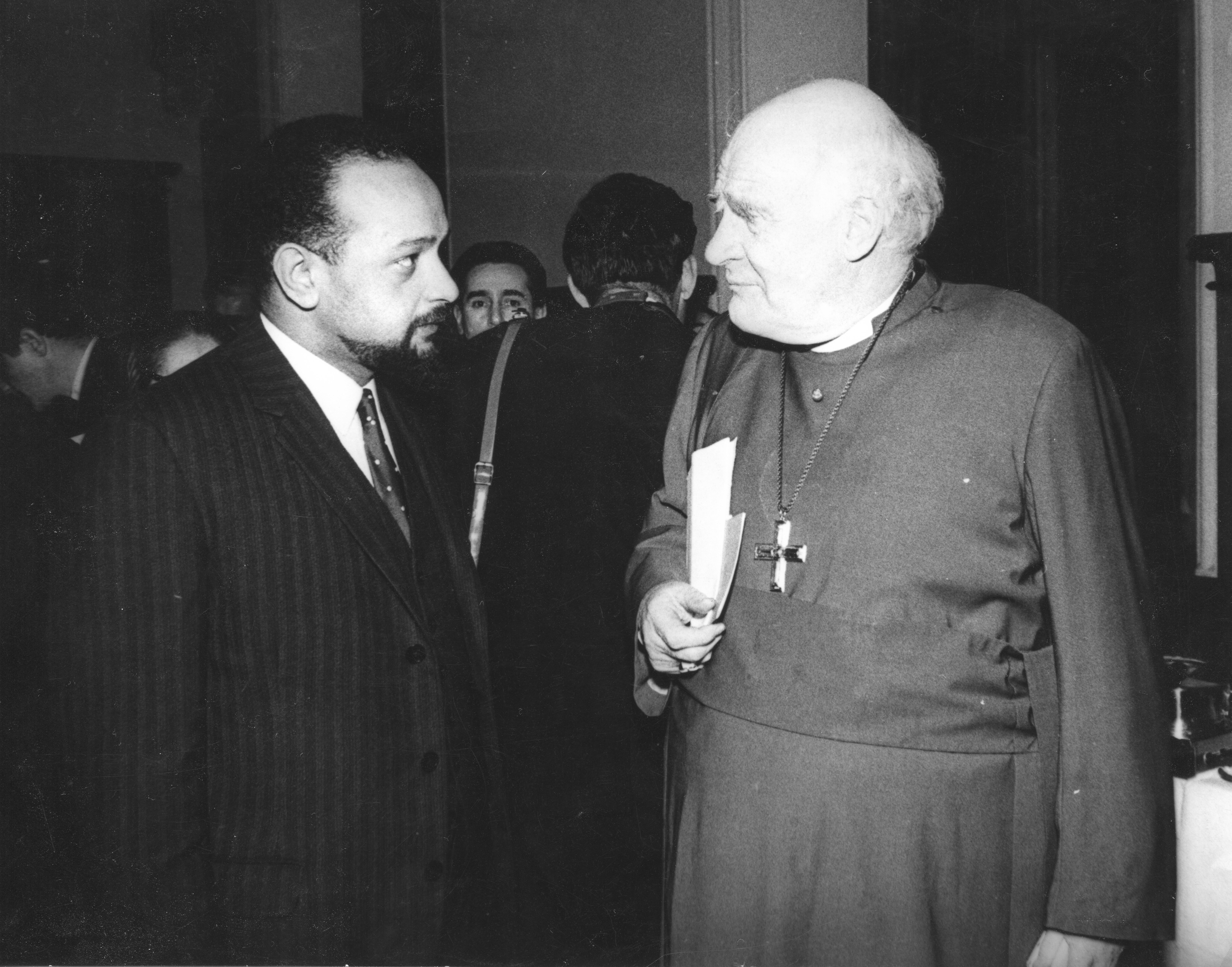
Andrew Salkey with Michael Ramsey, Archbishop of Canterbury

== Biography ==
He was born as Felix Andrew Alexander Salkey in Colón, Panama, to Jamaican parents, Andrew Alexander Salkey, a businessman, and Linda Marshall Salkey. When two years old, Salkey was sent to Jamaica, where he was raised by his grandmother and his mother, who worked there as a teacher, while his father continued to work in Panama.

Salkey was educated at St George's College, in Kingston, and at Munro College, in St. Elizabeth, before going to England in the early 1950s to attend the College of St Mark and St John. According to Stuart Hall, Salkey "quickly took his place at the centre of a small circle of Caribbean writers and intellectuals. For a critical period, Salkey was the key figure, the main presenter and writer-in-residence in the Caribbean section of the BBC World Service at Bush House, London, and his programmes became a glittering showcase for a generation of writers, including Sam Selvon and George Lamming, who had made London their second home. Established and aspiring authors were chivvied, cajoled, gently chastised, inspired and schooled to produce new work for radio on the Caribbean Voices programme over which Andrew Salkey often presided."

After reading V. S. Naipaul's first story, Salkey encouraged him to continue writing. At the BBC, Salkey co-wrote My People and Your People, with D. G. Bridson, a radio play about a love affair between a West Indian migrant and a Scottish skiffle player.

Salkey was a part of the West Indian Students Union (WISU), which provided an effective forum for Caribbean students to express their ideas and provided voluntary support to the "harassed" working-class Caribbean immigrant community, during the 1960s, 1970s and 1980s. The association also included Gerry Burton and Arif Ali.

In the mid-1950s, Salkey taught English at Walworth Secondary School (also known as Mina Road School), an early comprehensive just off the Old Kent Road in South-east London. His first novel, A Quality of Violence – set around 1900 and narrated in a Jamaican patois – was published in 1959, and his second, Escape to An Autumn Pavement, in 1960. That same year Salkey edited one of the first anthologies of Caribbean short stories, West Indian Stories, and was awarded a Guggenheim Fellowship in the field of folklore and popular culture. His novels that followed were The Late Emancipation of Jerry Stover (1968), The Adventures of Catullus Kelly (1969), and Come Home, Malcolm Heartland (1976). Thereafter, Salkey concentrated on writing poetry and reworking tales of Caribbean folklore.

As noted by Eleanor Casson, archivist and cataloguer at the British Library, Salkey "had a significant influence on the development of Caribbean literary activism in London during the 1960s and 1970s through his unwavering support of two of the first black publishing houses in London New Beacon Books and Bogle L'Ouverture (BLP)."

In 1966, he co-founded with John La Rose and Kamau Brathwaite the Caribbean Artists Movement (CAM), as a platform for Caribbean artists, writers, actors and musicians. Salkey gave an address at CAM's third and final conference, held at the West Indian Students' Centre, in which he talked about the importance of "Black awareness", and stated: "Our own Caribbean communities must become the new centres of which we first seek approval of the fruits of our imagination. Only then may we move from within our society outward with assurance."

During the latter part of his life, Salkey was a professor of creative writing at Hampshire College in Amherst, where he went in 1976.

Salkey was good friends with Austin Clarke, and the two had a long correspondence, a great deal of which is available in Clarke's files at the McMaster University Archives in Hamilton, Ontario.

"I was headed nowhere like a hundred million others: I had escaped a malformed Jamaican middle class; I had attained my autumn pavement; I had done more than my fair share of hurting, rejecting, and condemning; and I had created another kind of failure, and this time, in another country." (From Escape To An Autumn Pavement)

== Literary work ==
The settings of Salkey's novels show a constant back and forth between his country of origin and the countries in which he lived. His first novel, A Quality of Violence (1959), is set in a remote area of Jamaica; the second novel, Escape to An Autumn Pavement (1960), is set in London, and is a novel of exile; his 1968 novel, The Late Emancipation of Jerry Stover, is a return to Jamaica and a "damning indictment of the nihilism of middle class Caribbean life". Then, The Adventures of Catullus Kelly (1969), is again set in London, and his last major novel, Come Home, Malcolm Heartland (1976), "has as its theme the revolutionary activity and posturing of black secret agents and exiles in London".

As a Caribbean writer living in Britain, Salkey had this "insider-outsider" point of view, an expression often used when referring to the main character of his second novel, Escape to an Autumn Pavement. But he did not only write about the conflicting identity of Caribbean people living in Britain, he also evokes queer themes, such as homosexuality, again in Escape to an Autumn Pavement. "Salkey’s novel can itself be seen as a 'meeting point', a literary exploration of queer and migrant lives conducted in the intimate space of the British home."

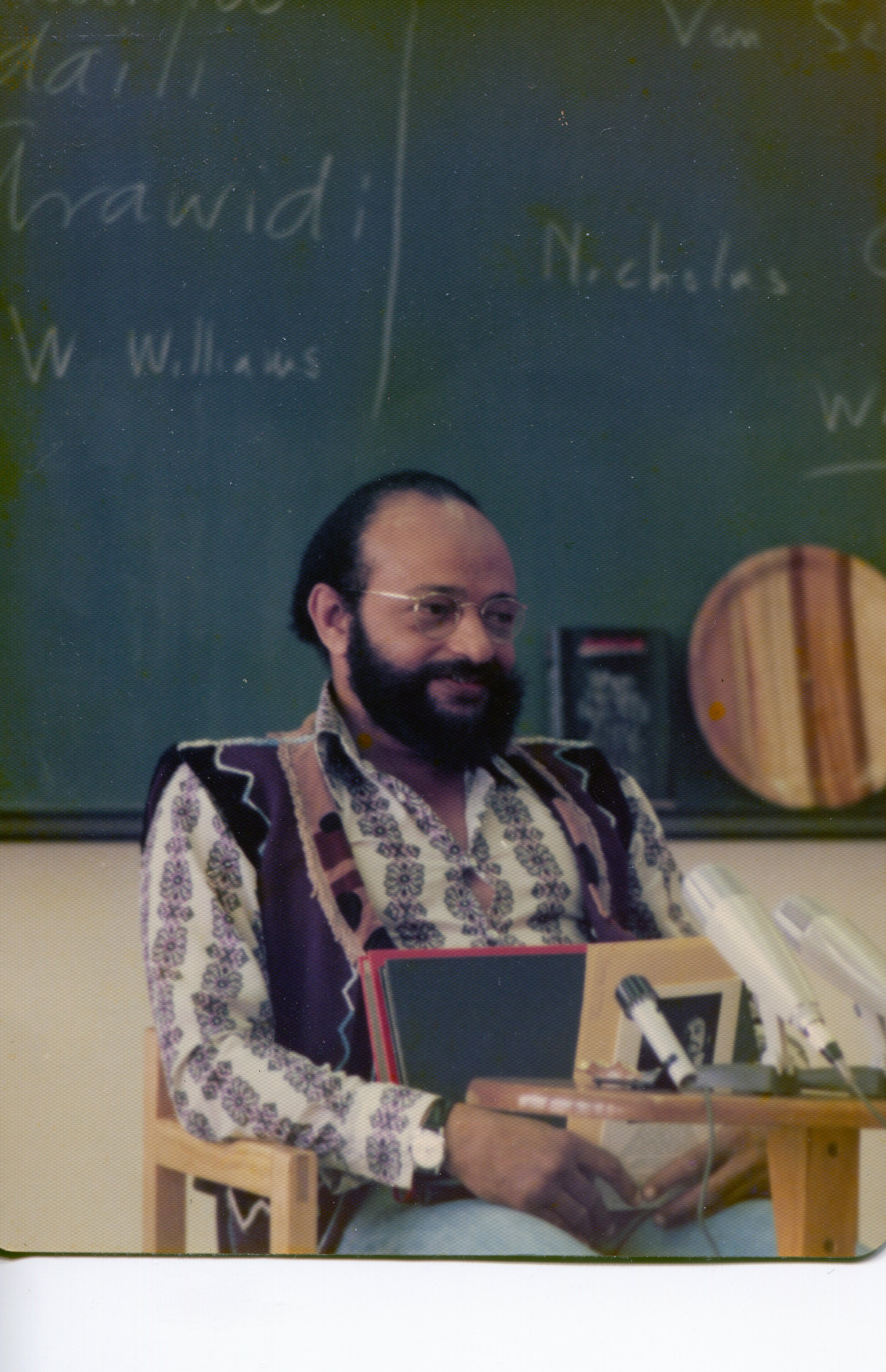
Andrew Salkey on Nova Scotia wearing his Anancy inspired waistcoat

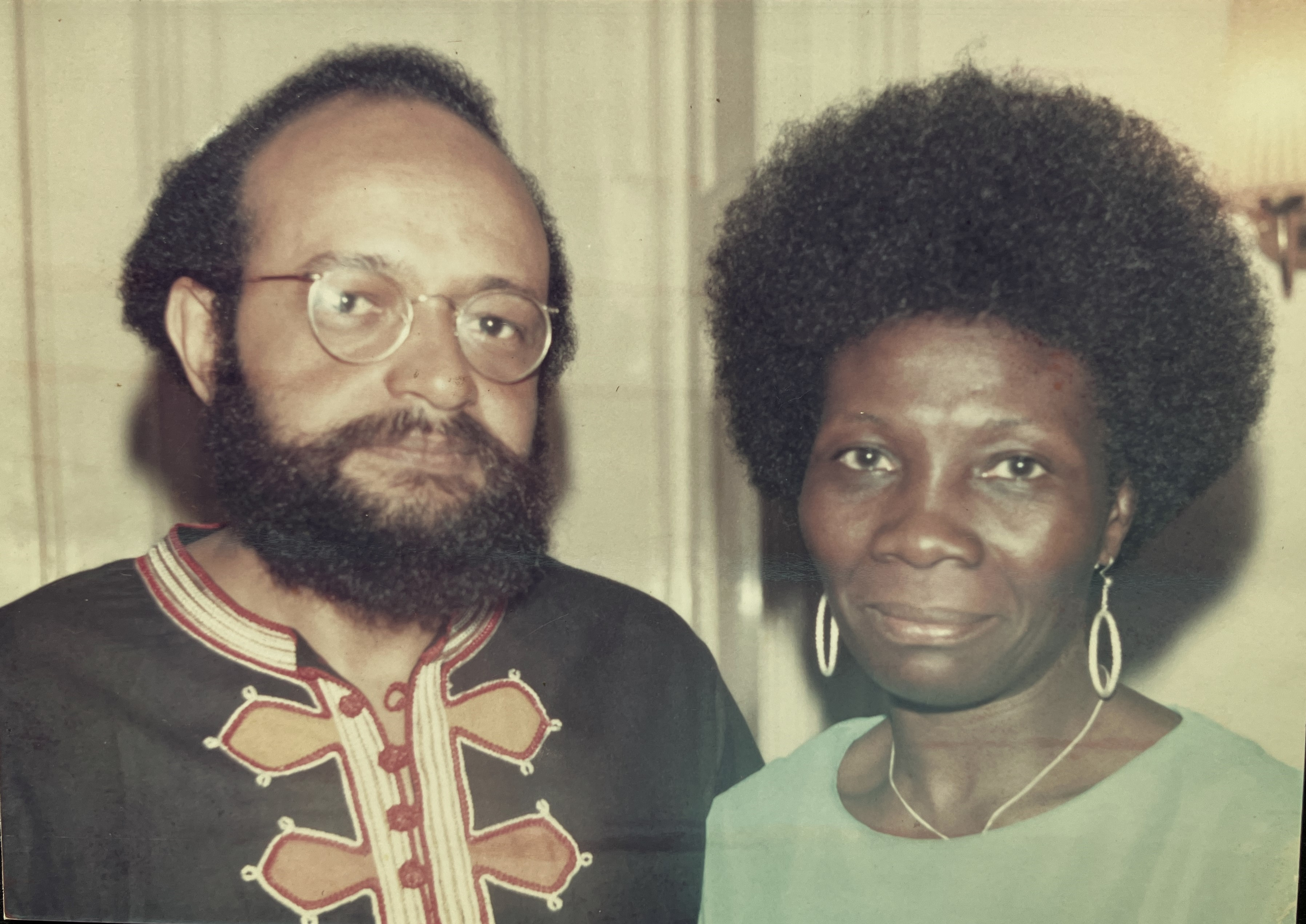
Andrew Salkey with Jessica Huntley of Bogle-L'Ouverture publishing Aug 1974

== "Salkey's Score" ==
Salkey was a director and constant supporter of the London-based publishing company Bogle-L'Ouverture founded by Guyanese-born Jessica Huntley, who (together with a committee comprising Louis James, John La Rose, Marc Matthews, Mervyn Morris, Jason Salkey, Anne Walmsley, Eliot Salkey and Ronald Warwick) organised a two-day symposium and celebration called "Salkey's Score". Held on 19–20 June 1992 at the Commonwealth Institute, the event paid tribute to Salkey in respect of his work in London in the 1960s and 1970s with the Caribbean Artists Movement (CAM); his journalism on the BBC radio programme Caribbean Voices; his contributions to developing the teaching of Caribbean writing in schools; the importance he gave to the relationship of Africa to personal and communal Caribbean identity; his work in Cuba; and his prolific output of novels, poetry and other writings.

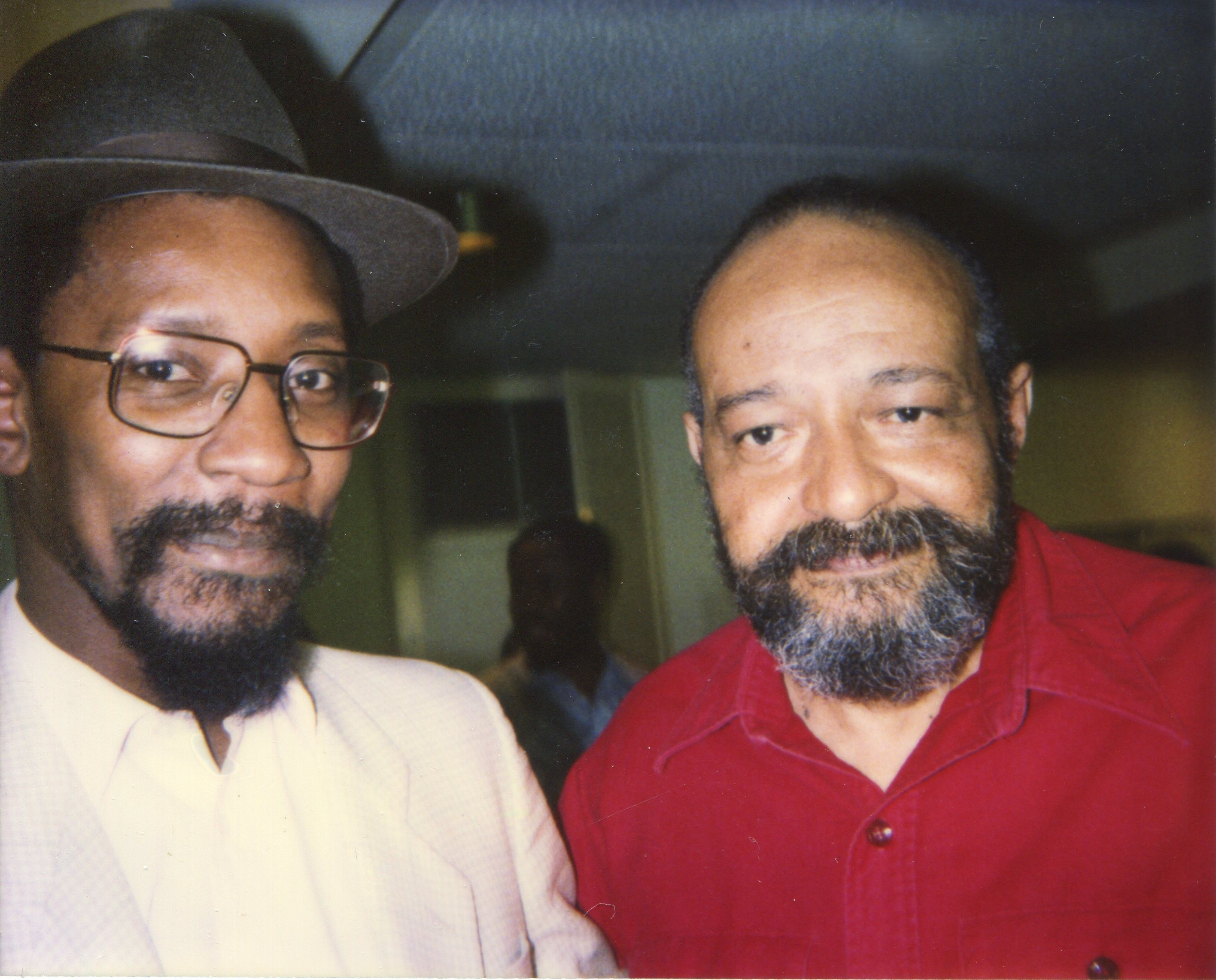
Linton Kwesi Johnson and Andrew Salkey at the Commonwealth Institute, London for the Salkey Score Symposium In June 1992

At the event, Robert Chrisman, editor of The Black Scholar, presented Salkey with the Black Scholar 25th Anniversary Award for Excellence in the field of Literature, and other presenters included broadcaster Trevor McDonald, publisher Eric Huntley, publisher/editor Margaret Busby, poet-novelist Edward Kamau Brathwaite, New Beacon Books founder John La Rose, writer E. A. Markham, CAM member Louis James, professor of feminist studies Jill Lewis, Arts Council literature director Alastair Niven, and Anne Walmsley, author of The Caribbean Artists Movement 1966–1971.

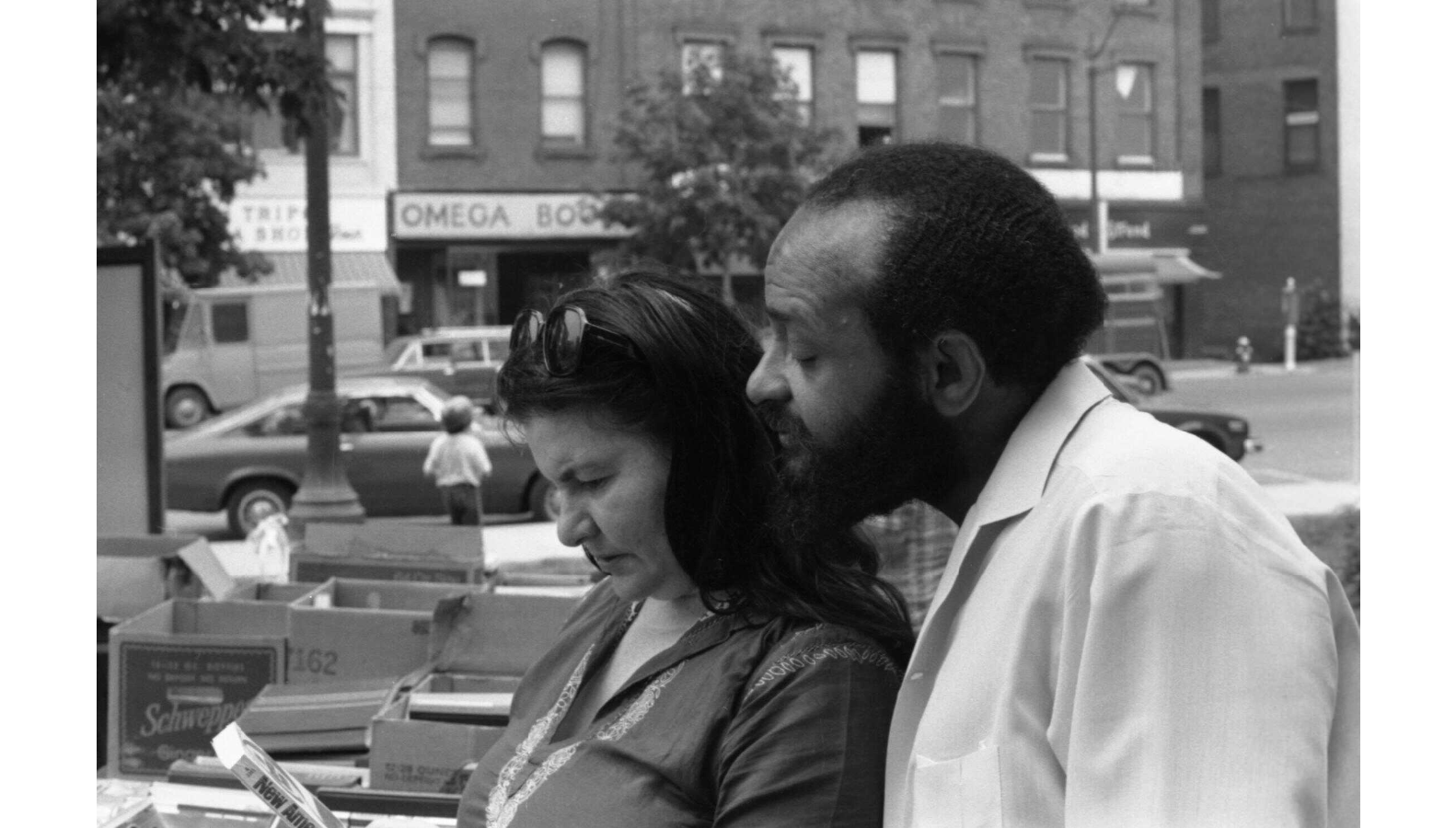
The Salkeys look at a book from a yard sale in Northampton, MA photo by Irma McClaurin

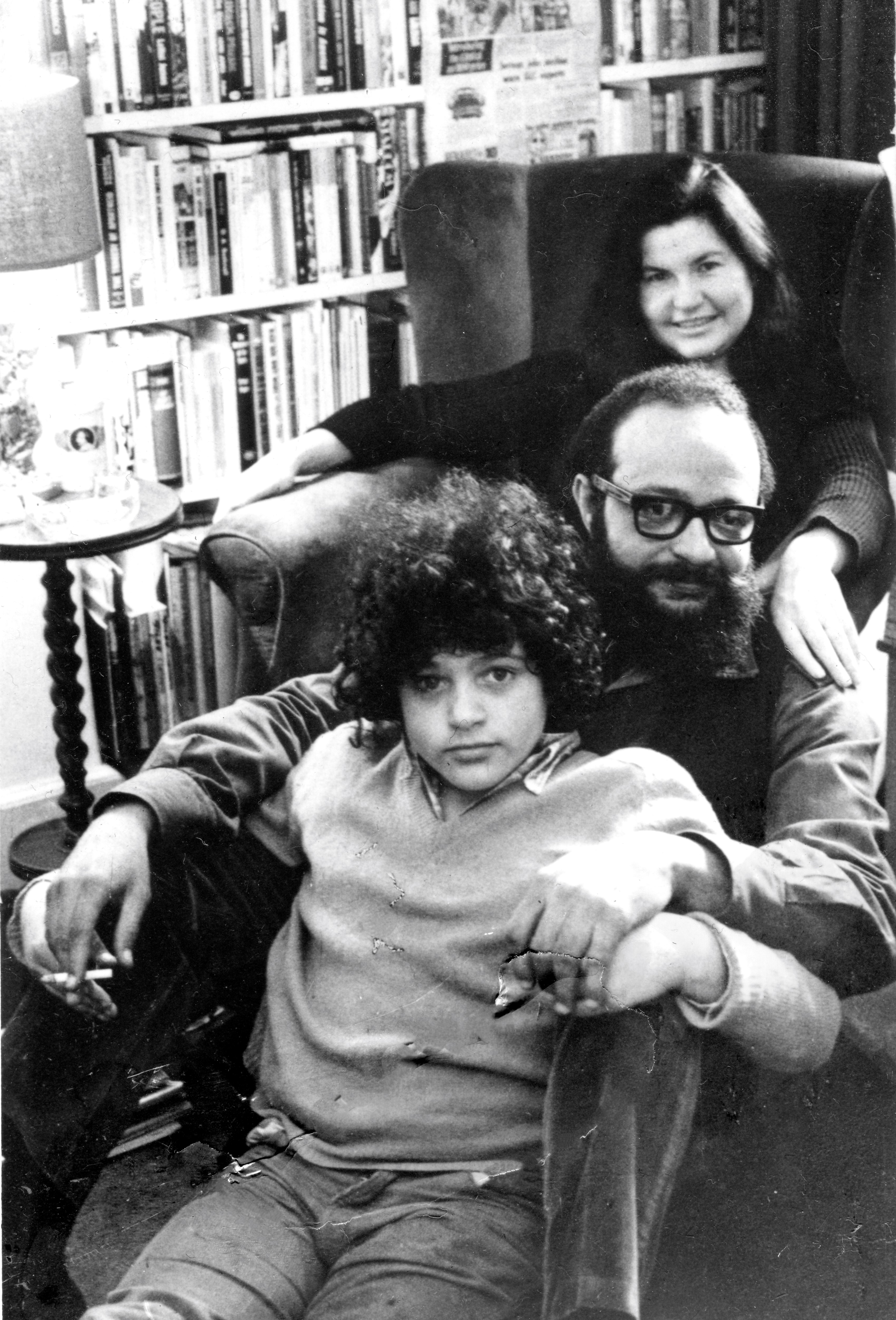
Pat, Eliot and Andrew Salkey at home on Mpscow Road in London

== Personal life ==
Salkey and Patricia Verden married in 1958 and the couple's two sons are Eliot and Jason Salkey.

Salkey had been ailing for some time before his death, aged 67, on the morning of 28 April 1995, while in an ambulance on the way to Cooley Dickinson Hospital in Northampton, Massachusetts. He was buried at Mill Hill Cemetery in London on 11 May 1995.

== Legacy ==
The Andrew Salkey Memorial Scholarship has been established at Hampshire College, as an "award for students who show exceptional writing promise".

On 29 March 2013, Paul Gilroy was meant to attend the Andrew Salkey Memorial Reading, at the Hampshire College Cultural Center, but could not due to adverse weather conditions.

In August 2018, Salkey's poem "History and Away", from his collection Away: Poems (Allison and Busby, 1980), was among those by six poets (the others being James Berry, Kwame Dawes, Lorna Goodison, Grace Nichols, and Jean "Binta" Breeze) that were displayed on the London Underground in a set entitled "Windrush 70, A Celebration of Caribbean poetry" to commemorate the 70th anniversary of the arrival in Britain of the ship Empire Windrush from Jamaica in June 1948, marking the beginning of the most significant West Indian post-World War II migration to the UK.

In April 2022, Margaret Busby and Raymond Antrobus discussed Salkey's work – in particular his 1960 novel Escape to An Autumn Pavement and his 1973 epic poem Jamaica – in the podcast Backlisted, presented by John Mitchinson and Andy Miller.

== Selected bibliography ==
- "Jamaica Symphony" (long poem, unpublished, winner of Thomas Helmore Poetry Prize, 1955).
- A Quality of Violence (novel; Hutchinson, 1959; New Beacon Books, 1978). ISBN 090124127X; ISBN 9780901241276.
- Escape to an Autumn Pavement (novel; Hutchinson, 1960; Leeds: Peepal Tree Press, Modern Caribbean Classics, 2009)
- West Indian Stories (editor; Faber and Faber, 1960, 1968). ISBN 0571086306
- Hurricane (children's novel; Oxford University Press, 1964; 1979. Harmondsworth: Puffin Books, 1977. New York: Penguin, 1977) (winner of the Deutscher Jugendliteraturpreis)
- Earthquake (children's novel; Oxford University Press, 1965)
- Stories from the Caribbean (editor; Paul Elek Books, 1965)
- Commonwealth Poetry (editor of West Indian section; 1965)
- The Shark Hunters (Nelson, 1966)
- Drought (Oxford University Press, 1966). ISBN 978-0192712585
- Riot (illustrated by William Papes; Oxford University Press, 1967). ISBN 9780192712714
- Caribbean Prose: an anthology for secondary schools (editor; Evans, 1967)
- The Late Emancipation of Jerry Stover (novel; Hutchinson, 1968). ISBN 0-09-085530-2
- The Adventures of Catullus Kelly (Hutchinson, 1969). ISBN 0-09-095140-9
- Island Voices: Stories from the West Indies (compiler; Liveright, 1970). ISBN 0-87140-504-0
- Jonah Simpson (Oxford University Press, 1969), ISBN 978-0192713032
- Breaklight: an anthology of Caribbean poetry, chosen, edited and introduced by Andrew Salkey (Hamish Hamilton, 1971). ISBN 0-241-01962-1
- Havana Journal (Penguin Books, 1971). ISBN 0-14-021303-1
- Georgetown Journal: a Caribbean writer’s journey from London via Port of Spain to Georgetown, Guyana, 1970 (New Beacon Books, 1972). ISBN 0-901241-13-X
- Caribbean Essays: an anthology; edited and introduced by Andrew Salkey (Evans, 1973). ISBN 0-237-28943-1
- Jamaica: An epic poem exploring the historical foundations of Jamaican society (Hutchinson, 1973; Bogle-L'Ouverture Publications, 1983). ISBN 0-09-115741-2
- Anancy’s Score (Bogle-L'Ouverture Publications, 1973) ISBN 0-9501546-7-9. ISBN 0-9501546-8-7
- Joey Tyson (Bogle-L'Ouverture Publications, 1974). ISBN 0-9501546-9-5, ISBN 0-904521-00-1
- Come Home, Malcolm Heartland (novel; Hutchinson, 1976). ISBN 9780091234805
- Writing in Cuba since the Revolution: an anthology of poems, short stories, and essays (editor; Bogle-L'Ouverture Publications, 1977). ISBN 0-904521-05-2, ISBN 0-904521-04-4 (pbk)
- In the Hills Where Her Dreams Live: Poems for Chile, 1973–1978; winner of Casa de las Americas prize, 1979 (Black Scholar Press, ISBN 978-9992353257)
- The River that Disappeared (Bogle-L'Ouverture Publications, 1979). ISBN 9780904521146
- Land (Black Scholar Press, 1979)
- Danny Jones (Bogle-L'Ouverture Publications, 1980). ISBN 978-0904521184
- Riot (Oxford University Press, 1980). ISBN 0-19-277105-1
- Away (poems; Allison & Busby, 1980). ISBN 0-85031-337-6, ISBN 0-85031-338-4 (pbk)
- The One: The Story of How the People of Guyana Avenge the Murder of Their Pasero With Help from Brother Anancy and Sister Buxton (Bogle-L'Ouverture Publications, 1985). ISBN 9780904521320
- Anancy, Traveller (Bogle-L'Ouverture Press, 1992). ISBN 978-0904521856
- Brother Anancy and other stories (Longman, 1993). ISBN 0-582-22581-7
- In the Border Country and other stories (Bogle-L'Ouverture Press, 1998). ISBN 0-904521-94-X
