= Orlando Patterson =

Jamaican-American historian and sociologist (born 1940)

The Honourable Orlando Patterson OM OJ
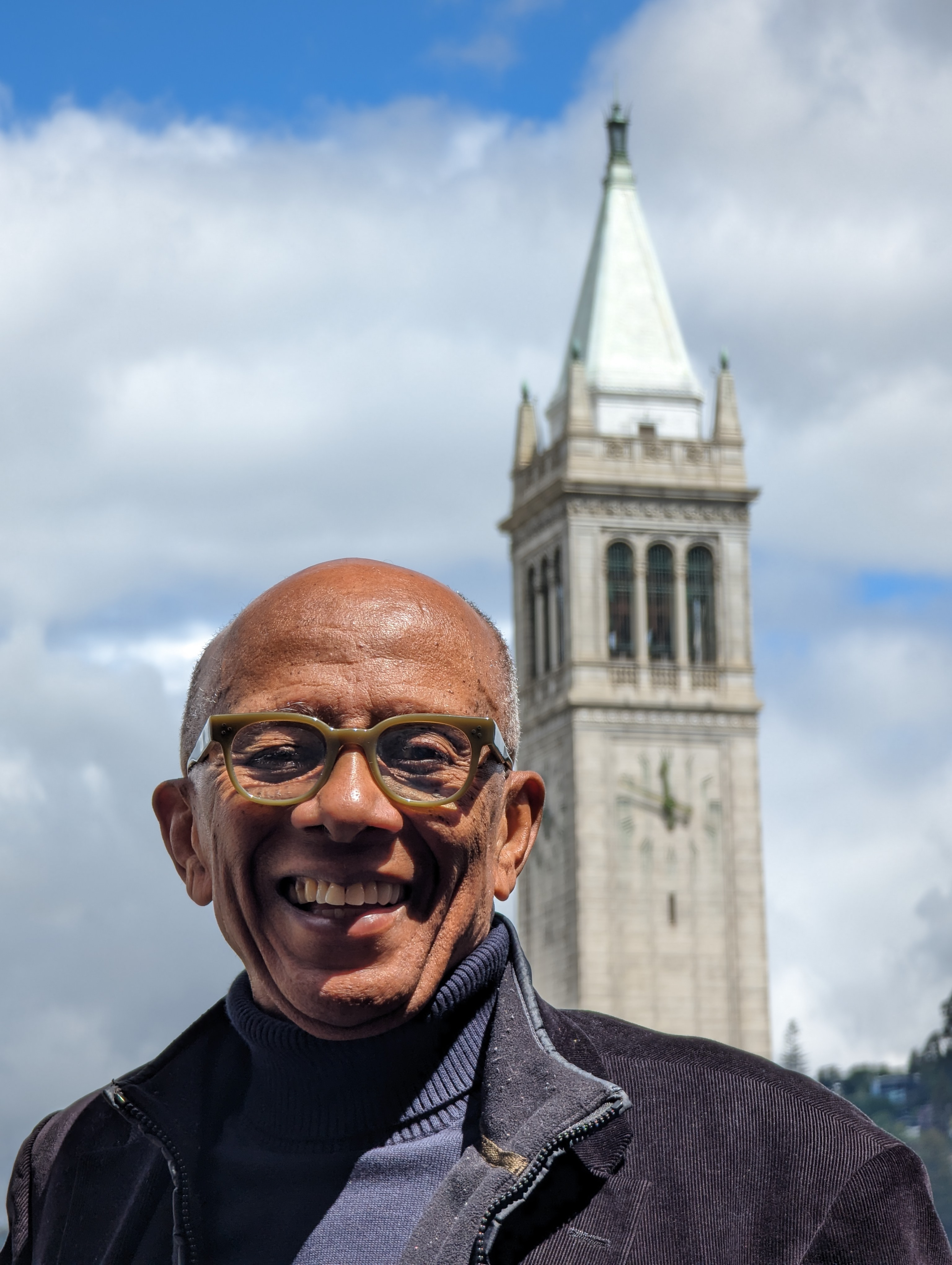
- Patterson at the University of California, Berkeley
- Born: Horace Orlando Patterson; 5 June 1940 (age 86); Westmoreland, Colony of Jamaica, British Empire
- Title: John Cowles Chair in Sociology at Harvard University
- Awards: National Book Award; Musgrave Medal; Anisfield-Wolf Book Award

Academic background
- Education: University of the West Indies; London School of Economics
- Doctoral advisor: David Glass

Academic work
- Discipline: Sociologist
- Institutions: Harvard University
- Doctoral students: Mabel Berezin, Marion Fourcade, Peter Moskos
- Main interests: Race in the US; Economic development; Slavery; Social death
- Notable works: "The Sociology of Slavery" (1967); "Slavery and Social Death" (1982); Freedom in the Making of Western Culture (1991)

Horace Orlando Patterson OM OJ (born 5 June 1940) is a Jamaican-American historian and sociologist known for his work on the history of race and slavery in the United States and Jamaica, as well as the sociology of development. He is currently the John Cowles Professor of Sociology at Harvard University. Patterson's 1991 book Freedom in the Making of Western Culture won the U.S. National Book Award for Nonfiction.

== Early life and education ==
Horace Orlando Patterson was born on 5 June 1940 in Westmoreland Parish, Jamaica, to Almina Morris and Charles A. Patterson. His parents were strong supporters of Jamaica's People National Party, the political party he grew up to serve a few decades later. His father was a local detective, and his mother became a seamstress. He had six half-siblings on his father's side but was his mother's only child. He grew up in Clarendon Parish in the small town of May Pen. He attended primary school there, then moved to Kingston to attend Kingston College. While attending Kingston College, Patterson won a Jamaica Government Exhibition scholarship in 1958. Before matriculating in 1959, he taught for a year at the Excelsior High School in Jamaica. He went on to earn a Bachelor of Science degree in economics with a concentration in sociology from the University of the West Indies, Mona, in 1962. He served as president of the Economics Society, president of the Literary Society and editor of the student magazine The Pelican. Patterson earned his doctorate in sociology at the London School of Economics in 1965, where he wrote his PhD thesis, The Sociology of Slavery. His dissertation adviser was David Glass. He also wrote for the recently founded New Left Review, his first work being "The Essays of James Baldwin" in 1964. While in London he was associated with the Caribbean Artists Movement, whose second meeting, in January 1967, was held at the Pattersons' North London flat.

== Career ==
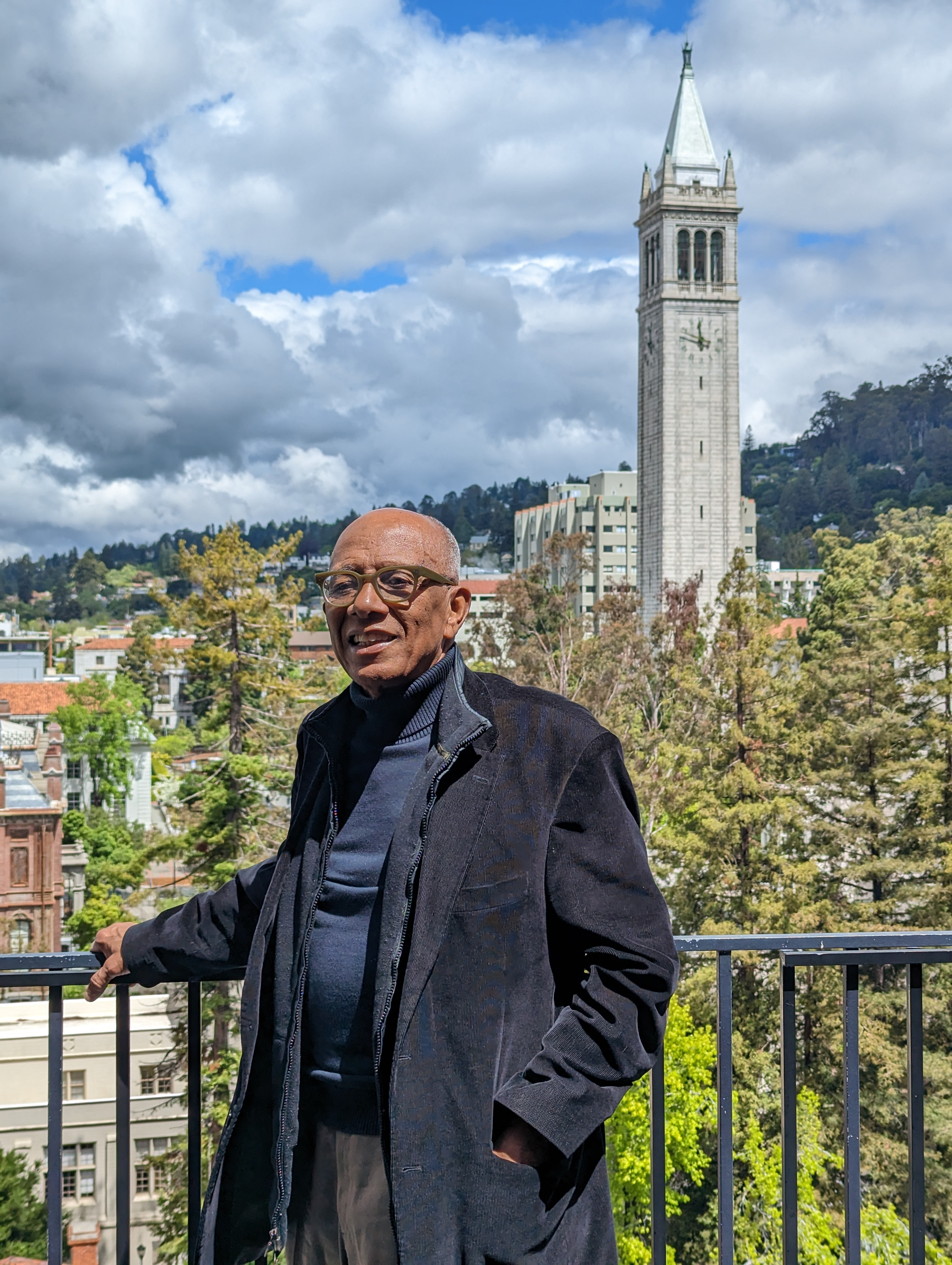
Patterson before speaking at the University of California, Berkeley, on 2 May 2023

Earlier in his career, Patterson was concerned with the economic and political development of his home country, Jamaica. He served as special advisor to Michael Manley, Prime Minister of Jamaica, from 1972 to 1979 while serving as a tenured professor at Harvard University. Committed to working both jobs, Patterson split his time between Jamaica and the United States. He often flew to Jamaica the day after his last lecture.

Patterson is best known for his work on the relationship between slavery and social death, which he has worked on extensively and written several books about. Patterson focuses interests on the culture and practice of freedom, comparative study of slavery and ethno-racial relationships, sociological issues relating to underdeveloped areas in which he references the Caribbean and gender and family relations of black societies. Other contributions include historical sociology and fictional writing with themes of post-colonialism. Patterson has also spent time analyzing social science's scholarship and ethical considerations.

Patterson currently holds the John Cowles Chair in sociology at Harvard University.

In October 2015 he received the Gold Musgrave Medal in recognition of his contribution to literature. In 2020 he was appointed a member of the Order of Merit, Jamaica's third-highest national honour.

In 2024 he was the receiver of the Hegel Prize in Stuttgart.

== Professional associations ==
- Fellow, American Academy of Arts and Sciences
- Ernest W. Burgess Fellow, American Academy of Political and Social Science
- Member, American Sociological Association

== Awards ==
- 2024: Hegel Prize
- 2023: Barry Prize for Distinguished Intellectual Achievement from the American Academy of Sciences and Letters.
- 2020: Order of Merit, Jamaica. "For his highly distinguished international contribution to Academia, West Indian Literature, Sociology, and the Epistemology of Social Culture" Order of Jamaica
- 2016: Anisfield-Wolf Book Award, Lifetime Achievement
- 2015: Gold Musgrave Medal
- 1997: Walter Channing Cabot Faculty Prize, Harvard
- 1991: National Book Award, Non-Fiction
- 1983: Walter Channing Cabot Faculty Prize, Harvard
- 1983: American Political Science Association
- 1983: Ralph Bunche Award from Howard University for the Best Scholarly Work on Pluralism (co-winner): American
- 1983: Distinguished Contribution to Scholarship (formerly Sorokin Prize): American Sociological Association
- 1965: Best Novel in English (The Children of Sisyphus): Dakar Festival of Negro Arts

== Selected works ==
External videos
- Booknotes interview with Patterson on Freedom in the Making of Western Culture, April 12, 1992, C-SPAN
- Presentation by Patterson on The Ordeal of Integration, November 2, 1997, C-SPAN

=== Academic ===
- The Sociology of Slavery: Black Society in Jamaica, 1655-1838. 1967; 2022(2nd ed.).
- Ethnic Chauvinism: The Reactionary Impulse. 1977.
- Slavery and Social Death. 1982.
- Freedom in the Making of Western Culture. 1991. Later renamed Freedom, Vol. 1: Freedom in the Making of Western Culture – winner of National Book Award
- The Ordeal of Integration. 1997
- Rituals of Blood: Consequences of Slavery in Two American Centuries. 1999.
- Freedom: Freedom in the Modern World. 2006.
- The Cultural Matrix: Understanding Black Youth (with Ethan Fosse). 2015.
- The Confounding Island: Jamaica and the Postcolonial Predicament. 2019.
- The Sociology of Slavery: Black Society in Jamaica. Wiley, 2022.
- The Paradox of Freedom: A Biographical Dialogue (with David Scott) 2023

=== Novels ===
- The Children of Sisyphus. 1965.
- An Absence of Ruins. 1967.
- Die the Long Day. 1972.

=== Articles and chapters ===
- Patterson, Orlando (September 1, 1971). "Rethinking Black History". Harvard Educational Review. 41 (3): 297–315. doi:10.17763/haer.41.3.78u1p14257x57814.
- Patterson, Orlando (Spring 1972). "Toward a Future That Has No Past: Reflections on the Fate of Blacks in the Americas" (PDF). The Public Interest: 25–62.
- Patterson, Orlando (1992). "Race, Gender and Liberal Fallacies". The Black Scholar. 22 (1–2): 77–80. doi:10.1080/00064246.1992.11413015.
- Patterson, Orlando (1984). "Slavery: The Underside of Freedom∗". Slavery & Abolition. 5 (2): 87–104. doi:10.1080/01440398408574867.
- Patterson, Orlando (1994). "Ecumenical America: Global Culture and the American Cosmos". World Policy Journal. 11 (2): 103–117.
- Patterson, Orlando (2004). "Culture and Continuity: Causal Structures in Socio-Cultural Persistence". In Friedland, Roger; Mohr, John (eds.). Matters of Culture: Cultural Sociology in Practice (PDF). New York: Cambridge University Press. pp. 71–109..
- Patterson, Orlando; Kaufman, J (2005). "Cross-National Cultural Diffusion: The Global Spread of Cricket". American Sociological Review. 70 (1): 82–110. doi:10.1177/000312240507000105. S2CID 20809241.
- Patterson, Orlando; Tomlinson, Alan; Young, Christopher (2011). "The Culture of Sports". Journal of Historical Sociology. 24 (4): 549–563. doi:10.1111/j.1467-6443.2011.01418.x.
- Patterson, Orlando (July 2014). "Making Sense of Culture". Annual Review of Sociology. 40 (1): 1–30. doi:10.1146/annurev-soc-071913-043123.
- Patterson, Orlando (December 1, 2014). "How Sociologists Made Themselves Irrelevant". The Chronicle of Higher Education.
- Patterson, Orlando (2015). "From One Out-In to Another: What's Missing in Wacquant's Structural Analysis". Urban Studies. 53 (6): 1089–1094. doi:10.1177/0042098015614438. S2CID 147431488.
- Patterson, Orlando (2017). "Freedom, Slavery, and Identity in Renaissance Florence". In Schmidtz, David; Pavel, Carmen E. (eds.). The Oxford Handbook of Freedom. Vol. 1. New York: Oxford University Press. doi:10.1093/oxfordhb/9780199989423.013.8.
- Patterson, Orlando; Zhuo, Xiaolin (2018). "Modern Trafficking, Slavery, and Other Forms of Servitude". Annual Review of Sociology. 44 (1): 407–439. doi:10.1146/annurev-soc-073117-041147. S2CID 149967300.
- Patterson, Orlando (2019). "The Denial of Slavery in Contemporary American Sociology". Theory and Society. 48 (6): 903–914. doi:10.1007/s11186-019-09369-x. S2CID 214050925.

=== Commentary ===
- Patterson, Orlando (May 9, 2015). "Opinion | The Real Problem With America's Inner Cities". The New York Times.
- Patterson, Orlando (August 13, 2016). "Opinion | The Secret of Jamaica's Runners". The New York Times.
