= Kenneth Ramchand =

Trinidadian academic and writer (born 1939)

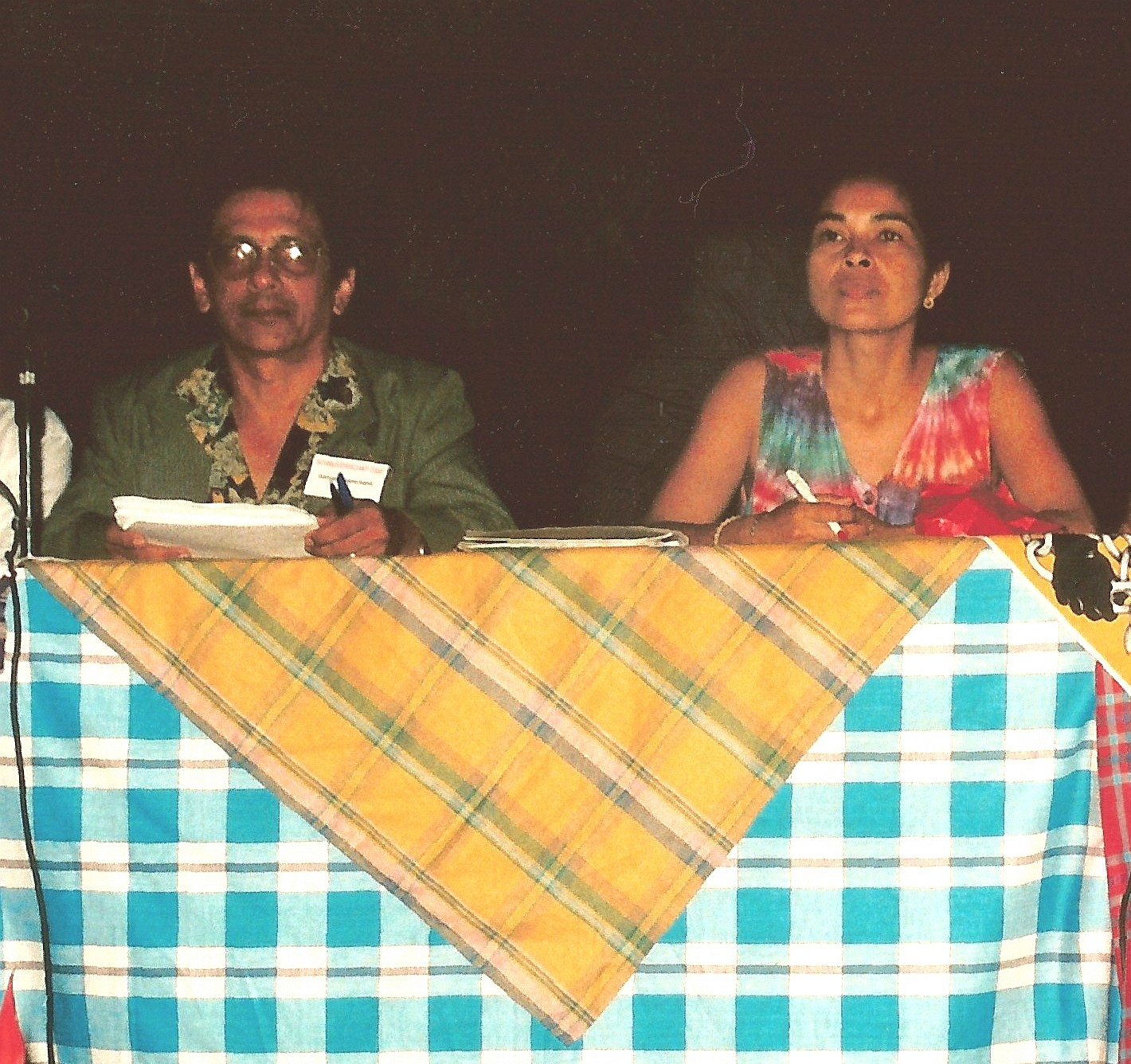
- Ramchand (left) with Surinamese writer Ismene Krishnadath at the Schrijverschap 2000 congress in Paramaribo, July 1997
- Born: 1939 (age 86–87); Trinidad and Tobago
- Education: University of Edinburgh
- Occupations: Academic and writer
- Notable work: The West Indian Novel and its Background (1970)
- Awards: Bocas Henry Swanzy Award (2014)

Kenneth Ramchand (born 1939) is a Trinidad and Tobago academic and writer, who is widely respected as "arguably the most prominent living critic of Caribbean fiction". He has written extensively on many West Indian authors, including V. S. Naipaul, Earl Lovelace and Sam Selvon, as well as editing several significant cultural publications. His seminal text, The West Indian Novel and Its Background (1970), had a transformational effect on the syllabus of the University of the West Indies (UWI) and the internationalization of West Indian literature as an academic discipline.

Ramchand is Professor Emeritus of English at the St. Augustine campus of UWI. Until his resignation in June 2009, he was associate provost at the University of Trinidad and Tobago (UTT). He was for some years an independent Senator in the Senate of Trinidad and Tobago. Ramchand is also an Emeritus Professor at Colgate University in Hamilton, New York.

== Career ==
Born in Trinidad and Tobago, Ramchand holds an MA and PhD from the University of Edinburgh, where he attended as a scholarship student (1959–63).

His first book, The West Indian Novel and Its Background, was published in 1970, and he has noted: "I wrote it at just the right time. It was influential in the creation and internationalization of an academic discipline called 'West Indian Literature'; it stimulated the development of graduate studies in the Department of English of the University of the West Indies; and it was seminal in the transformation of the syllabus of 'English' at the University of the West Indies." Ramchand was UWI's first Professor of West Indian Literature and he was Head of the Department of Liberal Arts at St. Augustine for several years.

He has also been a Senior Fulbright Scholar affiliated to Yale University and the University of Tulsa at Oklahoma, a visiting professor at Indiana University and Colgate University, as well as a Fellow of the John Simon Guggenheim Foundation.

In 2005, Ramchand was appointed chairman of the University of Trinidad and Tobago (UTT), a position he held until 2009.

== Awards ==
In 1996, Ramchand was awarded a Trinidad and Tobago Chaconia Medal Gold for his work in Literature, Education and Culture.

In 2012, the National Library of Trinidad and Tobago honoured him with a NALIS Lifetime Literary Achievement Award.

At the 2014 NGC Bocas Lit Fest, Ramchand was honoured alongside Professor Gordon Rohlehr with the Bocas Henry Swanzy Award for Distinguished Service to Caribbean Letters, which recognises the lifetime achievement of editors, publishers, critics and broadcasters.

== Bibliography ==
- West Indian Narrative: an Introductory Anthology (editor). London: Nelson, 1966.
- The West Indian Novel and its Background. London: Faber, 1970.
- An Introduction to the Study of West Indian Literature. Sunbury-on-Thames: Nelson Caribbean, 1976.
- West Indian Poetry: An Anthology for Schools (editor). London: Longman, 1989.
- Act of Possession: the New World of West Indian Writing. Port of Spain: Bank of Trinidad and Tobago, 1991.

== Awards ==
- 1987: BWIA Excellence in Journalism award
- 1996: Trinidad and Tobago Chaconia Medal Gold (for Literature, Education, and Culture)
- 2014: Bocas Henry Swanzy Award
