= List of Barbadian writers =

This is a list of Barbadian writers, including writers either from or associated with Barbados.

== A ==
- Adisa Andwele, rhythm poet from Barbados.

== B ==
- Hilary Beckles (born 1955)
- Kamau Brathwaite (1930–2020)
- Shakirah Bourne

== C ==
- Thomas Chenery (1826–1884)
- Austin Clarke (novelist) (1934–2016)
- Frank Collymore (1893–1980)
- Tony Cozier (1940–2016)
- Alissandra Cummins (born 1958)

== D ==
- Linda M. Deane
- Geoffrey Drayton (1924–2017)

== G ==
- Wyndham Gittens (1885–1967)

== K ==
- Agymah Kamau
- Anthony Kellman (born 1955)
- Odimumba Kwamdela (1942–2019)

== J ==
- Cherie Jones (born 1974)

== L ==
- George Lamming (1927–2022)
- Charles Leslie (writer)
- Karen Lord (born 1968)
- Glenville Lovell (born 1955)

== M ==
- Carl Moore
- Richard B. Moore (1893–1978)

== P ==
- Esther Phillips (born 1950)
- Margaret Prescod (living)
- Samuel Jackman Prescod (1806–1871)

== S ==
- Irene Sandiford-Garner (born 1961)
- Dorothea Smartt (born 1963)
- Andrea Stuart (born 1962)

== W ==
- Eric D. Walrond (1898–1966)
- Clennell Wickham (1895–1938)
- Cynthia Wilson (born 1934)
