= Edgar Mittelholzer =

Guyanese novelist (1909–1965)

- Born: Edgar Austin Mittelholzer; 16 December 1909; New Amsterdam, British Guiana (later Guyana)
- Died: 6 May 1965 (aged 55); Farnham Hospital, Farnham, Surrey, England
- Education: Berbice High School
- Occupation: Novelist
- Spouses: Roma Halfhide (m. 1942; div. 1959); Jacqueline Pointer (m. 1960)
- Children: 5

Edgar Austin Mittelholzer (16 December 1909 – 6 May 1965) was a Guyanese novelist. He is the earliest professional novelist from the English-speaking Caribbean. He was able to develop a readership in Europe and North America, as well as the Caribbean; and established himself in London, where he lived almost exclusively by writing fiction. He was considered in 1979 as "the most prolific novelist to be produced by the Caribbean".

Mittelholzer's novels include characters and situations from a variety of places within the Caribbean, and range in time from the early period of European settlement to the 20th century. They feature a cross-section of ethnic groups and social classes, dealing with subjects of historical, political, psychological, and moral interest. Though his work had been out of print since the 1980s, modern readers and writers have noted that his work has experienced a revival and critical reassessment since it began to be reissued in 2007.

Mittelholzer committed suicide by self-immolation in England in 1965.

== Early life ==
Born in New Amsterdam, British Guiana (later Guyana), Edgar Mittelholzer was the second son of William Austin Mittelholzer, a commercial clerk; and his wife Rosamond Mabel, née Leblanc, from Martinique. Born into a mixed but white-passing middle class family (his forebears were Swiss-German, French, British, and African Caribbean), Mittelholzer was singled out as "swarthy" and called "the Dark One" for his olive complexion. He was educated at Berbice High School, and at an early age seems to have reacted against his colonial Guyanese environment. He worked at various menial jobs while beginning to write and publish his work locally, his first publication being Creole Chips (1937).

The publication of his book Corentyne Thunder signalled the birth of the novel in Guyana. It was written in 1938 when Mittelholzer was aged 29, living and working at odd jobs in New Amsterdam. The manuscript was sent to England and had a perilous existence until finally it found a publisher, Eyre & Spottiswoode, in 1941. James Ferguson has described it as "a groundbreaking novel of racial tension and passion set in rural Guyana". Writing on the book, Sandra Lewis Williams compares Mittelholzer to Jean Rhys and Wilson Harris, and notes both the environmental and colonial concerns in the novel.

In December 1941, Mittelholzer left Guyana for Trinidad as a recruit in the Trinidad Royal Volunteer Naval Reserve (TRVNR) during the Second World War. He recalled his service in the TRVNR as "one of the blackest and most unpleasant interludes" in his life. Discharged on medical grounds in August 1942, he married Trinidadian Roma Halfhide in March 1942. He later left Trinidad in 1948, coming to England with his wife and daughter.

== Life in England ==
After leaving Trinidad in 1948, Mittelholzer spent the rest of his life in England, except for three years in Barbados. Through his colonial education and middle class upbringing, Mittelholzer saw himself as an Englishman even before he moved to the UK; he was often dismayed when the British saw him differently.

Mittelholzer's typing job at the British Council gave him access to many of the UK's top literary figures, including Leonard Woolf. Woolf's Hogarth Press would publish Mittelholzer's A Morning at the Office in 1950, which was set in Trinidad and included a diverse cast of characters, including Chinese, East Indian and Black Trinidadians, and a sympathetic portrayal of a gay man. The novel deals with colonial colourism and classism. Two more novels were published in 1951 and 1952, so Mittelholzer gave up his typist's job to become a full-time writer.

From 1952 to 1961, Mittelholzer published 13 books with Secker & Warburg. In 1952, he published Children of Kaywana, the first book in his ambitious and popular Kaywana trilogy, and described as Mittelholzer's "supreme achievement" by Guyanese scholar Dr. Frank Birbalsingh. In 1955, he published My Bones and My Flute: A Ghost Story in the Old-Fashioned Manner, an important example of the Caribbean Gothic genre and one of his most well regarded works. In 2022, the Caribbean Modern Classics edition of the book made it onto the BBC's list for the Big Jubilee Read for Queen Elizabeth II's platinum jubilee.

During the 1950s and '60s, Mittelholzer was also among a group of West Indian writers who regularly featured on BBC's Caribbean Voices programme, including Derek Walcott, George Lamming, V. S. Naipaul, Una Marson, Sylvia Wynter and Louise Bennett. During this time, he also travelled to Canada, spent three years in Barbados, and had four more children with Roma Halfhide. He eventually divorced her in 1959.

In 1959, on a coach to the Swanwick Writers' Summer School in Derbyshire, Mittelholzer met Jacqueline Pointer; they married in 1960. He was living in Maida Vale, London, at the time. In 1962, they had a son (Mittelholzer's fifth child overall).

Unwilling to hire an agent, Mittelholzer often struggled with money. He wrote quickly, using his advances to support his growing family. As Mittelholzer's work became (in his own words) increasingly "preachy" and right-wing, he struggled for a short time to get new work published in England—for which he blamed leftists and "would-rotters". He even attempted to use a pen name without luck.

However, in 1962, after Secker & Warburg rejected it, George Putnam published The Wounded and the Worried. The following year, Putnam published his autobiography, A Swarthy Boy: A Childhood in British Guiana, which scholar and publisher Jeremy Poynting argues was the first true Caribbean literary autobiography (when using a strict definition of the genre).

Mittelholzer would go on to have three more books published between 1963 and his death in 1965: Uncle Paul (1963), The Aloneness of Mrs Chatham (1965) and The Jilkington Drama (1965). The last was published posthumously.

== Death ==
A recurring theme in Mittelholzer's work, no fewer than 15 characters die by suicide in his novels. In his last novel (published posthumously), the main character commits suicide by self-immolation. On 5 May 1965, aged 55, the author set himself alight in a field near Farnham, Surrey. He died the next day at Farnham Hospital.

== Legacy ==
The Edgar Mittelholzer Lecture Series was started by A. J. Seymour two years after Mittelholzer's death and then took place sporadically. It is currently delivered annually under the auspices of the Department of Culture. In the words of the Guyana Chronicle: "This memorial lecture series, like the Guyana Prize for Literature, is unique throughout the Caribbean where it is seen as a welcome acknowledgement of the arts, the artist and artistic achievement. Whenever possible, therefore, a distinguished Guyanese is identified and asked to deliver the Mittelholzer Memorial Lecture, which is viewed with distinction and the entire literary community, including scholars and academics, consider it a command appearance."

In order to celebrate Edgar Mittelholzer's 100th birthday in 2009, writer, sculptor and artist Stanley Greaves hosted an event with readings and an art exhibition at the Guyana National Gallery. Greaves' own artwork was included: a series of paintings named after the Mittelholzer novel Shadows Move Among Them. Guyanese actor Marc Gomes also announced his plan to film an adaptation of Corentyne Thunder.

Writing in Newsday, Keith Jardim argues that, despite his death, "Mittelholzer’s contribution to building Caribbean civilisation in his accomplished works may have just begun", pointing to a growing interest in his work among readers, academics and artists/writers. Scholar Rupert Roopnaraine credits Peepal Tree Press for this revival, writing in a column for Stabroek News, “While it may be too early to speak of a Mittelholzer revival, there are encouraging signs of a reawakening of not only academic but wider general interest in the work of this prodigious pioneer of the Guyanese and Caribbean novel.”

Though many of Mittelholzer's books have remained out of print and difficult to obtain since the 1980s, Peepal Tree Press has reissued several of his books with new introductions as part of its Caribbean Modern Classics line (beginning in 2007). A number of unpublished short stories, poems and essays have also been published for the first time by Peepal Tree. Managing Editor Jeremy Poynting said of the reissued material, "I hope that our recovery of Edgar Mittelholzer’s earlier Caribbean work will reveal a much more serious and achieved writer than some of the previous criticism has suggested."

== Bibliography ==
- Creole Chips (1937, self-published), reissued as part of Creole Chips and Other Writings: Short Fiction, Poetry, Drama and Essays by Peepal Tree Press, 2018 ISBN 978-1-84523-300-6
- Corentyne Thunder (1941; London: Secker & Warburg), Peepal Tree Press, 2009, ISBN 978-1-84523-111-8
- A Morning at the Office (1950; London: Hogarth Press), Peepal Tree Press, 2010, ISBN 978-1-84523-066-1
- Shadows Move Among Them (1951; Philadelphia: Lippincott), Peepal Tree Press, 2010, ISBN 978-1-84523-091-3
- Children of Kaywana (1952; London: Secker & Warburg), ISBN 978-0-586-06491-7
- The Weather in Middenshot (1952; London: Secker & Warburg)
- The Life and Death of Sylvia (1953), Peepal Tree Press, 2010, ISBN 978-1-84523-120-0
- Kaywana Stock: The Harrowing of Hubertus (1954; London: Secker & Warburg), ISBN 978-0-450-00079-9
- The Adding Machine: A Fable for Capitalists and Commercialists (1954; Kingston: Pioneer Press), reissued as part of Creole Chips and Other Writings: Short Fiction, Poetry, Drama and Essays by Peepal Tree Press, 2018 ISBN 978-1-84523-300-6
- My Bones and My Flute (1955; London: Secker & Warburg), Peepal Tree Press, 2015 ISBN 978-1-84523-295-5
- Of Trees and the Sea (1956; London: Secker & Warburg)
- A Tale of Three Places (1957; London: Secker & Warburg)
- Kaywana Blood (1958; London: Secker & Warburg), ISBN 978-0-553-12376-0
- The Weather Family (1958; London: Secker & Warburg)
- With a Carib Eye (travel) (1958; London: Secker & Warburg, 1965)
- A Tinkling in the Twilight (1959; London: Secker & Warburg)
- Latticed Echoes (1960; London: Secker & Warburg)
- Eltonsbrody (1960; London: Secker & Warburg)
- The Mad MacMullochs (1961; London: Peter Owen)
- Thunder Returning (1961; London: Secker & Warburg)
- The Piling of Clouds (1961; London: Secker & Warburg)
- The Wounded and the Worried (1962; London: Putnam)
- A Swarthy Boy: A Childhood in British Guiana – autobiography (1963; London: Putnam), Peepal Tree Press, 2024, ISBN 978-1-84523-355-6
- Uncle Paul (1963; London: McDonald)
- The Aloneness of Mrs Chatham (1965; London: Library 33)
- The Jilkington Drama (1965; New York: Abelard-Schuman)

=== Collected Works ===
- Creole Chips and Other Writings: Short Fiction, Poetry, Drama and Essays, edited by Juanita Cox (2018; Leeds, UK: Peepal Tree Press) - includes previously published novellas Creole Chips and The Adding Machine, plus mostly unpublished works of the author: 24 short stories, five plays, his collected poetry, and selected essays.

== Criticism ==
- Birbalsingh, F. M., "Edgar Mittelholzer; novelist or pornographer?", in Journal of Commonwealth Literature, no. 7 (July 1969), pp. 80–103.
- Cartey, Wilfred, "The rhythm of society and landscape", in New World Quarterly, Guyana Independence Issue (1966), pp. 97–104.
- Collymore, Frank A., "A Biographical Sketch" in Bim, vol. 10, no. 41 (June/December 1965), pp. 23–6.
- Cox, Juanita (ed.), In the Eye of the Storm: Edgar Mittelholzer 1909–2009: Critical Perspectives (2024; Leeds, UK: Peepal Tree Press) ISBN 978-1-84523-128-6
- Gilkes, Michael, "The Spirit in the Bottle - a reading of Mittelholzer's A Morning at the Office", in World Literature Written in English vol. 14, no. 1 (April 1965), pp. 237–52.
- Guckian, Patrick, "The Balance of Colour - A reassessment of the work of Edgar Mittelholzer", in Jamaica Journal, vol. 4, no. 1 (March 1970), pp. 38–45.
- Seymour, A. J., "An Introduction to the Novels of Edgar Mittelholzer", in Kyk-Over-Al, vol. 8, no. 24 (December 1958), pp. 60–74.
- Sparer, Joyce L., "Attitudes towards 'Race' in Guyanese Literature", in Caribbean Studies, vol. 8, no. 2 (July 1968), pp. 23–63.
- Thieme, John, "Catching Mullet and Chasing Shadows: The Early Novels of Edgar Mittelholzer", Caribbean Review, vol. 8, no, 4 (1979), pp. 36–7 and 47-50.
- Thieme, John, "Introduction", Eltonsbrody, Valancourt Books, 2017, pp. v-ix.
