= Monica Skeete =

Grenadian poet (1923–1997)

- Born: Monica Agnes Martineau; 23 October 1923; Grenville, Grenada
- Died: 1997 (aged 73–74)
- Education: Queen's College; King's College, University of London
- Occupations: Poet, writer and teacher
- Notable work: Time Out (1978)

Monica Skeete (née Martineau; 23 October 1923 – 1997) was a Grenadian poet, writer and teacher. Her work was first published in the Barbadian literary magazine BIM in 1946. Her 1978 collection of short stories, Time Out, was published by Nelson Caribbean in their Authors of the Caribbean series, to support a growing educational market for Caribbean literature. Other short stories were anthologised in several publications. She also wrote novels. Much of her career was spent as a history teacher at Queen's College, Barbados. She died in 1997.

== Life ==
Monica Agnes Skeete (née Martineau) was born in Grenville, Grenada, on 23 October 1923 and was educated at the Church of England High School (later called the Anglican High School), Grenada, before she moved to Barbados, where her father lived, in 1937 for an education at Queen's College girls' school. After graduating from Queen's in 1942, she was awarded an Ext. B.A. Gen. in 1950 (in Latin, English and History) and took up a teaching post at Queen's College in 1951.

In 1956, she took study leave from her job and relocated to London, England, travelling with her then fiancé Harry Skeete, a Barbadian with plans for university study in London. The couple were married at Holborn Registry Office in September 1956 and lived in Hornsey, North London. In October 1956, Skeete entered King's College, University of London, where she gained a Postgraduate Diploma in Education and then a BA Hons in History.

Skeete went on to pursue a successful career in teaching, returning to teach at Queen's College in 1960, but also taking a posts at Modern Secondary Schools in London when she and Harry returned to London in 1962–3. Back in Barbados from 1963, Skeete taught at Queen's College from January 1964 until 1983, when she retired as the Head of History. From 1978, Skeete served on the Sub-Committee of the Caribbean Examinations Council. In her retirement, Monica spent some years in Harare, Zimbabwe, with her husband and became a passionate advocate of African Studies. Her argument, to Barbadians, that was that it "is important to us to explore and rediscover the African part of our heritage, which has been underplayed for so long".

== Writings ==
As well as writing short stories that were published in BIM, the now legendary regional literary little magazine edited from Barbados by Frank Collymore, Skeete had two poems broadcast on the BBC's Caribbean Voices programme under her maiden name (Martineau) in 1948, and in March 1958 her story "The Scholarship" was also broadcast. In a 1961 "Notebook" preface to BIM, Collymore refers to Skeete as "a short story writer of great promise and a teacher at Queen's College".

Time Out, her 70-page story collection, was published by Thomas Nelson and Sons Ltd as part of their Authors of the Caribbean series in 1978.

Skeete's stories are still in print in textbooks produced for the educational market in the Caribbean and many focus on the experience of children in educational settings. "The Scholarship", her first prose work, "based on Monica's teaching experience in Barbados" has also been her most enduring. It has been reprinted in Response: A Course in Narrative Comprehension and Composition for Caribbean Secondary Schools, edited by Cecil Gray (Thomas Nelson and Sons Ltd, 1969); Wavelengths: A Course in Narrative Comprehension and Composition for Caribbean Secondary Schools edited by Cecil Gray (Thomas Nelson and Sons Ltd, 1982); and is the opening story in Kaleidoscope anthology four, edited by Thelma Baker and Lorna Down (Oxford, Ginn, 2004). Three other of Skeete's short stories, "The Road", "Larry", and "Joe" (all first published in BIM), are included in Perspectives: A Course in Narrative Composition and Comprehension for Caribbean Secondary Schools, edited by Cecil Gray which is still in print, although originally published in 1982.

Skeete was closely involved in the Girl Guide movement in both Grenada and Barbados and wrote an account of "Guiding in Barbados, 1918–1968" for the Diamond Jubilee of Guiding in Barbados.

== Bibliography ==
Poems

Published under her maiden name Monica Martineau:

- "Two Pigs Going to the Slaughter", BIM (Vol. 2, No. 6, 1946): 43.
- "The New Men", BBC Caribbean Voices (Broadcast Sequence 181; 7 March 1948)
- "Evening on the Beach", BBC Caribbean Voices (Broadcast Sequence 212; 2 May 1948).

Published under Monica Skeete:

- "To Frank Collymore on His Eightieth Birthday." SAVACOU Special Issue "Tribute to Frank Collymore" (Nos. 7/8 January/June 1973): 122–124.

Short stories

- "The Return", BIM (Vol. 8, No. 31, July–December 1960): 141–5.
- "The Scholarship’ BIM (Vol. 8, No. 32, January–June 1961): 229–233.
- "Joe", BIM (Vol. 9, No. 34, Jan–June 1962):107-110.
- "The Spanish Figurine", BIM (Vol. 12, No. 46, January–June 1968): 70–74.
- "The Emigrant", BIM (Vol. 12, No. 47, July–December 1968): 196–201.
- "The Road", BIM (Vol. 13, No. 49, July–December 1969): ???
- "The Black Elephant", BIM (Vol. 13, No. 53, July–December 1971): 31–37.
- "Larry", BIM (Vol. 15, No. 63, January–June 1978): 193–204.

Short story collections

- Time Out (Thomas Nelson and Sons Ltd, Middlesex, 1978)

Papers and articles

- "Guiding in Barbados, 1918–1968" (ca. 1968), 17, ST1/C15/Shelf 1 Box 2: Barbados, GGL
- "African Studies, Please!", The Barbados Advocate (15 December 1997): 14–16.
