= In the Castle of My Skin =

1953 novel by George Lamming

- Cover of the UK first edition
- Author: George Lamming
- Cover artist: Denis Williams
- Language: English
- Subject: Coming-of-age novel
- Publisher: Michael Joseph
- Publication date: 1953
- Publication place: United Kingdom
- Media type: Print
- Followed by: The Emigrants

In the Castle of My Skin is the debut novel by Barbadian writer George Lamming, originally published in 1953 by Michael Joseph in England, and subsequently published by McGraw-Hill in the United States. The novel won the Somerset Maugham Award and was championed by prominent writers such as Jean-Paul Sartre and Richard Wright, the latter writing an introduction to the book's U.S. edition.

An autobiographical coming-of-age novel, set in the 1930s and 1940s in Carrington Village, Barbados, where the author was born and raised, In the Castle of My Skin follows the life of a young boy named G, against the backdrop of dramatic changes in the community where he lives. The book's title comes from a couplet in Derek Walcott's early work Epitaph for the Young: XII Cantos (1949): "You in the castle of your skin / I the swineherd."

A sequel by Lamming entitled The Emigrants, following the life of the same protagonist as he travels from Barbados to England, was published in 1954.

== Background ==
In the Castle of My Skin has been characterised by literary scholar Sandra Pouchet Paquet as an "autobiographical novel of childhood and adolescence written against the anonymity and alienation from self and community the author experienced in London at the age of twenty-three." Lamming himself described the context in which the novel was written:

Migration was not a word I would have used to describe what I was doing when I sailed with other West Indians to England in 1950. We simply thought we were going to an England that had been painted in our childhood consciousness as a heritage and a place of welcome. It is the measure of our innocence that neither the claim of heritage nor the expectation of welcome would have been seriously doubted. England was not for us a country with classes and conflicts of interest like the islands we left. It was the name of a responsibility whose origin may have coincided with the beginning of time (...)

Much of the substance of my first novel, In the Castle of My Skin, is an evocation of this tragic innocence. Nor was there, at the time of writing, any conscious effort on my part to emphasise the dimension of cruelty that had seduced, or driven, black people into such lasting bonds of illusion. It was not a physical cruelty. Indeed, the colonial experience of my generation was almost wholly without violence. It was a terror of the mind; a daily exercise in self-mutilation. Black versus black in a battle for self-improvement.

This was the breeding ground for every uncertainty of self. (...)

The novel was completed within two years of my arrival in London. I still shared in that innocence that had socialised us into seeing our relations to empire as a commonwealth of mutual interests....

== Critical reception ==
In the Castle of My Skin has been widely praised and analysed since its first publication, receiving more critical attention than any of Lamming's other works. Introducing the American edition, American writer Richard Wright spoke of "Lamming's quietly melodious prose", while Kenyan writer Ngũgĩ wa Thiong'o saw the book as "a study of colonial revolt" and "one of the great political novels in modern 'colonial' literature".

A 10-part radio abridgement of the novel adapted Florence Bedell, produced by Clive Brillby and read by Paterson Joseph on BBC Radio 4 was first broadcast in December 2020.

In the Castle of My Skin was included on the "Big Jubilee Read" list of 70 books selected by a panel of experts, and announced in April 2022 by the BBC and The Reading Agency, to celebrate Queen Elizabeth II's platinum jubilee in June 2022.
