= Kyk-Over-Al (magazine) =

Literary magazine published in Guyana

- Categories: Guyanese literature
- Founder: British Guiana Writers' Association (BGWA); British Guiana Union of Cultural Clubs (BGUCC)
- Founded: 1945; 80 years ago
- First issue: December 1945
- Country: Guyana
- Language: English

Kyk-Over-Al (sometimes written as Kykoveral and often informally abbreviated to Kyk) is a literary magazine published in Guyana (formerly British Guiana), and is one of the three pioneering literary magazines founded in the 1940s that helped define postwar West Indian literature (the other two were Bim, published in Barbados and still in existence today under the editorship of Esther Phillips, and Focus, published in Jamaica). Kyk-Over-Al is indelibly associated with the Guyanese poet and editor A. J. Seymour, the magazine's longtime editor. After Seymour's death in 1989 the editorship was assumed by poet and novelist Ian McDonald.

Kyk-Over-Al was "a forerunner in its efforts to stimulate a Caribbean theory and practice of literary criticism, addressing such issues as language and the use of vernacular, audience, the influence of metropolitan culture and the role of historical awareness in establishing a shared 'West Indian' identity." The magazine was initially published between 1945 and 1961, ceasing publication shortly before the West Indies Federation broke up, and was revived in 1984.

== Founding and early years (1945–61) ==
Kyk-Over-Al was founded in 1945 by the British Guiana Writers' Association (BGWA) and the British Guiana Union of Cultural Clubs (BGUCC), to "be an instrument to help forge a Guianese people, and to make them conscious of their intellectual and spiritual possibilities". The first issue, priced at one shilling, appeared in December 1945, and was edited by A. J. Seymour, who at that time was an executive member of the BGWA and honorary secretary of the BGUCC.

The magazine was named for Kyk-Over-Al ("see over all"), the ruined Dutch fort on a small island near the confluence of the Essequibo, Mazaruni, and Cuyuni Rivers in the Guyanese interior. As Seymour explained in his editorial notes, "although ruined, Kykoveral still stands to remind us of our Amerindian and Dutch heritage.... As a title for a periodical, Kykoveral calls for a quick and wide vigilance and the expression of an alert people." (Seymour almost always spelled the name of the magazine as a single word, unhyphenated; but the hyphenated form Kyk-Over-Al appeared on the magazine's cover, and this is the form that has been generally accepted over the years.)

Though Kyk-Over-Al began as a project of the BGWA and the BGUCC, Seymour from the beginning took a leading role in its direction and the magazine soon became his own private project—or, it might be more accurate to say it became a Seymour family project, since his wife Elma assumed responsibility for many business matters, including the advertising that made publication possible.

Between 1945 and 1961, 28 issues of Kyk-Over-Al appeared, publishing the work of every important Guyanese writer of the period—most notably Wilson Harris, Edgar Mittelholzer, Martin Carter, and Seymour himself—as well as many writers from other territories of the Anglophone Caribbean. Apart from fiction and poetry, Kyk-Over-Al published a number of groundbreaking critical essays, many written by Seymour, examining the work of West Indian writers and attempting to define the literature that began to emerge in the Caribbean in the years after World War II. Other notable critics who contributed to the magazine include Frank Collymore, Ivan Van Sertima and Kenneth Ramchand.

In 1962, Seymour, by profession a civil servant, resigned from his position as head of government information services after a disagreement with Premier Cheddi Jagan over the political implications of his role. He accepted a post with the Caribbean Organisation, based in Puerto Rico. When he left British Guiana, Kyk-Over-Al ceased publication.

In The Making of Guyanese Literature, a long essay Seymour wrote in 1980, he noted that "the main emphases in Kykoveral were on poetry and criticism.... The issues presented a total of nearly 500 poems in all and several numbers were devoted to anthologies of Guyanese and West Indian poetry." The Kyk-Over-Al Anthology of West Indian Poetry revised by A. J. Seymour, was published in 1957.

== Revival (1984–present) ==
Seymour returned to British Guiana in 1965 (the year before independence, when the territory was renamed Guyana), but did not resume the publication of Kyk-Over-Al. Over the next two decades he continued his cultural activities in various official and unofficial roles, and continued to write both poetry and criticism, as well as a series of autobiographical volumes.

In 1984, to commemorate Seymour's 70th birthday as well as his long and crucial involvement in West Indian literary affairs, a volume called AJS at 70 was published, edited by Ian McDonald. This proved to be a trigger for the revival of Kyk-Over-Al, with McDonald assisting Seymour in the editorial duties.

Seymour died in December 1989, after which McDonald became sole editor of Kyk-Over-Al, which continued to appear, somewhat irregularly, through the 1990s. In June 1990, a joint issue of Kyk-Over-Al and BIM was published, edited by John Wickham and Ian McDonald; it was noted by a reviewer: "Perhaps most striking about this joint issue is the ability of Ian McDonald to provide so much material, and very interesting material at that, in 'Across the Editor's Desk.' Seymour has clearly left a good heir in him." For recent issues, writer and cultural activist Vanda Radzik has served as co-editor of Kyk-Over-Al. A 50th-anniversary issue appeared in 1995. The most recent published issue appeared in June 2000.

Although Kyk-Over-Al has not been published since then, the editors insist that the magazine is not defunct, and in 2005 work was under way on a 60th-anniversary issue.

== See also ==
- Bim
- Savacou
