= The Beacon (magazine) =

1930s magazine published in Trinidad

The Beacon was a Caribbean "little magazine" published in Trinidad monthly from March 1931 to November 1933, and briefly revived in 1939. The main names associated with the magazine were Albert M. Gomes, C. L. R. James and Alfred H. Mendes, who formed the core of what was known as "the Beacon group", regarded as having "shaped a nascent Trinidadian literary consciousness in the 1930s". Among other notable writers and artists associated with the influential group were Ralph de Boissière and Hugh Stollmeyer.

Preceded by the short-lived pioneering literary magazine Trinidad (which made two appearances, in 1929 and 1930), The Beacon "marked the emergence of Trinidadian short story and the beginning of national literature in Trinidad", one of its achievements being "to encourage West Indian writers to examine their own societies, and to discard Eurocentric preconceptions and literary conventions." Discussing the contribution to Trinidad and The Beacon, Reinhard Sander writes in The Trinidad Awakening: West Indian Literature of the Nineteen-Thirties (1988): "In choosing the subjects for their short fiction, the writers put into practice their theoretical demands that West Indian writing should utilize West Indian settings, speech, characters, and conflicts."

The Beacon is among the local publications regarded as pivotal to the emergence of Caribbean literature in English, alongside BIM and Kyk-Over-Al, both founded in the 1940s.

== Legacy ==
New Beacon Books in London, which was the first Caribbean publishing house in England, founded in 1966 by John La Rose and Sarah White, was named after the journal.

== See also ==
- BIM, first published 1942 in Barbados
- Kyk-Over-Al, first published 1945 in British Guiana
