= Skarstedt (surname) =

Skarstedt is a surname. Notable people with the surname include:

- Ernst Skarstedt (1857–1929), Swedish-American author, journalist and editor
- Georg Skarstedt (1900–1976), Swedish actor
- Sonja Skarstedt (1960–2009), Canadian poet, short story, playwright writer, painter, and illustrator
