= Geof Isherwood =

American painter & comics artist (born 1960)

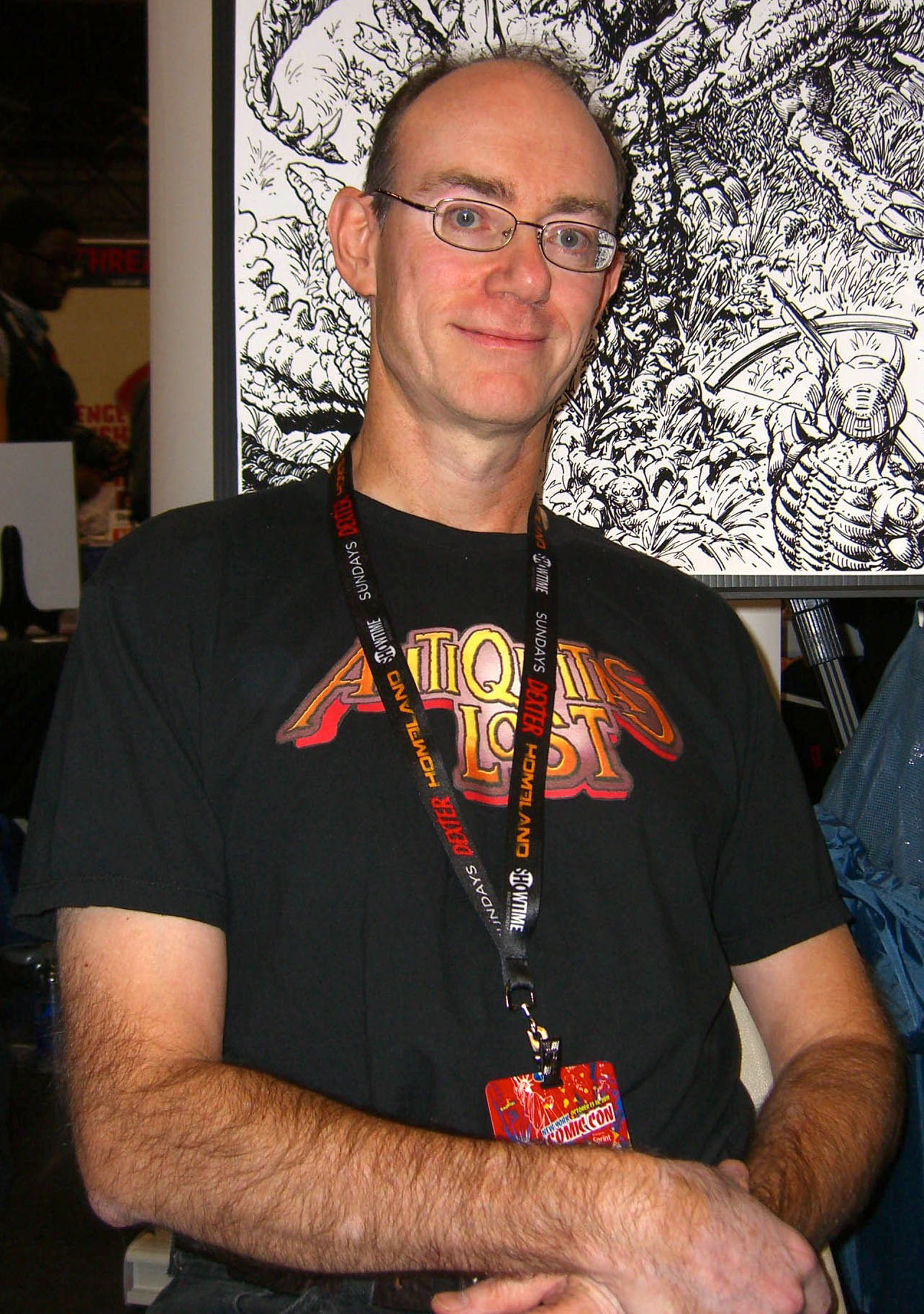
- Isherwood at the 2011 New York Comic Con.
- Born: December 4, 1960 (age 65) Quantico, Virginia, U.S.
- Areas: Writer, Penciller, Inker
- Notable works: Doctor Strange

Geof Isherwood (born December 4, 1960) is an American painter, sculptor and comic book illustrator.

== Early life ==
Geof Isherwood was born in Quantico, Virginia and attended John Abbott College and received a Bachelor of Fine Arts degree from Concordia University in 1982.

== Career ==
Much of Isherwood's early work was done for Marvel Comics, including such titles as Conan the Barbarian, Conan the King, Doctor Strange, The 'Nam, and Namor, the Sub-Mariner. He drew the Suicide Squad series for DC Comics'. After largely leaving the comics industry, he has been involved in movies as a storyboard artist and a concepts/production illustrator, working with the likes of Bryan Singer, Richard Donner and Darren Aronofsky. He has also painted and designed covers for Canadian publishers, including Ann Diamond's Dead White Males (2000) and Sand for Snow (2003) by Robert Edison Sandiford. In 2011, Isherwood illustrated and prepared the cover for the American novel Antiquitas Lost, by author Robert Louis Smith. A selection of his paintings based on the Greek gods were featured in issue #59 of the publication Matrix. In 1997, he created Lincoln-16 (Skarwood Productions), a science fiction saga whose first two issues he wrote, drew, painted, and produced. Isherwood continues to work in the comic book field on a number of independent projects. As of 2025, he is collaborating with Sara Frazetta on a Fire and Ice: Nekron one-shot for Dynamite Entertainment.

== Personal life ==
In June 1988, Isherwood married poet Sonja Skarstedt. She died in 2009 from cancer. Isherwood is now married to Amanda Muise of Pubnico, Nova Scotia.

== Teaching ==
Isherwood taught advanced comic book, figure drawing, and concept art classes and workshops at Syn Studio Concept Art School from 2010 to 2013 an industry-focused art school based in Montreal, Quebec. In 2015, he began teaching part-time at Algonquin College in Ottawa, Ontario, in the School of Media and Design.

== Bibliography ==
=== Broadway Comics ===
- Knights on Broadway #1–3 (1996)
- Star Seed #7 (1996)

=== DC Comics ===
- New Talent Showcase #3 (1984)
- Suicide Squad #33–43, 45–51, 53–66 (1989–1992)

=== Dynamite Entertainment ===
- Fire and Ice: Nekron #1 (2025)

=== Marvel Comics ===
- The Amazing Spider-Man #421 (1997)
- The Avengers #370 (1994)
- Bizarre Adventures #33 (1982)
- Conan the Barbarian #166, 191–200, 202–203, 206–208 (1985–1988)
- Conan the King #22–28, 30–31, 50–55 (1984–1989)
- Conan the Savage #5–6 (1995–1996)
- Conan: Flame and the Fiend #1–3 (2000)
- Conan: River of Blood #1–3 (1998)
- Cosmic Powers Unlimited #2–3 (1995)
- Daredevil #203, 224, 239 (1984–1987)
- Dazzler #34, 36 (1984–1985)
- Doctor Strange, Sorcerer Supreme #16–17, 20, 26–27, 37–59, Annual #3 (1990–1993)
- Fantastic Force #9 (1995)
- Fantastic Four Annual #23 (1990)
- G.I. Joe: A Real American Hero #20, 97 (1984–1990)
- Guardians of the Galaxy #60 (1995)
- Justice #1–4, 6–8 (1986–1987)
- Marvel Comics Presents #146 (Doctor Strange) (1994)
- Marvel Graphic Novel #17 ("Revenge of the Living Monolith") (1985)
- Moon Knight vol. 2 #6 (1985)
- The 'Nam #15–22, 24–26, 28, 30–35, 37–39, 41 (1988–1990)
- Namor, the Sub-Mariner #44–50, 52–62 (1993–1995)
- The New Mutants #85 (1990)
- Peter Parker: Spider-Man vol. 2 #12 (1999)
- Power Man and Iron Fist #101, 107 (1984)
- Savage Sword of Conan #105, 119–121, 124–125, 145, 233 (1984–1995)
- Silver Surfer vol. 3 #110 (1995)
- The Spectacular Spider-Man #100 (1985)
- Star Brand Annual #1 (1987)
- Swords of the Swashbucklers #5–8, 10, 12 (1986–1987)
- Thor #369, 451–458, 495, Annual #17 (1986–1996)
- Web of Spider-Man #8–9, Annual #2 (1985–1986)
- West Coast Avengers Annual #1 (1986)
- X-Factor Annual #5 (1990)
- X-Men Annual #14 (1990)

=== NBM Publishing ===
- Sizzle #41–42 (2009)

=== Skarwood Productions ===
- Lincoln-16 #1–2 (1997)

Preceded by Ernie Chan	Conan the Barbarian inker 1987–1988	Succeeded by Alfredo Alcala
Preceded by Luke McDonnell	Suicide Squad penciller 1990–1992	Succeeded by n/a
Preceded by Dan Lawlis	Doctor Strange, Sorcerer Supreme penciller 1991–1993	Succeeded by Mel Rubi
Preceded by M.C. Wyman	Namor the Sub-Mariner penciller 1993–1995	Succeeded by n/a
