= Karl Moore =

Karl Moore may refer to:

- Karl Moore (fighter) (born 1991), Northern Irish mixed martial artist
- Karl Moore (footballer) (born 1988), Irish footballer
- Karl Moore (academic), associate professor at McGill University

== See also ==
- Karl Moor (1853–1932), Swiss banker
- Carl Moore, Barbadian jazz critic and journalist
- Carl Richard Moore (1892–1955), American endocrinologist
