= Ian McDonald (Guyanese writer) =

Trinidadian-Guyanese writer and poet (1933–2026)

Ian McDonald FRSL, AA
- Born: 18 April 1933; St Augustine, Trinidad, Colony of Trinidad and Tobago
- Died: 24 July 2026 (aged 93); Toronto, Ontario, Canada
- Education: Clare College, Cambridge University
- Occupations: Poet and writer
- Notable work: The Humming-Bird Tree (1969)
- Relatives: Hilda McDonald (grandmother); Arthur McDonald (uncle)

Ian Archie McDonald FRSL, AA (18 April 1933 – 24 July 2026) was a poet and writer who described himself as "Antiguan by ancestry, Trinidadian by birth, Guyanese by adoption, and West Indian by conviction". His ancestry on his father's side was Antiguan and Kittitian, and Trinidadian on his mother's side. His only novel, The Humming-Bird Tree, first published in 1969, is considered a classic of Caribbean literature. He won the Guyana Prize for Literature three times for his poetry. He also received an honorary Doctor of Letters from the University of the West Indies and a Theatre Guild of Guyana Lifetime Achievement Award.

== Early life and education ==
Ian McDonald was born on 18 April 1933, in St Augustine, Trinidad, where his mother, Thelma McDonald (née Seheult), was born, and where his father, John Archie McDonald (who was born in Saint Kitts and whose parents were born in Antigua), was Agricultural Director of Gordon Grant Limited. His uncle was Air Marshal Sir Arthur McDonald of the Royal Air Force. He had four sisters – Heather Murray, Gillian Howie, Robin McDonald and Monica Purkis – and one brother, Archie McDonald. McDonald's grandmother was poet and politician Hilda McDonald, first woman member of the Antiguan House of Assembly.

McDonald received his secondary education at Queen's Royal College (1942–51) in Port of Spain, where he obtained distinctions in History and English in the Higher School Certificate. He attended Clare College, Cambridge University (1951–55), where he obtained a BA Honours degree in History and later received his MA. He was elected President of the Cambridge University West Indian Society.

== Career in Guyana ==
=== Sugar industry ===
In 1955, he went to the then British Guiana with the Booker Group, working first as secretary of the Bookers BG Group Committee and later as secretary of Bookers Sugar Estates, where he rose to be administrative director. When Bookers was nationalised in 1976 he remained with the Guyana Sugar Corporation where he held the post of Director of Marketing and Administration from 1976 until retirement in 1999. He represented Guyana and CARICOM on innumerable occasions at international conferences and forums on the sugar industry.

At the regional level he was involved with the Sugar Association of the Caribbean as Chairman of Marketing from 1990, then CEO from 1999 until retiring in 2007. In November 1995, he delivered an address and presented a paper on "The Sugar Industries of the English-Speaking Caribbean" to the International Sugar Organization in London. He was also Chairman of Demerara Sugar Terminals, which exports Guyana's sugar. For 35 years he was a member of the Sugar Industry Labour Welfare Fund Committee, which provides land and housing, water supply, and welfare facilities for sugar workers.

=== Guyanese business and interest ===
In 1991/92, McDonald held the position of Editorial Consultant with the West Indian Commission, chaired by Sir Shridath Ramphal. His job was to assist in drafting and producing the commission's report, Time for Action. To assist in the work of the Commission he prepared a monograph, Bedrock of a Nation: Cultural Foundations of West Indian Integration.

In 1996, he was selected as an inaugural member of the West Indies 2000 Group, a "think-tank" of 40 West Indian personalities that had no agenda except to encourage the reality of a West Indian identity and the strengthening of the values of a West Indian heritage.

McDonald was a member of the Guyana National Advisory Committee on External Negotiations. He held directorships at Hand-in-Hand Fire and Life Insurance Companies, the Hand-in-Hand Trust Company, Woodlands Diagnostic & Imaging Centre Inc, the Institute of Private Enterprise Development, St. Joseph Mercy Hospital (2000–2006), and was a Trustee of the St. John Boscoe Orphanage for Boys. McDonald was a member, from 2009, of the Council of Schoolnet Guyana, dedicated to the computerization of schools in Guyana.

== Sporting activities ==
McDonald was junior tennis champion of Trinidad and Tobago for many years and first represented that country at the senior level at the age of 16. He played at Wimbledon in the 1950s (the only player from Trinidad or from Guyana to do so). He captained Cambridge University in 1955. He represented Oxford-Cambridge against Harvard-Yale in the Prentice Cup in America in 1952 and in England in 1954. From 1956 to the early 1970s, he was champion of Guyana and captained the Guyana Lawn Tennis team. In 1957, he was British Guiana's "Sportsman of the Year" with George De Peana. He also represented and captained Guyana in squash. He represented the West Indies in its first ever Davis Cup team in 1953 and went on to play for and captain the West Indies Davis Cup team later in the 1950s and in the 1960s. He also served as Secretary of the Commonwealth Caribbean Lawn Tennis Association for a number of years.

He received the Guyana National Sports Commission Award for Outstanding Contribution to the Development of Sports in Guyana, in 2006 and the Guyana Olympic Association Award for Contribution to the Development of Sport in General and Lawn Tennis in particular, in 2007.

McDonald had the unusual distinction of representing his country in five different decades: tennis (Trinidad) in the 1940s; tennis (Trinidad, Guyana, the West Indies) in the 1950s; tennis (Guyana, the West Indies) in the 1960s; tennis and squash (Guyana) in the 1970s; squash (Guyana) in the 1980s.

=== Sport research ===
McDonald was a member, with P. J. Patterson and Sir Alister McIntyre, of the panel set up by the West Indies Cricket Board in 2007 to report and make recommendations on the governance of West Indies cricket. This report was submitted to the West Indies Cricket Board in October 2007. He assisted in the compilation, editing and production of Cricket at Bourda, celebrating the Georgetown Cricket Club, in time for the World Cup, March 2007. In 2010, he and Dr. Stewart Brown published the anthology The Bowling Was Superfine – West Indian Writing and West Indian Cricket (Leeds, UK: Peepal Tree Press, 2010).

== Literary activities ==
For his literary work, McDonald was elected a Fellow of the Royal Society of Literature in 1970 and received the Golden Arrow of Achievement Guyana National Award in 1986. In 1997, he received an honorary Doctor of Letters from the University of the West Indies, and in 2013, he received the Theatre Guild of Guyana Lifetime Achievement Award.

=== Fiction ===
McDonald's novel The Humming-Bird Tree was first published by Heinemann in 1969, when it won the Winifred Holtby Memorial Prize (now known as the Ondaatje Prize) from the Royal Society of Literature for best regional novel. It was re-issued as a paperback in the Heinemann Caribbean Writers series in 1974, and has been widely used as a textbook in schools in the region and abroad. The BBC made a film of The Humming-Bird Tree for broadcast at Christmas 1992, and in the same year Heinemann re-issued the novel in a new edition. In 2006, Macmillan published a new edition of The Humming-Bird Tree.

McDonald also wrote short stories and his work has appeared in anthologies, most recently in the Faber Book of Contemporary Caribbean Stories and in Whispers from the cotton tree root: Caribbean fabulist fiction.

=== Theatre ===
McDonald's one-act play The Tramping Man, first produced at the Theatre Guild in Guyana in October 1969, has been staged throughout the West Indies and in London. It was published in 1976 in A Time and A Season (Carifesta/University of the West Indies' School of Continuing Studies, 1976), a collection of eight Caribbean plays, edited by Erroll Hill.

=== Poetry ===
McDonald's first poems were published in the 1950s and over the years his poems have appeared in a number of West Indian journals, particularly BIM, Kyk-Over-Al, The Caribbean Writer, The New Voices, The Trinidad And Tobago Review, Poui, The Caribbean Review of Books and Jamaica Journal as well as in Planet, Outposts, Voices, and other magazines in Britain and America. His poems have also appeared in many of the anthologies dedicated to the Caribbean region, including Caribbean Poetry Now, Voiceprint, The Graham House Review issue on West Indian Poetry, the "Archipelago" issue of Conjunctions, the "Caribbean Poetry" issue of the Atlanta Review and the Heinemann Book of Caribbean Poetry.

In 1975, Faber & Faber published 11 of McDonald's poems in their anthology Poetry Introduction 3. He published his first set of Selected Poems in 1983 and the collection Mercy Ward in 1988. He was awarded The Caribbean Writer's Prize for Poetry in 1991 and 2007. In 1992, he published Essequibo (Peterloo Poets/Story Line Press), which won the Guyana Prize for Literature 1992. He followed this with Jaffo the Calypsonian in 1994, which collected much of his earlier work from literary magazines and journals. In December 2003, he published Between Silence and Silence, for which he won the Guyana Prize for Literature again in 2004.

McDonald's second set of Selected Poems, edited and with an introduction by Professor Edward Baugh, was published by Macmillan in 2008, in honour of his 75th birthday. This book was shortlisted for the Royal Society of Literature Ondaatje Prize in 2009. He published The Comfort of All Things in 2012, which also won the Guyana Prize for Literature, and River Dancer in 2016.

In 2018, McDonald published New and Collected Poems: Ian McDonald with Peepal Tree Press, which brought together all the poet's published work from 1957 to 2017, including his earlier collections and over 100 pages of new poems written by the poet in his 80s. In 2025, he published Chasing the Marbleu. One of the poems from this collection was highly commended by the Forward Poetry Prize and was published in The Forward Book of Poetry 2026.

=== Editing ===
In 1984, McDonald edited the book AJS at 70 in honour of Guyana's great man of letters A. J. Seymour's 70th birthday. McDonald helped to edit and wrote the foreword for the first edition of Martin Carter's definitive Selected Poems published in 1989 by Demerara Publishers in Georgetown, and later in a new edition by the Red Thread Press in 1997.

In 1998, McDonald edited They Came in Ships: An Anthology of Indo-Guyanese Prose and Poetry with Joel Benjamin, Lakshmi Kallicharan and Lloyd Seawar.

==== Kyk-Over-Al ====
In 1984, McDonald was instrumental in reviving the literary magazine Kyk-Over-Al, which had first been published in Guyana between 1954 and 1961, and was joint editor, with A. J. Seymour, until Seymour's death in 1989, after which McDonald continued to edit the magazine with Vanda Radzik.

In June 1990, a joint issue of Kyk-Over-Al and BIM was published, co-edited by McDonald with John Wickham. Reviewing it in The Caribbean Writer, Cedric Lindo said: "Perhaps most striking about this joint issue is the ability of Ian McDonald to provide so much material, and very interesting material at that, in 'Across the Editor's Desk.' Seymour has clearly left a good heir in him."

The 50th Anniversary issue to Kyk-over-Al, No. 46/47, was published in December 1995. In the Guyana 1997 National Honours List, Kyk-Over-Al received the Group Medal of Service for its outstanding contribution to literature.

=== Arts organizations ===
From its inception in 1980, he was a director of the Theatre Company of Guyana, which during the period 1980–2001 produced nearly 100 plays, musicals and revues and promoted the careers of many of Guyana's leading theatrical talents. He was a member of the Board of Trustees of the Theatre Guild of Guyana. From 1987, he was a member of the first Management Committee of the Guyana Prize for Literature and was chairman of Demerara Publishers Limited, which produced and printed 36 books by Guyanese writers between 1987 and 1992.

Between 1990 and 1995, he was a member of the Guyana Book Foundation, which encourages the wide distribution of books and the establishment of small publishers. He was also a member of the National Archives Advisory Committee. He was the Regional Chairman (Canada and Caribbean) on the panel of judges for the 1991 Commonwealth Writers' Prize. He was a member of the Management Committee of the Castellani House National Art Collection in Guyana.

From 2006, he was a member of the Guyana National Nominating Committee for the Anthony N. Sagba Caribbean Awards for Excellence. Beginning in 2009, he was consulting editor for the Guyana Classics, a series of books to be republished by the Caribbean Press funded by the government of Guyana.

=== News media ===
McDonald was a regular contributor of articles on government, current affairs, problems of the Third World, education, literature, and sport in the newspapers. He wrote a weekly column, "Ian on Sunday", for the Stabroek News from the time when the newspaper started publication in Guyana in 1986. His columns also appeared in The Nation in Barbados, The Gleaner in Jamaica and the Trinidad and Tobago Review. He also contributed to Outlet in Antigua. He contributed more than 400 Viewpoints and Sports Views on the radio to these two GBC series. His writings on cricket in particular gained widespread regional notice. In January 2009, he was appointed Chairman of Guyana Publications Inc., publishers of Stabroek News. Poems from his Stabroek News column were published in A Love of Poetry, while his selected sports essays were published in An Abounding Joy.

=== Lectures ===
In 2005, McDonald gave the inaugural lecture entitled "Cricket: a Hunger in the West Indian soul" at the London Metropolitan University in the Sir Frank Worrell lecture series. On 10 January 2009, at the Frank Collymore Literary Awards ceremony in Barbados, he gave the address entitled "I Shake Hands With You in My Heart".

In November 2014, his literary archives were donated to the Alma Jordan Library at the University of the West Indies (UWI), St Augustine.

== Personal life and death ==
McDonald had a son, Keith, from his first marriage to Myrna Foster, from whom he was divorced. He was later married to Mary Callender and they had two sons: Jamie and Darren. McDonald died on 24 July 2026, at the age of 93.

== Honours and awards ==
- A Fellow of the Royal Society of Literature (FRSL) since 1970.
- Guyana National Honour, Golden Arrow of Achievement in 1986.
- Honorary Degree of Doctor of Letters (D.Litt.), in recognition of his services to Caribbean sugar, sport and literature from the University of the West Indies, St. Augustine Campus in 1997.
- Wordsworth McAndrew Award 2004 from the Guyana Cultural Association, New York.
- Inducted into the Queen's Royal College Hall of Honour in 2004.
- Honoured by the Friends of Mr Biswas, an NGO in Trinidad dedicated to the preservation and development of the Naipaul House Literary Museum on Nepaul Street, St James in 2014.

== Publications ==
- Sugar in B.G: Challenge and Change – Georgetown, Guyana: New World Publications, 1965.
- Poetry Introduction 3 – London: Faber & Faber, 1975.
- The Tramping Man in A Time and A Season (edited by Errol Hill) – Carifesta/University of the West Indies' School of Continuing Studies, 1976. First staged in 1969.
- Selected Poems – Georgetown: Labour Advocate, 1984.
- Editor of AJS at 70 – Georgetown: Autoprint, 1984.
- Mercy Ward – collection of poems published by Peterloo Poets, UK, ISBN 978-0905291956, 1992. Republished as Guyana Classics series, Caribbean Press, December 2010.
- Essequibo – collection of poems published by Peterloo Poets (UK) and Story Line Press (US), 1992, ISBN 9781871471342. Winner of the Guyana Prize for Literature 1992.
- Monograph, Bedrock of a Nation: Cultural Foundations of West Indian Integration – for West Indian Commission, 1992.
- Contribution as Editorial Assistant: Time For Action: Report of the West Indian Commission, 1992.
- Heinemann Book of Caribbean Poetry (edited jointly with Stewart Brown) – London: Heinemann, 1992.
- Jaffo the Calypsonian (poems) – Leeds, UK: Peepal Tree Press, 1994.
- Between Silence and Silence (poems) – Leeds: Peepal Tree Press, 2003 (winner of the Guyana Prize for Literature 2004).
- The Humming-Bird Tree (novel) – London: Heinemann, 1969; Macmillan, 2004; filmed by the BBC in 1992.
- A. J. Seymour, Collected Poems 1937–1989 (edited with Jacqueline de Weever) – New York: Blue Parrot Press, 2000.
- Foreword to Selected Poems of Martin Carter – Demerara Publishers, 1989; revised edition, Red Thread Women's Press, 1997.
- They Came in Ships: An Anthology of Indo-Guyanese Prose and Poetry (compiled and edited with Lloyd Searwar, Laxshmi Kallicharan and Joel Benjamin) – Leeds: Peepal Tree Press, 1998.
- Poems by Martin Carter (edited jointly with Dr. Stewart Brown) – London: Macmillan, September 2006.
- Contributed to Caribbean Despatches – London: Macmillan, 2006.
- Contributed to the Faber Book of Contemporary Caribbean Stories – London: Faber & Faber, 1990.
- Cricket at Bourda (compiled with Paul Chan-A-Sue) – Georgetown: Sheik Hassan Printery, 2007.
- The Patterson Report: Final Report of the Governance Committee on West Indies Cricket (joint author with Hon. P. J. Patterson and Sir Alister McIntyre) – Kingston, Jamaica: West Indies Cricket Board, 2007.
- Selected Poems – Macmillan, 2008.
- The Bowling Was Superfine – West Indian Writing and West Indian Cricket (edited jointly with Stewart Brown) – Leeds, UK: Peepal Tree Press, 2010; paperback 2012, ISBN 978-1845230548.
- Ian McDonald’s New and Collected Poems – Leeds, UK: Peepal Tree Press, 2018.
- Not Quite Without a Moon – Leeds, UK: Peepal Tree Press, 2023.
- Chasing the Marbleu – Leeds, UK: Peepal Tree Press, 2024.
- The Impossibility of Nothingness – Leeds, UK: Peepal Tree Press, 2026.
