= Michael Anthony (author) =

Trinidadian author and historian (1930–2023)

Michael Anthony HBM
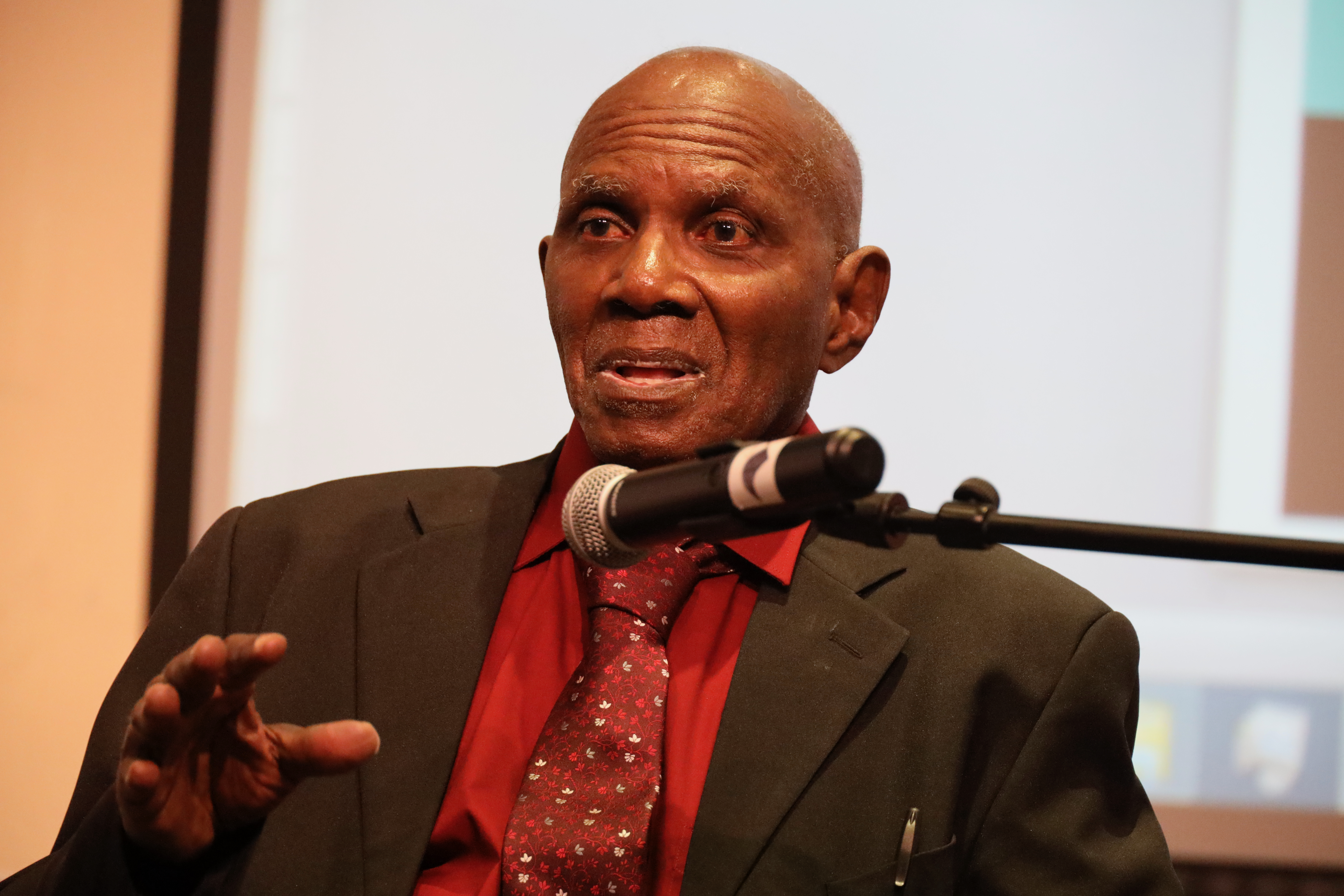
- Anthony in 2020
- Born: 10 February 1930; Mayaro, Trinidad and Tobago
- Died: 24 August 2023 (aged 93); Port of Spain, Trinidad and Tobago
- Occupations: Author, historian
- Spouse: Yvette Phillips (m. 1958)
- Children: 4

Michael Anthony HBM (10 February 1930 – 24 August 2023) was a Trinidad and Tobago author and historian, who was named by CNC3 as one of the "50 most influential people in Trinidad and Tobago".

== Early life and education ==
Born in the county of Mayaro, Trinidad, on 10 February 1930, to Nathaniel Anthony and Eva Jones Lazarus, Michael Anthony was educated on the island at Mayaro Roman Catholic School and Junior Technical College in San Fernando. He subsequently took a job as a laundry worker in Pointe-à-Pierre for five years but had ambitions to become a journalist. Poems of his were published by the Trinidad Guardian in 1954; hHowever, it was not enough to secure him a new job locally and Anthony decided to further his career in the United Kingdom.

== Career outside Trinidad ==
Anthony's voyage to the UK on board the Hildebrandt took place in December 1954. In England, he held several jobs, including as a sub-editor at Reuters news agency (1964–1968), while developing his career as a writer, writing short stories for the BBC radio programme Caribbean Voices.

In 1958, he married Yvette Phillips and they had four children — Jennifer, Keith, Carlos and Sandra.

Four years later, Anthony published his first book, The Games Were Coming, a cycling story inspired by real events. He followed up its success with The Year in San Fernando and Green Days by the River. He eventually returned to Trinidad in 1970, after spending two years as part of the Trinidadian diplomatic corps in Brazil, where his novel King of the Masquerade is set, and he worked variously as an editor, a researcher for the Ministry of Culture, and as a radio broadcaster of historical programmes. In 1992, he spent time at the University of Richmond in the U.S. state of Virginia, teaching creative writing.

In his five-decade career, Anthony had more than 30 titles published, including novels, collections of short fiction, books for younger readers, travelogues and histories. He was also a contributor to many anthologies and journals, including Caribbean Prose, Island Voices, Stories from the Caribbean, Response, The Sun's Eyes, West Indian Narrative, The Bajan, and BIM magazine.

== Death ==
Michael Anthony died on 24 August 2023, at the age of 93.

== Awards and honours ==
In 1979, Michael Anthony was awarded the Hummingbird Medal (Gold) for his contributions to literature, and he received an honorary doctorate from the University of the West Indies (UWI) in 2003.

== Bibliography ==
- The Games Were Coming (1963)
- The Year in San Fernando (1965; revised edition 1970)
- Green Days by the River (1967)
- Tales for Young and Old (1967)
- Sandra Street and Other Stories (1973)
- Cricket in the Road (1973)
- King of the Masquerade (1974)
- Glimpses of Trinidad and Tobago (1974)
- Profile Trinidad (1974)
- Streets of Conflict (1976)
- Folk Tales and Fantasies (1976)
- The Making of Port of Spain (1978)
- All That Glitters (1981) (cited by the author as his favourite)
- Bright Road to El Dorado (1983)
- A Better and Brighter Day (1988)
- The Golden Quest: The Four Voyages of Christopher Columbus (1992)
- The Chieftain's Carnival and Other Stories (1993)
- In the Heat of the Day (1996)
- Historical Dictionary of Trinidad and Tobago (1997)
- High Tide of Intrigue (2001)
- Towns and Villages of Trinidad and Tobago (2001)
- The Sound of Marching Feet (2020)
