= B. Anthony Bogues =

Caribbean political theorist

- Born: Barrymore Anthony Bogues
- Education: University of the West Indies, Mona, Jamaica
- Occupations: Political theorist, historiam, writer and curator
- Organization(s): Brown University; University of Johannesburg

B. Anthony Bogues is a Caribbean political theorist, intellectual historian, writer and curator and Director of the Ruth J. Simmons Center for the Study of Slavery & Justice at Brown University and the Asa Messer Professor of Humanities and Africana Studies . He was an Honorary Research Professor at the University of Cape Town and is currently a distinguished visiting professor and curator at the Visual Identities in Art and Design Research Center, University of Johannesburg. He is also a Visiting professor of African and African Diaspora Thought at Vrije Universiteit Amsterdam. In 2024, Bogues received an honorary degree (D. Litt) from SOAS, University of London.

In 2012, Bogues was also the Distinguished Faculty Fellow, Marta Sutton Weeks Distinguished Visitor at Stanford University. He has written extensively on African and African Diaspora political theory and intellectual history, including works on C. L. R. James, Sylvia Wynter and George Lamming. Bogues curates and writes about Haitian art, and he was the curator of The Art of Haiti: Loas, History and Memory, an exhibition at Colorado Springs Museum (February 10, 2018 – May 20, 2018).

== Education ==
Bogues has a PhD Political Theory, from the University of the West Indies, Mona, Jamaica (1994).

== Books ==
- Caliban's Freedom: Early Political Thought of CLR James (Pluto Press, 1997)
- Black Heretics, Black Prophets: Radical Political Intellectuals (Routledge, 2003)
- After Man: The Critical Thought of Sylvia Wynter (Ian Randle Publishers, 2006)
- Empire of Liberty: Freedom Power and Desire (Dartmouth College Press, 2010)
- The Aesthetics of Decolonization: The George Lamming Reader (Ian Randle Press, 2011)
- From Revolution in the Tropics to Imagined Landscape: The Art of Edouard Duval Carrie (Perez Art Museum, 2014)
- Metamorphosis: The Art of Edouard Duval Carrie (Miami Contemporary Art Museum, 2018)
- The Art of Haiti: Loas, History and Memory (Colorado Springs Fine Arts Center, 2019)
- The Imagined New, Vol 1. Working Through Alternative Archives, Art, History and the African Diaspora (ed.) (Iwalewa Books, 2023 )
- In Slavery's Wake: Making Black Freedom in the World (ed.) (Smithsonian Books, 2024 )
