= Hilda McDonald =

Antiguan poet and politician (1883–1961)

- Born: Hilda Ellen Maud Edwards; 3 August 1883; Antigua
- Died: 6 April 1961 (aged 77)
- Occupations: Poet and politician
- Notable work: Snowflakes and Stardust (1956)
- Spouse: William MacLachlan McDonald (m. 1902)
- Children: Arthur McDonald; John Archie McDonald
- Relatives: Ian McDonald (grandson)

Hilda Ellen Maud McDonald (3 August 1883 – 4 June 1961) was an Antiguan poet and politician. She was the first female member of the Antiguan House of Assembly.

== Biography ==
She was born Hilda Ellen Maud Edwards on 3 August 1883 in Antigua. In 1902, she married Dr. William MacLachlan McDonald, MRCS LRCP OBE, a physician with the Royal Army Medical Corps, in South Africa. Their sons were Air Marshal Sir Arthur William Baynes McDonald, KCB, AFC, FRAeS, DL and John Archibald McDonald.

In addition to serving in the Antiguan legislature, she was Chief Information Officer of the colonial Antiguan government.

She published a book of poetry, Snowflakes and Stardust (1956), including the pastoral poem "Evensong", which has appeared in several anthologies. She told her grandson Ian McDonald that "Poetry takes infinite time, and I never made enough time for it. We all have enough time, but very few make enough time for important things."

== Bibliography ==
- Snowflakes and Stardust (1956)
