= The Hummingbird Tree =

1992 film

The Hummingbird Tree is a film directed by Noella Smith and starring Patrick Bergin, Niall Buggy, Desha Penco and Sunil Ramjitsingh. It was filmed in Trinidad and Tobago in 1992 by the BBC. The script of the movie, by Jonathan Falla, was based on the book The Humming-Bird Tree, written by Ian McDonald and first published by Heinemann in 1969. The book was republished by Macmillan Publishers in 2004.
