= Hugh Stollmeyer =

Trinidad and Tobago painter (1912–1982)

- Stollmeyer with wall painting
- Born: 13 January 1912; Trinidad and Tobago
- Died: 12 June 1982 (aged 70); New York, United States
- Education: Art Students League of New York, U.S.A
- Known for: Painting, poetry

Hugh Stollmeyer (13 January 1912 – 12 June 1982) was an artist from Trinidad and Tobago.

== Early life and the Trinidad Independents ==
Hugh Stollmeyer was born in Trinidad and Tobago, the southernmost country in the Caribbean, on 13 January 1912. The influence of his idyllic early years in this lush tropical paradise is apparent in his art, both in his use of vibrant colors and in his portrayal of island people. He attended Queen's Royal College, in Port of Spain, Trinidad. He was an artistic child; always painting, reading, drawing and writing poetry and plays. After he finished school he joined the "Trinidad Independent", a group of creative thinkers who questioned the social and artistic "norm" of the day and whose interests included: the abolishment of class divisions, capitalism, racism, religious extremism and prejudice against homosexuality. A consciousness of Trinidad's cultural heritage was visible for the first time in the artwork of Stollmeyer and the Trinidad Independents; the influences of Amerindian iconography and the symbols of African Obeah are two such examples. Stollmeyer exhibited his work with others from the Independents in Trinidad and abroad; among them was Amy Leong Pang, with whom he developed an especially close working relationship.

== The Beacon ==
Collectively, the Independents published a magazine called The Beacon as a means to manifest their collective desire to make the nation of Trinidad a vital intellectual center where new ideas could be tested and new avenues of racial and political justice could be discussed in the Caribbean. The magazine included articles on politics, sociology and philosophy, as well as reviews of book and art exhibitions, original poetry and short stories. Stollmeyer wrote articles on art, art restoration and reviews of art exhibitions, as well as poetry.

== Artistic maturity ==
Stollmeyer left Trinidad and Tobago for New York City, United States, in the summer of 1930 and lived with his older brothers who were already working and studying there. Stollmeyer apprenticed at a photographic advertising company, and attended classes at the Art Students League. He continued his correspondence with the Trinidad Independents and wrote for The Beacon. In 1933 he moved back to Trinidad. Stollmeyer continued exhibiting his work locally and abroad and was active in the Trinidad art scene. By 1938, he was increasingly uncomfortable within the confines of Trinidad society, and he returned to New York City. The work from the late 1930s, particularly after his return to New York, marks the beginning of Stollmeyer's artistic maturity. His work captures the character and mixed ethnicity of the Trinidad people as well as the vibrant color and the lush and varied forms of tropical foliage.

He was very active in the Greenwich Village creative community and spent much time frequenting the galleries, critiquing and learning from others art. While his subject matter and palette continued to reflect both Trinidad's culture, people and tropical foliage as well as the influence of artists such as Botticelli, Gauguin, Matisse, Van Gogh, and Picasso, his style increasingly reflected his knowledge and understanding of avant garde painting in New York City at that time.

== Later years ==
In the mid-1950s, Stollmeyer and his friend Arthur Repkin moved to the countryside north of New York City. Stollmeyer planted extensive gardens here and both the flowers and vegetables he grew became the subjects for his painting. He was also vitally interested in abstract painting, but not the action‚ painting of the abstract expressionists for which he had little sympathy. Much of his abstract work is on an intimate scale in gouache and reflects his continuing interest in surrealism as well as in clear and vibrant color, and in the juxtaposition of mass rather than line.

By 1959, Stollmeyer's relationship with Repkin ended and he returned to New York City and then to Trinidad, where he lived for most of each year until 1964. He participated in the artistic life of the island and exhibited. During this period, he returned to painting Trinidadian women depicted with tropical flowers and foliage. These works utilize designs and colors focused on tropical subjects.

Stollmeyer's productivity and involvement in the art scene was counterbalanced by bouts of depression which he had suffered throughout his life. At this time the depression was accompanied by increasingly heavy drinking and this began to take its toll. After he returned to New York City in 1964, he found it increasingly difficult to paint and stopped painting seriously in 1965.

In 1966, he was asked to design the curtain for the stage at the Trinidad and Tobago Pavilion at Expo 67 in Montreal, Canada. He was both gratified and perplexed to be asked. He was an enthusiastic supporter of Trinidad independence (in 1962), but was also quite aware of his status as an "old colonial". This may have been his last work.

In 1967, he went to work at the Elmhurst Mount Sinai Hospital, New York, in the physiotherapy department. He viewed his work there as a kind of performance, healing through love and laughter as well as physiotherapy. He found the constant contact with people invigorating after the solitary pursuit of painting.

In 1971, he left the hospital, hoping to return to painting but found that he could not. His previous work, however, was taken up by the Ligoa Duncan Gallery in Uptown Manhattan and he had exhibitions there and at their gallery in Paris.

In 1976, Stollmeyer returned to Trinidad and Tobago at his family's insistence and was treated for alcoholism. In 1977, he returned to New York, where he died on 12 June 1982, aged 70.

Stollmeyer was one of Trinidad and Tobago's great painters. His work was very influential towards the Caribbean art movement. Many of his paintings have been published by Fine Island Arts Inc., a publishing, marketing and distribution company established by a relative in 2006.
