= My Bones and My Flute =

1955 Edgar Mittelholzer novel

- First edition cover
- Author: Edgar Mittelholzer
- Cover artist: Sanford
- Language: English
- Subject: racism, slavery, misogyny
- Genre: Novel, ghost story, social realism
- Set in: British Guiana, 1933
- Publisher: Secker & Warburg
- Publication date: 1955
- Publication place: United Kingdom
- Media type: Print: hardback
- Pages: 173
- ISBN: 978-0-582-78552-6
- Dewey Decimal: 823.914
- LC Class: PR9320.9 .M5 M9
- Preceded by: The Adding Machine: A Fable for Capitalists and Commercialists
- Followed by: Of Trees and the Sea

My Bones and My Flute: A Ghost Story in the Old-Fashioned Manner is a 1955 novel by Guyanese author Edgar Mittelholzer.

== Plot ==
British Guiana, 1933. A jumbee (ghost) of a Dutch slaveowner, who died by suicide after his family was killed in the 1763 slave revolt, haunts whoever comes in contact with his will until his bones and flute are buried according to Christian rites. The document's owner, lumber magnate Ralph Nevinson, journeys deep into the jungles of Guiana with painter Milton Woodsley in order to find the Dutchman's bones and flute and end the curse.

== Reception ==
In Stabroek News, Al Creighton wrote: "[My Bones and My Flute] fictionalises both colonial New Amsterdam and the upper reaches of the Berbice River in such memorable fashion that the book stands as a record of the place. It recalls the mythical spiritual preoccupations with the Dutch, the forest and riverain environments that they haunt and the supernatural mysteries that still dwell in a society with a deep respect for obeah." It is generally his most highly-regarded work and is seen as an important piece of Caribbean literature.

A radio adaptation was produced by Radio Demerara, read by James Sydney, and was very popular in Guyana.

In 2022, My Bones and My Flute was included on the Big Jubilee Read, a list of 70 books by Commonwealth authors produced to celebrate Queen Elizabeth II's Platinum Jubilee.
