= Arthur McDonald =

Royal Air Force Air Marshal and Olympic sailor (1903–1996)

Sir Arthur McDonald
- Born: 14 June 1903; South Africa or Antigua
- Died: 26 July 1996 (aged 93)
- Education: Epsom College; Peterhouse, Cambridge
- Parent(s): William MacLachlan McDonald and Hilda McDonald
- Relatives: Ian McDonald (nephew)
- Military career
- Allegiance: United Kingdom
- Branch: Royal Air Force
- Service years: 1924–1962
- Rank: Air Marshal
- Commands: Technical Training Command (1958–59); Royal Pakistan Air Force (1955–57); Aeroplane and Armament Experimental Establishment (1950–52); RAF Staff College, Andover (1947–49); No. 106 Group (1945–47); No. 32 Squadron (1937–38); No. 79 Squadron (1937)
- Conflicts: Second World War
- Awards: Knight Commander of the Order of the Bath; Air Force Cross; Mentioned in Despatches (4)

Air Marshal Sir Arthur William Baynes McDonald, KCB, AFC, FRAeS, DL (14 June 1903 – 26 July 1996) was a senior Royal Air Force officer. He served as Commander-in-Chief of the Royal Pakistan Air Force from 1955 to 1957.

== Early life ==
Arthur McDonald was born on 14 June 1903 in either South Africa or Antigua. His father, William MacLachlan McDonald, was a British Army doctor who had served in the Second Boer Warl; his mother Hilda McDonald (née Edwards) was a poet and the first female member of the Antiguan House of Assembly. He grew up on the Caribbean islands of Saint Kitts and Antigua, then members of the British West Indies. He was educated at Antigua Grammar School, before joining Epsom College, a public school in Surrey, England. He studied arts at Peterhouse, Cambridge, graduating with a Bachelor of Arts (BA) degree: as per tradition, his BA was promoted to a Master of Arts (MA Cantab) degree.

== Military career ==
On 15 March 1924, McDonald was commissioned into the General Duties Branch of the Royal Air Force (RAF) as a pilot officer on probation. His commission and rank were confirmed on 15 September 1924. He was promoted to flying officer on 15 October 1925. On 1 September 1928, he was granted a permanent commission. He was promoted to flight lieutenant on 13 October 1929.

McDonald was appointed Officer Commanding No. 79 Squadron and then Officer Commanding No. 32 Squadron in 1937. He served in the Second World War as assistant director of Repair and Servicing at the Air Ministry and then on the staff at Headquarters Fighter Command, before becoming Air Defence Commander in Ceylon in 1942, Air Officer Training at Headquarters Air Command of South East Asia Command in 1943 and Air Officer Commanding No. 106 Group in April 1945.

After the war, McDonald was appointed Commandant of the RAF Staff College, Andover and then Commandant of the Aeroplane and Armament Experimental Establishment before becoming Director-General of Manning in the rank of air vice marshal at the Air Ministry in 1952.

In June 1955, McDonald became the fourth and last Commander-in-Chief of the Royal Pakistan Air Force. At the time of his retirement the Royal Pakistan Air Force became the Pakistan Air Force, and McDonald was succeeded in the command of the renamed force by Air Marshal Asghar Khan.

McDonald's last appointments were as Air Officer Commanding-in-Chief at Technical Training Command in 1958 and as Air Member for Personnel in 1959 before retiring in 1962.

== Sailing ==
A keen sailor, McDonald competed in the 1948 Summer Olympics. He represented Great Britain in the Firefly event. He came ninth out of 21 competitors. He later became Admiral of the RAF Sailing Association.

== Later life ==
Following retirement, McDonald continued sailing, and was an active member of the Royal Lymington Yacht Club. He won his last race at the age of 92. He died on 26 July 1996, aged 93.

Military offices
Preceded by Leslie William Cannon	Commander-in-Chief, Royal Pakistan Air Force; 1955–1957	Succeeded by Asghar Khan
Preceded by Sir George Beamish	Commander-in-Chief Technical Training Command; 1958–1959	Succeeded by Sir Wallace Kyle
Preceded by Sir Hubert Patch	Air Member for Personnel; 1959–1961	Succeeded by Sir Walter Cheshire
