= Robert Edison Sandiford =

- Born: 1968 (age 56–57); Montreal, Quebec, Canada
- Occupation: writer

Robert Edison Sandiford (born 1968) is a Canadian novelist, short story writer and essayist. Born in Montreal, Quebec, he co-founded with the poet Linda M. Deane ArtsEtc, a periodical devoted to culture in Barbados. In 2003, his short story "Reckoning" was awarded the Barbados Governor General's Award for Literary Excellence.

== Bibliography ==
=== Fiction ===
- 12 X 93 — 1993 (with Sonja Skarstedt & Brian Busby)
- Winter, Spring, Summer, Fall: Stories — 1995
- The Tree of Youth and Other Stories — 2005
- Intimacy 101: Rooms & Suites — 2013
- And Sometimes They Fly: A Novel — 2013
- Fairfield: The Last Sad Stories of G. Brandon Sisnett — 2015

=== Graphic novels ===
- Attractive Forces — 1997 (with Justin Norman)
- Stray Moonbeams — 2002 (with Justin Norman & Brandon Graham)
- Great Moves — 2010 (with Geof Isherwood)

=== Non-fiction ===
- Sand for Snow: A Caribbean-Canadian Chronicle — 2003
