= Sandra Pouchet Paquet =

Trinidad-born scholar and academic

- Born: Sandra Pouchet; Trinidad, Trinidad and Tobago
- Occupation: Academic
- Known for: Founder of Anthurium: A Caribbean Studies Journal
- Notable work: The Novels of George Lamming
- Awards: Bocas Henry Swanzy Award (2023)

Sandra Pouchet Paquet is a Trinidad-born scholar and academic. A pioneer in US-based Caribbean studies, she became a professor of English at the University of Miami in 1992. She has been particularly noted for her work on writer George Lamming. In 2023, she was honoured with the Bocas Henry Swanzy Award for Distinguished Service to Caribbean Letters.

== Biography ==
Sandra Pouchet was born in Trinidad, and undertook studies for her undergraduate and postgraduate degrees in the United States. From 1974 to 1977, she taught at the University of the West Indies, Mona, and she then held Assistant Professorships at the University of Hartford (1977–1985) and the University of Pennsylvania (1985–1992), before joining the University of Miami.

In 1982, she published the first book-length study of the fiction of George Lamming, The Novels of George Lamming, regarded as "a seminal work", and she is also the author Caribbean Autobiography: Cultural Identity and Self-Representation (2002). She was the founder in 2003 of Anthurium: A Caribbean Studies Journal and served as its editor until 2009. She has also been guest editor of the journals Callaloo and West Indian Literature.

== Awards ==
She was the recipient of the 2023 Bocas Henry Swanzy Award for Distinguished Service to Caribbean Letters, "in recognition of her pioneering contributions to academia, literature and cultural studies", presented to her in April 2023 at the first fully in-person festival since 2019.

== Bibliography ==
- The Novels of George Lamming (Heinemann Educational Books, 1983)
- Caribbean Autobiography: Cultural Identity and Self-Representation (Wisconsin: University of Wisconsin Press, 2002)
