= BIM (magazine) =

Caribbean literary magazine, published 1942–1996

- Editor: Esther Phillips
- Categories: Caribbean literature
- Founder: Frank Collymore
- Founded: 1942; 84 years ago
- First issue: 1942
- Country: Barbados
- Language: English
- Website: www.bimmag.org

Bim, stylized as BIM, is a distinguished "little magazine" first published in Barbados in 1942. It was one of two pioneering Caribbean literary journals to have been established in the 1940s, the other being A. J. Seymour's Kyk-Over-Al in British Guiana in 1945. According to the Barbados National Register, on the submission of 16 volumes of BIM magazine together with the associated Frank Collymore Collection of correspondence in 2008:

The importance of the magazine is that it provides a miniature history of primary sources in West Indian literature. In the mid twentieth century the magazine fostered the idea, new in the region at that time, that the profession of writing is an honorable one. The magazine was the chief meeting place for Anglophone literary ideas thus enabling the writers to overcome their isolation. Bim provided also an opportunity for new writers to appear in print alongside more established Caribbean writers who had published abroad. The magazine was thus a major force for regional dialogue, championing regionalism by its actions. Almost every important West Indian writer contributed first poems and short stories to Bim. It was here that they obtained their first encouragement and it was from here that links were established with the BBC programme Caribbean Voices and its producer Henry Swanzy who championed the development of Caribbean writing abroad.

The founding editor of Bim was Frank Collymore. Subsequent editors have included A. N. Forde, Edward Kamau Brathwaite, John Wickham and E. L. Cozier. The current editor is Esther Phillips.

== History ==
Begun as an offshoot of the journal of the Young Men's Progressive Club, Bim magazine first appeared in December 1942, after which it continued regular publication (originally four times a year) until 1996. Many of the Caribbean writers who later received international recognition in the 1950s and '60s published work in Bim in its early years. Notable contributors included Michael Anthony, Ian McDonald, Sam Selvon, and George Lamming, and Monica Skeete. Lamming wrote (in an introduction to the issue of June 1955): "There are not many West Indian writers today who did not use Bim as a kind of platform, the surest, if not the only avenue, by which they might reach a literate and sensitive reading public, and almost all of the West Indians who are now writers in a more professional sense and whose work has compelled the attention of readers and writers in other countries, were introduced, so to speak, by Bim."

After a decade of silence, Bim was relaunched in 2007, now subtitled "Arts for the 21st Century", and published twice a year (in May and November) by the Errol Barrow Centre for Creative Imagination, the University of the West Indies (UWI), Cave Hill, Bridgetown, Barbados, in collaboration with the Office of the Prime Minister, Government of Barbados.

The magazine frequently produces special themed issues, for instance, one on Haiti in 2010. In November 2016, at UWI, Cave Hill, a special Independence edition of the magazine was launched, featuring writers including Esther Phillips, George Lamming, Kamau Brathwaite, Austin Clarke, Anthony Kellman, Linda Deane, Sir Henry Fraser, Sir Hilary Beckles, Mark McWatt and Adrian Green.

== See also ==
- Savacou
- Kyk-Over-Al
- The Beacon
