= Anthurium (journal) =

- Discipline: Caribbean studies
- Language: English
- Edited by: Patricia Saunders, Donette Francis

Publication details
- History: 2003–present
- Publisher: University of Miami
- Open access: Yes
- License: CC BY

Standard abbreviations
- ISO 4: Anthurium

Indexing
- ISSN: 1547-7150

Links
- Journal homepage; Online archive

Anthurium: A Caribbean Studies Journal, established in 2003, is a peer-reviewed open access web-only, academic journal that publishes original works by Caribbean writers and scholars, including on visual art, current issues in Caribbean studies, and travelogues. The journal is "committed to bridging the digital divide by making peer reviewed, scholarly articles and creative writing available to teachers, students, scholars and persons interested in Caribbean literature and culture worldwide without fee based subscriptions."

The journal is published by the University of Miami, and the editors-in-chief are Patricia Saunders and Donette Francis (University of Miami). Publication by the University of Miami has been highlighted as one of the "external" (outside the Caribbean) efforts to support the region through digital resources. The journal has been singled out as a "noted publication directly related to the English-speaking Caribbean" in connection with projects to develop regional online resources (Caribbean Libraries in the 21st Century, 2007).

== History ==
As stated on the journal's website: "Through the innovative vision of Sandra Pouchet Paquet of the English Department and the Digital Media Lab of Otto G. Richter Library, Anthurium began with a special issue in honor of Kamau Brathwaite and has continued to grow as a journal that features art, scholarly essays, poetry, short fiction and reviews."

== See also ==
- Caribbean studies topics
- Digital Library of the Caribbean
