= The Emigrants (Lamming novel) =

1954 novel by George Lamming

- Title page for The Emigrants (1954)
- Author: George Lamming
- Language: English
- Subject: Coming-of-age novel
- Publisher: Michael Joseph
- Publication date: 1954
- Publication place: United Kingdom
- Media type: Print
- Preceded by: In the Castle of My Skin
- Followed by: Of Age and Innocence

The Emigrants is a 1954 novel by Barbadian writer George Lamming, a sequel to his debut autobiographical book In the Castle of My Skin, following the life of the same protagonist as he travels from Barbados to England in search of better prospects and opportunities. Lamming "experimented with the form of the novel as he sought to portray an original historical experience: the immigration of Caribbean peoples to Britain."

The Emigrants was first published in London by Michael Joseph and in the United States by McGraw Hill. It was reissued in 1980 by Allison and Busby, and was subsequently published by the University of Michigan Press, described as "an elaborately conceived novel, dense with dynamic characters and evocative details" that "focuses initially on the emigrant journey, then on the settling-in process. The journey by sea and subsequent attempts at resettlement provide the fictional framework for Lamming's exploration of the alienation and displacement caused by colonialism."

== Reception ==
According to Kirkus Reviews in 1955: "There is much that is individual here -- the evoking of mood, the power in presenting characters separately in a group; there is also much evidence of Joycean and Existentialist fraternity which may eventually merge into the author's thought and style less obtrusively. Perhaps the ambiguity which filters through the book is necessary to the sense of groping, almost a wooziness, which encircles the reader. A book of serious intent."
