= Jacqueline de Weever =

Literary scholar and poet (1932-)

Jacqueline de Weever (born 1932) is a Guyanese-born literary scholar and poet. She is Professor Emerita at Brooklyn College, City University of New York.

== Life ==
Jacqueline de Weever was born in Georgetown, British Guiana. She is the niece of the poet A. J. Seymour. De Weever was educated in Georgetown and in New York. She gained her PhD at the University of Pennsylvania in 1971, with a thesis entitled 'A Biographical Dictionary of Proper Names in Chaucer'. She went on to teach medieval English literature for 25 years at Brooklyn College. She lives in Brooklyn.

Sheba's Daughters (1998) combined "the concepts of medieval rhetorical treatises with the perspectives of post-colonial criticism", to examine how Saracen women were portrayed in medieval French epic poetry of the 12th and 13th centuries.

De Weever has also written poetry, which has appeared in Blue Unicorn, The Homestead Review, Iodine, Tiger's Eye, and Vanitas. A 2019 poetry collection, Trailing the Sun's Sweat, was written in response to Cecil Jane's translation of The Journal of Christopher Columbus.

== Works ==
- The Bamboo Flute and Other Stories. 1979.
- A Dictionary of Classical, Mythological and Sideral Names in the Works of Geoffrey Chaucer. University of Pennsylvania, 1983.
- Mythmaking and Metaphor in Black Women's Fiction. 1992.
- Chaucer Name Dictionary: A Guide to Astrological, Biblical, Historical, Literary, and Mythological Names in the Works of Geoffrey Chaucer. New York: Garland, 1996.
- Sheba's Daughters: Whitening & Demonizing the Saracen Woman in Medieval French Epic. New York: Garland, 1998. ISBN 0-81533018-9
- Aesop and the Imprint of Medieval Thought: A Study of Six Fables as Translated at the End of the Middle Ages. 2010.
- Rice-Wine Ghosts. The Poet's Press, 2017.
- Trailing the Sun's Sweat. The Poet's Press, 2019. ISBN 0-922558-77-9
