= Linda M. Deane =

Barbadian journalist and writer

Linda M. Deane is an English-born writer and editor living in Barbados.

== Biography ==
The daughter of Barbadian parents, she received most of her secondary school education in England and earned a BA degree in Comparative American Studies from the University of Warwick. She has worked as a journalist in Barbados, the United Kingdom and the United States. She works as a tutor at the primary school level for creative writing. She was a founding member of Writers Ink Barbados.

Deane was co-editor with Robert Edison Sandiford of the 2007 anthology Shouts from the Outfield: The ArtsEtc Cricket Anthology, as well as other later collections. She is also a poet and essayist, and her work has appeared in various publications, including Poui, The Caribbean Writer and Bim: Arts for the 21st Century, and in the anthology The Understanding Between Foxes and Light. She also writes for children.

In 2006, she received first prize in the Frank Collymore Literary Endowment, also receiving the Prime Minister's Award, for her collection of poetry Cutting Road Blues: A Narrative.
