= John Figueroa =

Jamaican poet and educator (1920–1999)

- Born: John Joseph Maria Figueroa; 4 August 1920; Kingston, Colony of Jamaica, British Empire
- Died: 5 March 1999 (aged 78); Milton Keynes, England
- Education: College of the Holy Cross (BA); University of London (MA)
- Occupations: Poet, teacher, academic, broadcaster
- Spouse: Dorothy Grace Murray Alexander
- Children: 7
- Writing career
- Notable work: The Chase. A Collection of Poems 1941–1989
- Notable awards: Guggenheim Fellowship, Silver Musgrave Medal

John Joseph Maria Figueroa (4 August 1920 – 5 March 1999) was a Jamaican poet and educator. He played a significant role in the development of Anglophone Caribbean literature both as a poet and an anthologist. He contributed to the development of the University College of the West Indies as an early member of staff, and had a parallel career as a broadcaster, working for various media organizations including the BBC. He also taught in Jamaica, Britain, the United States, Nigeria and Puerto Rico.

== Biography ==
Figueroa was born in Jamaica, the eldest of the 13 children (10 of whom survived infancy) of Blanche Maria Palomino and Rupert Aston Figueroa. He was educated at St George's College, and won a scholarship to attend the College of the Holy Cross in Massachusetts, graduating in 1942. He then taught at St George's College and at Wolmer's School in Jamaica. Blue Mountain Peak, his first collection of poetry, appeared in 1944. In 1946 he went on a British Council fellowship to the University of London to study for a teaching diploma and a master's degree in education. He subsequently taught in London schools, and spent six years as an English and philosophy lecturer at the Institute of Education. He also contributed criticism, stories and poetry to the BBC's Caribbean Voices radio programme produced by Henry Swanzy.

In Jamaica Figueroa became the first West Indian to be appointed to a chair at the University College of the West Indies, and the first Dean of the Faculty of Education. Between 1964 and 1966 he was a visiting professor first at Rhode Island University and then Indiana University. In the early 1970s he became Professor of Humanities leading the Department of Education of the Centro Caribeno de Estudios Postgraduados, Puerto Rico. From 1976 to 1980 he was Professor of Education at the University of Jos in Nigeria.

In the 1980s he moved to the UK, where he worked for the Open University, was a Fellow at the Centre for Caribbean Studies, University of Warwick, and an adviser in multicultural education in Manchester. He edited the pioneering two-volume anthology Caribbean Voices (vol. 1: Dreams and Visions and vol. 2: The Blue Horizons, 1966 and 1970 respectively), comprehensive landmark collections of West Indian poetry. He was also the first general editor of the Heinemann Caribbean Writers Series.

He also played an important role in the development of Caribbean studies as a founder member of the Caribbean Studies Association and the Society for Caribbean Studies.

His own poetry "reflects his origins as a Jamaican of [Hispanic] descent and a Catholic who, whilst deeply committed to the Caribbean, was concerned to maintain [the diversity of its] heritage without apology. He insisted that drums were not the only Caribbean musical instrument (no doubt a dig at Kamau Brathwaite) and championed Derek Walcott's relationship to the classical and European literary tradition. Ironically, one of Figueroa's most effective poems is in Nation language." In the words of Andrew Salkey, "The phrase 'cosmopolitan poet' does not really adequately describe him or the impact that he has had on Anglophone Caribbean poetry, but it certainly goes some way in defining a part of his concern in not being tagged as regional or provincial. This is so because he is absolutely free from national limitations." The influence of classical poets like Horace, Virgil and Sappho is balanced by his linguistic attention to Jamaican speech and Trinidadian calypso music.

== Archives ==
Figueroa's papers were donated by his daughter to the University of the West Indies at Mona and are housed in two collections: one at the UWI Archive, the other at the West Indies Collection at the Library.

== Works ==
- Blue Mountain Peak: Poetry & Prose (privately published, Jamaica, 1944).
- Love Leaps Here (privately published, UK, 1962).
- Ignoring Hurts (Three Continents Press, Washington, 1976)
- The Chase: A Collection of Poems 1941–1989 (Peepal Tree Press, 1991)
- As editor: Caribbean Voices, vol. 1: Dreams and Visions (1966) and vol. 2, The Blue Horizons.

== See also ==
- Caribbean poetry
- Caribbean literature
