= Farnham Hospital =

- Frimley Health NHS Foundation Trust
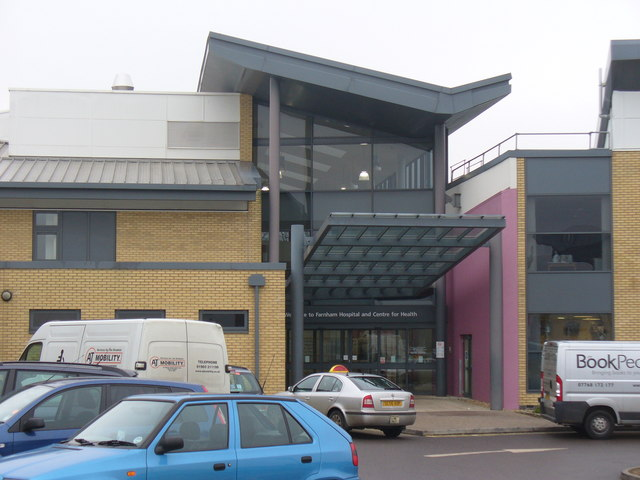
- Main entrance to the hospital

- Location within Surrey

Geography
- Location: Farnham, England, United Kingdom
- Coordinates: 51.220549°N 0.784633°W

Organisation
- Care system: Public NHS
- Type: Community

History
- Founded: 1791

Links
- Website: Farnham Hospital and Health Center
- Lists: Hospitals in England

Farnham Hospital is a community hospital in Farnham, Surrey, England. It is managed by the Frimley Health NHS Foundation Trust.

== History ==
The site of the hospital was originally built as a workhouse in 1791 and was mentioned in Sir Frederick Eden's 1797 survey of the poor in England. It was adopted by the local Poor Law Union in 1846.

The hospital is notable for being visited by Florence Nightingale, who is alleged to have visited the hospital while living at Waverley Abbey House, before travelling to Scutari, Ottoman Empire in 1854. She presented the hospital with a travelling Holy Communion set, which is stored as an exhibit in the hospital along with a further gift of a crucifix.

Two additional infirmary blocks were built in 1870 and 1900 respectively. It was renamed to Farnham County Hospital in 1929, then to Farnham Hospital on establishment of the NHS in 1948. It continued to be the main hospital for the area, until the establishment of the larger Frimley Park Hospital in 1974, which took over A&E services that Farnham had provided.

The Friends of Farnham Hospital, a registered charity supporting the hospital by donations, was founded in 1954.

In 1998, the hospital was identified as requiring improvements to provide better healthcare for patients. Construction of a new building started in 2001 and was opened in 2004 by the Countess of Wessex. The new building replaced some of the original 18th-century structures.

== Services ==
The hospital hosts various medical practices and acts as a centre for blood tests, serving outpatients from Frimley Park as well.
