= Berbice High School =

Location
- New Amsterdam; Guyana
- Coordinates: 6.2545224°N 57.5150156°W

Information
- Motto: Carpe Diem ('Seize the day.')
- Opened: 1916-09-05
- Status: Open
- Gender: co-ed
- Color: Navy Blue
- Nickname: B.H.S.

Berbice High School is a school in New Amsterdam, Guyana.

Berbice High School is a school in New Amsterdam, Guyana. The Boys' School was established on 5 September 1916, on the ground floor of the residence occupied by Rev. J. A. Scrimgeour, BA. Mr. C. A. Pugsley was the school's first Headmaster. Nine pupils were enrolled on the founding day. The Daily Argosy of 8 September 1916, reported that "The courageous venture upon which the British Guiana Mission of the Presbyterian Church of Canada has embarked in New Amsterdam will be watched with greatest interest and sympathy by all whom have paid any attention to the educational problems of this colony. The High School which has been opened, although interested primarily for East Indians, makes no stipulation as to race or creed. Its purpose is to provide in the county of Berbice a public Secondary School. "Over the next two years the number of students grew until there was need for a separate building. With the generosity of the public and the Government, the first section of this building was opened in February 1918. Work continued on this project and, in 1920, the building known as the "Boys Building" was completed. Encouraged by their success the Canadian Mission Council of the Presbyterian Church of Canada established a School for Girls. It was housed in the lower flat of the Missionary's Residence under the charge of Mrs. McLeod, wife of the Minister. When the Church acquired the "Brick Building" Miss McKay was appointed as the first Principal and the school, as well as the Girls' Dormitory, were moved into this building. The two schools continued their separate existence until 1924 when a move for closer co-operation was made with pupils of the Fourth and Fifth Forms working together to prepare for the Cambridge Junior and Senior Certificate Examinations. By 1931, the Berbice High School for Girls was moved from the Brick Building on the corner of Ferry Street and Princess Elizabeth Road to the building formerly occupied by the Missionary. The Brick Building was then sold.
