= Sonja Skarstedt =

Canadian writer (1960–2009)

- Born: October 2, 1960; Montreal, Quebec, Canada
- Died: July 31, 2009 (aged 48); Montreal
- Education: McGill University
- Occupations: poet, writer, artist

Sonja Skarstedt (October 2, 1960 – July 31, 2009) was a Canadian poet, short story, playwright writer, painter and illustrator. Born in Montreal, Quebec, she was the founder and former editor of the literary magazine Zymergy, 1987-1991, and founder of Empyreal Press, 1990. She graduated from McGill University with a BA in English Literature in 1982. She was married to the artist and comic book illustrator Geof Isherwood.

In 2008, Skarstedt began the first of over thirty short film productions on YouTube's Skarwood Channel.

Skarstedt died July 31, 2009 at the age of 48.

== Bibliography ==
=== Poetry ===
- Mythographies — 1990
- A Demolition Symphony — 1995
- Beautiful Chaos — 2000
- In the House of the Sun — 2005

=== Drama ===
- Saint Francis of Esplanade — 2001

=== Fiction ===
- 12 X 93 — 1993 (with Brian Busby & Robert Edison Sandiford)

=== Anthologies edited ===
- Eternal Conversations: Remembering Louis Dudek — 2003 (with Aileen Collins & Michael Gnarowski)
