= Carrington, Barbados =

Village in Saint Philip, Barbados

Coordinates: 13.1976°N 59.5796°W

Carrington is a village in the Parish of Saint Philip in Barbados.

== Notable residents ==
- George Lamming
