= Syn Studio =

Private art school in Montreal, Canada

Coordinates: 45.5050°N 73.5677°W

Cestar Collège - Syn Studio
- Formation: 2007
- Founder: Anthony Walsh
- Type: Private
- Location: Montreal, Quebec, Canada
- Website: synstudio.ca

Cestar Collège - Syn Studio is a private art school located in Montreal, Quebec, Canada that specializes in concept art, illustration and animation for the entertainment industry. Founded in the year 2007, the school has been helping aspiring artists from around the world achieve artistic mastery through its industry relevant concept art, illustration and animation courses as well as its Full Time Programs. The school recently moved to a brand new location in the Hochelaga-Maisonneuve neighbourhood of Montreal. Our new address is 3440 Ontario St E, Montreal, Quebec H1W 1P9.

Syn Studio was ranked the number 1 school worldwide for Concept Art and Illustration by The Rookies in 2020.

Syn Studio is a part of the Cestar College Group, a well established educational institution in Ontario and Quebec.

== Programs ==
Cestar Collège - Syn Studio offers a variety of educational options to suit people of all levels. These are:

- 18-month Concept Art AEC (NTL.1A) Program that is taught onsite.
- 12 month Online Concept Art Program to help students build a top notch concept art portfolio.
- 10 Week Online Art Classes taught by experienced artists currently working in the entertainment industry.
- Class Bundles option to combine 3, 4 or 5 classes.
- Animation Bundles option to combine and specialise in Animation related classes.
- Webinars and Masterclasses.

== History ==
Cestar Collège - Syn Studio was established in the year 2007 by Antony Walsh as Galerie Synesthesie, a traditional drawing and painting atelier in a beautiful loft in downtown Montreal. In the year 2011, the school changed its name to Syn Studio, and started offering regular onsite art classes to artists.

In June 2014, the school ran a Concept Art & Design Masterclass with renowned American concept artist Scott Robertson. In May 2015, the school hosted a Comics Salon event in celebration of Free Comic Book Day. Every summer, from 2016 to 2019, the school hosted a 4-day masterclass event titled “Syn Studio Gathering of Masters'' that featured drawing workshops and panel discussions involving master concept artists and illustrators such as James Gurney, Samantha Youssef and Raphael Lacoste, among others.

In Fall 2016, the school launched its 18-month Concept Art AEC (NTL.1A) Program that is recognized by the Ministère de l'Enseignement supérieur, Quebec. Due to the world-wide corona pandemic, the school moved its offerings from onsite to online in May 2020 and launched its brand new Online Art Classes.

In the year 2021, Syn Studio was acquired by Cestar College, a well established educational institution from Ontario and integrated into the Cestar Quebec group of institutions in the year 2022. The school formally changed its name to Cestar Collège - Syn Studio in the year 2023.

== Notable faculty ==
Cestar Collège - Syn Studio's roster of highly qualified instructors includes top video game and film artists, legendary comic book artists and award-winning fine artists and illustrators, currently working in the industry. These instructors are not only recognized masters in their fields but also accomplished and sought after instructors.

Some notable faculty members include:

- Christian de Massy - Concept Artist and Illustrator best known for his work on movies like X-Men: Apocalypse, X-Men: Days of Future Past, Mirror Mirror, Night at the Museum and The Curious Case of Benjamin Button, among others
- Kelly Tindall - Shuster Award-nominated artist and illustrator best known for Simon & Schuster's popular Show Me History series of biographical history comics. In addition his work has also been featured on webcomics such as The Adventurers, That's So Kraven!, Rebel Blood, Bedlam, Daken: Dark Wolverine and the Shuster Award-nominated Strangebeard
- Pierre Raveneau - Senior Concept Artist whose work has been featured in games such as Assassin's Creed Valhalla, Gods of Rome, Asphalt Xtreme and Tom Clancy's ShadowBreak
- André Pijet– Polish cartoonist known for his hockey themed cartoons from the 90s
- Nicolas Vallet - Lead Concept Artist best known for his work on blockbuster films like X-Men: Days of Future Past, Immortals, Ben-Hur, The Great Wall, The Wandering Earth and more
- Sunshine Kim - Character Designer whose work has been featured on Starcraft Remastered, Warcraft 3 Reforged, Halo: Fall of Reach, as well as the Rainbow Six Siege franchise.
- Mike Wiesmeier - Former Disney animator whose artwork has been featured in acclaimed animated movies such as Pocahontas, The Hunchback of Notre Dame, Hercules, Fantasia 2000, Tarzan, and Beauty and the Beast.
- Donna Shvil - Figurative artist known for her realistic-style painting. Her work has been featured in art magazines in both Canada and the United States
- Jianli Wu - Concept artist and illustrator who has worked on popular titles such as NBA Elite 11, World Cup 10, FIFA 10, Fight Night Round 4 and Gotham Knights
- Eric Mannella - Award-winning fine artist and the co-founder of Atelier de Brésoles.

== See also ==
- Higher education in Quebec
- Video gaming in Canada
