= A. J. Seymour =

Guyanese writer, editor and publisher (1914–1989)

Arthur James Seymour (12 January 1914 – 25 December 1989), or A. J. Seymour, was a Guyanese poet, essayist, memoirist, and founding editor of the literary journal Kyk-Over-Al.

== Biography ==
Born in Georgetown, British Guiana, to James Tudor Seymour, a land surveyor, and his wife Philippine, née Dey, A. J. Seymour attended the Collegiate School and the Guyanese Academy before entering Queen's College, British Guiana's most prestigious boys' school, on a Government Junior Scholarship in 1928.

He married Elma Editha Bryce, a teacher, on 31 July 1937. They had three daughters and three sons.

=== Bureaucrat and public man ===
In 1933, he joined the British Guiana Civil Service as an unpaid volunteer, working in the Postal and Income Tax Departments before joining the Bureau of Publicity and Information. By 1954, Seymour had worked his way to the position of Head of Government Information Services. This was a troubling time for Guiana; the People's Progressive Party (PPP) government headed by Cheddi Jagan, which was elected in 1953, had been removed from office by the colonial authorities after just four and a half months, sparking a phase of civil and political unrest that was to last for over ten years.

In 1962, Seymour left the civil service and accepted the post of Information and Cultural Collaboration Officer of the Caribbean Organisation, based in Puerto Rico. He returned to Guiana in 1965, a year before Independence, and worked with the Demerara Bauxite Company (Demba), based in Mackenzie (the town was later renamed Linden) until 1971; first as Community Relations Officer, later as Public Relations Officer. In 1972 he served as Literary Co-ordinator for the first Caribbean Festival of Arts (Carifesta), held in Guyana; in 1973 he rejoined the civil service as Deputy Chairman of the Department of Culture and Director of Creative Writing. He retired in 1979.

Over the nearly fifty years of his career, Seymour also held senior positions in a number of cultural institutions; among others, he was Honorary Secretary of the British Guiana Union of Cultural Clubs (1943–1950), Deputy Chairman of the Guyana National Trust (1974–1975), President of the British Guiana Music Festival Committee, and President of the International P.E.N. Club's British Guiana Centre.

=== Editor and publisher ===
In 1945, Seymour founded Kyk-Over-Al (sometimes spelled Kykoveral), a literary journal named for an early Dutch fort on the Essequibo River. Over a 16-year period until 1961 he published 28 issues of this pioneering magazine, including some of the earliest work of notable writers such as Wilson Harris and Martin Carter. During this time he also edited and published An Anthology of Guianese Poetry (1954); The Kyk-Over-Al Anthology of West Indian Poetry (1952; revised ed. 1958); and the Miniature Poets Series (1951–1953) of pamphlets, which included work by Carter, Harris, Ivan Van Sertima, Trinidadian Harold Telemaque, Barbadian Frank Collymore, and Jamaican Philip Sherlock.

Later anthologies include My Lovely Native Land: An Anthology of Guyana (Longman, 1971), co-edited with Elma Seymour, New Writing in the Caribbean (Georgetown: National History and Arts Council, published after the Caribbean Festival of Arts in Guyana in 1972) and A Treasury of Guyanese Poetry (1980). Starting in 1976, Seymour also wrote five volumes of autobiography.

In 1984, with the help of poet and novelist Ian McDonald, Seymour revived Kyk-Over-Al.

=== Poet ===
In 1936, Seymour began writing poems. By 1937 he had completed his first collection, Verse; his second, More Poems, followed in 1940. The title poem of Over Guiana, Clouds (1944) was a landmark in the development of Seymour's poetic style. Suns In My Blood (1945) contained at least three poems that have come to be considered classics: "Sun Is a Shapely Fire", "There Runs a Dream", and "The Legend of Kaieteur" (this last poem was later set to music by the Guyanese composer Philip Pilgrim).

Seymour's later major collections include Leaves from the Tree (1951), Selected Poems (1965), Patterns (1970), My Lovely Native Land (1971) and Selected Poems (1983). A tribute volume called AJS at 70 (1984), edited by Ian McDonald, contained a selection of 15 poems under the title "The Essential Seymour", chosen by Seymour himself.

Seymour died of a stroke on 25 December 1989, a few weeks shy of his 76th birthday.

In 2000, Seymour's Collected Poems, 1937–1989 was published, edited by Ian McDonald and Seymour's niece, Jacqueline de Weever.

=== Biographer ===
In 1984 working with Elma, Seymour produced the first volume of the Dictionary of Guyanese Biography (DGB). The project had been inspired over thirty years previously when Seymour had been visiting John Archibald Venn in the President's Lodge of Queens' College, Cambridge in 1949. Venn had shown him proofs of the Alumni Cantabrigienses which he was working on at the time. This inspired Seymour with Joel Benjamin and Terrence Fletcher to propose the creation of a Guyana National Encyclopedia. However they failed to get backing for the project. Nevertheless Arthur and Elma proceeded to produce the DGB, with a second volume appearing in 1986.

== Legacy ==
Though a handful of Seymour's poems continue to be well known in Guyana, outside his home country his writing has fallen into obscurity, especially by comparison with that of his friend and colleague Martin Carter. However, Seymour continues to be remembered across the Caribbean for his work as editor of Kyk-Over-Al, in which role he acted as a sort of eminence grise of West Indian letters. He tirelessly encouraged fellow writers, published their work where and when he could, wrote about them in his critical essays, and publicised them in lecture tours, which in later years took him across the Caribbean and to the United States, Brazil, and Germany, among other countries.

At the 2014 NGC Bocas Lit Fest tribute was paid to Seymour to mark the centenary of his birth, with readings from his work by Guyanese writers and others. National Library in collaboration with Francis Quamina Farrier and the University of Guyana hosted an exhibition of his works, as well as mounting a plaque at 23 North Road, Bourda, a former residence. He was posthumously inducted into the Hall of Fame for the Literary Arts in the Emily Murray Reading Room at the National Library.

A literary prize was named in his honor, the AJ Seymour Prize for Short Story, in the 2019 Guyana Annual magazine.

== Selected bibliography ==
- Verse (1937), Georgetown: Guyana Chronicle
- More Poems (1940), Georgetown: Guyana Chronicle
- Over Guiana, Clouds (1944), Georgetown: Guyana Standard
- Suns in My Blood (1944), Georgetown: Guyana Standard
- Poetry in These Sunny Lands (1945), Georgetown: Caribia
- Six Songs (1946), Georgetown: Caribia
- The Guiana Book (1948), Georgetown: Argosy
- Leaves from the Trees (1951), Georgetown: Miniature Poets, Series A
- Selected Poems (1965), Georgetown: Author
- Monologue - Poems (1968), Georgetown: Author
- Patterns (1970)
- Images of Majority (1978)
- Selected Poems (1983)
- Collected Poems 1937–1989 (2000; with an Introduction by Ian McDonald, and edited by Ian McDonald and J. de Weever), New York: Blue Parrot Press.
