= Esther Phillips (poet) =

Barbadian poet (born 1950)

- Born: 1950 (age 75–76); Saint George, Barbados
- Education: Barbados Community College; University of Miami
- Occupation: Poet
- Partner: George Lamming
- Writing career
- Notable work: Leaving Atlantis
- Notable awards: Poet laureate of Barbados

Esther Phillips (born 1950) is a Barbadian poet. She became the first poet laureate of Barbados in 2018.

== Biography ==
Phillips was born in 1950 in Saint George, Barbados, growing up in a village called Greens. She began writing at a young age, publishing her first poem in BIM, the country's main literary magazine, around 1959.

She was educated at St Michael's Girls’ School and Barbados Community College at the University of the West Indies at Cave Hill in the early 1970s, part of the first class of students to attend the college. She continued to write poetry in this period, and in 1983 she published her first chapbook, La Monte, through the University of the West Indies.

In the 1990s, Phillips moved to the United States to study at the University of Miami under a James Michener fellowship. She graduated with an MFA in creative writing in 1999, and her thesis poetry collection was awarded the Alfred Boas Poetry Prize of the Academy of American Poets.

Phillips returned to Barbados and received the Frank Collymore Literary Endowment Award to continue her writing in 2001. She published her first full-length poetry collection, When Ground Doves Fly, in 2003. This was followed by the collections The Stone Gatherer (2009) and Leaving Atlantis (2015), the latter of which won the national Governor General's Award for Literary Excellence in 2016. Leaving Atlantis was dedicated to George Lamming, her longtime partner. Her most recent book is Witness in Stone (2021).

Her work is influenced by her childhood in the countryside and her Christian faith, as well as the country's folk culture and history of colonialism.

She has co-edited the long-standing literary magazine BIM since 2007. After founding the Writers Ink Inc. collective, Phillips and fellow members of the collective created the Bim Literary Festival and Book Fair, and a corresponding children's literature festival, in 2012.

In 2018, Phillips was named as the first poet laureate of Barbados, a three-year position chosen by the country's cabinet and bestowed by the Ministry of Culture, Sports and Youth.

Philips produces the radio show What’s That You’re Reading? for the Caribbean Broadcasting Corporation and has also been a Sunday columnist of the Nation newspaper. She is the chair of the Frank Collymore Literary Endowment Committee and taught for many years at Barbados Community College. She now also teaches writing in the country's prison system. In 2023, she was a visiting fellow at SOAS University of London.

She has been a leader in campaigning for reparations in Barbados, including calling for the island's Drax Hall Estate, a privately owned former plantation, to be converted into a public memorial to the enslaved people who died there.

== Selected works ==
- La Montee (chapbook, 1983)
- When Ground Doves Fly (2003)
- The Stone Gatherer (2009)
- Leaving Atlantis (2015)
- Witness in Stone (2021)
