= Carl Moore =

Barbadian jazz critic, journalist, and broadcaster

Carl Moore is a Barbadian jazz critic, journalist, radio broadcaster and former head of the Barbados Broadcasting Association.
