= Caribbean Voices =

BBC World Service radio programme

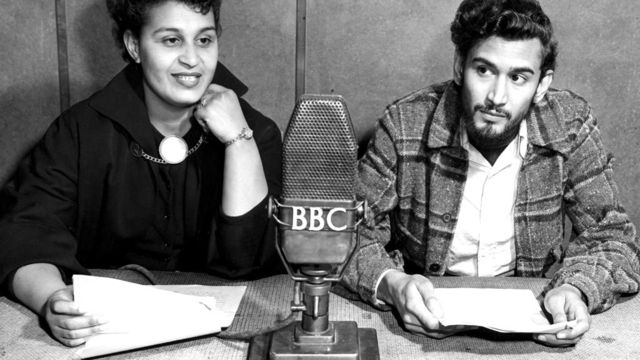
Pauline Henriques and Samuel Selvon reading a story on Caribbean Voices, 1952.

Caribbean Voices is a radio programme broadcast by the BBC World Service from Bush House in London, England, between 1943 and 1958. It is considered "the programme in which West Indian literary talents first found their voice, in the early 1950s." Caribbean Voices nurtured many writers who went on to wider acclaim, including Samuel Selvon, Edward Kamau Brathwaite, V. S. Naipaul, Derek Walcott, John Figueroa, Andrew Salkey, Michael Anthony, Edgar Mittelholzer, Sylvia Wynter, and others.

== History ==
Caribbean Voices evolved out of the BBC's first programme for Caribbean listeners, Calling the West Indies, launched in 1939 to give West Indian soldiers in the British army an opportunity to connect with family at home during the Second World War by reading letters on air to family at home in the Caribbean. Jamaican writer and activist Una Marson was hired in 1941 to work on the original programme, and by the following year she had become the West Indies producer, turning the programme, renamed Caribbean Voices, into a forum where Caribbean writing was broadcast. When Marson returned to Jamaica in 1946, Henry Swanzy took over as producer, making an "indelible mark": "Under his editorship, Caribbean Voices took the form of a creative workshop around the craft of writing, in which writers were offered encouragement and informed criticism. He made it known that he wanted the programme to be filled with 'authenticity' and 'local colour,' reflecting the diversity of the region." Swanzy left in 1955, and on his departure The Times Literary Supplement wrote: "West Indian writers freely acknowledge their debt to the BBC for its encouragement, financial and aesthetic. Without that encouragement the birth of a Caribbean literature would have been slower and even more painful than it has been".

During the life of the series, "some 400 stories and poems, along with plays and literary criticism, were broadcast", from some 372 contributors, of whom 71 were women. Notable contributors included:

- Michael Anthony
- Louise Bennett
- Kamau Brathwaite
- Neville Dawes
- Geoffrey Drayton
- John Figueroa
- A. L. Hendriks
- Evan Jones
- Shake Keane
- George Lamming
- Una Marson
- V.S. Naipaul
- Edgar Mittelholzer
- Eric Roach
- Derek Walcott
- Sylvia Wynter
- Samuel Selvon

== Legacy ==
Kamau Brathwaite has described Caribbean Voices as "the single most important literary catalyst for Caribbean creative and critical writing in English". A key figure in the BBC's Caribbean Service at the time was Andrew Salkey as presenter; his programmes "became a glittering showcase for a generation of writers, including Sam Selvon and George Lamming, who had made London their second home. Established and aspiring authors were chivvied, cajoled, gently chastised, inspired and schooled to produce new work for radio on the Caribbean Voices programme over which Andrew Salkey often presided." Other notable writers nurtured by the programme in the 1950s include V. S. Naipaul, Derek Walcott, John Figueroa, Michael Anthony, Edgar Mittelholzer, Gloria Escoffery, Ian McDonald and E. M. "Shake" Keane. Over two hundred authors eventually appeared on Caribbean Voices. Since on radio the poems could only be appreciated orally, Caribbean Voices helped to influence later Caribbean poetry in having a more spoken form; as Laurence Breiner notes, through the medium of radio "much West Indian poetry was heard rather than seen".

Two volumes of poetry broadcast on the programme were compiled and edited by John Figueroa: Caribbean Voices, vol. 1: Dreams and Visions (1966), and vol. 2, The Blue Horizons (1970).

In 2009, a two-part documentary radio series about Caribbean Voices was produced by Colin Grant on the BBC World Service.
