= George Lamming =

Barbadian novelist, essayist and poet (1927–2022)

George Lamming OCC
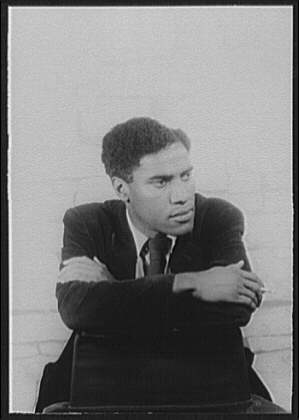
- Photo of Lamming by Carl Van Vechten, 1955
- Born: George William Lamming; 8 June 1927; Carrington Village, Barbados
- Died: 4 June 2022 (aged 94); Bridgetown, Barbados
- Occupations: Novelist; essayist; poet; academic
- Spouse: Nina Ghent (m. 1950, divorced)
- Partner: Esther Phillips
- Writing career
- Notable works: In the Castle of My Skin (1953); The Emigrants (1954); The Pleasures of Exile (1960); Natives of my Person (1972)

George William Lamming OCC (8 June 1927 – 4 June 2022) was a Barbadian novelist, essayist, and poet. He first won critical acclaim for In the Castle of My Skin, his 1953 debut novel. He also held academic posts, including as a distinguished visiting professor at Duke University and a visiting professor in the Africana Studies Department of Brown University, and lectured extensively worldwide.

== Early life and education ==
George William Lamming was born on June 8, 1927, in Carrington Village, Barbados, of mixed Afro-Barbadian and English parentage. After his mother, Loretta Devonish, married his stepfather, Lamming split his time between his birthplace and his stepfather's home in St David's Village. He attended Roebuck Boys' School and Combermere School on a scholarship. Encouraged by his teacher, Frank Collymore – founder of the pioneering Caribbean literary magazine BIM – Lamming found the world of books and started to write.

== Career ==
Lamming left Barbados to work as a teacher from 1946 to 1950 in Port of Spain, Trinidad, at El Colegio de Venezuela, a boarding school for boys. He then emigrated to England where, for a short time, he worked in a factory. As he later wrote:

"Migration was not a word I would have used to describe what I was doing when I moved with other West Indians to England in 1950. We easily thought we were going to an England that had been painted in our childhood consciousness as a heritage and a place of welcome. It is the measure of our innocence that neither the claim of heritage nor the expectation of welcome would have been seriously doubted. England was not for us a country with classes and conflicts of interest like the islands we left. It was the name of a responsibility whose origin may have coincided with the beginning of time. ...
"The emigrants were largely men in search of work. My friend and fellow traveller, the late Samuel Selvon of Trinidad, was a poet and short-story writer then halfway through his first novel, A Brighter Sun. Sam and I had left home for the same reason - to make a career as a writer. This was a journey to an expectation, and between 1948 and 1960 every West Indian novelist of significance within their region made a similar journey: Wilson Harris, Edgar Mittleholzer, Ian Carew of Guyana, Roger Mais, Andrew Salkey and John Hearne of Jamaica.

In 1951, Lamming became a broadcaster for the BBC Colonial Service. His writings were published in the Barbadian magazine Bim, edited by his teacher Frank Collymore, and the BBC's Caribbean Voices radio series broadcast his poems and short prose. Lamming himself read poems on Caribbean Voices, including some by the young Derek Walcott.

Lamming's first novel, In the Castle of My Skin, was published in London in 1953. It won a Somerset Maugham Award and was championed by eminent figures like Jean-Paul Sartre and Richard Wright, the latter writing an introduction to the book's U.S. edition. Lamming later said of the book: "I tried to reconstruct the world of my childhood and early adolescence. It was also the world of a whole Caribbean society." He was awarded a Guggenheim Fellowship, and became a professional writer. He began to travel widely, going to the United States in 1955, the West Indies in 1956 and West Africa in 1958. His second novel, The Emigrants, (1954), which focuses on the migrants' journey and the process of resettlement, was described by Quarterly Black Review as "very thought-provoking. It shows how adrift black people can be as they search for a political, economic and social context. It should also be read as an example of how black people have tried to use the novel to tell their own unique story in a unique way."

He lived in England for more than a decade but, as Hillel Italie notes, "unlike Naipaul, who settled in London and at times wrote disdainfully of his origins, Lamming returned home and became a moral, political and intellectual force for a newly independent country seeking to tell its own story. ...Lamming had a broad, connective vision he would say was inspired in part by the Trinidadian historian-activist C.L.R. James. His calling was to address the crimes of history, unearth and preserve his native culture and forge a 'collective sense' of the future."

He entered academia in 1967 as a writer-in-residence and lecturer in the Creative Arts Centre and Department of Education at the University of the West Indies, Mona, Jamaica (1967–68). Later, he was a visiting professor in the United States at the University of Texas at Austin, the University of Pennsylvania, the University of Connecticut, Brown University, Cornell University, and Duke University and a lecturer in Denmark, Tanzania, and Australia. Lamming also directed the University of Miami's Summer Institute for Caribbean Creative Writing.

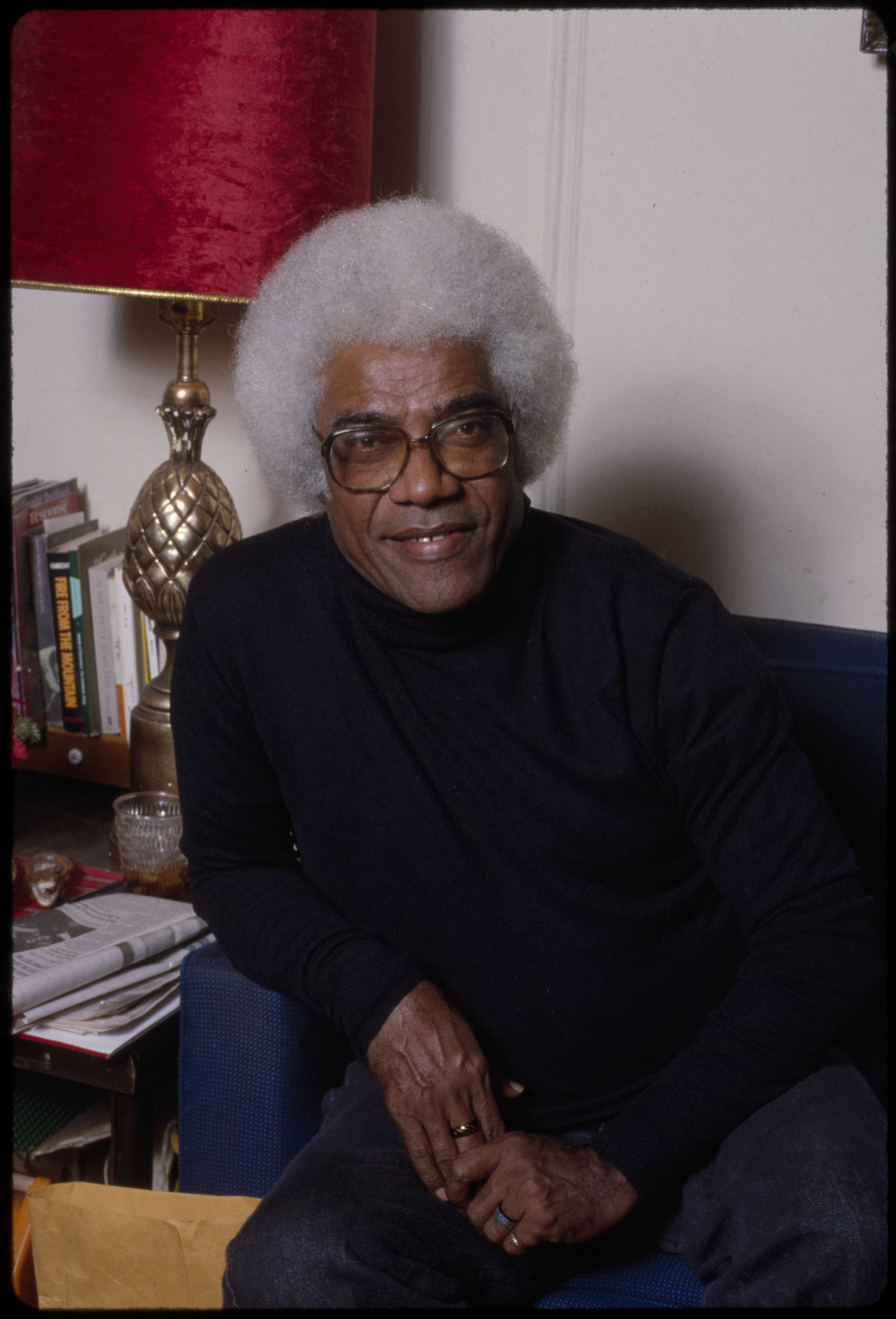
Lamming in 1988

In April 2012, he was chair of the judges for the OCM Bocas Prize for Caribbean Literature, and served as chief judge for the inaugural Walter Rodney Awards for Creative Writing 2014.

George Lamming died in Bridgetown, Barbados, on 4 June 2022, four days short of what would have been his 95th birthday. His son Gordon had predeceased him in 2021; his daughter Natasha Lamming-Lee survives him, as does his long-time partner Esther Phillips.

== Writing ==
Lamming wrote six novels: In the Castle of My Skin (1953), The Emigrants (1954), Of Age and Innocence (1958), Season of Adventure (1960), Water with Berries (1971), and Natives of My Person (1972). His much acclaimed first novel, In the Castle of My Skin, featuring an autobiographical character named G., can be read as both a coming-of-age story as well as the story of the Caribbean. His second novel, The Emigrants, was a sequel to his debut autobiographical work, following the life of the same protagonist as he travels from Barbados to England in search of better prospects and opportunities.

Of Age and Innocence (1958) and Season of Adventure (1960) take place on the fictional Caribbean island of San Cristobal, and 1972's Water with Berries "describes various flaws in West Indian society through the plot of Shakespeare's The Tempest." Of Lamming's last novel, Jan Carew wrote in The New York Times: "'Natives of My Person' is undoubtedly George Lamming's finest novel. It succeeds in illuminating new areas of darkness in the colonial past that the colonizer has so far not dealt with, and in this sense it is a profoundly revolutionary and original work."

Much of Lamming's work had gone out of print by the late 1970s, when Allison and Busby reissued several titles, including his 1960 collection of essays, The Pleasures of Exile, which attempts to define the place of the West Indian in the post-colonial world, re-interpreting Shakespeare's The Tempest and the characters of Prospero and Caliban in terms of personal identity and the history of the Caribbean.

A later (1995) collection of essays is Coming, Coming Home: Conversations II – Western Education and the Caribbean Intellectual.

== Honours and recognition ==
In 2008, Lamming was awarded CARICOM's highest award, the Order of the Caribbean Community (OCC), "honoring fifty-five years of extraordinary engagement with the responsibility of illuminating Caribbean identities, healing the wounds of erasure and fragmentation, envisioning possibilities, transcending inherited limitations. In recognizing this son and ancestor, CARICOM is applauding intellectual energy, constancy of vision, and an unswerving dedication to the ideals of freedom and sovereignty."

Brown University held a two-day series of events celebrating Lamming, 8th–9 March 2011.

In May 2011, the National Union of Writers and Artists of Cuba (UNEAC) awarded Lamming the first Caribbean Hibiscus Award in acknowledgement of his lifetime's work. In 2014, he received a Lifetime Achievement Prize from the Anisfield-Wolf Book Awards.

George Lamming Primary School, located at Flint Hall, St Michael, was named in his honor and opened on the 2nd of September, 2008.

His work is celebrated through the George Lamming Pedagogical Centre, housed at the Errol Barrow Centre for Creative Imagination (EBCCI), with annual distinguished lecture series held annually in June, the month of Lamming's birth. His personal literary collection is housed at the Sidney Martin Library, University of the West Indies, Cave Hill, Barbados.

Lamming's 1953 debut novel, In the Castle of My Skin – about which Mia Mottley, Prime Minister of Barbados, said: "...none of his works touches the Barbadian psyche like his first" – was included on the "Big Jubilee Read" list of 70 books by Commonwealth authors, selected to celebrate the Platinum Jubilee of Elizabeth II in June 2022.

In a statement issued on the day of his death, Prime Minister Mottley described him as a national icon and as "the quintessential Bajan", saying: "Wherever George Lamming went, he epitomized that voice and spirit that screamed Barbados and the Caribbean."

== Published works ==
=== Novels ===
- In the Castle of My Skin (London: Michael Joseph; New York: McGraw-Hill, 1953)
- The Emigrants (London: Michael Joseph; New York: McGraw Hill, 1954. London: Allison & Busby, 1980)
- Of Age and Innocence (London: Michael Joseph, 1958; London: Allison & Busby, 1981)
- Season of Adventure (London: Michael Joseph, 1960; Allison & Busby, 1979; Ann Arbor: University of Michigan Press, 1999)
- Water with Berries (London: Longman, 1971; New York: Holt Rinehart, 1972)
- Natives of my Person (London: Longman; New York: Holt Rinehart, 1972. London: Allison & Busby, 1986)

=== Non-fiction ===
- The Pleasures of Exile (London: Michael Joseph, 1960; Allison & Busby, 1981; Ann Arbor: University of Michigan Press, 1992)
- Coming, Coming Home: Conversations II – Western Education and the Caribbean Intellectual (Philipsburg, St. Martin: House of Nehesi, 1995, ISBN 978-0913441480; in Spanish as Regreso, regreso al hogar: Conversaciones II, 2000)
- Sovereignty of the Imagination: Conversations III – Language and the Politics of Ethnicity (House of Nehesi, 2009, ISBN 978-0913441466)
- Caribbean Reasonings – The George Lamming Reader: The Aesthetics of Decolonisation, edited by Anthony Bogues (Ian Randle Publishers, 2010, ISBN 978-0913441480).

=== Anthologies ===
- Editor, Cannon Shot and Glass Beads: Modern Black Writing (London: Pan, 1974).
- Editor, On the Canvas of the World (Port of Spain: Trinidad & Tobago Institute of the West Indies, 1999.

=== Uncollected short stories ===
- "David's Walk", in Life and Letters (London), November 1948.
- "Of Thorns and Thistles" and "A Wedding in Spring", in West Indian Stories, ed. Andrew Salkey. London: Faber & Faber, 1960.
- "Birds of a Feather", in Stories from the Caribbean, ed. Andrew Salkey. London: Elek, 1965; as Island Voices, New York: Liveright, 1970.
- "Birthday Weather", in Caribbean Literature, ed. G. R. Coulthard. London: University of London Press, 1966.

== Selected awards ==
- 1954: Kenyon Review Fellowship
- 1955: Guggenheim Fellowship
- 1957: Somerset Maugham Award for In the Castle of My Skin
- 1962: Canada Council fellowship
- 1987: Companion of Honour of Barbados (CHB)
- 1998: Langston Hughes Medal
- 2003: Fellow of the Institute of Jamaica (IOJ)
- 2008: Order of the Caribbean Community
- 2009: The Presidents Award (St. Martin Book Fair)
- 2011: Caribbean Hibiscus Prize from UNEAC
- 2012: ALBA Cultural Award
- 2013: Clement Payne Appreciation Award
- 2014: Lifetime Achievement, the Anisfield-Wolf Book Awards
