= Frank Collymore =

Barbadian poet (1893–1980)

Frank Collymore MBE
- Born: Frank Appleton Collymore; 7 January 1893; Saint Michael, Barbados
- Died: 17 July 1980 (aged 87); Saint Michael, Barbados
- Education: Combermere School
- Occupations: Literary editor, author, poet, actor, painter, educator
- Known for: Founder of BIM magazine

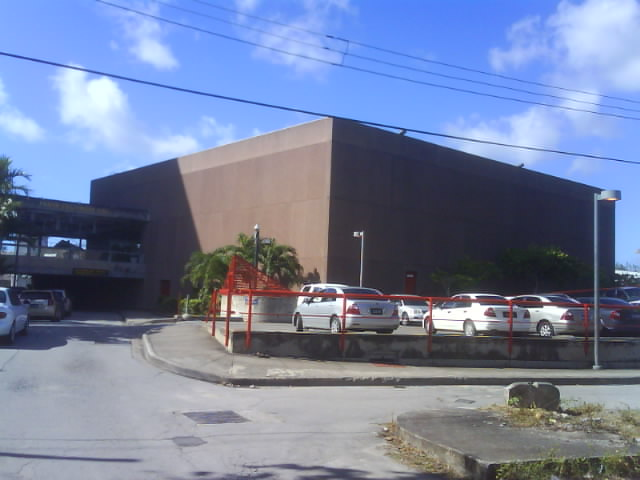
The Frank Collymore Hall at the Central Bank of Barbados, Bridgetown, St. Michael, Barbados.

Frank Appleton Collymore MBE (7 January 1893 – 17 July 1980) was a Barbadian literary editor, writer, poet, stage performer and painter. His nickname was "Barbadian Man of the Arts". He also taught for 50 years at Combermere School, where he sought out and encouraged prospective writers in his classes, notably George Lamming and Austin Clarke. Collymore was the founder and long-time editor of pioneering Caribbean literary magazine BIM.

== Background ==
Frank Collymore was born to Rebecca Wilhelmina Clarke and Joseph Appleton Collymore at Woodville Cottage, Chelsea Road, Saint Michael, Barbados (where he lived all his life). Being a student of Combermere School (from 1903 until 1910), to becoming a member of the staff until his retirement in 1958, up to which point he was its Deputy Headmaster. After this, he often returned to teach until 1963.

On the stage, he became a member of the "Bridgetown Players", which began in 1942. As an artist, he made many drawings and paintings to illustrate his own writings. He called them "Collybeasts" or "Collycreatures".

=== BIM magazine ===
In 1942, Collymore began the famous Caribbean literary magazine BIM (originally published four times a year), for which he is most recognized, while serving as its editor until 1975. John T. Gilmore has written of Collymore: "As a lover of literature, he was also a dedicated and selfless encourager of the work of others, lending books to aspiring writers from their schooldays onwards, publishing their early works in Bim, the literary magazine he edited for more than fifty issues from the 1940s to the 1970s, and helping them to find other markets, especially through the relationship he established with Henry Swanzy, producer of the influential BBC radio programme Caribbean Voices."

== Legacy ==
Three literary awards have been named after him. The Frank Collymore Literary Endowment was established by the Central Bank of Barbados to honour his memory as well as to recognise, support and reward literary talent in Barbados, while the Frank Collymore Hall was constructed as a venue for distinguished public speakers and cultural events.

== Works ==
- BIM (1942–75)
- Thirty Poems (1944)
- Beneath the Casuarinas (1945)
- Flotsam (1948)
- Collected Poems (1959)
- Rhymed Ruminations on the Fauna of Barbados (1968)
- Notes for a Glossary of Words and Phrases of Barbadian Dialect (1970)
- Selected Poems (1971)
- The Man Who Loved Attending Funerals and Other Stories (1993) (published posthumously)
- Day's End (year unknown)

== Awards and honours ==
- Order of the British Empire – 1958
- University of the West Indies M.A. – 1968
- Savacou: A Journal of the Caribbean Artists Movement (January/June), ed. Edward Kamau Brathwaite, dedicated "A Tribute to Frank Collymore" (1973)
- Queen Elizabeth II Silver Jubilee Medal – 1977

== See also ==
- George Lamming, another famous Barbadian author.
- Amaryllis Collymore, his great-great-great grandmother
