= Akyaaba Addai-Sebo =

Ghanaian analyst and activist (born 1950)

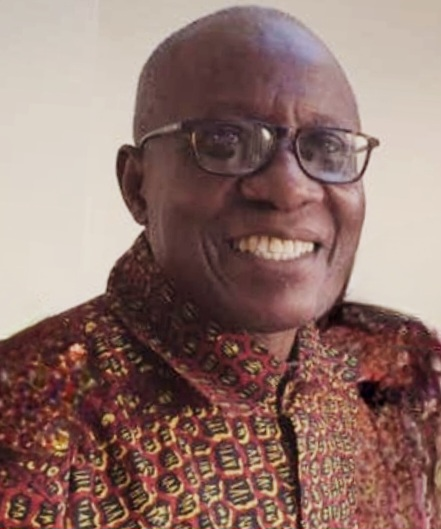
- Born: 5 April 1950 (age 76); Ghana, West Africa
- Occupations: Analyst, journalist and pan-African activist
- Known for: Inauguration of Black History Month in the UK

Akyaaba Addai-Sebo (born 5 April 1950 [some sources give October 1950]) is a Ghanaian analyst, journalist and pan-African activist credited with developing the recognition of October as Black History Month in 1987 in the UK. With Ansel Wong, Addai-Sebo co-edited the 1988 book Our Story: A Handbook of African History and Contemporary Issues. Addai-Sebo's activism spans the African continent, the United Kingdom and the United States, and his influences include C. L. R. James, Chancellor Williams, John Henrik Clarke, and Jewell Mazique.

== Background ==
Born and raised in Ghana, Addai-Sebo was part of Kwame Nkrumah's Young Pioneers Movement. His education took him to the United States in the 1970s, where he was active when "Negro History Week" became "Black History Month", and witnessed how its national annual observance renewed a sense of pride in African-American children. Among those he worked with in the US were C. L. R. James, Chancellor Williams, Yosef Ben-Jochannan, John Henrik Clarke, Kwame Ture, and Jewell Mazique. Addai-Sebo established a radio programme on Pacifica Radio called African Roots American Fruits and ran a schools education programme in the libraries of Washington, DC.

In January 1984, he moved to England, seeking refuge from death squads during the regime of former military leader Jerry John Rawlings. Settling in London with his wife, Nana Akua Owusu, Addai-Sebo was soon interacting with such members of the Black activist community as C. L. R. James and Darcus Howe. Within a year of his arrival in the UK, Addai-Sebo was taking on the roles of special projects coordinator at the Greater London Council (GLC), and chair of the African Refugees Housing Action Group, and from 1989 to 1993 was operations manager of the Notting Hill Carnival.

=== Black History Month UK ===
As Special Projects Coordinator of the Ethnic Minorities Unit at the GLC, Addai-Sebo was instrumental in inaugurating the UK's annual Black History Month, first celebrated in 1987. He "conceived an annual celebration of the contributions of Africa, Africans and people of African descent to world civilization from antiquity to the present and got a lot of support from the leadership of the GLC and ILEA and most especially from Mr. Ansel Wong, Head of the Ethnic Minorities Unit and the leader of GLC, Mr. Ken Livingstone." Discussing his inspiration in 2020, Addai-Sebo wrote:

"I had lectured about African traditions in the United States, and children and their parents told me it had given them a new sense of self. Despite all its grand institutions of higher education, the UK was still a touchstone for colonialism, imperialism and racism. ... I devised a plan with the help of the pioneering team at the GLC's Ethnic Minorities Unit (EMU), ably led by Ansel Wong. We launched the GLC Historical Lectures and Concerts, which took place in February through May 1986 to affirm Africa's contribution to civilization. For a week, we filled the Royal Albert Hall with schoolkids to listen to inspirational music and talks. Speakers toured the communities and generated a buzz.... Rev. Jesse Jackson, Angela Davis, Winnie Mandela, Marcus Garvey Jr. [Marcus Garvey III], Sally Mugabe, Graca Machel, John Henrik Clarke, Yosef Ben-Jochannan, Burning Spear, Ray Charles, Max Roach, Hugh Masekela and many more came to London between 1985 and 1988 at the invitation of the GLC to support the anti-racist and anti-apartheid campaigns."

The lectures were compiled into the book Our Story: A Handbook of African History and Contemporary Issues (London Strategic Policy Unit, 1988), which Addai-Sebo edited with Ansel Wong.

"Our original goal was to first create an enabling cultural space in the UK celebratory calendar and after public acceptance and recognition extend the observance of October as a month to a Black History Season. To make Black History Season a celebration of the magnificence of cultural diversity and the enriching value in peaceful co-existence. To the African mind, to achieve harmony – both the black and white keys of the organ in tune."

On 1 October 1987, the GLC hosted Dr Maulana Karenga from the US to mark the contributions of Black people throughout history, and Addai-Sebo then drew up a plan to recognise the contributions of African, Asian and Caribbean people to the economic, cultural and political life in the UK, with other boroughs beginning to formally institute October as Black History Month in the UK.

Addai-Sebo wrote: "Although I initiated the idea, making Black History Month was a collective effort, and it could not have been achieved without the London Strategic Policy Unit, an organisation established after the Thatcher government abolished the GLC in 1986. There were many people involved, and it is difficult to mention everyone. However, I can mention Ansel Wong, Linda Bellos, Ken Livingstone, Paul Boateng, Margaret Hodge, Anne Matthews, Narendra Makenji, Peter Brayshaw, Drew Stevenson, Bernard Wiltshire, Herman Ouseley, Ken Martindale, Vitus Evans, Chris Boothman, Lord Gifford, Bernie Grant, Shirley Andrews and Edward Oteng among the many. We managed to make this an all party affair.

Addai-Sebo is based in Ghana. Also a journalist, he has written for outlets including Pambazuka News and the Graphic Online.

== Awards and recognition ==
In 2018, Addai-Sebo was named by African Voice newspaper on a list of "61 Influential Ghanaians in the Diaspora".

In December 2022, the University of London's School of Oriental and African Studies (SOAS) conferred Addai-Sebo with an honorary doctorate of literature.
