= Thomas C. Holt =

American historian (born 1942)

- Born: November 30, 1942 (age 83)

Academic work
- Discipline: History
- Institutions: University of Chicago
- Main interests: African diaspora

Thomas Cleveland Holt (born November 30, 1942) is an American historian, who is the James Westfall Thompson Professor of American and African American History at the University of Chicago. He has produced a number of works on the people and descendants of the African Diaspora. He served as president of the American Historical Association in 1994.

He taught at Howard University, Harvard University, the University of California, Berkeley, and the University of Michigan. He was born in Danville, Virginia. He was elected a Member of the American Philosophical Society in 2016.

== Awards ==
In 1978 Holt was awarded the Southern Historical Association's Charles S. Sydnor Prize for his first book, Black Over White.

A past president of the American Historical Association, Holt was a Fellow of the John Simon Guggenheim Memorial Foundation and the Woodrow Wilson International Center for Scholars from 1987 to 1988. Holt became a John D. and Catherine T. MacArthur Foundation Fellow in 1990.

In 1994, President Bill Clinton named Holt to the National Council on Humanities.

He was elected a fellow of the American Academy of Arts and Sciences in 2003.

He was a Citigroup Fellow at the American Academy in Berlin, Germany, for Fall 2008.

== Works ==
- The Problem of Freedom: Race, Labor, and Politics in Jamaica and Britain, 1832–1938 (Johns Hopkins University Press), 1992, winner of the Elsa Goveia Prize awarded by the Association of Caribbean Historians.
- Black Over White: Negro Political Leadership in South Carolina During Reconstruction (University of Illinois Press).
- "Nathan I. Huggins Lectures", The Problem of Race in the 21st Century (Harvard University Press), 2000
- With Frederick Cooper and Rebecca Jarvis Scott, Beyond Slavery: Explorations of Race, Labor, and Citizenship in Postemancipation Societies, UNC Press, 2000, ISBN 978-0-8078-4854-8.
- Children of Fire: a History of African Americans (Hill & Wang), 2010
- The Movement: The African American Struggle for Civil Rights (Oxford University Press), 2021, ISBN 0197525822.
