= Ansel Wong =

Trinidadian-British educator and activist (born 1945)

Ansel Wong CBE
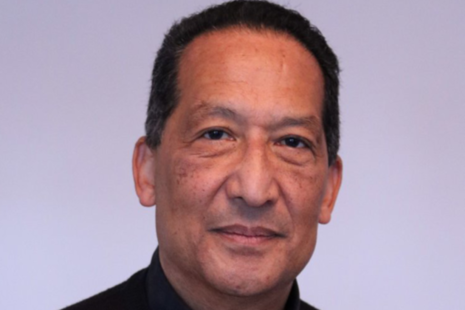
- Ansel Wong
- Born: Ansel Keith David Wong; 4 October 1945 (age 80); San Fernando, Trinidad and Tobago
- Other names: Ade Kimathi
- Occupations: Cultural and political activist
- Known for: Black Londoners (BBC Radio London)

Ansel Keith David Wong CBE (born 4 October 1945) is a Trinidadian-British cultural and political activist, who has been influential in many organisations particularly in the black community in the United Kingdom, where he has been based since the 1960s. He is the former Chair of the Notting Hill Carnival Board and founder of Elimu Mas Band. He is also an educationist and academic, and in a wide-ranging career has worked at senior levels in various organisations in the public and charitable sectors, including with the Windrush Foundation established in 1996 by Arthur Torrington.

== Biography ==
Ansel Wong was born in 1945 in San Fernando, Trinidad and Tobago. His father was a Chinese immigrant while his mother was a multiracial Caribbean of African and Spanish descent. Wong went to San Fernando Boy's Government School (1953–58) and Naparima College (1958–64). He moved to the UK in 1965 to read English and American Studies at Hull University, leaving in 1968. Wong intended to become a Jesuit priest before losing his belief in the order during studies. He went on to do a postgraduate certificate in education, attending the Institute of Education at the University of London, and Brunel University, and later working as a teacher, as well as becoming involved in various black British arts and radical political organisations and campaigns, among which was the Black Liberation Front, founded in 1971, whose newspaper Grassroots he edited under the pseudonym "Ade Kimathi".

In the early 1970s, Wong chaired the West Indian Students Union (based at the West Indian Students' Centre in London's Earls Court), addressing the issues of black people in the UK, and he edited a number of their publications and contributed articles. He also ran an arts organisation, as he described in his own words:

"I used my arts background – in Trinidad I was in a drama group and was a ballet dancer – to set up a group called the Black Arts Workshop to show young British-born black people how theatre can be used to articulate their experiences and to speak meaningfully to the young people coming up who were not exposed to black art and black theatre. My mentors at the time were some of the major Caribbean writers like Andrew Salkey, John La Rose and Eddie Brathwaite, who were members of the Caribbean Artists Movement (CAM). CAM met at the West Indian Students Centre."

From 1974 to 1976, Wong was the founding Education Co-ordinator of the Ahfiwe School, the first black supplementary school that was funded by the Inner London Education Authority.

Under the mayorship of Ken Livingstone, Wong was Principal Race Relations Advisor in the Ethnic Minorities Unit of the Greater London Council (from 1982 until its abolition by Margaret Thatcher in 1986), where he worked closely with Herman Ouseley and Paul Boateng. He was instrumental in supporting the setting up in 1987 of the UK's Black History Month, conceived by Akyaaba Addai-Sebo, with whom Wong co-edited the 1988 book Our Story: A Handbook of African History and Contemporary Issues. In subsequent years Wong was also Education Officer at the London Borough of Ealing (1988–89), and has held such public appointments including being the Chair of North West London Workforce Development Confederation, Chair of London Health Commission and Non-Executive Director of North West London NHS Mental Health Trust. He has been active with the Notting Hill Carnival Trust, Caribbean Development Trust, and has contributed to the Advisory Panel on Cultural Diversity of English National Opera.

He has worked in various capacities for intercultural understanding, especially promoting street art through Mas and Carnival Arts. The author of a number of research papers and other writings, Wong since 2010 has been Managing Editor at multicultural publisher Hansib Publications.

Wong's papers were donated to Black Cultural Archives in December 2008.

In September 2018, to mark Time Out magazine's 50th anniversary Wong was one of 50 people featured as helping to shape London's cultural landscape.

Wong was appointed Commander of the Order of the British Empire (CBE) in the 2020 Birthday Honours for services to arts and culture.

In January 2021, he was announced as the new Chair of Black Cultural Archives.
