= Goveia =

Goveia is a surname. Notable people with the surname include:

- Elsa Goveia (1925–1980), Guyanese social historian and academic
- Ralph Goveia (born 1996), Zambian swimmer
- Ted Goveia (1970–2025), Canadian football coach and executive
