= Racism in English football =

Racism in English football is the abuse of players, officials, and fans because of their skin colour, nationality, or ethnicity. Some may also be targeted because of their association with an opposing team, but there have also been instances of individuals being targeted by their own fans. The topic of racism in association football has been widely covered by the media as well as academic studies. There have been a range of responses by various associations, such as FIFA and UEFA, as well as by teams, and individual players and managers to address the problem.

== Background ==
The Commission for Racial Equality (CRE), the Football Supporters Association (FSA) and the Professional Footballers' Association (PFA) have all launched initiatives in a bid to encourage more people from ethnic minorities to attend matches. In October 2019, Premier League also launched a No Room For Racism initiative, which was visible in all the matches played from 19 to 27 October. Prior to the 2022–23 Premier League, the captains announced to end the practice of taking a knee before matches. However, reaffirming their commitment to stand against racism, they decided to take a knee only on certain selected "significant moments".

== Timeline ==
Arthur Wharton, born in Gold Coast (today's Ghana), was the world's first black professional footballer. He played as a goalkeeper for Darlington. Wharton was considered the first black professional footballer although he was pre-dated by Andrew Watson, a Scottish amateur footballer. Other early non-white footballers include Walter Tull and Hong Y Soo.

Dark-skinned Everton centre-forward Dixie Dean recalled how racist comments were aimed at him as he left the pitch at half time during a match in London in the 1930s. Dean reportedly punched the offender before disappearing into the players' tunnel. The authorities took no action against Dean, and a nearby police officer was alleged to have informed the victim that he had "deserved" his punishment.

Steve Mokone, a black South African who later was signed for, but never played for, Barcelona, left Coventry City in the 1950s after his manager allegedly said to him, "We brought you over here and you are not satisfied. That's the trouble with you people"; Mokone interpreted this as being racist, and he swiftly signed for Dutch side Heracles Almelo.

Roger Verdi, who is of Indian origin, changed his name from Rajinder Singh Virdee due to racism.

English football racism is usually linked with hooliganism.

From the 1950s to the 1970s, English football underwent a split between football clubs and local communities due to immigration from the Caribbean and South Asia and exclusion of the new ethnic communities,

In the 1960s, West Ham United player Clyde Best, who is black and from Bermuda, and Ade Coker a decade later, were both subjected to "monkey chants" and had bananas thrown at them during West Ham's games. Best had blamed this on the influence of the National Front on the football terraces.

At the beginning of the 1980s, by which time the number of black players was growing rapidly, the British government tried to implement measures to address behavior that was not previously considered criminal under national law to eradicate racist behavior, including the introducing a new law, the Public Order Act, which originally aimed to discourage racial hatred. Also, football clubs tried to start 'Football and Community' programs to combat racism and hooliganism.

In the 1980s, racism in football in England was rampant. Paul Canoville was abused by his own fans when he warmed up for Chelsea before making his debut. Garth Crooks was regularly subject to racist chants and banners from opposing fans during his time at Spurs. Cyrille Regis endured monkey chants from Newcastle United fans on his away debut for West Bromwich Albion in the late 1970s and was later sent a bullet in the mail following his call-up to the England squad. In 1988, John Barnes was pictured back-heeling a banana off the pitch during a match for Liverpool against Everton, whose fans chanted "Everton are white" - Barnes was the first black player to play regularly for Liverpool after signing in 1987, while Everton did not have any regular black first team players until the mid 1990s.

In the early 1990s, anti-racist campaigns began to start through partnerships with FIFA and UEFA, who launched 'Let's Kick Racism Out of Football', which targeted fans. This movement emphasized that racism in football stadiums usually comes from the fans, not the club hierarchies.

In 1991, the Football (Offences) Act 1991 was implemented by the British government, which prescribed behaviour such as racist chanting.

On 25 January 1995, Manchester United's Eric Cantona launched a 'kung-fu' style kick into the crowd, directed at Crystal Palace supporter Matthew Simmons. Simmons had run down 11 rows of stairs to confront and shout abuse at Cantona, using the words "Fuck off back to France, you French bastard". Cantona followed the kick with a series of punches. Simmons went on trial where he claimed that he only shouted "Off! Off! Off! It's an early bath for you, Mr Cantona!", but was found guilty of abusive behavior and handed a £500 fine and banned from the stadium for a year, receiving a further sentence of a week in jail plus an additional £500 fine as well as £200 in legal costs for assaulting the prosecutor in court. Although at the time most attention was focused upon Cantona who received an eight-month ban from all football-related activity for the assault, Simmons' behavior that provoked Cantona's kick would be a decade later be regarded as racial abuse which almost certainly would have forced the partial or full closure of Crystal Palace's stadium, as well as meriting Simmons a considerably lengthier sentence.

Aston Villa striker Stan Collymore accused Liverpool defender Steve Harkness of racist abuse during a match at Villa Park in April 1998 - less than a year after his transfer from Liverpool to Villa. In response, Harkness stated: "I vehemently deny the accusation that I made racist comments to Stan Collymore."

On 21 April 2004, Ron Atkinson resigned from ITV after he was caught making a racist remark live on air about the black Chelsea player Marcel Desailly; believing the microphone to be switched off, he said, "...he [Desailly] is what is known in some schools as a fucking lazy thick nigger." Although transmission in the UK had finished, the microphone gaffe meant that his comment was broadcast to various countries in the Middle East. He also left his job as a columnist for The Guardian "by mutual agreement" as a result of the comment.

In 2004, Millwall became the first club to be charged by The Football Association over racist behaviour by their fans. The charges related to abuse aimed at Liverpool player Djimi Traoré. On 13 January 2007, The FA charged Newcastle player Emre Belözoğlu with "using racially-aggravated abusive and/or insulting words", referring to an incident during the 3–0 defeat by Everton at Goodison Park on 30 December 2006. Belözoğlu was, on 16 February 2007, accused of more racist behaviour, this time against Bolton Wanderers' El Hadji Diouf. However, on 1 March 2007, it was revealed that Diouf would not be pursuing his claim. It was also later revealed that Watford player Al Bangura had released a statement declaring that he was the victim of racist abuse from Belözoğlu. On 19 March he was cleared of the charges relating to the Everton game.

In 2004, during a friendly match with Spain, English fans chanted racist comments towards the Spanish team and fans. This incident was widely condemned by the British government. This incident, although not a new manifestation, brought greater awareness in England to the problem of racism in sports.

On 6 March 2007, it was announced that the Metropolitan Police were investigating apparent anti-Semitic chants by West Ham fans before the match with Tottenham Hotspur two days previously after a video of the offence surfaced on the Internet.

On 7 April 2007, in a match between Rotherham United and Gillingham, Gillingham keeper Kelvin Jack was racially abused by a Rotherham fan. On 13 April 2007, the fan was banned for life from the club.

Following his appointment as manager in September 2007, Israeli Avram Grant has been the subject of anti-Semitic taunts from some Chelsea fans; Grant's father was a Polish survivor of the German Nazi Holocaust; Grant has also received death threats and anti-Semitic post.

In November 2008, Middlesbrough's Egyptian forward Mido was subjected to Islamophobic chanting from a small number of Newcastle fans. Mido had been subjected to similar chants the previous year, again from Newcastle fans, and also in 2007 by Southampton fans and West Ham fans who had referred to Mido as a "shoe bomber" in reference to his likeness to Richard Reid, the British terrorist jailed in 2003.

During a League Cup match between Blackpool and Stoke City at the Britannia Stadium on 22 September 2009, Blackpool player Jason Euell, who at the time was sat on the substitutes bench was racially abused by a Stoke fan, who was ejected from the stadium and subsequently arrested by Staffordshire Police before being released pending inquiries. Euell confronted the supporter that was taunting him. Blackpool manager Ian Holloway, who had to restrain Euell, was furious in his post-match interview, saying:

We are human beings and Jason is a footballer. The colour of his skin shouldn't matter. It was disgusting. The stewards believed what Jason said, got the bloke out and I hope he is banned for life. [He is] an absolute disgrace of a human being. I thought those days had gone. Jason was just sat in the dugout at the time. I saw his reaction and I had to calm him down. It's absolutely disgraceful.

Euell, who received an official apology from Stoke City, later said:

It did hurt. I felt I had to stand up for all colours and creeds and show that we won't accept it. I'm proud that I made a stand. It was a shock to hear what came out of the guy's mouth. Racism in football is not dead and buried but it's still a shock to hear that kind of thing in close proximity. There were people near the idiot who didn't agree with it, but there were others who turned a blind eye, which was disappointing.

In the wake of the incident, Spurs manager Harry Redknapp called for fans who racially abuse players to be imprisoned: "That is disgusting – there's no place for that in the game. Surely we can't have that sort of behaviour now? Anyone who does it should be put in prison – not banned from football. Stick them where they belong, in the nut-house. It's wrong."

In April 2011, an initiative was launched by comedian David Baddiel to tackle anti-semitism in the sport, which was backed by players including Frank Lampard, Ledley King and Kieran Gibbs. The same month, two followers of Chesterfield were arrested before the start of a game against Torquay United after racially abusing a young black Torquay player who was taking part in the pre-match entertainment. Offenders Trevor Laughton and Joanne Worrall were subsequently banned from watching football or from approaching the venue of any Chesterfield matches for three years.

On 15 October 2011, Liverpool's Luis Suárez was accused of racially abusing Manchester United's Patrice Evra, and The FA opened up an investigation into the incident. On 16 November, The FA announced they would be charging Suárez, while Liverpool announced support for their player. On 20 December, The FA concluded a seven-day hearing, eventually fining Suárez £40,000 and banning him for eight matches for racially abusing Evra. Suárez had used the word "negrito" towards Evra, meaning "little black man" in Spanish. Suárez claimed that he meant the term to be taken as it is purportedly used in South America, as a term of endearment, but this explanation was not accepted by The FA. The day after Suárez was found guilty, his Liverpool teammates wore t-shirts in support of him. In October 2019 Jamie Carragher apologised for this.

On 23 October 2011, in a match between Queens Park Rangers and Chelsea, QPR's Anton Ferdinand alleged racial abuse by Chelsea captain John Terry, claiming Terry called him a "fucking black cunt" during the game, a claim denied by Terry. On 1 November, the Metropolitan Police announced a formal investigation into the allegations. In January 2012, Ferdinand received death threats and a bullet was sent to him through the post. On 1 February 2012 at Westminster Magistrates Court, Terry was accused of a racially aggravated public order offence in relation to the game at Loftus Road on 23 October. He entered a not-guilty plea and stood trial on 9 July. On 13 July, after a four-day trial, Terry was acquitted. In July, following the court hearing, Terry was charged by The FA with "using abusive and/or insulting words and/or behaviour towards Ferdinand and which included a reference to colour and/or race contrary to FA Rule E3[2]". In September 2012, after a four-day hearing, he was found guilty, banned for four games and fined £220,000. Evidence in his defence at Terry's trial had been given by his teammate Ashley Cole. Ferdinand's brother Rio later referred to Cole via Twitter as a "choc ice", meaning someone who is black on the outside but white on the inside. In August 2012, The FA found this to be a reference to ethnic origin, colour or race and fined Ferdinand £45,000.

On 29 May 2012, the BBC reported that Swindon Town had conceded, in a response to a solicitor's letter from Jonathan Tehoue, that manager Paolo Di Canio, a self-described fascist, had made an inappropriate remark to the player which Tehoue deemed to be racist. Before this news had broken, Swindon's chairman had been quoted as being entirely supportive of Di Canio and had denied that the manager had racially insulted Tehoue. In October 2013, six supporters of Charlton Athletic were sent to prison having been found guilty of racially aggravated fear of violence. The supporters had been on a train returning from a game against Fulham singing songs glorifying Gary Dobson, the racially motivated murderer of Stephen Lawrence.

In March 2014, Wolverhampton Wanderers players Carl Ikeme and George Elokobi stated they were racially abused by opposition fans while playing away at Walsall. No action was taken against the club.

In August 2014, Malky Mackay and Iain Moody were accused of sending each other racist, sexist and homophobic text messages. Moody left his job as sporting director of Crystal Palace as a result. Mackay apologised for the texts. The League Manager's Association defended Mackay, claiming that the texts were merely "banter"; the LMA had to later apologise for this as well. Mackay later denied being racist, sexist or homophobic. In September 2014, Liverpool player Mario Balotelli was subjected to racist abuse on Twitter following his tweet mocking Manchester United. Balotelli had tweeted "Man Utd... LOL'", following their 5–3 defeat to Leicester City. Also in September 2014, Port Vale chairman Norman Smurthwaite considered appointing Jimmy Floyd Hasselbaink as manager, but decided against it partly because he believed that a racist minority of the club's supporters would make appointing a black manager a poor idea. The club changed ownership and appointed their first black manager, Darren Moore, ten years later.

In February 2015, Chelsea fans were involved in an incident in which they pushed a black passenger off a Metro carriage at Richelieu–Drouot station in Paris before a Champions League match against Paris Saint-Germain. The supporters were heard chanting: "We're racist, we're racist, and that's the way we like it." Afterwards, Chelsea released a statement condemning the actions, and vowed to ban those involved. The incident prompted criticism from the football world. The FA condemned the incident, and backed Chelsea to take action. UEFA said they were "appalled" by the incident. FIFA President Sepp Blatter tweeted "there is no place for racism in football". Chelsea later suspended three people from attending Chelsea games pending further investigation.

In December 2017, at Prenton Park in an UEFA Youth League, Liverpool's Rhian Brewster was racially abused during the game.

Fernando Forestieri was accused of racially abusing opposition player Krystian Pearce in a pre-season friendly. He was charged by police, and on 28 December 2018, an arrest warrant was issued after Forestieri failed to attend court. He was found not guilty by a court in March 2019, but was charged with racial abuse by the Football Association. The FA found him guilty and issued a six-game ban, which he said he intended to appeal.

A North West Counties League game between Congleton Town and Padiham in October 2018 was abandoned in the second-half by the referee after the Padiham goalkeeper received racial abuse.

In October 2018 Wilfried Zaha was the victim of racist abuse and death threats following a match. In December 2018, a Tottenham Hotspur supporter was fined £500 and banned for four years for throwing a banana skin at Pierre-Emerick Aubameyang during Arsenal's 4–2 victory in the North London derby in which Aubameyang scored twice.

In January 2019, Crystal Palace goalkeeper, Wayne Hennessey, denied making a Nazi salute after a picture of him was posted on Instagram by teammate Max Meyer. The picture was taken after Palace won their third round FA Cup tie against Grimsby Town. In the picture, Hennessey has one arm raised while the other is over his mouth, much like that of the Nazi salute. However, Hennessey has claimed that he, "waved and shouted at the person taking the picture to get on with it" and "put my hand over my mouth to make the sound carry". Hennessey won't receive any official punishment for the incident as the FA's regulatory commission has stated, "when cross-examined about this Mr Hennessey displayed a very considerable – one might say even lamentable – degree of ignorance about anything to do with Hitler, fascism and the Nazi regime". Although he has come under fire from Kick It Out, which is English football's equality and inclusion organization, and they have stated in a tweet by their official account, "If Wayne Hennessey doesn't know what a Nazi salute is, or understand its horrifying wider implications, then it's vital that he receives appropriate education as a consequence".

In January 2019, women's player Renée Hector said that an opponent had made monkey noises towards her during a match. In February 2019, Sophie Jones was charged by the Football Association with racially abusing Hector. In March 2019, Jones was found guilty and banned for five matches.

In February 2019 West Ham United said they were investigating a video which allegedly showed fans racially abusing Mohamed Salah, including for being Muslim. The club then referred the matter to the police. Later that month Kick It Out chairman Lord Ouseley said the authorities were "dysfunctional" in dealing with racism in football, whilst player Michail Antonio suggested that clubs whose fans engage in racial abuse should be deducted points.

In February 2019 Millwall were charged by the Football Association over alleged racist chanting by their fans during a FA Cup game against Everton in January. Leeds United were also investigated for alleged racism of their fans. The same month, two Burnley fans were accused of using racist slurs against Brighton player Gaetan Bong and homophobic slurs against Brighton fans. Their criminal trial collapsed in October 2019.

In March 2019, Philip Billing suffered racial abuse on social media; the matter was reported to police. In April 2019, a number of players were subjected to racist abuse on social media, including Charlton Athletic players Lyle Taylor, Wigan Athletic player Nathan Byrne, and Watford players Troy Deeney, Adrian Mariappa and Christian Kabasele. Later that month, Chuks Aneke was the subject of a racist meme, and Manchester United captain Ashley Young was also racially abused on social media.

Later that month, an amateur cup final in Leicestershire was abandoned due to racist abuse, with the victim being subjected to a six-match ban, whilst Danny Rose said he was looking forward to ending his football career due to racism. Later that month he said he hoped governing bodies would take more action to eradicate racism in football. That same month Chelsea chairman Bruce Buck said the solution to the issue was education, whilst Raheem Sterling said walking off the pitch in response to racism was not ideal.

In April 2019, Kalidou Koulibaly was the victim of racist abuse from an apparent Arsenal fan during a match between the two teams. The same month, former player Jamie Lawrence spoke out against racism in football, revealing that during his playing career he had been racially abused by one of his own teammates.

In April 2019, The Guardian released a "special investigation into the racism crisis [in English football]" which "uncover[ed] anger, despair and a warning that there will be 'an explosion' unless the problem is tackled".

Later that month, British Asian footballers spoke out about the racist abuse they had encountered, and the following month the vice chair of the Black, Asian and Minority Ethnic Football Forum said that child players as young as seven years old were regularly the subject of racial slurs from not only spectators, but also from opposing players, coaches and managers. In May 2019, Emile Heskey's wife said there were insufficient opportunities for black players to become coaches. Raheem Sterling also Called for tougher punishments.

In June 2019, the English Football League introduced a rule compared to the Rooney Rule.

In July 2019, Kick It Out reported that reports of racist abuse rose by 43% during the 2018–19 football season. Later that month Chelsea issued a lifetime ban against a fan who had racially abused Raheem Sterling in December 2018. On 31 July 2019 the FA increased the minimum ban for racism to six games.

In August 2019, Fulham player Cyrus Christie accused a Fulham fan of assaulting his sister and the fan's wife of using racist language at the club's opening game of the season, a 1–0 loss at Barnsley. Later that month, the FA was told it had to modernise. In the following days, Chelsea Forward Tammy Abraham faced racist abuse over social media, after missing the decisive spot kick against Liverpool in the Uefa Super Cup. The actions were later condemned by Chelsea club spokesperson who said: "We are disgusted with the abhorrent posts we have seen on social media".

On 6 August 2019, Liverpool player Mohamed Salah was subjected to racist comments on social media by an Everton fan, who was arrested by police and later sentenced to six weeks in jail.

In August 2019, Yakou Méïté spoke out about racist abuse he received on social media. He said he chose to do so due to the impact it had on players.

Later that month, Paul Pogba suffered racist abuse on social media after missing a penalty during match on 19 August 2019. The abuse was condemned by players including Ryan Giggs, and Twitter announced they would meet with Pogba's club Manchester United and the Kick it Out organisation, after Phil Neville called for a social media boycott in protest. Pogba's Manchester United teammate Marcus Rashford was also racially abused on social media, and ex-footballer Garth Crooks said that unless something would do there could be an incident between a player and a fan, similar to Eric Cantona's kung-fu kick on an opposition fan in 1995.

In August 2019, Yan Dhanda said that the racism he has encountered as a British Asian footballer inspires him to play his best.

In September 2019, the Black, Asian and Minority Ethnic Football Forum released a report which said that child players were being racially abused.

In September 2019, Jadon Sancho spoke out against racism in football. On 7 September, Raheem Sterling was racially abused by a spectator at England's Euro 2020 qualifier against Bulgaria at Wembley; the spectator was removed from the stadium and later taken to a north London police station on suspicion of public order offence. However, he was released with no further action.

In September 2019, Tammy Abraham said his mother had cried after he had been subjected to racist abuse in a match.

The same month, Stevenage manager Mark Sampson was accused of using racist language by a former coach at the club. The club denied the accusations, while the FA said they would investigate. On 20 November 2019 Sampson was charged by the FA for using racist language.

Later that month the Home Office said that hate crime incidents at football matches increased by 47% during the 2018–19 season from the previous season.

In September 2019, Peter Beardsley was suspended from football for all football-related activity for 32 weeks after being found guilty by the FA of racially abusing players. Later that month, in a match between Hartlepool United and Dover Athletic, both teams' managers said they considered taking their players off the pitch following racist abuse from Hartlepool fans aimed at Dover player Inih Effiong. Dover said they wanted action taken. Hartlepool were charged by the FA in October 2019.

A few days later Bernardo Silva was accused of being racist about Manchester City teammate Benjamin Mendy following a tweet; the FA wrote to Manchester City for its comments. Manchester City's manager Pep Guardiola said punishing Silva for his comments would be a "mistake", and Silva was defended by teammate Raheem Sterling. In October 2019 Silva was charged by the FA. He had 7 days to respond, but was given an extension. In November 2019 he was banned for one match and fined £50,000.

In September 2019, Leeds goalkeeper Kiko Casilla was accused of racially abusing Charlton forward Jonathan Leko in a match between the two teams; the FA said they would investigate. In November 2019 he denied the charge. He was later found guilty, and banned for eight matches and fined £60,000.

In October 2019, three fans of Brighton & Hove Albion were investigated in relation to two separate incidents at their stadium. The same month, a video purportedly showing racist chants from Aston Villa fans about players Marvelous Nakamba and John McGinn surfaced, and was condemned by the club. Later that month Wilfried Zaha was sent racial abuse on social media after missing a penalty in a match.

Later that month the Premier League launched a black and ethnic minority advisory group.

On 19 October 2019, an FA Cup qualifying match between Haringey Borough and Yeovil Town was abandoned after Yeovil fans reportedly racially abused Haringey's goalkeeper Valery Pajetat, including spitting and throwing a bottle at him. Haringey's defender Coby Rowe was also targeted. Both sets of players walked off the pitch. Two men were later arrested. It was later announced that the match would be replayed, with the replayed match ending in a 3–0 victory to Yeovil on 29 October 2019. The next day police announced they were hunting for 3 people in relation to the previous racist abuse.

On the same day as the Haringey-Yeovil incident, Bristol City fans were accused of racist abuse against Luton Town players. There were further racist incidents in the following days, with anti-traveller chants coming from Salford fans at Northampton Town, and a Liverpool player being racially abused at Manchester United. Later that month three Chelsea fans were banned by the club after racially abusing a fellow fan. Liverpool fans were criticised by the club for displaying a racist banner about their own player Divock Origi.

Later that month QPR also criticised FIFA and UEFA for their response to racist abuse of youth players.

In November 2019, there was an alleged racist behaviour of Everton fans during Premier League match between Everton and Tottenham Hotspur was reported. Later that day, Everton said that they were investigating the claims. Police said they would take no action.

In November 2019, Watford captain Troy Deeney said there should be a one-strike policy towards racism. Later that month, Sanjay Bhandari, the new chairman of anti-racism charity Kick It Out, said the problem of racism in football might get worse before it got better.

Later that month, the Home Office announced that there had been a 66% increase in hate crime in English football from the previous year, the majority related to racism. Later that month, Hayes & Yeading said that their player Elliott Buchanan has been subject to racist abuse from a fan whilst playing Salisbury, with Salisbury reporting the matter to police.

On 7 December 2019, Manchester United player Fred was allegedly racially abused by Manchester City fans during the Manchester derby, while Scunthorpe United player Jordan Clarke was also allegedly abused by Forest Green Rovers fans that same day. Ex-player Gary Neville later blamed Prime Minister Boris Johnson for the rise in racism in English football. A man was later arrested for the incident involving Fred. Police investigated an incident of racial abuse by a fan of Millwall towards a Barnsley player following Millwall's 2–1 home defeat on 21 December 2019.

On 22 December 2019, a London derby between Tottenham Hotspur and Chelsea was marred by racist chants and monkey noises aimed at black player Antonio Rudiger, with the match stopped three times. The PFA said an inquiry should be launched, whilst the British government said they would take action. Pundit Gary Neville said players should walk off in response to future occurrences. Tottenham's initial investigation into the racist chanting was said to be "inconclusive", while one Chelsea fan was arrested for a racially aggravated public order offence against Tottenham's Son Heung-min.

In February 2020 BBC Three released a file called Shame in the Game about racism in English football.

On 10 November 2020, FA chairman Greg Clarke resigned after referring to black players as "coloured players" and also said that there were "a lot more South Asians than there are Afro-Caribbeans" in the FA's IT department because "they have different career interests".

In December 2020, following completion of a month-long lockdown in England to help prevent the spread of COVID-19, a limited number of supporters were allowed back into some stadiums for the first time since March 2020. Before a match between Millwall and Derby County at The Den players of both teams took a knee to show support for anti-discrimation as outlined in a statement released by the Milwall players before the match. Some Millwall supporters believing the gesture was in support of the Black Lives Matter movement booed during the gesture. This was construed as a racist act and condemned by Derby manager, Wayne Rooney, government minister, James Cleverly, and TV pundits, Gary Lineker and Micah Richards. Similar disapproval to taking a knee was also heard from some Colchester United supporters before their game against Grimsby Town at the Colchester Community Stadium. Similar jeering by some fans occurred during the taking of the knee on 15 December 2020 before a game between Cambridge United and Colchester United at the Abbey Stadium. The action was condemned by Cambridge manager, Mark Bonner. On 2 January 2021, AFC Bournemouth player, Junior Stanislas was subjected on Twitter to "multiple tweets of racial abuse alongside vile insults about the midfielder's family" after he had scored the only goal for Bournemouth in a 1–0 defeat of Stoke City.

In January 2021, Manchester United players Axel Tuanzebe and Antony Martial were abused online following a defeat in a game. A day later Romaine Sawyers of West Brom received racist abuse following a match, as did Reece James of Chelsea. On 30 January 2021, a 49-year-old man from Kingswinford was arrested for racially abusing Sawyers. The same day, Manchester United forward Marcus Rashford received racist abuse on social media following a draw in a match. The increasing use of social media to racially abuse footballers was noted by Dan Roan of the BBC. In February 2021, Alex Jankewitz of Southampton suffered racist abuse on social media after the midfielder got sent off early in a game. Following a draw in February 2021, Tuanzebe received more racist abuse on social media after conceding a free-kick late in the game, which resulted in a last minute goal for the visitors. By February 2021, several clubs and players had decided against taking a knee before games, with Brentford feeling the gesture no longer had the required impact while Queens Park Rangers felt like it had become diluted. Similar reasons for stopping applied to Middlesbrough, with their player, Britt Assombalonga, calling for change after the initial success of taking a knee. Wilfried Zaha of Crystal Palace described the gesture as "degrading". He announced on 19 February 2021 that he would stop taking a knee before matches. Following Manchester United's draw against West Brom, Martial was again subjected to racist abuse on Instagram.

Analysis by Signify, a data science company who conducted a month-long in December 2020, revealed in February 2021 that there were 16 instances of targeted racist abuse towards Arsenal player Granit Xhaka and found 52 account users involved with online hate against Chelsea player Antonio Rüdiger. A few days later, Arsenal player Eddie Nketiah was sent a racist message underneath a Twitter post, becoming another high-profile footballer to be racially abused on social media.

On 24 February 2021, Walsall and Aston Villa released joint statements condemning racist abuse that Tyreik Wright had received on Instagram. The messages were reported to both the social media platform and West Midlands Police's Hate Crime Unit for investigation. In September of that year, a teenager in the North East of England was charged with sending the abusive messages. On 26 February 2021, Derby County player Colin Kazim-Richards received racist abuse on social media after their 1–1 draw with Nottingham Forest. Derbyshire Police announced an investigation into the abuse. On 6 March 2021, Derby County decided to stop taking the knee before future games as they felt it was a symbolic gesture and therefore not enough.

After Crystal Palace's goalless draw with Manchester United on 3 March 2021, Palace left back Patrick van Aanholt was subjected to racist abuse on social media. On 13 March 2021, Zaha became the first Premier League player to stop taking the knee. On 18 March 2021, Sheffield United player Rhian Brewster shared a racist message that he received from a user on Instagram, with Sheffield United offering Brewster their support and praising him for highlighting racist abuse. Manchester United midfielder Fred was racially abused on an Instagram post from 18 March 2021 after being at fault for Leicester City's first goal in Manchester United's 3–1 FA Cup quarter-final defeat, with the player saying "we are bigger and better than that".

On 4 April 2021, Tottenham Hotspur defender Davinson Sánchez was subjected to racist abuse on Instagram following a 2–2 draw with Newcastle United. It was about the emoji of the monkey towards the player.

On 6 April 2021, following their defeat by Real Madrid in the Champions League, Liverpool players Sadio Mané, Trent Alexander-Arnold and Naby Keïta were also subjected to racist abuse on social media. Liverpool said they would work with the authorities to identify and prosecute offenders but that "it will not be enough until the strongest possible preventative measures are taken".

On 11 April 2021 Tottenham player Son Heung-min suffered racist abuse following a match, with the club saying they would review the matter. On 24 April 2021 all clubs in the Premier League, the EFL and the Women's Super League announced a boycott of all social media platforms for four days starting on 30 April 2021 in an effort to combat racist abuse and discrimination. Following this, Southampton player Nathan Tella opened up on the racist abuse he received after a game with Leeds earlier that season. The same month, Tella was racially abused again after Southampton's defeat to Liverpool.

Following Manchester United's defeat to Villarreal in the Europa League final on 26 May 2021, Marcus Rashford received "at least 70 racial slurs" online, with Manchester United adding that other members of the team were also targeted online after the defeat. The same week, Raheem Sterling and Kyle Walker were racially abused following Manchester City's defeat to Chelsea in the Champions League final.

On 11 July 2021, Marcus Rashford, Jadon Sancho and Bukayo Saka received racist abuse of social media after they all missed during the penalty shootout in the UEFA Euro 2020 final. A mural of Rashford was vandalised, with the player saying he would not apologise for who he is, whilst Sancho later said that racists would never win, and Saka said he "instantly" knew he would receive racist abuse and hate. On 16 July 2021 it was announced that 5 people had been arrested. Instagram also said its moderation technology had failed to deal with racist abuse. The perpetrator was sentenced and suspended for several months because he posted an abusive comment on Facebook.

Tyrone Mings was critical of the Government's response to racist abuse. He accused Home Secretary Priti Patel of encouraging it after she had previously said that fans were right to boo players taking the knee, which she described as "gesture politics". Later Prime Minister Boris Johnson said online racists would be banned from football matches, while Tory MP Steve Baker said the Government should start backing players taking the knee. Also, Portsmouth announced they were investigating reports some of their youth players had engaged in racist abuse of England players. After an investigation, three youth players were subsequently released by Portsmouth.

On 18 September 2021, two Birmingham fans were arrested following an allegation of racist abuse aimed at Peterborough defender Nathan Thompson who made a complaint to referee Jarred Gillett during the match. On the same day, Swansea reported that their defender Rhys Williams was racially abused by a home fan in the second half of their game against Luton at Kenilworth Road. Following Crystal Palace's win against Manchester City on 30 October 2021, Wilfried Zaha posted a series of racist messages that he had received on Instagram following the game.

In December 2021 a Southern Football League game between Tamworth and Biggleswade was abandoned at half-time due to alleged racist abuse. Later that month Arsenal reported a racist incident in a game away at Leeds United, which resulted in an arrest being made, and which the FA investigated. at the end of the month online racist abuse aimed at players was reported by Norwich City.

In January 2022 a man was arrested following alleged racist abuse aimed at pundit and ex-player Ashley Cole.

In February 2022 Chelsea settled a court case with former youth player who alleged racist abuse from coaches. Later that month Bradford City suspended a fan for alleged racist abuse, pending a police investigation.

In April 2022, the Met Police investigated an alleged racist comment made at a local football match. In June 2022 the London FA said that the allegation was not proven.

In May 2022, Crawley Town manager John Yems left the club following allegations that he had racially segregated the training ground changing rooms and had abused black and Asian players. Yems was charged by the FA in July 2022. In January 2023 Yems was banned from football for 18 months after being found by the FA to have used "offensive, racist and Islamophobic" language, but they said it was "not conscious racism". The allegation that it was not "conscious racism" was criticised by Kick it Out and other anti-racism groups. Subsequently, Yems' ban was extended to January 2026 after an FA appeal, the longest ever ban handed out for discrimination.

Also in May 2022, on the same day, two Burnley fans were arrested following racist gestures during a game against Tottenham, while the families of Brentford players Rico Henry and Ivan Toney were racially abused at an Everton game. Anti-racism charity Kick It Out spoke out against the incidents.

In June 2022, England national team manager Gareth Southgate spoke out about the need to educate young football fans about racism. He also added that the sanction is not helpful if is without the education. Southgate added that the problem is not limited to other countries, saying: “In our country we have the same issue. We’re not free of it.”

In July 2022, a Chesterfield fan allegedly racially abused two Bradford City players during a pre-season friendly. The matter was referred to the FA and the police.

In August 2022, a Wolverhampton Wanderers fan was tried at court after allegedly making a monkey gesture at pundit Rio Ferdinand during a game in May.

In September 2022, Stockport County condemned alleged racist chanting from their supporters.

In October 2022, Ivan Toney was racially abused online, as was Rhian Brewster. The abuse aimed at Toney resulted in an arrest after being deemed a hate crime, with the man admitting the offence and apologising. Toney also received online abuse in February 2023.

Later that month, Hawa Cissoko suffered racist abuse after being sent off. She said she was "surprised" by it. Elijah Adebayo also suffered racist abuse in October 2022, the third time in 12 months, and again in October 2023.

That same month, Les Ferdinand criticised the FA's diversity code, saying it had no impact on helping black players become managers.

In November 2022, Rico Lewis was racially abused by Sevilla fans during a match. Manchester City issued a statement saying they “will not tolerate discrimination of any kind at our stadium” and confirmed that two arrests had been made. The club and the police launched a joint investigation into the incident. Sevilla FC also released a statement saying they “strongly condemn the behaviour of two fans” in the away section who were accused of acting in a racist manner toward Lewis. The Spanish club added that if the allegations were proven, the two fans would be removed from the list of members.

Later that month Chuba Akpom was racially abused online, with police involved. The user that abused the player commented "idiot *****", which considered as abhorrent racist remark.

In December 2022, Carlisle United fans were accused of racist chanting in a game against Bradford City. The club was fined £7,500 for the incident.

In January 2023, Blackburn Rovers fans were accused of racism aimed at opposition goalkeeper Neil Etheridge during a match. A 15 year old was later questioned by police in relation to the incident.

In February 2023, there was a report of racial discrimination in the away end during a match between Bradford City and Mansfield Town. Later that month Ivan Toney, and Son Heung-min suffered racist abuse. A Chelsea fan was later banned for the abuse at Son.

In March 2023, Kyle Walker-Peters was racially abused. After a match, Southampton defender Kyle Walker-Peters was subjected to racist abuse, including monkey emojis and comments wishing him injury, on Instagram. Many of the comments remained online for over eight hours. Walker-Peters wrote: “The racial abuse I received is something that no player or person should ever have to experience. We need to be better, and this is bigger than just football.” Teammate Bella-Kotchap also wrote: “Yesterday I was the victim of several racist statements that hit me. We all have to take racism personally, even if we are not directly affected.”

Later that month, the man who had abused Toney was given a 'landmark' stadium ban.

In April 2023, a Brentford fan was arrested after allegedly racially abusing another fan.

In May 2023, Son Heung-min was racially abused by way of a 'racial gesture'. In November the fan was banned from football for 3 years.

Also in May 2023, Millwall head of youth Barry Dunn was accused of racist and Islamophobic tweets. Later that month, after missing the final penalty for Coventry City in a 6–5 defeat in the penalty shootouts against Luton Town in the EFL Championship play-off final, Fankaty Dabo received racist abuse.

In June 2023, Rochdale head groundsman was charged with racially abusing a media member at a game in February. He was suspended in October 2023.

In September 2023, a man was arrested after racist abuse of a Wolves player in a match against Crystal Palace. Later that month, Wes Foderingham received racist abuse following a match. Later that month, Gillingham were fined following racist chants by fans, whilst Everton launched an investigation into alleged racist abuse of an Arsenal player.

In October 2023, Destiny Udogie received racist abuse following a match, as did Ethan Pinnock, and Juninho Bacuna. Later that month, Les Ferdinand said that criticism he had received whilst working at QPR was motivated by racism, whilst Pascal Chimbonda said he wanted to be an inspiration to black managers.

On 28 October 2023, racist gestures were aimed at Omar Bogle by a Gillingham fan after he scored for Newport. On 31 October 2023, racist comments were made in a match between Bradford City and Manchester United U21s.

On 26 December 2023, an alleged racist remark was aimed at Carlton Morris.

In January 2024 a racist remark was aimed at a match official during a Carlisle United match, and a man was arrested. Later that month, Coventry City player Kasey Palmer was subjected to a racist gesture by a Sheffield Wednesday fan. After the incidents, Omar Beckles, chairman of the Professional Footballers' Association, said players were of the view that not enough was being done to deal with racism in the sport. Sheffield Wednesday were later fined £12,500 for this incident, and the perpetrator was banned from football for 5 years.

On 3 February 2024, Juninho Bacuna was allegedly racially abused by a fan. The same day, the game between Bradford City and AFC Wimbledon was temporarily paused following an alleged racist incident involving a home fan aimed at opposition player Omar Bugiel. Later that month, Ivan Toney suffered racist abuse.

Later that month, a fan was banned for, amongst other things, racist abuse aimed at Mohamed Salah. Mason Holgate also suffered racist abuse on social media following a sending off in a match.

In March 2024, Joe Jacobson said he had suffered anti-semitism, whilst Sam Kerr was charged with the racially aggravated harassment of a police officer. Later that month, Stuart Webber was criticised after stating that some black footballers would have ended up in jail if they hadn't played the sport. His former club Norwich City distanced themselves from his comments.

In April 2024, Wycombe player Chris Forino was allegedly racially abused by Blackpool fans. A few days later, Hull manager Liam Rosenior suffered racist abuse online after being nominated for an award. Later that month, Chelsea player Nicholas Jackson was racially abused.

In May 2024, former Premier League referee Rodger Gifford was banned for five months after making a racist comment to a fellow official.

In July 2024, during UEFA Euro 2024, former Kick It Out chief Troy Townsend expressed concerns about racism if black English players missed penalties, as happened in the 2020 tournament. Later that month the organisation reported record instances of discrination during the 2023–24 season.

In August 2024, Colchester player Samson Tovide was racially abused in a match against Accrington.

In October 2024, Bristol Rovers player Shaq Forde was racially abused on social media following a match. Later that month, Crystal Palace player Daichi Kamada was racially abused by supporters after being sent off.

In October 2024, Wolverhamton player Hwang Hee-chan was racially abused by the Como player Marco Curto, who was banned by FIFA for ten matches.

In November 2024, the BBC stated that there was increasing racism against East and South East Asians in football in England.

In December 2024, a Colchester player was allegedly racially abused by Fleetwood fans, and a Watford player was racially abused by Burnley fans. That month Kyle Walker called on Instagram to do more to help tackle racism,

In February 2025, the racist abuse of Joe Willock was reported to police. Later that month, Kick It Out described abuse and racism in English football as a "crisis", and a few days later Abdoulaye Doucoure was racially abused following the Merseyside derby, before Burnley player Hannibal Mejbri accused Preston player Milutin Osmajic of racially abusing him during a match, which Osmajic denied. The FA said they would investigate the incident, and in March 2025 Osmajic was charged by the fA. In November 2025, Osmajic received a 9-match ban.

In March 2025, Fulham player Calvin Bassey suffered racist and homophobic abuse after scoring against Manchester United, whilst Chelsea player Wesley Fofana suffered racist abuse after his team lost against Arsenal.

In July 2025, during Euro 2025, England player Jess Carter suffered racist abuse on social media, and police were involved. Fare later questioned the England team's decision to stop taking the knee. National team manager Sarina Wiegman defended the decision, stating that the gesture was not sufficient. Carter also feared teammate Lauren James would be subject to racism. A man was later arrested for the abuse of Carter.

In August 2025, Mathys Tel was subject to racism on social media following Tottenham's defeat in the 2025 UEFA Super Cup. Later that month, a Luton fan was arrested for racially abusing a Bradford City player during a match between the two clubs. That same month, Antoine Semenyo was also racially abused by a Liverpool fan who was later arrested. Semenyo said he wanted bans and jail for those guilty of racist abuse. He also said that there were other abuses against him online after the incident.

In September 2025, Doncaster Rovers player Jordan Gibson scored against his former club, Bradford City, subsequently receiving racist abuse online from a Bradford City fan. Later that month, Liverpool player Rafaela Borggrafe was accused of racially abusing a teammate.

In December 2025, the BBC released a report covering one November weekend on social media. The report revealed over 2000 abusive posts including racist insults, homophobic slurs, and violent threats including rape, all targeting Premier League and Women's Super League managers and players. Most of the post were on Twitter accounts from Britain and Ireland, aimed mainly at Manchester United's Ruben Amorim, Liverpool's Arne Slot, Newcastle's Eddie Howe, and Chelsea Women's Sonia Bompastor.

In January 2026, a man was banned from football for 3 years for sending racist abuse to Fulham footballer Rodrigo Muniz in 2024 and 2025. Later that month, Bradford City player Curtis Tilt suffered racist abuse in the West Yorkshire derby away at Huddersfield, with a man later being arrested.

In February 2026, Chelsea head coach Liam Rosenior said that anyone found guilty of racist behaviour in football should be banned from the sport. Later that month, players Hannibal Mejbri, Wesley Fofana, Tolu Arokodare and Romaine Mundle all suffered racist abuse in one weekend.

In March 2026, Tottenham Hotspur was fined by UEFA following fans' Nazi salutes. Later that month, in the Tyne–Wear derby, the match was paused after alleged racist abuse at Sunderland player Lutsharel Geertruida. A man was later arrested in relation to the incident.

In June 2026, Belgian player Pierre Dwomoh was banned for 11 matches for racially abusing a Watford U21 teammate.

== Examples ==
Date indicates when the incident occurred, rather than when an outcome was reached.

| Date | Incident | Outcome | Source |
|---|---|---|---|
| 15 October 2011 | Danny Hylton of Aldershot racially abused two Barnet players. | Hylton was given an eight-match ban and fined £1,000. | |
| 12 March 2012 | Sky Sports cameras caught an Arsenal fan abusing Newcastle United's Cheick Tioté. | The man was arrested on suspicion of a racially aggravated public-order offence. | |
| 20 March 2012 | Crawley Town's Dean Howell was allegedly racially abused by a Gillingham supporter. | Unknown. | |
| 15 April 2012 | A 55-year-old man racially abused Didier Drogba during the 2011–12 FA Cup semi-final. | The fan was given a lifetime ban from Stamford Bridge and a three-year football banning order. | |
| 6 October 2012 | Marvin Sordell claimed he was racially abused by a Millwall fan whilst playing for Bolton Wanderers. | The 13-year-old was given a ban for "the foreseeable future". | |
| 31 October 2012 | A Chelsea fan was caught making a "monkey" gesture to Manchester United's Danny Welbeck. | The 28-year-old is banned from Stamford Bridge pending a police investigation. | |
| 10 November 2012 | Six Millwall fans arrested after unfurling a racist banner aimed at Marvin Sordell. | | |
| 6 October 2018 | A game between Congleton Town and Padiham was called off after fans subjected Padiham players to racial abuse. | Congleton were fined £160 for their supporters' abuse, while Padiham were fined £165 for leaving the field. | |
