= Edward C. Mazique =

American physician

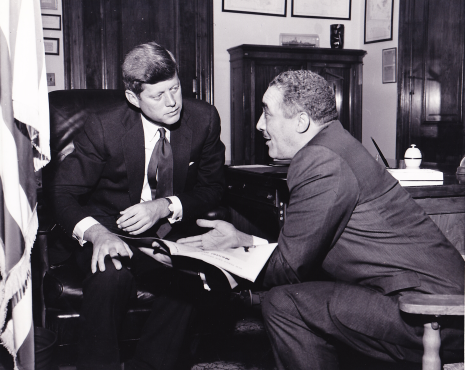
Edward C Mazique with JFK- Medicare discussion

Edward Craig Mazique (1911–1987) was a pioneer in the medical community especially among African Americans. Edward Craig Mazique was a native of Natchez, Miss. He graduated from Natchez College before leaving Mississippi to pursue an undergraduate degree and graduated from Morehouse College in Georgia, later serving on its board of trustees. He received a master's degree in education from Atlanta University, then was a teacher and administrator at the old State A&I College in Forsyth, Ga., before moving here. He received his medical degree from Howard University in 1941 and served an internship and a residency in internal medicine at the old Freedmen's Hospital.

== Career ==
Mazique was president of the District Medico-Chirurgical Society, a Black medical organization, in 1952, when he became one of the first five Blacks admitted to the District Medical Society. In 1954, he was one of the first two Blacks chosen in more than 60 years to be accepted on the medical staff of Georgetown University Hospital. He also became an attending physician at Providence Hospital. In 1956, he chaired a special committee of the Washington NAACP branch dealing with the desegregation of the District school system. He also had served as an officer of campaign committees for Del. Walter E. Fauntroy (D-D.C.).

In the early 1950s, Mazique served on the old D.C. Commissioners' Citizens Advisory Council. Over the years, he also chaired the interracial practices committee of the 12th Street Branch of the YMCA and, in the early 1950s, led the fight to integrate all area YMCA facilities. In 1960, he was named Omega Man of the Year by the Omega Psi Phi fraternity. He also served on the local board of the NAACP and the executive public health committee of the national organization. In 1958, he was elected president of the National Medical Association. In 1968, he was chairman of the Health Services Coordination Committee for the Poor People's Campaign March on Washington.

== Family and divorce ==
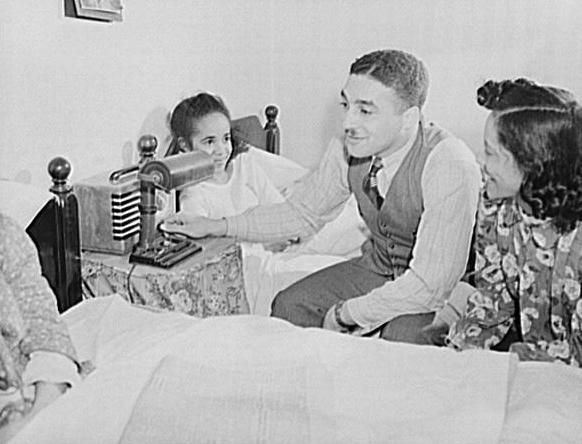
Edward and Jewel Mazique and "one of their nieces whom they are rearing"

Mazique was married to Jewell Mazique in 1937, separated in 1961, and divorced in 1965. They had two sons, Edward and Jeffrey. His wife preferred to be involved with social causes more than have a social life. Despite this view, Mazique's social life was frequently reported in magazines during the 1950s.

They had two sons, Edward and Jeffrey, both of their sons went on to be physicians. Jeffrey was the first black child to attend kindergarten at the Sidwell Friends School in 1956. As a direct result, Senator James Eastland, an anti-integrationist from Mississippi withdrew his son from the school.

== Death ==
Mazique died Dec. 26, 1987, at a hospital in Barbados after a heart attack, while on vacation.
