= West Indian Students' Centre =

London meeting-place

The West Indian Students' Centre (WISC) was located at 1 Collingham Gardens, Earls Court, London, in a building bought with the support of West Indian governments, and officially opened on 1 June 1955 by Princess Margaret. Hosting activities and events primarily for students from the West Indies, WISC also became a key London venue for others from the African diaspora, and provided facilities and a meeting place for such organisations as the West Indian Standing Committee, the Commission for Racial Equality, and the Caribbean Artists Movement (CAM), which latter grouping held regular public sessions there from March 1967.

Among leaders from the Caribbean who when visiting the UK made a point of speaking at meetings organised at WISC were Norman Manley, Eric Williams, Forbes Burnham, and Cheddi Jagan. It also hosted American Civil Rights activists James Baldwin and Dick Gregory in 1968, documented in Horace Ové's short film Baldwin's Nigger (1969). Recalling London in the 1960s, Trinidadian-British cultural activist Ansel Wong has said: "The West Indian Students Centre in Earl's Court was a key focal point at the time. It was there that I encountered some of my major influences, like the Caribbean Artists Movement, which was set up by writers such as Andrew Salkey and John La Rose. As young students they had almost a celebrity status for us: we were emboldened by them, as well as by the politics of people such as the radical activist Michael X."

Now located in the building that formerly housed the West Indian Students' Centre are the High Commission of Saint Lucia and the High Commission of Dominica.

== See also ==
- West Indian Students Union
- West African Students' Union
