= West Indian Students Union =

London association of students from the Caribbean

The West Indian Students Union (WISU) was established in London, England, in 1946, with the aim of promoting fellowship among and offering assistance to the growing number of West Indian students arriving in Britain for further and higher education. Early members who become notable politicians include Michael Manley, Errol Barrow, Linden Forbes Burnham, Maurice Bishop, Lee Llewellyn Moore, Eugenia Charles, and many members went on to achieve prominence in other fields, such as historian Elsa Goveia. WISU's base was at the West Indian Students' Centre in Earl's Court, and in later years members included activist Ansel Wong, who chaired WISU during the early 1970s, editing a number of their publications and contributing articles.

== Background ==
According to historian Marc Matera, "Black organizations like the West African Students Union, League of Coloured Peoples and, after 1945, the West Indian Students Union called upon students to combine assiduous study and political activism in their endeavors, while working to establish mechanisms by which this might take place. ...In December 1945, 113 students registered for the first West Indian Students' Conference in London and established the West Indian Students Union."

== See also ==
- West Indian Students' Centre
