= B. W. Higman =

Australian historian of Caribbean studies (born 1943)

- Born: Barry William Higman; 30 September 1943 (age 83); Wagga Wagga, Australia
- Education: University of Sydney; University of the West Indies; University of Liverpool
- Occupation: Historian
- Awards: Musgrave Medal (1992)

Barry William Higman (born 30 September 1943) is a retired Australian historian of Caribbean studies who primarily taught at the University of the West Indies from 1971 to 1996. During his career, Higman wrote multiple books, including the 1977 Bancroft Prize-winning work Slave Population and Economy in Jamaica, 1807–1834, before his retirement from academics in 2014. He was awarded a Guggenheim Fellowship in 1987 and the Musgrave Medal in 1992.

== Early life and education ==
On 30 September 1943, Higman was born in Wagga Wagga, Australia. For his post-secondary education, he graduated from the University of Sydney in 1967 with a Bachelor of Arts before obtaining Doctor of Philosophy degrees at the University of the West Indies in 1967 and the University of Liverpool in 1971.

== Career ==
Higman began his academic career in 1971 teaching at the University of the West Indies as a lecturer. He took a leave of absence in the late 1970s when he became a fellow at Princeton University in the history department. During his academic career, Higman wrote multiple books focusing on Caribbean history including Slave Population and Economy in Jamaica, 1807–1834, which was awarded the 1977 Bancroft Prize. Higman resumed his teaching with UWI in the late 1970s and became a history professor with the university in 1983. While working in history, Higman completed a three-year tenure as the history department chair in the mid 1980s and the early 1990s. In 1996, Higman left UWI to become a teacher at the Australian National University before his retirement in 2014.

== Awards and honors ==
Higman was awarded a Guggenheim Fellowship in 1987 for studies in Iberian and Latin American history. Outside of the United States, Higman became a Fellow of the Royal Historical Society in 1988 and received the Musgrave Medal in 1992.

== Selected publications ==
- Slave Population and Economy in Jamaica, 1807–1834
- How Food Made History
- A Concise History of the Caribbean
- Plantation Jamaica, 1750-1850: Capital and Control in a Colonial Economy
- Jamaican Food
- Montpelier, Jamaica: A Plantation Community in Slavery and Freedom 1739–1912
- Jamaican Place Names
- Jamaica Surveyed: Plantation Maps and Plans of the Eighteenth and Nineteenth Centuries
