= Jewell Mazique =

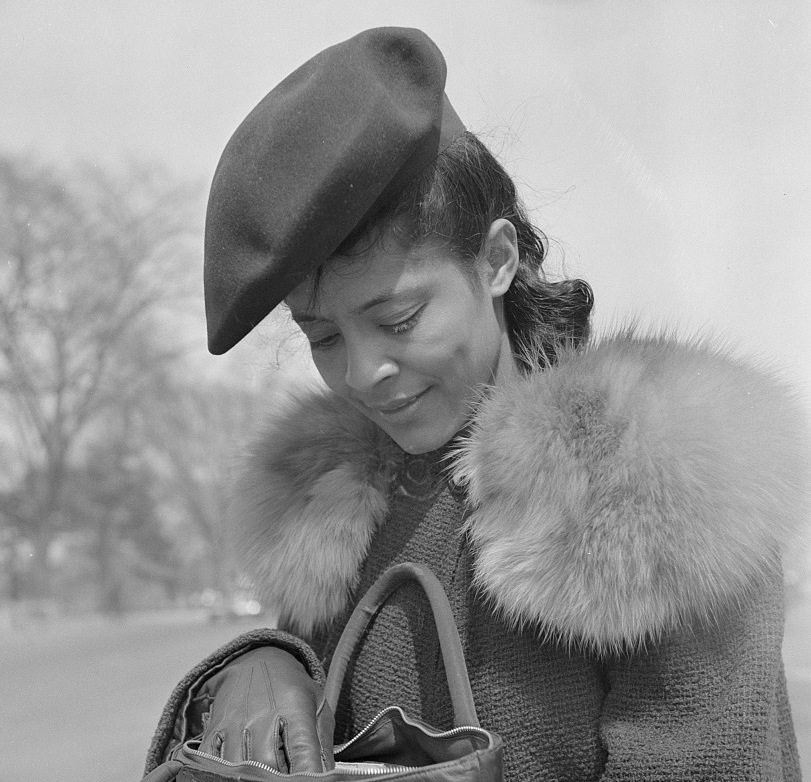
- Mazique in March 1943
- Born: Jewell Crawford; October 2, 1913
- Died: September 18, 2007 (aged 93); Washington, D.C., United States
- Education: Spelman College; Howard University
- Occupation: Activist

Jewell R. Mazique (October 2, 1913 – September 18, 2007) was an activist who helped found the Capital Transit campaign with United Federal Workers to integrate Washington D.C.'s bus operators. Mazique wrote extensively for The Washington Afro-American newspaper on topics such as the United Nations position on African Nations, and how black children were being educated in DC schools. She served on the National Council for the Southern Negro Youth Congress in 1945, a group claimed to be a Communist front organization.

She was the subject of a U.S. Government Office of War Information documentary photo series in 1943 while she was a clerk at the Library of Congress. The photos, taken by John Collier, were supposedly depicting a day in the life of a typical black Washingtonian, but critics argued that the photos were "less picturesque and less a credit to freedom's national seat" than a typical day of an average black woman in Washington D.C.

Mazique graduated from Spelman College and received a master's degree in African Studies from Howard University, where she wrote her thesis on the development of the Federation of Rhodesia and Nyasaland. Mazique argued her own acrimonious divorce case despite the court's requests to take legal counsel. She kept her children, but lost her case for personal financial support.

== Personal life ==
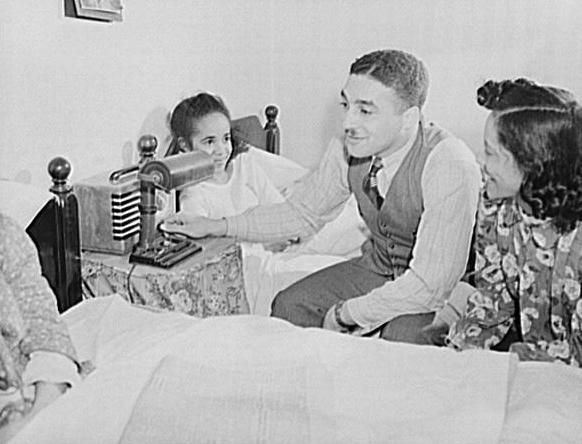
Dr Mazique and Jewell Mazique and "one of their nieces whom they are rearing"

Mazique was married to Edward Craig Mazique in 1937, separated in 1961, and divorced in 1965. They had two sons, Edward and Jeffrey. Jeffrey was the first black child to attend kindergarten at the Sidwell Friends School in 1956. As a direct result, Senator James Eastland, an anti-integrationist from Mississippi, withdrew his son from the school.

Jewell Mazique preferred to be involved with social causes more than having a social life, stating in an interview: "The frills of social life hold no charms for me, I am more concerned for instance with what the political leaders of Paris decided to do about their colonial possessions than what the Paris designers decide about what women will wear".

=== Divorce ===
Mazique decided that her marriage to Edward could not continue although she did waver in her decision. Eventually Edward started divorce proceedings on the grounds of desertion. Mazique hired a number of lawyers before she decided that she could do a better job herself. The divorce was very public and at one point Jewell's friends appeared with placards outside the Park Sheraton Hotel in Washington in support of her divorce case. The location was chosen as Marguerite Belafonte had a fashion show there and she was seeing Edward Mazique. One placard read: "Let Not Justice Be Rationed to Jewell R. Mazique in Domestic Relations Court". Jewell's friend wrote to the newspapers and they formed a committee to support her. The case was settled in her husband's favour and it was noted that Jewell had argued her own case despite the court's advice. She argued, unsuccessfully, that she had worked to put her husband through medical school and that the court had ignored their expensive home. Jewell appealed the case and particularly the finances arguing that the court was biased toward men. She lost the appeal in 1965. Mazique kept her children and Edward agreed to pay maintenance, but she lost her case for personal financial support. The court ruled that her case was a fabrication. Both of her sons went on to be physicians.
