= Elsa Goveia =

Guyanese historian (1925–1980)

- Elsa Goveia
- Born: Elsa Vesta Goveia; 12 April 1925; British Guiana (present-day Guyana)
- Died: 18 March 1980 (aged 54); Hope Mews, Kingston, Jamaica
- Education: University College London (Honours degree); Institute of Historical Research (PhD)
- Occupations: Academic, historian, writer
- Years active: 1950–1980
- Notable work: Slave Society in the British Leeward Islands at the End of the Eighteenth Century (1965)

Elsa Vesta Goveia (12 April 1925 – 18 March 1980) was a Guyanese historian who taught at the University College of the West Indies (UCWI, called the University of the West Indies after 1962) (Note: UCWI changed its name to the University of the West Indies (UWI) in 1962 when it was given independent degree-granting status.) from 1950 to 1980. Born in British Guiana (present-day Guyana), she was an exceptional student, becoming the first woman to receive the competitive British Guiana Scholarship. In 1945, she enrolled at University College London, where she became the first West Indian person to receive the Pollard Prize for English History. After graduating with an honours degree in history in 1948, she pursued a PhD at the Institute of Historical Research.

In 1950, Goveia joined UCWI faculty as an assistant lecturer. After successfully defending her thesis in 1952, she was promoted to full lecturer, and in 1956, she published A Study of the Historiography of the British West Indies. From 1956 to 1957, she served as the interim head of UCWI's history department, after which she was promoted to senior lecturer. In 1961, she contracted a debilitating illness. While she continued to participate in academic activities, including the publication of her thesis as a book titled Slave Society in the British and Leeward Islands at the End of the Eighteenth Century in 1965, she eventually died of this illness in 1980. Historians such as Brian L. Moore consider her to have been an important figure in promoting the study of Caribbean history, and she is credited by historian Barry W. Higman as a key figure in developing the idea of the slave society.

== Early life and education ==
Elsa Vesta Goveia was born on 12 April 1925 in British Guiana (present-day Guyana) into a middle-class family. One of two daughters, Goveia's family was mixed Afro-Guyanese and Portuguese. In 1915, she received a scholarship to St. Joseph’s Roman Catholic high school for girls at the Convent of Mercy in Georgetown. At the time, education beyond primary school was rare for boys and even more rare for girls. An excellent student, she graduated around 1943 and received the competitive British Guiana Scholarship. She was the first woman to do so.

World War II delayed her from continuing her education, but she enrolled at University College London in 1945, where she pursued an honours degree in history. She was a member of the West Indian Students Union, an organization that aimed to promote West Indian unity by launching a newspaper aimed at fostering Caribbean culture, launching a study group and lobbying for the creation of a West Indian university. In 1947, she received the Pollard Prize for English History, becoming the first West Indian person to do so. She graduated with first-class honours in 1948. That same year, the University College of the West Indies (UCWI) was established in Mona, Jamaica.

After graduating, Goveia pursued her doctorate at the Institute of Historical Research. She studied under the supervision of historian Eveline Martin in London until 1950, when she became an assistant lecturer at UCWI, teaching classes about West Indian and United States history. While there, she advocated for the inclusion of Caribbean history in educational curricula throughout the Anglophone Caribbean and helped create a policy making Caribbean history mandatory for all students at UCWI. She also advocated for a graduate research programme at UCWI and worked on her thesis, which she successfully defended in 1952.

== Academic career ==
After receiving her PhD, Goveia became a full lecturer at UCWI in 1952. In 1956, she published A Study of the Historiography of the British West Indies, a comprehensive account of the historiography, or historical writing, on the British West Indies published between the 17th and 19th centuries. Originally published in Mexico by the Pan American Institute of Geography and History, the book was "very well-received" according to Goveia. From 1956 to 1957, after the departure of the head of the history department, J. H. Parry, Goveia served as the interim department head until the arrival of Archibald Paton Thornton, who took over the position. After Thornton's arrival, Goveia was promoted to senior lecturer.

In 1961, Goveia was struck with a debilitating illness, which she suffered from until her death. Despite this, she became a member of the New World Group. Established in 1963, this group advocated for the spread of information about the culture, economy, politics, and society of the Caribbean. She also criticised the prime minister of Trinidad and Tobago, Eric Williams, for his book British Historians and the West Indies, published in 1964. In her review, she calls the book "disappointing" and "somewhat irresponsible", though she acknowledges that it is "good in parts". In 1965, she published her thesis as a book titled Slave Society in the British and Leeward Islands at the End of the Eighteenth Century. Historian Brian L. Moore considers this book her "magnum opus". She also chaired the Caribbean Archives conference at the newly renamed University of the West Indies that year.

== Death and legacy ==
On 18 March 1980, Goveia died at her home in Hope Mews, Kingston, Jamaica, of the illness she contracted in 1961. She was 54. At the time of her death, she was the longest-serving West Indian professor at UWI. Since 1984, the Association of Caribbean Historians has awarded the Elsa Goveia Prize to scholars who have exhibited excellence in the study of Caribbean history. In 1985, (Note: Moore & Higman claim that the lectures were inaugurated in 1986, but contemporary news coverage indicates that the first lecture took place on 14 March 1985.) a lecture series called the Elsa Goveia Memorial Lectures was inaugurated to highlight scholarship on the history of the Caribbean. These lectures are funded by the campus principal's and vice chancellor's offices and well-regarded in academic circles. According to Moore, Goveia was "instrumental in establishing Caribbean history as a distinctive and respected field of study".

== Writing ==
Goveia's Slave Society in the British and Leeward Islands at the End of the Eighteenth Century, in contrast to political and economic histories of the region, aims to "analyse how the society [of the British and Leeward Islands] functioned and to analyse its internal structure". According to Goveia, the "principle of social organization" in the region was slavery. Building on the Gramscian idea of hegemony, (Note: A word used by philosopher Antonio Gramsci to describe the ruling class's use of intellectual and moral leadership to legitimize their control of institutions.) she argues that the energy used to justify masters' domination of their slaves based on racial hierarchies made this relationship of domination seem natural. Historian Barry W. Higman argues that Goveia was one of the key figures in the development of the idea of the slave society, which, according to Goveia, was a "community based on slavery". However, he ultimately concludes that the concept originated with Irish political economist John Elliott Cairnes.

Historian Mary Chamberlain argues that, at a time when historians mainly focused on the colonial elite, Goveia's historiographic approach was unique. She further argues that Goveia's thesis is indicative of her personal approach to Caribbean history. According to Chamberlain, Goveia believed the poverty and racism common in the Caribbean have their roots in historical slave societies and that it is historians' responsibility to confront these histories.

In A Study of the Historiography of the British West Indies, Goveia discusses over 70 works, providing background and discussing the views on West Indian history they present. She argues that West Indian historians are tasked with "discovering the principle of change" and "seek[ing], beyond the narrative of events, a wider understanding of the thoughts, habits, and institutions of a whole society". She also argues that humanism is as important as detachment for historical analysis. Higman takes this as an argument in favor of social history, which he argues would have been "revolutionary" at the time. Race and racism are major themes of the book, which includes extended discussions of race relations in the region before and after the abolition of slavery.

According to historian Mary Turner, the book should be viewed in the context of renewed nationalism in the West Indies after World War II. She argues that it should be viewed as a "propaganda piece" designed to combat, "in a scholarly way", the "influences which taught West Indians to view their countries as very small specks in the great pink spaces marked out on the world map of British Imperial hegemony".

== Sources ==
- Chamberlain, Mary (2004). "Elsa Goveia: History and Nation". History Workshop Journal. 58 (1): 167–190. doi:10.1093/hwj/58.1.167. ISSN 1477-4569.
- "Dr. Elsa Goveia is dead". The Daily Gleaner. Kingston, Jamaica. 20 March 1980 – via NewspaperArchive.
- "Inaugural Elsa Goveia Memorial Lecture". The Daily Gleaner. Kingston, Jamaica. 14 March 1985 – via NewspaperArchive.
- Engerman, Stanley L. (1981). "A Study on the Historiography of the British West Indies to the End of the Nineteenth Century (Review)". The Journal of Economic History. 41 (3): 692–693. doi:10.1017/S0022050700044600. ISSN 0022-0507.
- Goveia, Elsa V. (1984). "A Tribute to Elsa V. Goveia". Caribbean Quarterly. 30 (3/4): 2–6. ISSN 0008-6495. JSTOR 40653546.
- Goveia, Elsa V. (1964). "Eric Williams, British Historians and the West Indies (Book Review)". Caribbean Quarterly. 10 (2): 48. ISSN 0008-6495.
- Goveia, Elsa V. (1980). Slave Society in the British Leeward Islands at the End of the Eighteenth Century. Greenwood. ISBN 978-0-313-22156-9.
- "History". The University of the West Indies, Mona, Jamaica.
- Higman, B. W. (1999). Winks, Robin (ed.). The Oxford History of the British Empire: Volume V: Historiography. Oxford: OUP Oxford. pp. 134–145. ISBN 978-0-19-154241-1.
- Moore, Brian L.; Higman, B. W. (2003). Slavery, Freedom and Gender: The Dynamics of Caribbean Society. Kingston: University of the West Indies Press. ISBN 978-976-640-137-5.
- Moore, Brian L. (2016). "Goveia, Elsa Vesta". In Knight, Franklin W.; Gates, Jr., Henry Louis (eds.). Dictionary of Caribbean and Afro–Latin American Biography. Oxford University Press.
- "Past Elsa Goveia Award Recipients". Association of Caribbean Historians. 2010. Archived from the original on 17 November 2016.
- Prono, Luca (2008). "Hegemony". In Stearns, Peter N. (ed.). The Oxford Encyclopedia of the Modern World. Oxford University Press.
- Springer, H. W. (1962). "The Historical Development, Hopes and Aims of the University College of the West Indies". The Journal of Negro Education. 31 (1): 8. doi:10.2307/2294532.
- Turner, Mary (1988). "A Study on the Historiography of the British West Indies to the End of the Nineteenth Century (Review)". Caribbean Studies. 20 (3/4). Institute of Caribbean Studies, UPR, Rio Piedras Campus: 97–104. ISSN 0008-6533. JSTOR 25612921.
