= Kick It Out (organisation) =

Campaign in football against racism

- Founded: 1993
- Location: England, United Kingdom
- Key people: Lord Ouseley
- Website: kickitout.org

Kick It Out was established as a campaign with the brand name 'Let's Kick Racism Out of Football' in 1993 and as an organisation in 1997. The organisation works within the football, educational and community sectors to challenge discrimination, encourage inclusive practices and work for positive change.

The campaign is supported and funded by the game's governing bodies, including founding body the Professional Footballers' Association (PFA), the Premier League and the Football Association (FA).

Internationally, Kick It Out plays a leading role in the Football Against Racism in Europe (FARE) network and has been cited as an example of good practice by the European governing body UEFA, the world governing body FIFA, the Council of Europe, the European Commission, European parliamentarians and the British Council.

Former footballer Paul Elliott left his role at Kick It Out on 23 February 2013, following a reported text conversation in which "discriminatory abusive comments" were made to fellow former footballer Richard Rufus.

== Campaigns ==
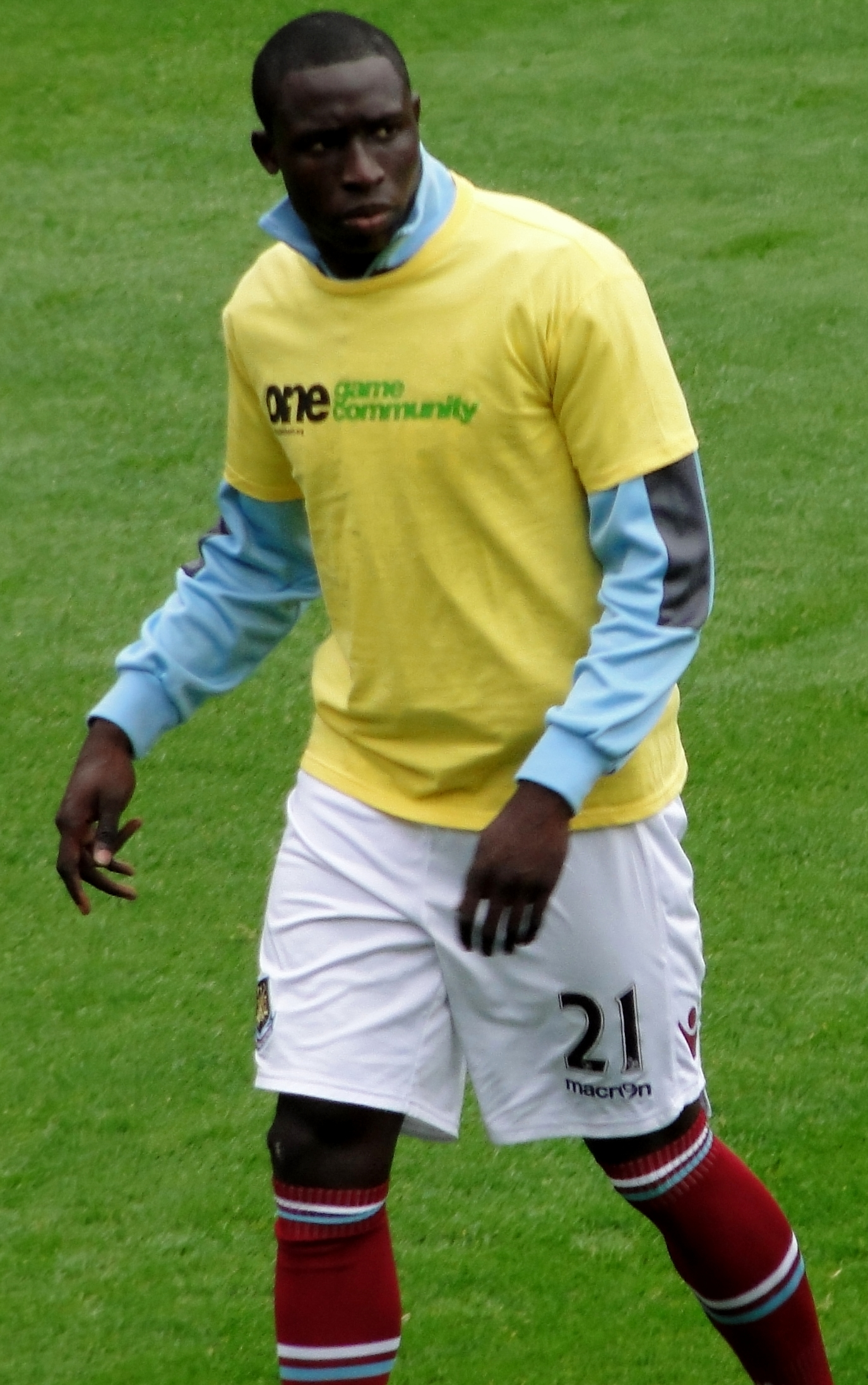
West Ham United player Mohamed Diamé wearing a Kick It Out t-shirt before a game

Kick It Out provides a facility for football lovers to report incidents of abuse, both via its website, and through a mobile phone app. It also works closely with other organisations to raise awareness of the impact of social media upon football-related hate crime and positively influence users. Many of Kick It Out's campaigns focus upon actions to promote equality, diversity, understanding and tolerance through community action throughout football, from grassroots to professional level. Kick it Out enjoys a mutually supportive relationship with the Football Supporters' Federation.

In April 2019, The Times manifesto to challenge racism and advocate greater diversity in the sport was compiled under the guidance of Kick It Out and other organisations. The manifesto was signed by Raheem Sterling, Andy Cole, Eni Aluko, and Sadiq Khan, among others.

Following the COVID-19 pandemic in the United Kingdom with black men and women were nearly twice as likely to die with COVID-19 as white people, Kick It Out's head of development, Troy Townsend, voiced his concerns regarding the restart of the Premier League following its suspension due to the outbreak of the virus. At the time black players represented over a quarter of all players in the league.

== Education and Training ==
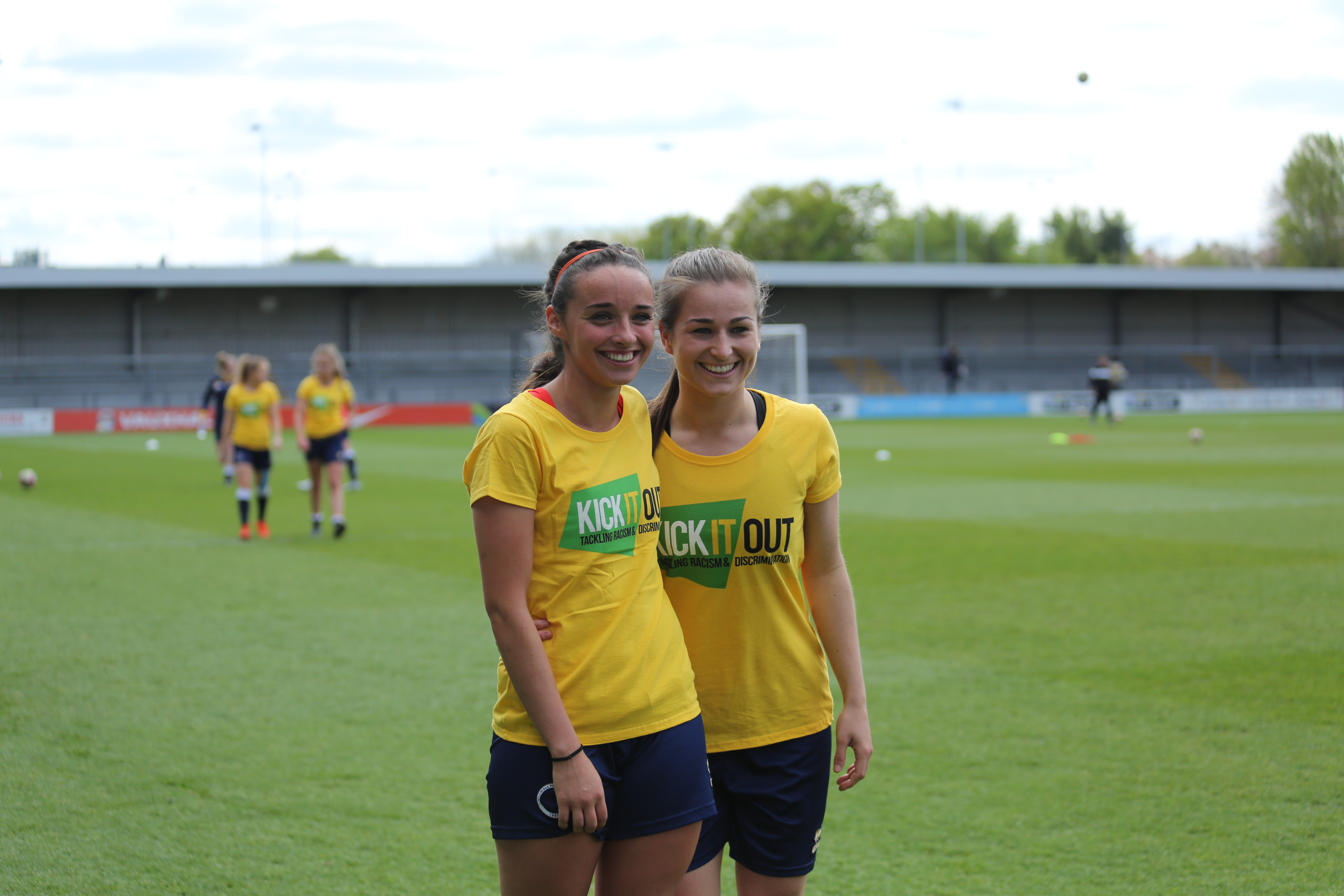
Millwall Lionesses players promoting Kick It out before a FA WSL match

Kick It Out continues to lead and co-ordinate equality and diversity training for professional footballers at all levels. It also provides support in the form of mentoring for young people who aspire to careers in the football industry through its annual Raise Your Game conferences as, well as working closely to promote equality and diversity within the amateur game.

In 2015, Kick It Out entered into a partnership with Southampton Solent University to provide the Equality and Diversity in Football Award. This course of study aims to develop participants' understanding of the issues which impact on the promotion of equality and the development of diversity in football, as well as providing an opportunity to identify and enhance the personal qualities and skills that are essential to effective leadership.

== Criticism ==
Kick It Out has come under criticism from ethnic minorities in the industry for not having a big enough effect on the punishment of players and fans convicted of racist abuse. In 2007, Everton player Joleon Lescott refused to wear the Kick It Out T-shirt before games after Newcastle United's Emre Belözoğlu escaped punishment for alleged racial abuse against Everton player Joseph Yobo. Lescott and teammate Tim Howard had given written evidence to the FA inquiry.

In the autumn of 2012, at the end of a footballing week marred by racial abuse and violence in an international under-21 fixture between England and Serbia, the campaign organised for Premier League players to wear shirts bearing the organisation's logo before their matches. However, the directive was boycotted by several black players, including Manchester United's Rio Ferdinand, Reading's Jason Roberts, and Manchester City's Micah Richards in protest against the lack of action by the organisation in the wake of high-profile cases of footballers racially abusing their opponents during matches. Lescott also reiterated his stance.

== See also ==
- Show Racism the Red Card
