= Herman Ouseley, Baron Ouseley =

British public official and parliamentarian (1945–2024)

The Right Honourable The Lord Ouseley
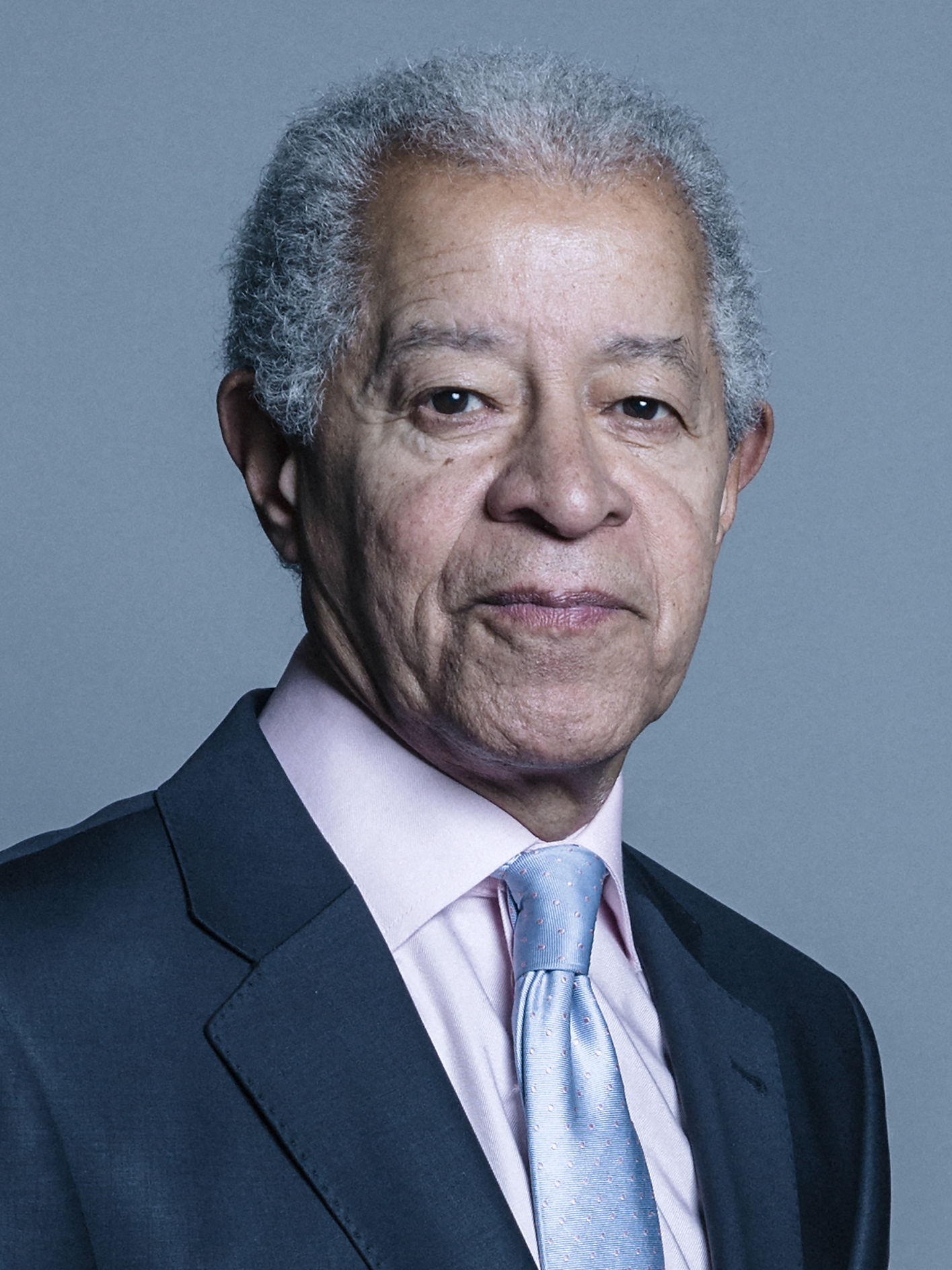
- Official portrait, 2018

Member of the House of Lords
- Lord Temporal
- Life peerage 26 June 2001 – 24 May 2019

Personal details
- Born: Herman George Ouseley; 24 March 1945 British Guiana
- Died: 2 October 2024 (aged 79)

Herman George Ouseley, Baron Ouseley (24 March 1945 – 2 October 2024) was a British parliamentarian. Before becoming a member of the House of Lords he was an important figure in public authorities, including local councils, and was an adviser and reviewer of public services organisations with a particular focus on equality and diversity. He was at the forefront of challenging institutional racism in organisations and was an advocate on behalf of individuals from disadvantaged and deprived backgrounds.

Ouseley sat in the House of Lords as an crossbencher from 2001 until his retirement in 2019. He was also included in the 2003 list of "100 Great Black Britons".

Ouseley was a supporter of Millwall and Rangers.

== Early life ==
Herman Ouseley is born in British Guiana in 1945 and migrated to England in 1957 when he was 11 years old. He was educated at William Penn School and at Catford College, where he gained a diploma in municipal administration.

== Career ==
Ouseley was a local government officer between 1963 and 1993. He was appointed the first principal race relations advisor in local government. From 1981, he served as principal race relations adviser and head of the Greater London Council's Ethnic Minority Unit. He later became chief executive of the London Borough of Lambeth and the former Inner London Education Authority (the first black person to hold such an office), responsible for over 1000 schools and colleges across the capital. Ouseley was chair and chief executive in the Commission for Racial Equality from 1993 to 2000.

From 1996, he was a director of Brookmight Security and, from 2000, of Focus Consultancy. He was managing director of Different Realities Partnership between 2000 and 2005, then subsequently a self-employed management consultant undertaking reviews of organisations' performance and assignments in pursuit of equality and diversity outcomes.

== Work on racism ==
In 1993, Ouseley set up the project to tackle racism in football and was chairman of Kick It Out, the well-known campaign to make football free from discrimination and abuse and to be more inclusive of people of all backgrounds. Ouseley did not receive a salary for his work for Kick It Out.

== Other activities ==
From 1997, Ouseley chaired the Chandran Foundation (formerly Preset Education Charity) that provided specialist education provision for young people with learning disadvantages. He was a council member for the Institute of Relations, a think tank focused on challenging injustices and inequalities. He was also on the board of directors of the Manchester United Foundation and was a lifelong fan of Manchester United. He also supported his local team, Millwall, and Dulwich Hamlet, one of the local teams he played for in his youth.

== Death ==
Ouseley died shortly after being diagnosed with a terminal illness on 2 October 2024, at the age of 79.

== Honours ==
Ouseley was made a Knight Bachelor in the 1997 New Year Honours for "services to community relations and local government", and was made a life peer as Baron Ouseley, of Peckham Rye in the London Borough of Southwark on 26 June 2001.

Ouseley had 13 honorary degrees: from the Universities of Edinburgh, Sheffield Hallam, Bradford, Leicester, Leeds Met, Warwick, Oxford Brookes, Greenwich, London South Bank, London Metropolitan, North East London, Staffordshire, and Brighton.

== Works ==
- The System (1981)
