= List of Barbadian artists =

This is a list of Barbadian artists, either from Barbados or associated with Barbados, including sculptors, ceramists, painters, photographers and designers.

== A ==
- Ras Akyem, painter from Barbados.

== B ==
- Karl Broodhagen (1909–2002), sculptor from Barbados.
- Edward Rupert Burrowes (1903–1966), artist and art teacher born in Barbados.

== C ==
- Alison Chapman-Andrews (born 1942), painter who lives and works in Barbados.
- Jeena Chatrani, painter from Barbados.

== D ==
- Paul Dash (born 1946), artist born in Barbados.
- Annalee Davis (born 1963), visual artist from Barbados.

== G ==
- Stanley Greaves (born 1934), painter and educator who taught in Barbados.

== J ==
- William Johnston (painter) (1732–1772), painter lived and died in Barbados.

== K ==
- Gwendolyn Knight (1913–2005), American artist born in Bridgetown, Barbados.

== P ==
- Coral Bernadine Pollard (born c. 1940) artist and muralist from Barbados.

== R ==
- Sheena Rose (born 1985), multidisciplinary artist from Barbados.

== S ==
- Kara Springer, designer and artist born in Barbados.

== See also ==
- List of Barbadians
