= Free Painters and Sculptors =

Artist organisation in London

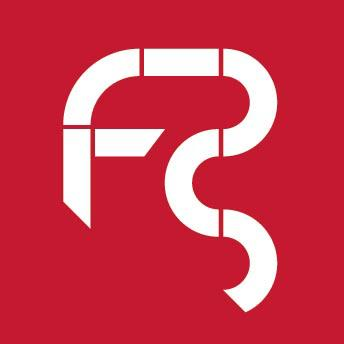
- Established: 1952
- Type: Artist Organisation
- Legal status: Registered Charity
- Location: London
- Website: www.freepaintersandsculptors.co.uk

Free Painters and Sculptors (FPS) is an artist-led organisation based in London, England, which regularly exhibits every year. It played a pivotal role in the establishment of abstract art in the 1950s and 1960s.

== History ==
=== Background ===
FPS was founded in 1952 by a number of members of the ICA who wanted to create their own painting group. Known initially as 'Painters Group from the ICA', the idea of freedom was one of the group's core beliefs. In the aftermath of World War II it was vital for the group to be able to stand for principles of artistic freedom and each artist was free to express themselves however they chose. Artists with a 'modern approach' were welcomed, generally falling into abstract or figurative camps.

=== Formative years ===
The first exhibition was held at the end of 1953 in the Three Arts Centre, Great Cumberland Place and was opened by art critic John Berger. Twenty six artists exhibited.

Soon after this the group was renamed the 'Free Painters Group' and annual exhibitions followed in Walker's Galleries on New Bond Street. There were also satellite exhibitions in the New Vision Centre Gallery on Seymour Place, Marble Arch and the Drian Gallery on Porchester Place, Bayswater.

These three galleries were early natural homes for the group: The Walker's Galleries had been the location of the first exhibition of the Seven and Five Society - a natural predecessor of the Free Painters Group; New Vision Centre Gallery was run by members Denis Bowen, Halima Nalecz and Frank Avray Wilson and was a hub for the avant-garde and experimental. Halima Nalecz also ran the Drian Gallery and many exhibitions were held there by members over the years.

=== Middle years ===
In the early 1960s the group began to stage exhibitions at the FBA Galleries in Suffolk Street, Pall Mall. This larger venue was well suited to the growing number of members and also was able to house larger works that were created.

With this increasing membership and more sculptors in the group, in 1965 'Free Painters Group' was renamed to its current name of 'Free Painters and Sculptors'. Also at this time, FPS became a registered charity.

Exhibitions were gathering more interest and garnered reviews in local and national press. As well as an annual exhibition (now branded 'Trends'), many members staged exhibitions around the UK as well as overseas.

In the early 1970s a desire to find venues aside from the annual exhibition was facilitated by the then-secretary of the group Nina Hosali. Nina's mother Kate Hosali had founded the Society for Protection of Animals in North Africa (SPANA) in 1923 and the headquarters were at their home at 15 Buckingham Gate. The property was used by the free painters for meetings and storage space and in 1972 the loggia in its gardens was turned into a permanent gallery space - the Loggia Gallery and Sculpture Garden.

In 1973 'Trends' moved to the Mall Galleries, Pall Mall and exhibited there until the next decade.

Membership by the mid-1970s had grown rapidly and was at a peak of nearly 500.

=== Later years ===
The 1980s saw the group achieve a milestone of 30 years but the period saw challenges. The group had healthy number of members but had to work hard to ensure that quality remained high. In addition, founding members were reaching old age and retirement and their loss was felt. Lastly, societal changes meant whereas the group had always been London focussed, it had to look outwards as artists left London.

However, these challenges created interesting opportunities whereby exhibitions outside of London were staged and new blood was found. A new generation of artists joined the ranks and thus kept the group relevant and vital. Exhibitions continued to be held at the London venue of the Loggia Gallery although other suitable venues in London were harder and increasingly expensive to come by.

=== Modern era ===
FPS celebrated its 65th anniversary in 2017. It currently has over 40 members, both from the UK and overseas. Membership is granted by submission of acceptable samples of work via the FPS website.

FPS exhibits at least twice year in London and the south east at venues such as the southbanks Bargehouse Gallery and Portobello's Muse gallery.

== Members ==
The following is a select list of notable members of the group throughout its lifetime.

- Anthea Alley
- Aubrey Williams
- Cecil Stephenson
- Cliff Holden
- Denis Bowen
- Dorothy Bordass
- E. L. T. Mesens
- Frank Avray Wilson
- John Pelling
- John Coplans
- Kathleen Guthrie
- Leslie Marr
- Otway McCannell
- Roderick Barrett
- Roy Turner Durrant
- Violet Fuller
- Witold Kawalec
