= Zwemmer =

Zwemmer is a surname. Notable people with the surname include:

- Anton Zwemmer (1892–1979), Dutch-born British bookseller, book distributor, art dealer, publisher and collector
- Desmond Zwemmer (1919–2000), British publisher and bookseller
- Jaap Zwemmer (born 1945), Dutch fiscal jurist
