= Cecil Stephenson =

British painter

John Cecil Stephenson (18 September 1889, in Bishop Auckland, County Durham – 1965, in London) was a British abstract artist and pioneer of Modernism.

== Biography ==
Stephenson was educated at Leeds School of Art from 1909–14, the last two years as a pupil-teacher. In 1914 he won a scholarship to the Royal College of Art and moved to London, at 6, the Mall Studios, near Hampstead, where he remained for the rest of his life. The studio had previously belonged to Walter Sickert.

In 1922, Stephenson was appointed Director of Art at the Northern Polytechnic in London, a post he retained until 1940 when he was made redundant.

In 1928, Barbara Hepworth became his next door neighbor when she moved into 7, the Mall Studios with her first husband John Skeaping. His other friends and neighbours over the years included Piet Mondrian, Henry Moore, Herbert Read, Walter Gropius, Alexander Calder and Ben Nicholson.

In 1933, along with Ben Nicholson, Stephenson exhibited for the first time with the Seven and Five Society, and in 1935 he took part in the Seven and Five's first exhibition of entirely abstract art.

In 1937, Stephenson contributed a page to Ben Nicholson, Leslie Martin and Naum Gabo's influential Circle: an international survey of Constructivist art. During the Second World War, Stephenson acted as a fire warden in London and sketched war damage in the city. His own studio was damaged during the Blitz. In 1942, Stephenson married the artist Kathleen Guthrie.

In 1961, Stephenson was elected a Fellow of Free Painters and Sculptors.

== Collections ==
Stephenson's 1937 work Painting is in the Tate collection, two works are in the Imperial War Museum collection, and his Painting II (1937) was acquired by the Scottish National Gallery of Modern Art in 2008. His works can also be found in the collections of the Arts Council of Great Britain, Staatsgalerie Stuttgart, the National Museum, Warsaw, the British Museum, the V&A, the National Museum Wales and the Government Art Collection.

== Exhibitions ==
Stephenson exhibited widely throughout his life and posthumously, and was included in the following significant exhibitions:

- 1933: Seven & Five Society
- 1935: Seven & Five Abstract Group
- 1939: Abstract Work, Artists International Association, Whitechapel Art Gallery
- 1951: Luminescent Ceiling Decoration in the Pavilion of Power and Production at the Festival of Britain, 10 × 30 feet, executed in fluorescent colours and illuminated by ultra-violet mercury lamps.
- 1953: exhibited for the first time with the London Group
- 1961: Divergencies, Qantas Gallery, Piccadilly, an exhibition by the Fellows of Free Painters and Sculptors which included Stephenson, Frank Avray Wilson, Cliff Holden, E. L. T. Mesens, Denis Bowen, Roy Turner Durrant and others.
- 1965: Historically Important 20th Century Masters, Drian Gallery
- 1967: British Painting, Tate Gallery
- 1975: Retrospective exhibition, Camden Arts Centre and Laing Art Gallery
- 2007: British Art, 1900–2007, Tate Britain
- 2008: In Memoriam Halina Nałęcz exhibition at the National Museum, Warsaw
- 2011: John Cecil Stephenson: Pioneer of Modernism, Durham Art Gallery
