= The Olmec-Maya and Now =

Series of paintings by Aubrey Williams

- Olmec Maya - Now and Coming Time (1985)
- Artist: Aubrey Williams
- Year: 1981–1985
- Medium: Oil on canvas
- Subject: Parallels between pre-Columbian Olmec and Maya civilizations and contemporary global culture

The Olmec-Maya and Now (1981–1985) is a series of large, oil-on-canvas paintings by Aubrey Williams. The series grew out of Williams' enduring interest in pre-Columbian cultures of the indigenous peoples of the Americas (he himself claimed Carib ancestry). It explores parallels between Olmec and Maya civilizations and contemporary global culture, focusing in particular on the threat of rapid demise and self-destruction.

== Background ==
Williams' interest in the pre-Columbian cultures of the Americas first developed while he was living and working among the Warao people in the north-west region of Guyana (now Region One) in the 1940s. Although he had been painting and drawing for many years, he claimed that it was among the Warao that he "discovered [him]self as an artist" and "started to understand what art really is". This experience triggered an involvement with pre-Columbian art and artefacts that he described in 1987 as "the core of his artistic activity". Williams found a precedent for the kinds of abstraction he used in his own paintings in pre-Columbian arts and, across the years, repeatedly incorporated images, iconography and motifs drawn from these arts into his work.

By 1981, Williams was working mainly in a studio in Florida, while maintaining bases in the United Kingdom and Jamaica. He was working towards the completion of another large series of paintings, Shostakovich (1969-1981), which was exhibited for the first time in October of that year.

== Style and themes ==
The paintings in The Olmec-Maya and Now combine abstract expressionism with figurative depictions of Olmec and Maya icons, symbols and artefacts. Williams' re-introduction of figurative elements into his paintings marked an important stylistic departure from his earlier work, such as the Shostakovich series, which was entirely abstract. Art critics Mel Gooding, Reyahn King and Leon Wainwright have noted that the fusion of abstraction and figuration challenged viewers, artists and critics, who were used to "artistic rules" that kept them apart. Williams himself described this stylistic change as a "wonderful artistic jump". In an interview in 1987 he explained that approximately ten years earlier, around 1977, he had felt himself to be at risk of "only making paintings [...] like making wall furniture" and of hiding within "borrowed" forms. He therefore decided to "go right back" – to go back to doing figurative work which incorporated "the symbolic artefacts of [his] own past culture" – so that his work was "no longer recognisable".

Thematically, the series explores parallels between what Williams describes as "Maya mistakes" and comparable developments in "modern humanity". In a note composed for the first exhibition of the series, he explained:

The Maya, the greatest Civilization of their time [...] a people who produced a technology from which we are still learning today; these people vanished in a very short space of time [..] due, I feel, to their inability to cope with their technology and the changes their achievements engendered within the metabolism of their living environment and ecology; exactly the position we find ourselves in today.

In 1987, Williams added that everything else in his art was "ancillary" to "the burning urge" to express these parallels.

== Exhibitions and collections ==
The Olmec-Maya and Now was first exhibited at the Commonwealth Institute in London in June 1985. In 1989, the artist Denis Bowen remembered it as "a major exhibition with a significant body of work of the highest calibre" which "assure[d] [Williams'] place in the British art scene". The exhibition was opened by Terry Waite.

One of the paintings in the series, Olmec Maya—Now and Coming Time, was presented to the Tate by the Aubrey Williams Estate in 1993.
