= Robert Moskowitz =

American painter (1935–2024)

Robert Stephen Moskowitz (June 20, 1935 – March 24, 2024) was an American contemporary painter who was influenced by, among other movements, Abstract Expressionism, and gained recognition in the 1960s onward for his paintings, drawings, and prints that work in the intersection between Abstract Expressionism, Minimalism, and Pop Art.

Moskowitz was influenced during his early career by such artists as Jasper Johns and Robert Rauschenberg.

Although his work has been described as a "significant link between the Abstract Expressionism of the New York School and the 'New Image Abstraction' painters of the mid-1970s", Moskowitz received relatively little public attention and never achieved the level of fame that many of his peers did.

== Early life ==
Robert Stephen Moskowitz was born in Brooklyn, New York, on June 20, 1935. In 1948, Robert Moskowitz, son of Louis and Lily Moskowitz, who a owned dry cleaning business, was left to care for their youngest daughter, Karen, after his father left the family and his mother was forced to make occasional trips to Florida for work. He showed little artistic capability as a child, but enrolled after school at the Mechanics Institute of Manhattan to pursue engineering drafting. In 1956, he began studying at the Pratt Institute in Brooklyn where he studied under Adolph Gottlieb.

Moskowitz traveled to Europe in 1959, where he met the British collage and assemblage artist Gwyther Irwin. At Irwin's suggestion, Moskowitz moved into an artist's community outside London where he was able to purchase his first studio space for $85.00, which allowed him to remain in London for one year.

== Early work, rise to fame (1959–1963) ==
Moskowitz's first serious body of paintings came from the discovery of a window shade hanging high in his studio space. Following lessons taken from Johns, Rauschenberg, and Marcel Duchamp, Moskowitz began to place intact objects, such as the window shade, directly on his paintings as a form of collage. This work was included in the exhibition Art of Assemblage organized in 1961 at the Museum of Modern Art which also included the work of Picasso, Georges Braque, Joseph Cornell, and Robert Rauschenberg among many other influential visual artists. His work of this period, primarily untitled collage paintings, culminated in a solo exhibition at the Leo Castelli Gallery in 1962, in between solo exhibitions of Roy Lichtenstein and Frank Stella.

== Death ==
Moskowitz died from complications from Parkinson's disease on March 24, 2024, at the age of 88.
