= Metavisual Tachiste Abstract =

English painter

Metavisual Tachiste Abstract was a pivotal exhibition mounted by the Redfern Gallery, London in 1957. Subtitled 'Painting in England Today', Metavisual Tachiste Abstract ran from 4 April 1957 - 4 May 1957 . The exhibition was composed almost exclusively of works painterly abstraction and many of the leading British artists of the day exhibited works - including Peter Lanyon, Patrick Heron, Ben Nicholson, Roger Hilton, Robyn Denny, Alan Davie, Terry Frost, Sandra Blow and Gillian Ayres.

The title for the exhibition was suggested by Delia Heron and the exhibition was elected by Rex Nan Kivell and Harry Tatlock Miller (advised by Patrick Heron), partly from artists associated with the Redfern Gallery but also on a more inclusive basis, since their aim was to present the broadest range of works that fulfilled the criteria of the title.

In June 1957 the exhibition travelled, as 'Peinture Anglaise Contemporain', to the Musée des Beaux Arts, Liege where it was augmented with work by Francis Bacon, Graham Sutherland and Ivon Hitchens.

== Artists in the exhibition (listed in order of catalogue) ==
- Ralph Rumney (14 Works)
- Paul Feiler (8 Works)
- Patrick Heron (12 Works)
- Frank Avary Wilson (10 Works)
- Derek Middleton (10 Works)
- Bryan Wynter (10 Works)
- Denis Bowen (11 Works)
- Donal Hamilton Fraser (7 Works)
- Terry Frost (7 Works)
- John Coplans (10 Works)
- Rodrigo Moynihan (6 Works)
- Gillian Ayres (15 Works)
- Alan Davie (6 Works)
- Henry Cliffe (13 Works)
- Roger Hilton (11 Works)
- Gwyther Irwin (8 Works)
- William Gear (10 Works)
- Clifford Ellis (8 Works)
- Peter Kinley (9 Works)
- Robyn Denny (9 Works)
- Sandra Blow (6 Works)
- J. Milnes Smith (8 Works)
- Dorothy Bordass (15 Works)
- Peter Lanyon (6 Works)
- Cliff Holden (13 Works)
- Ian Stephenson (5 Works)
- Ben Nicholson (4 Works)
- Adrain Heath (7 Works)
- Victor Pasmore (4 Works)
- Roger Barr (13 Works)
