= WPAC =

WPAC may refer to:

- WPAC (FM), an oldies radio station in New York State
- Western Pacific Ocean, an abbreviation for the Western Pacific tropical cyclone basin often used by tropical meteorologists
- Worcester Park F.C., a sporting organization in Worcester, England
- Working People's Art Class, a former school of art in Georgetown, Guyana
