= Francis Butterfield =

English artist and journalist

- Butterfield in 1934
- Born: Francis Walter Butterfield; 1905; Bradford, England
- Died: 1968 (aged 62–63); London, England
- Education: Bradford College of Art
- Occupations: Artist, journalist

Francis Walter Butterfield (1905–1968) was an English artist and journalist. He was one of the UK's earliest abstract painters and was a member of the Seven and Five Society, which also included Barbara Hepworth, Henry Moore, Ben Nicholson and John Piper. In 1935 Butterfield's work was part of the first exhibition of entirely abstract art in Britain. One of his works is held at Shandy Hall.

== Personal life ==
Butterfield was born in Bradford, Yorkshire in 1905. He had a brother and a sister. He initially trained as a wool-stapler. In 1937 he relocated to London. After WWII he moved to Twickenham, where he lived until his death at Greenwich Hospital in 1968.

Butterfield was friends with Irish cookery writer, model and actress, Theodora FitzGibbon.

== Art career ==
In the late 1920s, while working as a wool-stapler, Butterfield attended evening classes at the Bradford College of Art, under Henry Butler and painted in his spare time. In 1929, he left full-time employment to focus solely on painting and was supported by several patrons. These included Sir Michael Sadler, who "kept him from starvation" during the first four years of his new career. He held his first London exhibition in 1934, and travelled to Spain "to find new shapes and colours".

Butterfield rented a studio on Manresa Road in London. Due to financial constraints he often used non-standard media for his paintings, including onion boxes, silver sand, red brick dust and hot glue-size.

He was a member of the Seven and Five Society (so called because the original intention of the society was to include seven painters and five sculptors). He was invited by member Ben Nicolson to exhibit alongside two other non-figurative artists - Arthur Jackson and J C Stephenson – in 1934. The following year the whole group exhibited at the Zwemmer Gallery, which became the first entirely abstract exhibition to be staged in Britain.

In 1935, a group of supporters purchased Butterfield's painting Figure Derivation for £21 (the equivalent of approximately £2,000 in 2026). The following year they offered the work to the Leeds Corporation Art Gallery, but the donation was declined by the gallery's director, Philip Hendy, who said of the work, "We thought it was – well, I'm afraid I cannot tell you what we thought, except that we did not think it was a suitable picture for inclusion in our art gallery collection."

In response, Butterfield said "Real criticism I am anxious to have. Unfortunately, real criticism can only come from competent critics… Mere indignation, vituperation or even sentimental praise I have no use for. I can say nothing to the Leeds Corporation Art Gallery sub-committee; that body of critics hasn't criticised."

Notably, by 1937, just two years later, appreciation of the avant garde had developed to such an extent that a smaller work of the same title was accepted by the same Leeds City Council, and was included in a Yorkshire Artists' Exhibition at the gallery.

Those who championed Butterfield's work included Sir Michael Sadler, Master of University College, Oxford, Francis Watson, Henry Moore and Geoffrey Grigson.

=== Exhibitions and collections ===
- 1934: Abstraction, one of several paintings created "within the last fifteen years" loaned by Sadler, master of University College, Oxford, to Highfield Hall, University College, Southampton
- 1934: Zwemmer Gallery, solo exhibition
- 1935: Zwemmer Gallery, Seven and Five's final exhibition, including Butterfield
- 1936: Wertheim Gallery, an exhibition dedicated to the work of Yorkshire artists, also including Edward Wadsworth
- 1937: Leeds City Art Gallery, Yorkshire Artists' Exhibition
- 1937: Leicester Galleries exhibited 30 of Butterfield's drawings alongside paintings by Moïse Kisling and Marie Howet
- 1937: Figure Derivation was donated to the Leeds Art Gallery
- 1937: 41 Grosvenor Square, Artists' International Alliance exhibition alongside Henry Moore, Barbara Hepworth and Edna Ginesi
- 1938: Four of Butterfield's works, including Figure Derivation was purchased by Shrimant Apasaheb Pant, Prince of Aundh for the Raja of Aundh Museum. The Prince had seen Butterfield's Leicester Gallery exhibition, and wished to introduce abstraction to his friends in India
- 1939: Leeds City Art Gallery, Yorkshire Artists' Exhibition, including work by Barbara Hepworth, Henry Moore, Cecil Collins and Valentine Dobrée.
- 1939: Leeds University Art Society's first exhibition, also including work by Picasso, Pitchforth and ]Ernst
- 1943: Art for the People Butterfield's paintings formed part of the annual exhibition at Wakefield City Art Gallery, and was subsequently on show as part of the"Art for the People" scheme, as part of the British Institute of Adult Education for the Council for the Encouragement of Music and the Arts including exhibitions in Nuneaton and Rugby

In 2019 Leeds Art Gallery held Francis Butterfield, an exhibition to mark 50 years since Butterfield's Figurative Derivation became the first abstract work to enter the Leeds collection.

=== Selected works ===
- Whisky Bottle (1934)
- Abstraction (1934)
- Reclining Nudes (c.1939-1940)
- Figure Derivation
- Landscape in Sussex
- Landscape in Buckinghamshire
- Landscape in Huntingdonshire
- Derivation from a Body
- Bather: Wharfdale

== Publications ==
By 1950 Butterfield had become art editor for Courier, a magazine of "fact, fiction, art and satire". Butterfield provided line drawings for Uncle Fred by David Smith.

== Tristram Shandy ==
Butterfield was friends with the painter Kenneth Monkman, the pair having met at university. He introduced Monkman and his wife Julia to Tristram Shandy by Laurence Sterne. The couple developed a "lifelong obsession" with the novels, and subsequently became trustees of Shandy Hall, where one of Butterfield's paintings was displayed. The author Alan Bennett, a fan of Butterfield's work, paid a private visit to Shandy Hall to see the work, whereupon he became enamoured with the house itself and helped to raise funds for its upkeep.
