= Carole Steyn =

English painter

- Born: Carole Moss; 1938 (age 87–88); Manchester, England
- Education: Académie Julian; Saint Martin's School of Art; Camden Arts Centre
- Known for: Painting, sculpture, bas-relief and ceramics

Carole Steyn (née Moss; born 1938) is a British abstract and figurative painter, sculptor, pastellist and ceramicist who works with a wide range of materials and lives in London. Steyn's work draws on a range of influences, including her Russian Constructivism-inspired freestanding sculptures; and Bas-Reliefs reminiscent of Nevelson and Camargo.

== Biography ==
Steyn was born in Manchester. She studied at the Académie Julian in Paris in 1953 and the Saint Martin's School of Art from 1954 to 1956, then studied sculpture at the Camden Arts Centre in 1968. Steyn had a series of solo exhibitions at the Drian Galleries in London in the 1970s. In 1973, 1974 and 1975 Steyn exhibited with the Free Painters and Sculptors at the Mall Galleries in London. In 1974, 1975 and 1976 she exhibited with the Women's International Art Club at the Drian Galleries and Camden Arts Centre.

In 1988, Steyn featured in Out of the Doll's House, a BBC2 mini series of eight films, which explored the way women's lives have changed in the 20th century. Steyn also took part in Hanging Out, a project to explore youth culture both now and in the 1950s and 1960s. Commenting on her time at Saint Martin's School of Art during the 1950s, she said "We were called beatniks sometimes and adopted maybe some so-called Bohemian attitudes at St. Martins…".

== Early career ==
Steyn's early abstract relief work used organic materials such as eggs, nuts and seeds to create seabed effects which reflected her interest in the emotive power of the sea. Her Seabed collages captured the flow, colour and rhythm of the ocean floor. In her Blue Seabed Manifesto, Steyn said "The deep blue sea has a moody and turbulent vibe. It also bears mystical and fertility connotations."

A favourite of Drain Galleries during the 1970s and 1980s, Steyn's solo exhibitions included works using the medium of nylon bonded clay to produce rippling floriform shapes which conveyed the force of growth and the dynamic, swirling movements of water.

Steyn exhibited multiple styles of sculpture and relief for her 1981 solo show at the Drian which celebrated themes centred around nature, life and death. The Fertility section used eggs and nuts as symbols of the life force and her Flow series was a development of her 1975 exhibition. The Bones series consisted of bones constructed into collage bas-reliefs and her Universal Trees of Life works celebrated the continuity of nature.

By her 1985 solo exhibition Steyn's collages and sculptures were smaller and more painterly, exhibited alongside nine large abstract oil paintings which hinted at the essence of light. Her accompanying manifesto included the following statements: "living art is a struggle between formal perfection and creative emotion" and "my only security is the knowledge that sometimes I may be able to make something beautiful".

== Solo exhibitions ==
- 1971, Abstract relief, eggs, nuts, Drian Gallieries, London
- 1975, New Abstract reliefs, Flow period, Drian Gallieries, London
- 1981, First Retrospective Exhibition, Drian Gallieries, London
- 1985, Abstract oil paintings and new abstract collages, Drian Gallieries, London
- 1987, Reliefs and Paintings and Pastels, Jablonski Gallery, London
- 1991, Oils, Pastels, Drawings, Prints, Galerie Harounoff, London

== Group exhibitions ==
- 1968, Abstract relief, Redmark Gallery, London
- 1972, Mansard Gallery, Heal's, London
- 1972, O'Hana Gallery, London
- 1973, Free Painters and Sculptors, The Mall Galleries, London
- 1973, Sculptures and Reliefs, Drian Galleries, London
- 1973, Ben Uri Gallery, London
- 1974, Free Painters and Sculptors, The Mall Galleries, London
- 1974, The Feminine Eye, Women's International Art Club, Drian Galleries, London
- 1975, FPS Trends 1975: Painting and Sculpture, Free Painters and Sculptors, The Mall Galleries, London
- 1975, Women's International Art Club, Camden Arts Centre, London
- 1976, Women's International Art Club, London

== Galleries and museums ==
Steyn's work is held in the following collections, galleries and museums.

- The Schools Collection, Sheffield, UK
- National Museum, Warsaw, Poland
- National Museum, Gdańsk, Poland
