= Dorothy Bordass =

British artist

Dorothy Bordass (née Foster, 1905 – 1992) was a British artist.

She studied at the Académie Julian in Paris under R T Mumford, and at the Heatherley School of Fine Art under Ian McNab. Bordass painted in St Ives during the later 1950s/early 1960s and took part in many group shows, including the important Metavisual Tachiste Abstract at The Redfern Gallery in 1957 and extensively abroad. Her solo shows include New Vision Centre Gallery, Woodstock Gallery, in the provinces and overseas. In 1958 she participated in the inaugural exhibition of the National Gallery of Malaya, Kuala Lumpa.

Bordass was made a Fellow of the Royal Society of Painters in 1978 and was a Fellow of Free Painters and Sculptors.

== See also ==
- List of St. Ives artists
