= Bunjies =

Former café and music venue in London

Coordinates: 51.5128°N 0.1284°W

Bunjies Coffee House & Folk Cellar was a café situated at 27 Litchfield Street (just off Charing Cross Road), London WC2. Opened in 1953 or 1954, it was one of the original "folk cafés" of the 1950s and 1960s. Below the café, in a 400-year-old wine cellar, was an influential music venue that changed little until its closure (and conversion of the premises into a restaurant) in 1999. Allegedly named after the first owner's pet hamster, the venue featured, early in their careers, Tom Paxton, John Renbourn, Bert Jansch, Bob Dylan and Paul Simon. Al Stewart secured a residency at the Folk Cellar in 1965, at the age of 19, which was a significant factor in his later success.

During the 1960s, the venue was run by two brothers, Leo and Theo Johnson and, at this time, a range of artists more associated with mainstream pop music than folk happily performed to tiny audiences in the confines of the cellar – Phil Collins, Sandie Shaw, Cat Stevens, Art Garfunkel, Rod Stewart, Long John Baldry, Amory Kane, and David Bowie being among them.

In the early 1960s, the Coffee House was owned by Lou Hart, and Wednesday night in the cellar was run by Bob Wilson, an art student at Saint Matin's, and Leonore Drewry. Bob finally returned to Staffordshire and Leonore became the resident folksinger at the Ambiance Restaurant in Bayswater. The club was left in the hands of Bert Jansch, newly down from Edinburgh, and Charles Pearce, an art student at the Central School. During this time, a new generation of singers and musicians would come in and play: Ramblin' Jack Elliott, Derroll Adams, Diz Disley and many others, including composer John Palmer, who played there as a young songwriter in the late 1970s.

Bunjies was also a haunt of many writers, comedians and artists, with Jarvis Cocker of Pulp being among its regulars.

Other London "folk cafés" of the 1950s and 1960s included Les Cousins and The Troubadour.

Anna Singh was one of two original owners of the cafe / coffee house Bunjies. Born on 17 March 1926 (St Patrick's Day), she peacefully died in her sleep at 96 years of age, on 3 June 2025.
