= Aubrey Williams =

Guyanese artist (1926–1990)

- Born: 8 May 1926; Georgetown, Guyana
- Died: 17 April 1990 (aged 63); London, England
- Occupation: Artist (painter)
- Notable work: Shostakovich, The Olmec-Maya and Now, Cosmos
- Movement: Caribbean Artists Movement
- Awards: Commonwealth Prize for Painting (1964), The Golden Arrow of Achievement (1970), The Cacique's Crown of Honour (1986)

Aubrey Williams (8 May 1926 – 27 April 1990) was a Guyanese artist. He was best known for his large, oil-on-canvas paintings, which combine elements of abstract expressionism with forms, images and symbols inspired by the pre-Columbian art of indigenous peoples of the Americas.

Born in Georgetown in British Guiana (now Guyana), Williams began drawing and painting at an early age. He received informal art tutoring from the age of three, and joined the Working People's Art Class at the age of 12. After training to be an agronomist, he worked as an Agricultural Field Officer for eight years, initially on the sugar plantations of the East Coast and later in the North-West region of the country—an area inhabited primarily by the indigenous Warao people. His time among the Warao had a dramatic impact on his artistic approach, and initiated the complex obsession with pre-Columbian arts and cultures that ran throughout his artistic career.

Williams left Guyana at the height of the Independence Movement in 1952, and moved to the United Kingdom. Following his first exhibition in London in 1954, he became an increasingly significant figure in the post-war British avant-garde art scene, particularly through his association with Denis Bowen's New Vision Centre Gallery. In 1966, he came together with a group of London-based Caribbean artists and intellectuals to found the Caribbean Artists Movement, which served as a dynamic hub of cultural events and activity until its dissolution in 1972. From 1970 onwards, Williams worked in studios in Jamaica and Florida as well as the UK, and it was during this period that he produced three of his best-known series of paintings: Shostakovich (1969–1981), The Olmec-Maya and Now (1981–1985) and Cosmos (1989).

== Life ==
=== Early years ===
Aubrey Williams was born on 8 May 1926 in Georgetown in British Guiana, the eldest of seven children. His parents were middle-class Guyanese with mixed African, Carib, and possibly other, ancestry. He was raised in accordance with Christian, English values, and his parents strongly discouraged his childhood interest in populist, African-derived, art forms such as Anancy stories and the masquerade bands (locally known as "Santapee bands") that performed in the streets of Georgetown at Christmas.

Williams' artistic tendencies emerged early on in his youth. When he was three years old, and living on Bourda Street in central Georgetown, he produced an observational sketch of a turkey vulture eating a dead rat in Bourda Cemetery. On seeing the drawing, his father (who was working as a postman at that time) took it to a local Dutch art restorer, named Mr De Wynter, who worked in the churches of British Guiana. De Wynter instantly recognised Williams artistic talent, and decided to offer him informal art training. They worked together for five years. Reflecting on this early art training years later, Williams noted that it was very different from conventional methods of teaching art in the UK: "He [De Wynter] would give me a task to perform, say, ask me to draw some animals or some fruits. He would then take the drawing and see if it was good. He would never correct the drawing. He would instead make another drawing." It was, Williams said, the "best method" he had ever come across, and one that profoundly influenced him in his own career as an art teacher.

Between the ages of 12 and 15, while he was still at school, Williams attended the Working People's Art Class (WPAC) in Georgetown, which was led by the artist E. R. Burrowes. At the age of 15, Williams enrolled on a four-year agricultural apprenticeship scheme that was run in affiliation with University College, London. His training included a special focus on sugar production. He was appointed as an Agricultural Field Officer in 1944.

=== Adult life in British Guiana ===
==== Agricultural Officer on the East Coast ====
In the early years of his employment with the Department of Agriculture in British Guiana, Williams occupied three positions simultaneously: Field Officer, Agricultural Superintendent for the East Coast, and Cane-Farming Officer. He was appointed to the latter position following his efforts to negotiate with the government on behalf of the cane-farmers. As Cane-Farming Officer, he was expected to "smooth out relations" between the owners and managers of the sugar plantations and the workers, without "rocking the boat". Williams, however, had other plans. He worked hard to defend the rights of the cane-farmers, and in doing so was brought into regular confrontation with the plantation managers. Indeed, in his words, he became "a bloody thorn in their side, demanding correct figures, fair play, and that sort of thing". Although this period of his life was a very stressful one, Williams continued painting throughout.

==== The Working People's Art Class ====
Shortly after he qualified as an Agricultural Officer, Williams contacted E. R. Burrowes and returned to the Working People's Art Class, but this time as a teacher and organiser. Together they extended the WPAC beyond central Georgetown by setting up auxiliary classes throughout the East Coast. Williams himself established new classes in the agricultural regions in which he was working, and would often lead classes when Burrowes was unavailable. The classes were held at least twice weekly.

==== Time among the Warao in the North-West ====
After a number of years working on the East Coast, Williams was sent to work among the Warao (or Warrau) people in the North-West of the country (now the Barima-Waini region, or Region 1). He was put in charge of the Agricultural Station in the area. Although he had technically been promoted, Williams initially viewed his redeployment as a form of punishment for his activism on behalf of the sugar-cane farmers. "It was like sending someone to Siberia," he said.

However, Williams' perspective on his time in the North-West region changed dramatically within the first six months. He ultimately stayed in the area for two years, and the interaction he had with Warao people during this period had a profound effect on his artistic development. Listening to the Warao talk about colour and form totally transformed his understanding of art; and his experiences in this region instigated an interest in pre-Columbian culture and artefacts which subsequently became "the core of [his] artistic activity". Indeed, in 1987 Williams reflected: "[I]t was there that for the first time I discovered myself as an artist. Before that it was all amateur activity. [...] I have to thank the Warrau people now for my work as an artist". Williams created many paintings while working in the North-West region, but he destroyed most of his work soon after it was created.

==== Return to Georgetown ====
After two years living with the Warao, Williams returned to Georgetown, where he resumed his work with the Working People's Art Class. The moment of his return, however, was a time of great political upheaval in the city. The Independence Movement in British Guiana was gaining strength, and most of his friends had joined the People's Progressive Party (PPP), which was at the forefront of the struggle. Although Williams was never a member of the PPP, and did not attend any of their meetings, he was close to the party's leader, Cheddi Jagan. This association alone raised suspicion among British colonists, prompting an investigation into Williams' early work for the Department of Agriculture, and he was ultimately accused of having founded "farmer's communes" on the East Coast. Around this time, one of his friends in the PPP – who he would later claim "saved his life" – advised him to leave the country. Three months later, Williams took this advice and departed for the UK.

=== England ===
==== The first few years ====
Williams arrived in England in 1952 at the age of 26. He took up accommodation at Hans Crescent in London – an area that was, according to him, populated by the "colonial elite": "the sons of Maharajas, the upper middle classes" – and enrolled on a course in Agricultural Engineering at the University of Leicester. However, following discouragement from his university lecturers and growing feelings of discomfort with his accommodation (he later described Hans Crescent as part of a form of "British brainwashing and indoctrination" because "after living like [that] for a few months you would begin to despise your own people back home"), he dropped his university course and embarked on a period of travel in Europe and the UK. During his travels he met Albert Camus who, in turn, introduced him to Pablo Picasso. For Williams, the meeting with Picasso was a "big disappointment". On being introduced, the Spanish painter told him that "[he] had a very fine African head" and said that he would like Williams to pose for him. "I felt terrible," Williams recalled. "In spite of the fact that I was introduced to him as an artist, he did not think of me as another artist. He thought of me only as something he could use for his own work."

On returning from his travels in 1954, Williams enrolled as a student at St Martin's School of Art. He studied at St. Martin's for more than two and a half years. In his second year, however, he decided that he wanted to use the school's facilities and resources but did not want their diploma and thus did not register after this time. In 1954 he held his first exhibition at the little-known Archer Gallery in Westbourne Grove in London. During these early years in London, Williams married his partner, Eve Lafargue, who had travelled with him from British Guiana.

==== Recognition: from New Vision to the Commonwealth Prize ====
Sometime in the late 1950s Williams met Denis Bowen—founder of the New Vision Group and director of the New Vision Gallery in London from 1951 to 1966. Though under-recognized at the time, the New Vision Centre Gallery (NVCG) played an important role in the post-war British art scene through its promotion of abstract art and its unusual openness to, and interest in, artists from all around the world. Williams' involvement with the NVCG marked an important turning-point in his career. A number of his paintings were included in the New Vision Open Exhibition in early 1958, and the Gallery put on two solo exhibitions of his work in August 1959 and November 1960. These exhibitions were a great success for Williams: his work received positive reviews from numerous art critics and sold well, and he subsequently obtained further invitations to exhibit in Paris, Milan and Chicago.

At the time of this success, Williams felt that he had "made it" as an artist. However, after two years the interest in his work subsided and his exhibitions started to be ignored. For Williams, this precipitated a five-year period of self-doubt and "confusion".

Another breakthrough in his career came in 1963 when 40 of his paintings were exhibited in the Commonwealth Biennale of Abstract Art at the Commonwealth Institute in London. Williams was awarded the only prize of the exhibition for his painting Roraima (the £50 prize was donated by the British artist Frank Avray Wilson). In 1965 Williams was awarded the Commonwealth Prize for Painting, which was presented by Queen Elizabeth II.

==== The Caribbean Artists Movement ====
In the mid-1960s Williams joined forces with a small group of London-based Caribbean intellectuals and artists to found the Caribbean Artists Movement (CAM). The other founding members of the movement were: Kamau Brathwaite, Wilson Harris, Louis James, Evan Jones, John La Rose, Ronald Moody, Orlando Patterson and Andrew Salkey. Active for six years (from 1966 to 1972), CAM took the form of meetings, readings, exhibitions, seminars and conferences, which sought to provide a forum for Caribbean artists to exchange ideas, address particular artistic issues, and discuss each other's work. It began as a series of small, private meetings held in members' homes but quickly expanded into larger, public events.

Williams was a regular at CAM events and played an important pioneering role in the movement, "which was to have an inestimable influence on the British art scene for the next fifteen years". In April 1967, he held an informal meeting at his studio in which he talked about his work, his creative process, his influences and philosophy. The meeting was attended by Brathwaite, La Rose, Salkey and Harris. At CAM's first Symposium of West Indian Artists, which was held at the West Indian Students' Centre in Earl's Court on 2 June 1967, Williams gave a short speech about themes in Caribbean art. He also attended the first CAM conference in September 1967 at the University of Kent, and presented a paper entitled "The Predicament of the Artist in the Caribbean". In this paper he argued against ideas that art should be figurative or narrative, while also suggesting that Caribbean artists need not turn to contemporary European artists for examples of more abstract or non-narrative forms; they could, instead, find precedents in the "primitive" art of South America and the Caribbean. In May 1960 he contributed a number of paintings to CAM's first art exhibition.

Williams described CAM as "very important" both for himself and for other Caribbean artists. "It helped create an intellectual atmosphere for everyone to be creative and relate to each other", he said, and provided an "international platform" through which individual members "came to know what was happening in the rest of the Commonwealth" and through which he personally met other artists "from Africa, from India and from many parts of the world".

=== Later years: between London, Jamaica, Florida and Guyana ===
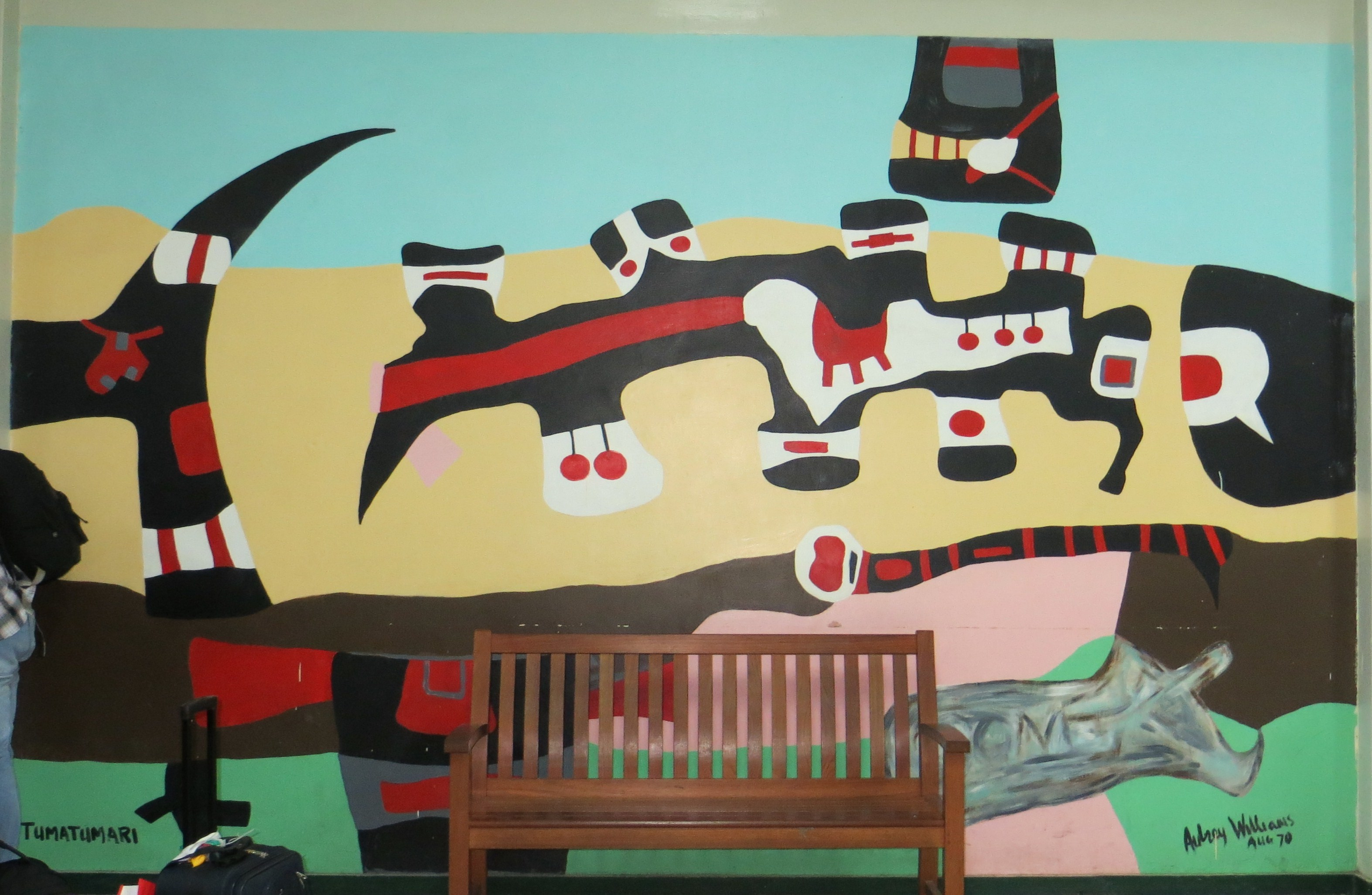
Tumatumari (1970) by Aubrey Williams. This painting is part of the Timehri series of murals at the Cheddi Jagan International Airport.

While Williams maintained a base in London until the end of his life, from 1970 onward he spent large amounts of time working overseas in Jamaica, Florida and, less frequently, Guyana. In February 1970 he travelled to Guyana with a group of CAM artists – including Brathwaite, Harris, Salkey and Sam Selvon – for a Caribbean Writers and Artists Convention that was organised by the Guyanese government as part of the Guyana Republic Celebrations of that year. This was the first time he had returned to Guyana since 1952, and Williams received the national honour of The Golden Arrow of Achievement. In the same year he completed a government-commissioned series of five murals, named Timehri, at the Cheddi Jagan International Airport. 1970 was also the year in which Williams first travelled to Jamaica. After this initial visit, he spent several months in Jamaica every year and was ultimately appointed Artist-in-Residence at the Olympia Art Centre in Kingston.

In 1972, he took part in the first Carifesta in Guyana, which ran from 25 August to 15 September. In 1976, he completed two murals in Jamaica, at the School of Hope for Mentally Handicapped Children and at the African Methodist Episcopal (AME) Church in Swallowfield Road. In 1977 he exhibited work as a participant in the Second World Black and African Festival of Arts and Culture (Festac '77) held in Lagos, Nigeria, from 15 January to 12 February, together with other UK-based Black artists, including Winston Branch, Ronald Moody, Uzo Egonu, Armet Francis, Emmanuel Taiwo Jegede and Donald Locke. In May 1978, Williams completed a mural in Howe Hall at the University of Dalhousie, which was commissioned by the Prime Minister of Guyana at that time, Forbes Burnham.

In the 1980s, Williams worked mainly in a studio in Florida. During these years, he produced three of his best-known series of paintings: Shostakovich, The Olmec-Maya and Now and Cosmos. After his Shostakovich exhibition at London's Commonwealth Institute in 1981 received scant coverage in the national press, Guy Brett wrote in Index on Censorship:

"Aubrey Williams is able, to paint with epic power on a large scale. His paintings are a rare thing — a remarkable homage of one artist to another, and also of one medium to another. I felt his exhibition was a tonic to the whole art scene here, regardless of where one places oneself in the movement of styles and ideas. Yet it passes with virtually no comment in the cultural press. ...Yet he has lived and worked in Britain since 1954! It begins to be clear what Williams means when he describes himself as an 'exile' in this country, and how his situation is linked with the way the cultural establishment here boycotts artists who don't fit in with a traditional image of British art."

In 1986, the Guyanese government awarded him The Cacique's Crown of Honour, and that year he was the subject of a documentary film directed by Imruh Caesar entitled The Mark of the Hand, which was first screened at the British Academy of Film and Television Arts in London on 16 December 1986.

In 1989, paintings by Williams were included in an exhibition at the Hayward Gallery entitled The Other Story, which focused on the work of African and Asian artists in post-World War II Britain. This was the first time that his work was exhibited in a mainstream public art gallery in the UK, and featured his Cosmos series. In the words of Geoffrey MacLean, "It showed the vast span of Williams's spiritual and intellectual development, from the birds of Guyana and the environment of his childhood, through the memory of his Amerindian heritage, culminating in an appreciation of universal expression through music and spiritual realisation through the cosmos."

Williams died in London on 17 April 1990, aged 63, "after a long fight with cancer".

== Legacy ==
The 1990 book by Anne Walmsley entitled Guyana Dreaming: The Art of Aubrey Williams, which the artist saw in manuscript 10 days before his death, was the first significant publication devoted to his work.

On 19 January 1996, a half-day seminar on Aubrey Williams was organised by the Institute of International Visual Art (InIVA) to coincide with a showing of The Cosmos Series at the October Gallery (where the last solo exhibition that took place during his lifetime was held), featuring contributions by Stuart Hall, Anne Walmsley, Rasheed Araeen and Wilson Harris, plus a screening of Imruh Caesar's 1986 documentary on Williams, The Mark of the Hand.

In summer 1998, a major exhibition of work by Williams was mounted at the Whitechapel Art Gallery, and other significant posthumous exhibitions have also taken place, at the October Gallery and elsewhere. A 2025 exhibition titled Aubrey Williams: Elemental Force covered several decades of his work, reappraising his influence.

Work by Williams is also in important collections, including the Arts Council of England, the Fitzwilliam Museum, the Royal Albert Memorial Museum, and the Tate, where there is a room dedicated to his art.

== Style ==
In the early years of his artistic career, from the time he joined the WPAC up until the late 1950s, Williams paintings were primarily figurative. According to Donald Locke, a fellow Guyanese artist who attended the WPAC at the same time as Williams, his paintings during the WPAC were usually of pregnant female nudes, and his colours of choice were typically "pale, whiteish, yellows and browns". When he first moved to London, Williams initially worked with pastels because he could not afford to buy paints. Locke described his work in the mid- to late 1950s as "tinged" with a "Cubistic-Naturalism" that was common to young artists in the WPAC.

While living in London and travelling in Europe in the mid-1950s, Williams was introduced to the most recent trends in European and American art through exhibitions at The Tate in London and elsewhere. He was impressed and excited by an exhibition of German expressionist painting in London, and by the work of American abstract expressionist artists such as Jackson Pollock, Franz Kline, Barnett Newman, Willem de Kooning, Mark Rothko. He found a particular affinity with Arshile Gorky – whose work, he said, "fitted in some way with [his] own perception" – and with Roberto Matta. He traced his affinity with Matta to a shared experience of colonialism: "It's the smell of the presence of the conquistadors. It's the smell of a loss, and a replacement of lesser than what was destroyed". These various influences had a significant impact on his artistic development in subsequent years.

From 1959 onward, Williams' work became increasingly abstract and his style was frequently described by art critics as a form of abstract expressionism. While economic factors had originally limited the size of canvas he used, he gradually progressed onto ever-larger canvases, and from 1970 onward also painted a number of large murals. He used glazes and scumbling to create effects with his oil paints. Following a period of self-questioning in the early 1970s, during which Williams worried that he was "only making paintings [...] like making wall furniture", he began to re-introduce figurative elements into his paintings—a stylistic change that is particularly visible in his The Olmec-Maya and Now series.

== Exhibitions ==
(G = Group shows)

- 1954: Archer Gallery, London, UK (G)
- 1958/59/60: New Vision Centre Gallery, London
- 1958: St Catherine's College, Oxford, UK
- 1960: David Jones' Art Gallery, Melbourne (G)
  - Hessenhuis, Antwerp, Belgium (G)
  - Walkers Gallery, London (G)
  - Woodstock Gallery, London (G)
  - Portal Gallery, London (G)
  - Univision Royal Court Grill, Newcastle-upon-Tyne, UK (G)
  - Grabowski Gallery, London (G)
- 1961: Richmond Hill Gallery, Richmond, UK
  - Galleria Pater, Milan, Italy
  - New Vision Centre Gallery, London (G)
  - Galerie Walcheturm, Zürich, Switzerland (G)
- 1961/62/63/65: Commonwealth Institute Art Gallery, London (G)
- 1962: National College of Art, Dublin, Ireland (G)
- 1963: Grabowski Gallery, London
  - Gallery 60, Colchester, UK
  - Ritchie Hendricks Gallery, Dublin, Ireland
- 1964: Forum Galleries, Bristol, UK
  - Whitworth Art Gallery, Manchester, UK (G)
- 1965: Arts Council, Karachi, Pakistan (G)
  - Arts Centre, University of Sussex, Brighton, UK (G)
  - Commonwealth Arts Festival, Royal Academy of Arts, London (G)
  - University of Glasgow and Commonwealth Arts Festival, Glasgow, Scotland (G)
- 1966–70: Nicholas Treadwell Gallery, London (G)
- 1966: Appointment With Six (also featuring Gwen Barnard, Pip Benveniste, Oswell Blakeston, Max Chapman, and A. Oscar), The Arun Art Centre, Arundel, Sussex, UK (G)
- 1967: Van Mildert College, Durham University, Durham, UK
  - Expo '67, Montreal, Canada (G)
  - São Paulo Biennale (XI), Brazil (G)
  - Brighton Festival of Arts, Sussex (G)
  - Theatre Royal, Stratford, UK (G)
- 1967–68: University of Kent, Canterbury, UK (G)
- 1968: London School of Economics, London (G)
  - City Art Gallery, Bristol, UK (G)
  - West Indian Students Centre, London (G)
  - House of Commons, London (G)
- 1969: Royal Albert Memorial Museum, Exeter, UK
- 1970: John Peartree Gallery, Kingston, Jamaica
  - Guyana Museum, Georgetown, Guyana (G)
- 1971: Camden Arts Centre, London, UK
- 1971/73/74:Commonwealth Institute Art Gallery, London, UK (G)
- 1972: Illinois Centre, Chicago, USA
  - Critchlow Labour College, Carifesta '72, Georgetown, Guyana
- 1973: Nicholas Treadwell Gallery, London
- 1973/74: Little Gallery, Kingston, Jamaica
- 1974: The Warehouse, Kingston, Jamaica
- 1975–76: Olympia International Arts Centre, Jamaica (G)
- 1975–77: Gallery Barrington, Kingston, Jamaica
- 1977: Festac – Festival of the Arts, Lagos, Nigeria (G)
  - Jamaica House, Kingston, Jamaica (G)
- 1977–81: Shostakovich, Commonwealth Institute, London
- 1982–84: Westbourne Gallery, London (G)
- 1984: October Gallery, London, UK
  - Paintings on the music of Dmitri Shostakovich, Royal Festival Hall, London
- 1985: The Olmec-Maya & Now, Commonwealth Institute Art Gallery, London
  - Goldsmiths College Gallery, London
  - Cosmos, Gallery Barrington, Kingston, Jamaica
  - GLC Brixton Recreation Centre, London (G)
  - Contemporary Arts Centre, Kingston, Jamaica
- 1986: Camden Arts Centre, London (G)
  - Leicester Museum & Art Gallery (G)
- 1986/87/88: October Gallery, London
- 1987: National Gallery (touring exhibition), Guyana
  - National Gallery (touring exhibition), Guyana
- 1988: Contemporary Arts Centre, Kingston, Jamaica
  - Shibuya Tokyo Plaza, Tokyo, Japan
- 1989–90:The Other Story: Afro-Asian Artists in Post-war Britain – Hayward Gallery, London (G)
- 1989: De Graaf Fine Art, Chicago USA
  - Aubrey Williams: Selected Oils and Recent Acrylics, October Gallery, London, UK
- 1990: Aubrey Williams Celebration, Commonwealth Institute, London
  - A Tribute to Aubrey Williams, Guyana Museum, Georgetown, Guyana
  - A Tribute to Aubrey Williams, Contemporary Art Centre, Kingston, Jamaica
- 1992: Endangered Birds, Sotheran's Antiquarian Books, London
  - Belgrave Gallery, London, UK (G)
- 1995–96:Cosmos Series, October Gallery, London
- 1995: Islington Arts Factory, London, UK (G)
- 1996: Castellani House, Georgetown, Guyana
- 1996–97:Transforming the Crown, Harlem & Caribbean Cultural Center, New York City (G)
- 1998: Aubrey Williams: Cosmos Paintings, Whitechapel Art Gallery, London
- 2002: October Gallery, London
- 2004: October Gallery, London
- 2006: Aubrey Williams: Major Works, October Gallery, London
- 2007: Goodison Room, Tate Britain, London
- 2008: Rotunda Space, University of Birmingham, Birmingham, UK
- 2010: Atlantic Fire – Walker Art Gallery, Liverpool, UK
  - Now and Coming Time, October Gallery, London
- 2013: Shostakovich: Symphonies and Quartets, Hales Gallery, London
- 2015: Realm of the Sun, October Gallery, London
- 2015–16: No Colour Bar: Black British Art in Action 1960–1990, Guildhall Art Gallery, London (G)
- 2018: Aubrey Williams, October Gallery, London
- 2022: Aubrey Williams: Sunphase – Works on Paper, October Gallery, London
  - Aubrey Williams: Future Conscious, October Gallery, London
- 2025: Aubrey Williams: Elemental Force, October Gallery, London

== Awards ==
- 1963: Prize at the Commonwealth Biennale of Abstract Art in London
- 1965: Commonwealth Prize for Painting
- 1970: The Golden Arrow of Achievement, Guyana
- 1986: The Cacique's Crown of Honour, Guyana

== See also ==
- Culture of Guyana
