= Violet Fuller =

British artist (1920-2006)

- Born: 26 July 1920; Tottenham, London
- Died: 2006 (aged 85–86)
- Education: Hornsey School of Art; Stroud School of Art
- Known for: Artist, painter

Violet Fuller (26 July 1920 – 2006) was a British artist who painted in oils and watercolours and was a prolific exhibitor.

== Biography ==
Born in Tottenham in north London, Fuller attended the Hornsey School of Art from 1937 to 1940 and then the Stroud School of Art from 1942 to 1944. Beginning in 1958, Fuller had a series of solo exhibitions at the Woodstock Gallery in London, with subsequent shows in 1961, 1963 and 1967. Other solo exhibitions of her work were held at the Loggia Gallery and the Old Bakehouse Gallery in Sevenoaks. Fuller was a regular exhibitor in group shows at the Royal Academy in London, with the Royal Society of British Artists, the New English Art Club, the Women's International Art Club and the Royal Institute of Painters in Watercolours. She was a founding member, and later, a Fellow of the Society of Free Painters and Sculptors. London street scenes regularly featured in her paintings and both the London Boroughs of Enfield and Haringey hold examples.
