= Sidney Hunt =

Sidney Hunt (1896–1940) was a British draughtsman, painter, poet and editor who published the avant-garde journal Ray between 1926 and 1927.

== Life ==
Sidney James Hunt was born in 1896 and studied at the Slade School of Fine Art in London. During the 1920s he designed bookplates and contributed modern-style drawings for several international art magazines, such as Artwork, Der Querschnitt, Der Sturm, Tambour and Contimporanul. Hunt also published experimental poems in modern journals, such as Transition, Seed, and Blues: A Magazine of New Rhythms. In October 1925, he held his first solo exhibition at the Mayor Gallery in London. Between 1926 and 1932, he was a member of the Seven and Five Society, one of the most progressive art societies in interwar England. In 1926 and 1927, Hunt edited the avant-garde magazine Ray, which has been described as the English equivalent of influential art journals from the 1920s such as Merz, Mecano and De Stijl. Ray featured work of leading figures of the European avant-garde such as Kurt Schwitters, El Lissitzky, Theo van Doesburg, Naum Gabo and Hans Arp. It has been said that Hunt died in his studio in 1940, aged forty-four, during The Blitz.

== Style ==
Much of Hunt's work is homoerotic; he had homosexual patrons like Sir Edward Marsh; Alfred Flechtheim reproduced his Ganymede in Der Querschnitt (1921, VIII, p. 346); his drawings of boys appeared with those of Ralph Chubb in The Island in 1931; the bookplates he produced feature naked youths; and Oswell Blakeston published his experimental prose poem fantasies of 18-year-old hermaphrodites in the first, 1933 issue of Seed (p. 7). His themes included boys bathing, sunbathing, posing with pansies and possibly boy prostitutes on a "Saturday afternoon" in Artwork (1924, I, p. 75). He is one of the few modernist artists to use abstraction to express the essentials of male beauty in simplified forms like his painting of "Ganymede" or by contrasts of black and white as in "Drawing" (1922). As Candela has speculated, he may also be the creator of the photomontages that he published in Ray (pp. 2, 15 and 27), as by the otherwise unknown P. Capeli. His work as a pioneer of British modernism and as an abstract gay artist deserves much more reassessment.
