= Ray (art magazine) =

British little magazine

Ray was a British short-run little avant-garde art magazine, designed, edited, and financed by the English artist and designer Sidney Hunt from its start in 1926 to its demise in 1927. The magazine was described as the English equivalent of other influential art journals from the 1920s such as Merz, Mecano and De Stijl. The headquarters of Ray was in London. Ray featured work of leading figures of the European avant-garde such as Kurt Schwitters, El Lissitzky, Theo van Doesburg, Naum Gabo, and Hans Arp. Although only two issues were printed, the existence of Ray establishes a line of continuity between the Vorticist movement of the 1910s and Unit One's renaissance of British art in the 1930s. From this perspective, Ray should be considered the missing link between the 1914-15 publication of the Vorticist journal BLAST and the edition of the abstract and constructivist English magazines Axis (1935–1937) and Circle (1937).
