= Ian Hall (musician) =

Guyanese-born British musician (1940–2022)

Professor Ian Hall
- Born: Ian Desmond Gosford Hall; 18 January 1940; Georgetown, Guyana
- Died: 11 May 2022 (aged 82); Hammersmith, London, England
- Education: Archbishop Tenison's Grammar School; Keble College, Oxford ((B.A., 1962; M.A., 1966); London University (PhD)
- Occupations: Musician, composer, organist, educator
- Known for: Founder of the Bloomsbury International Society
- Relatives: Rudolph Dunbar (uncle)

Ian Desmond Gosford Hall (18 January 1940 – 11 May 2022) was a Guyanese-born British musician, composer, organist and educator. Also a human rights activist, Hall was quoted in 2003 as saying: "My real thing in life has been promoting racial harmony through the arts." He was founder of the Bloomsbury International Society, through which he orchestrated musical performances "merging Western instruments with sounds from the Caribbean, Asia and Africa."

Hall is considered to have been the first black graduate of Oxford University's music school.

== Early life and education ==
Ian Desmond Gosford Hall was born in Georgetown, Guyana, on 18 January 1940. His mother died when he was six years old, after which he was raised by his grandmother. His father had been the first black officer to join the Royal Air Force during World War II, then going to study dentistry at Guy's Hospital in London, and in 1952 Hall moved to Britain to join him. Hall won a scholarship to attend Archbishop Tenison's Grammar School, where he was one of the first black pupils. During a summer holiday when he was 14 years old, in response to a music teacher's challenge that he needed to make more effort, Hall taught himself classical piano, practising day and night until, as he recalled in a 2003 interview: "I was playing the preludes and fugues of Johann Sebastian Bach."

== Career ==
Hall studied at Keble College, Oxford, graduating with highest honours (B.A. in 1962, M.A. in 1966). While at Keble, "he not only picked up a penetrating Oxford accent but also represented the university as a sprinter and played cricket for the Authentics." He subsequently became an Associate of the Royal College of Organists, was assistant organist at St-Martin-in-the-Fields, sang at Southwark Cathedral, and from 1964 to 1966 was a member of the Sunday Evening Choir at St Paul's Cathedral. He would also obtain a PhD in ethnomusicology at the University of London. In 1966, he went to Ghana, where he was director of music at Achimota School. After returning, he took up the appointment of Organist and Director of Music at the Church of Christ the King, Bloomsbury, and after seven years went to the Church of St. Michael's in Chester Square, Belgravia.

Drawing inspiration from the civil rights movement, Hall conceived and founded in 1972 the Bloomsbury International Society to promote racial harmony particularly through music; intercultural performances he orchestrated brought together instruments and musical traditions from the Caribbean, Asia and Africa, as well as from Europe and North America. As described by Moni Basu in the Atlanta Journal-Constitution: "Sitar met violin. Westminster Abbey resounded with the twang of the Ebony Steel Band. And the Commonwealth Institute marked its golden jubilee with Queen Elizabeth II in the audience and the thumping of Ashanti drums accompanying baroque brass on stage."

For Festac 77, the Second World Black and African Festival of Arts and Culture, held in Lagos, Nigeria, Hall was Chairman of the UK Committee, participating alongside other eminent professors of music such as Akin Euba, J. H. Kwabena Nketia and Eileen Southern.

Over the years, his talents as a composer and musician enabled Hall to perform internationally at many prominent venues and events and to connect with a wide range of high-profile personalities, including the British royal family, Benjamin Britten, Peter Pears, Nelson Mandela and the Rev. Al Sharpton. Hall has been characterised as "a distinguished rarity", with a taste in music that "ranges from obscure renaissance and baroque to Afro-jazz and Caribbean rhythms. It is said of him that while there may be those who are gifted instrumentalists, vocalists and composers, and yet others with an aptitude for devising and directing musical and dramatic entertainments, to find a single person endowed with all these qualities must be exceedingly rare."

== Human rights work ==
In 1982, Hall was appointed Special Consultant to the United Nations Center Against Apartheid, and in 2000 he was asked by Kofi Annan to be Ambassador-at-Large of a network of charitable organizations called the World Association of Non-Governmental Organizations (WANGO).

== Personal life and death ==
Hall's uncle was conductor Rudolph Dunbar.

In 2019, Hall was diagnosed with kidney failure. He died at Charing Cross Hospital in Hammersmith, London, on 11 May 2022, at the age of 82.
