= Robin Guthrie (artist) =

British artist (1902–1971)

- Born: 15 June 1902; Harting, Sussex
- Died: 27 January 1971 (aged 68)
- Education: Slade School of Fine Art
- Known for: Painting
- Spouses: Kathleen Guthrie (m. 1927–1937, divorced); Deborah Dering

Robin Craig Guthrie (15 June 1902 – 27 January 1971) was a British artist. He painted portraits, landscapes and murals and was also a draughtsman and book illustrator.

== Biography ==
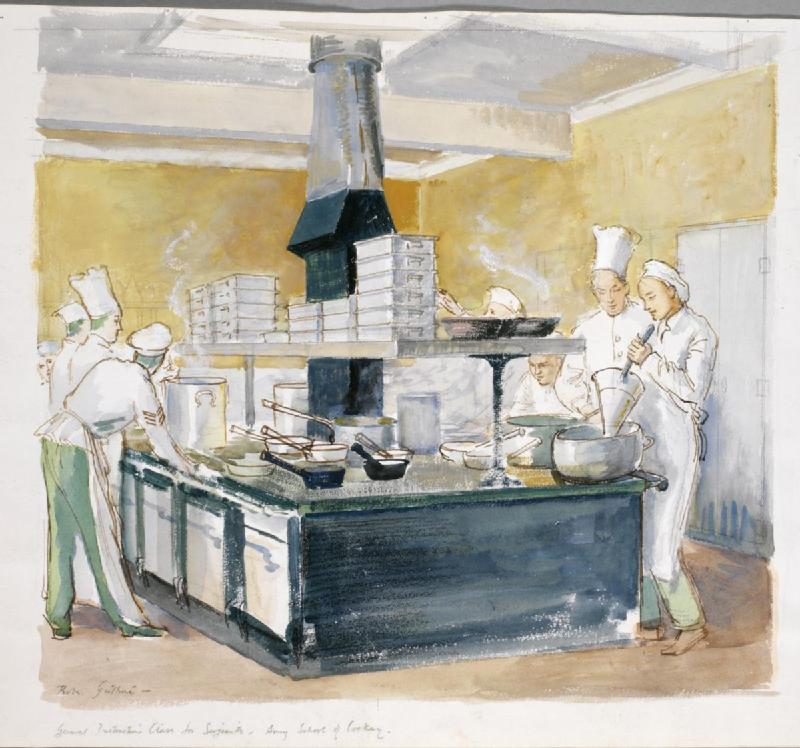
General Instruction Class for Sergeants – Army School of Cookery, Aldershot (Art.IWM ART LD1163)

Guthrie was born in Harting to the artist James Joshua Guthrie (1874–1952) who was the founder of the Pear Tree Press. Robin Guthrie attended the Slade School of Art between 1918 and 1922. At the Slade, he won a number of prizes including the 1920 composition prize for his painting Pastoral Scene with Figures. On leaving the Slade, Guthrie took a studio with his fellow Slade student Rodney Joseph Burn in Hampstead. There Guthrie painted the Sermon on the Mount which is now in the Tate. In the painting the Christ figure is believed to be a self-portrait of Guthrie, while other figures include his friend, Thomas Monnington. At the same Hampstead studio in Parkhill Road, Guthrie painted a second large religious canvas, Christ Healing the Sick, which he exhibited at the New English Art Club in 1929. Guthrie’s smaller gouache model for this is also known.

Guthrie began exhibiting with the New English Art Club in 1922 and became a full member of the group in 1928. In 1926 he had a group exhibition at the Goupil Gallery, sharing the space with Stephen Bone and with Rodney Burn, and in 1931 he exhibited at the Royal Academy for the first time. In 1927, he married the artist Kathleen Guthrie and the couple moved to America in 1931 when he became a director of the School of the Museum of Fine Arts, Boston, alongside Burn. In 1933 the Guthrie's returned to England and settled in Sussex but divorced in 1937. Guthrie later married Deborah Dering.

During World War II, Guthrie was given a short-term commission by the War Artists' Advisory Committee to record the work of the Army cookery school and activities at Auxiliary Territorial Service training bases. After the War, Guthrie worked as an instructor at the Royal College of Art between 1950 and 1952 and also at the City and Guilds of London Art School and at St Martins School of Art. Guthrie illustrated a number of books, including All the Way to Alfriston by Eleanor Farjeon and A Wild Garden by James Guthrie, his father.
