= Desmond Zwemmer =

British publisher and bookseller

- Born: 6 December 1919; Herne Hill, England
- Died: 8 September 2000 (aged 80); Bristol, England
- Occupation: Publisher
- Known for: A. Zwemmer Ltd. and Studies in Architecture

Desmond Zwemmer (6 December 1919 – 8 September 2000) was a British publisher and bookseller. For many years he ran the publishing firm A. Zwemmer Ltd. which published award-winning "books about specialised areas of the arts". He also worked with the London-based arts bookshop, A. Zwemmer (commonly referred to as "Zwemmer's"), which has been variously praised by Sir Kenneth Clark who called it a "source of refreshment", by Henry Moore and by Alfred H. Barr Jr.

== Early life and career ==
Zwemmer was born Desmond Anton Zwemmer in 1919 in Herne Hill, south London. His father, Anton, a Dutchman, had settled in England in 1914 and become an art bookseller, art dealer and publisher "of notable prominence", opening Zwemmer's art bookshop on the corner of Charing Cross Road and Litchfield Street London which "revolutionised the London art world" as did, nearby, the Zwemmer Gallery that offered the British public their "first opportunity to purchase the works of Picasso and ... Dalí".

Desmond Zwemmer went to school in the London area and while still a schoolboy he began to help in his father's bookshop and in 1936 he manned the Zwemmer's bookstall at the International Surrealist Exhibition in London.

In those years he would visit European countries to view architecture, always with "the relevant volumes of Pevsner" in hand.

With much of the art book trade based in Paris, a fluent knowledge of French was essential for publishers and booksellers of art books and so he attended the University of Besançon for a year, after which he returned to London and studied art history at the Courtauld Institute under Anthony Blunt.

During World War II he was called up and was posted as an army officer to the North-West Frontier Province, the Lebanon and post-war Germany.

== Publishing ==
In 1946 Desmond visited Paris with his father Anton where he met his father's "publishing and artistic friends", including Picasso.

Anton sent him to Geneva where he spent three months learning about publishing from the Swiss art book publisher Albert Skira. Back in London, he would attend antiquarian book sales and in 1956 enrolled for a three-year course in book and magazine production at the London College of Printing.

Desmond undertook an increasing role in his father's publishing activities (under the imprint of "A. Zwemmer Ltd.") while his younger brother John concentrated on the new and antiquarian bookselling side of their father's business.

Desmond arranged co-editions of art books with European publishers (especially French, Swiss and German), such as Skira, Ernst Wasmuth and Fernand Hazan. He developed the firm's as a wholesale distributor of books, both at home and abroad, and promoted the then novel strategy of remainder sales of art books to the trade.

He vigorously developed the publishing program of books on art, architecture, film, and related subjects. Discovering a market gap for a series of profusely illustrated scholarly books on architecture, in 1957 he launched the Studies in Architecture series, with Anthony Blunt and Rudolf Wittkower as the founding editors. This series was nominated by several critics as his "finest publishing achievement".

Zwemmer insisted that his books' scholarly content was matched by the "highest standards of typography, illustration, printing and binding" and by careful editing, all of which he closely supervised. Since publishing specialist books of such quality would rarely generate sufficient sales to cover costs, Desmond, his brother John and their father agreed that profits from the retail section of the business would be used to subsidise the publishing section.

In 1976 the firm acquired Lund Humphries, another art books publisher with whom A. Zwemmer Ltd. had long been associated. In 1985 after Desmond suffered a stroke, both brothers decided to sell the whole business to Philip Wilson, a company which specialised in fine arts, and to retire.

== Personal life ==
Desmond Zwemmer was a striking figure and had once been described as "six feet-four tall, wearing a widebrimmed black hat and dark overcoat well below the knees" who could have been mistaken for a "descendant of a prosperous Rembrandt merchant".

He married Viera Aquino in 1952. The marriage was dissolved. In 1979 he married Ann Porter (née Beedell), a former social worker who ran a bookshop in Bristol.

He died in Bristol in 2000.
