= Nabaclis =

Village in Demerara-Mahaica, Guyana

Nabaclis Nabacalis
- Village
- Location within Guyana
- Coordinates: 6.75187°N 57.978158°W
- Country: Guyana
- Region: Demerara-Mahaica

Population (2012)
  - Total: 1,527
- Time zone: UTC−04:00

Nabaclis also Nabacalis is a community on the East Coast of Demerara, in the Demerara-Mahaica region. It is in low-lying country by the coast, which is subject to flooding in the rainy season.

The local tradition for the name of the village claims that residents opposed the list of potential names to honor colonial-era leaders. In distaste, residents choose to encourage each other to “nah back d list".

The main economic activities of the village are small businesses and farming, and many households rely on remittances.

The community is served by the Dr. CC Nicholson Hospital, but as of 2012 it was not staffed with doctors around the clock. The hospital was established as a medical center in 1994 with funds from the London-based Cyril Charles Nicholson Foundation, and the government began to upgrade it in 2003 to give residents of Nabaclis and nearby communities an alternative to going into Georgetown for treatment.

The artist Emerson Samuels was born and brought up here, studying at the Golden Grove Methodist School. Also born here are conductor Rudolph Dunbar and Robert Gibson, the grandson of J.C. Gibson.
