= Emerson Samuels =

Guyanese graphic artist (1928–2003)

- Born: Emerson Augustus Samuels; 22 August 1928; Nabacalis, British Guyana
- Died: 6 August 2003 (aged 74); Brooklyn, New York City, U.S.
- Education: Golden Grove Methodist School; Working People's Art Class
- Occupation: Graphic artist

Emerson Augustus Samuels (22 August 1928 – 6 August 2003) was a prominent Guyanese graphic artist. He is perhaps best known for his portrait of Guyana President Forbes Burnham, completed in August 1984, which hangs in the Parliament Chamber.

== Biography ==
Emerson Samuels was born on 22 January 1928 in Nabacalis on the East Coast of Demerara, where he spent his childhood. He studied at the Golden Grove Methodist School, where one of his masters recognised his talent and helped him with drawing. When aged about 15, he travelled to Georgetown with a portfolio of his drawings to apply for work with the British Guiana Lithographic Company, and was hired as an apprentice. Here he learned the skills of offset printing and lithography, and learned technique from other artists with whom he worked. Around 1949, he joined the Guianese Art Group. Later he studied under Edward Rupert Burrowes at the Working People's Art Class (WPAC). In 1951, he won the WPAC's "Picture of the Year" award with his painting The Workers, which shows men at work on the new Lithographic Company building.

Samuels left the Lithographic Company in 1961, and obtained a position with the Ministry of Agriculture, where he illustrated various publications for farmers. He was seconded to the Ministry of Information, where he continued to work as an illustrator, then in 1973 joined the Ministry of Education. He worked with the Ministry of Education for more than 25 years. He designed several commemorative stamps for the Guyana Post Office, including one showing Clive Lloyd, Guyana and West Indies cricket captain, one of Cuffy, the hero of the 1763 Guyanese slave revolt, and one to celebrate 100 years of teaching in Guyana. He illustrated many books for use in schools. He also taught part-time at the Burrowes School of Art until 1999.

Samuels continued to create paintings, including the Metamorphosis series in the late 1970s, always experimenting with different styles. Although his work was displayed in several group exhibitions, he never held a solo exhibition. The National Collection holds several of his works, including Self-portrait (1959), Untitled Abstract (1966), and Industrial Image and Forward Thrust, which won at the National Exhibitions of 1978 and 1982. His portrait of E. R. Burrowes hangs at the Burrowes School of Art. In 1997, the Guyana government gave Samuels the Golden Arrowhead of Achievement for his contributions to art. In 2003, he was Curriculum Artist Illustrator at the National Centre for Educational Research and Development (NCERD).

While on vacation in New York, Emerson Samuels died at the Brookdale Medical Center in Brooklyn from a massive heart attack on 6 August 2003.
