= Kathleen Guthrie =

British artist (1905-1981)

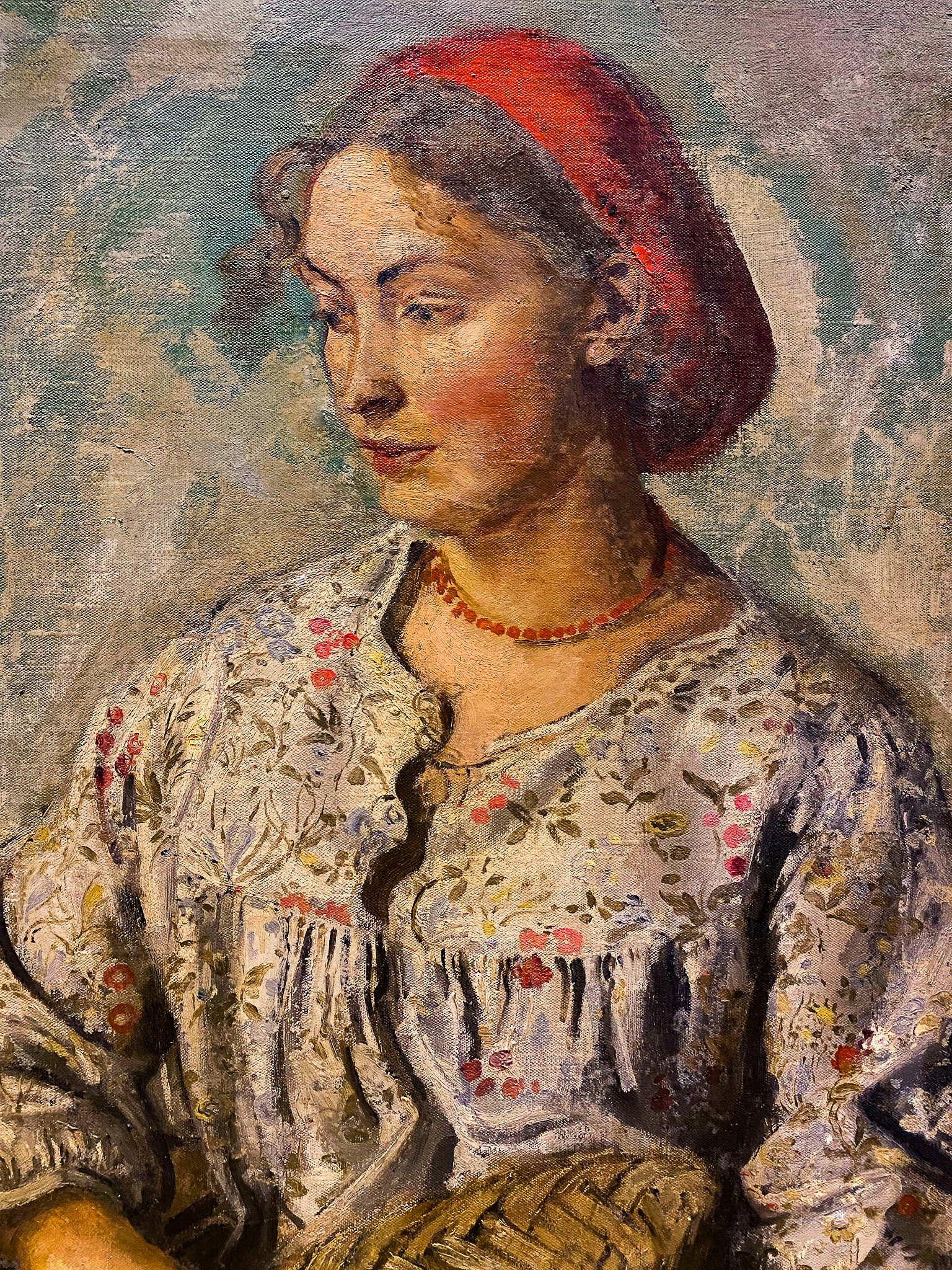
- Portrait by Robin Guthrie
- Born: Kathleen Maltby; 26 February 1905; Feltham, Middlesex
- Died: 7 September 1981 (aged 76)
- Education: Slade School of Fine Art; Royal Academy Schools
- Known for: Painting

Kathleen Guthrie (née Maltby) (26 February 1905 – 7 September 1981) was a British artist who exhibited with the London Group and at the Royal Academy and also had several solo exhibitions. During a long career Guthrie painted in oils, watercolours and acrylics. She also produced silkscreens and murals and wrote and illustrated children's books.

== Biography ==
Guthrie was born in Feltham in Middlesex, the youngest child of Dr Ernest Maltby and Emily Worsfold. Her father's family were lawyers, architects and land agents from Mansfield, Nottinghamshire. She had one sibling, her elder sister Phyllis.

The family moved to Brighton, where Kathleen found life with her old-fashioned parents difficult and suffocating. When she was 17, with support from her maternal aunt, society portrait painter Maud Worsfold, Kathleen persuaded her father to allow her to enroll at the Slade School of Art. She was a student there between 1921 and 1923, where she studied under Henry Tonks, before attending the Royal Academy Schools for three years. In 1927 she married the artist Robin Guthrie and moved to America with him in 1931 when he became a director of the Boston School of Fine Art. In 1932, while in Boston, Kathleen Guthrie had the first solo exhibition of her career with works shown at the Grace Horne Gallery in that city.

The following year the Guthries returned to England and settled in Sussex but divorced in 1937. Kathleen continued to sign her pictures with her married name, because it was known to art dealers and patrons.

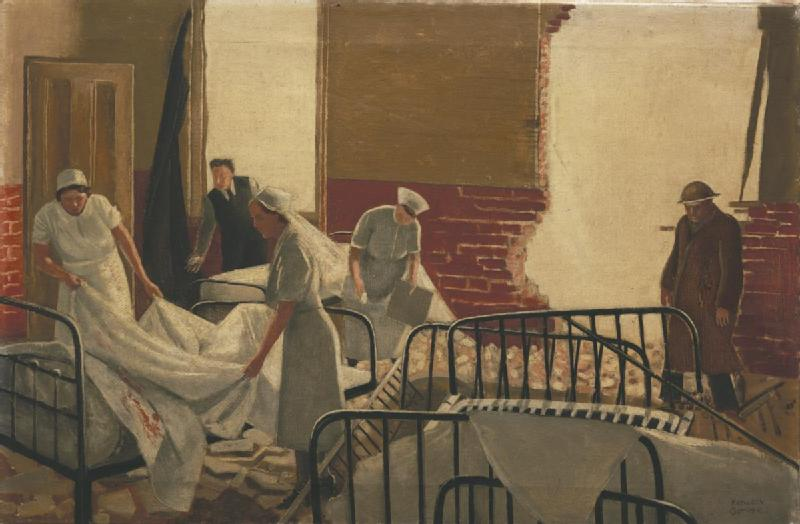
A Bombed Hospital Ward (Art.IWM ART LD944)

During World War II, Guthrie submitted several works to the War Artists' Advisory Committee, which acquired one of the paintings she produced during the conflict, that of a bombed hospital ward. The painting shows the scene in a hospital ward after it has been hit by a bomb that has left a large hole in a wall and mangled beds. The expressions on the faces of the attending staff, and the blood stained sheets, suggest dead or severely injured patients lying on the floor out of sight of the viewer.

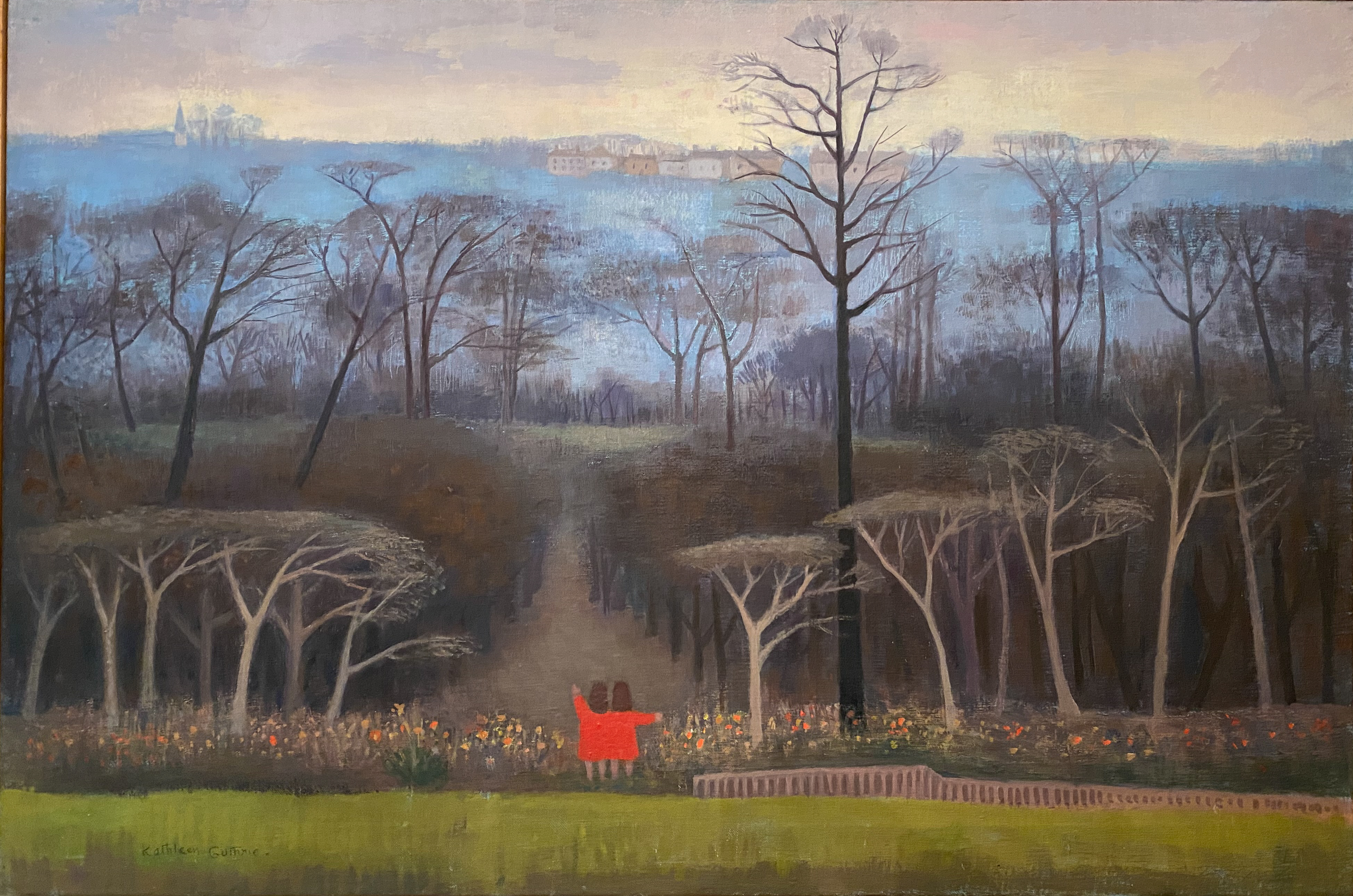
Looking at Highgate, by Kathleen Guthrie

Guthrie married the abstract artist Cecil Stephenson in 1941 and the couple settled in Hampstead, where Guthrie completed a mural for a local health centre. She also continued to exhibit on a regular basis, with her work appearing in a dozen one-woman shows between 1932 and 1977. She exhibited with the London Group and at the Royal Academy and held her first solo exhibition in Britain at the Little Gallery in 1947. Her 1951 exhibition at the Crane Kalman gallery in Manchester was well reviewed and considered a great success.

Guthrie also wrote and illustrated children's books, most notably with her first published book, The Magic Button which was published in 1958. A subsequent volume, Magic Button to the Moon also contained short poems by Guthrie. After Stephenson's death in 1965, Guthrie reproduced, as silk screens, three of his signature Abstracts designs from 1936, 1937 and 1938. During the 1960s Guthrie produced a further series of abstract silk screens, which she titled Camelot, that featured combinations of fields of pure colour.

Guthrie experimented with different styles of painting during her career. These included the traditionalism of her first husband and the abstraction in which her second husband specialised. In her later years she settled on a simplified style which owed little to either of them. These pictures typically showed figures in landscapes, often with undercurrents of humour or menace. The Art Review, described Guthrie's 1966 one-woman show at the Drian Gallery as comprising "delightful paintings of deliberately simplified and stylised figures. She invests them with the charm of Ardizzone
