= Sheena Rose =

Caribbean artist

- Born: 1985 (age 40–41)
- Education: University of North Carolina, Greensboro
- Known for: Animation, drawing, painting, performance art, new media
- Website: www.sheenaroseart.com

Sheena Rose (born 1985) is a contemporary Caribbean multidisciplinary artist who lives and works in Barbados.

She is a Fulbright scholar and holds a BFA Honors degree from Barbados Community College, 2008, as well as an MFA from the University of North Carolina at Greensboro, 2016.

== Biography ==
Starting at age 6, Rose drew comic books, which her fellow students would line up to read. Throughout her younger years in Barbados, art proved an important source of solace and belonging. In particular, while attending an all-girls' high school where the students were told "not to laugh too loudly" and to be "decent," "she started using her drawings to figure out what this all meant and where she would fit into the scheme of things." A college trip from Barbados to New York City, led by her professor Allison Thompson, proved a formative experience in her artistic development. Prior to undertaking her MFA, work she had completed during her BA attracted the attention of the curator David Bailey, who commissioned her to do a site-specific work called Town, an animated exploration of everyday life in Barbados. Artist Christopher Cozier subsequently invited her to do a residency at Alice Yard, an arts initiative in Trinidad and Tobago.

== Career ==
Rose has been a participant in the Havana Biennial, Venice Biennial, Gwangju Bienniale, Jamaica Biennial. In addition, she has exhibited her work in the MoCADA, Queens Museum, KMAC Museum, Turner Contemporary Gallery, and Residency Gallery.

In 2019, her work was included in the Perez Art Museum Miami. The Weatherspoon Art Museum commissioned a mural from Rose, entitled Pause and Breathe, We Got This, for their first-floor atrium space in 2021.

Rose has participated in many public art projects, such as designing bus shelters in Des Moines, Iowa, and completing a two story mural at the Inter-American Development Bank in Washington, D.C., which also includes three of her paintings in its collection. Rose performed her piece Island and Monster at the Royal Academy of Arts, London and MoCADA, NYC in 2017.

In a 2017 profile featured in The New York Times, Rose mentioned Ebony G. Patterson, Christopher Cozier, and Richard Mark Rawlins among her sources of inspiration within the artistic community in the Caribbean.

Emma Watson listed Sheena Rose as one of her favorite artists in a 2018 Vogue article. Rose received the 2020–2021 Distinguished Alumni Award from UNC Greensboro's College of Visual and Performing Arts.

== Awards ==
Her internationally acclaimed work has been recognized through:

- Award for Culture, Barbados, nominated by Barbados Prime Minister Mia Amor Mottley, 2022
- Recipient of the Greensboro School of Art Distinguished Alumni award, October 2020
- Funded by the National Cultural Foundation for a solo show located in Barbados, September 2020
- Fulbright Scholarship recipient in 2014
- Barbados Arts and Sports Funds, May 2012
- The Prince Claus Foundation, June 2011
- Funded to participate in an artist's residency at Tembe Art Studio located in Moengo, Suriname.
- The Sixth Carmichael Prize Award, December 2011
- Lesley's Legacy Foundation grant, December 2010
- Triangle Art Trusts travel grant, Triangle Art Trust, May 2010
- Recipient of the Triangle Art Trust to participate in an artist's residency in Cape Town, South Africa
