= Edward Rupert Burrowes =

Guyanese artist and teacher (1903–1966)

Edward Rupert Burrowes MBE
- Born: 15 September 1903; Barbados
- Died: 1966 (aged 62–63)
- Occupations: Artist and art teacher
- Known for: Founder of Working People's Art Class

Edward Rupert Burrowes MBE (15 September 1903 – 1966) was a Guyanese artist and art teacher who founded the Working People's Art Class (WPAC), the first established art institution in Guyana. The E. R. Burrowes School of Art, an undergraduate institution accredited by the University of Guyana, is named after him.

== Early years ==
Burrowes was born in Barbados in 1903, of African origin. He arrived in Guyana as a young child. His father worked for the privately owned Daily Chronicle. After his father's death, the family had little money to live on. When Burrowes left primary school he became a tailor's apprentice. He continued to study from books, and passed examinations in English Language and Literature, English History, and Scripture. He passed the City and Guilds examinations at an unusually young age, and was able to open his own tailoring shop.

== Artist and teacher ==
Burrowes was interested in art from an early age, and had natural talent. Unable to afford to buy paints, he worked out how to make them using tailor's chalk. He was a frequent visitor to the Georgetown Museum, and was fascinated by the Indian artefacts and displays of Guyanese geology that he saw there. The British Guiana Arts and Crafts Society (BGACS) was formed in 1932, and Burrowes became a member. The established BGACS members were impressed by the talent he displayed in his landscape and genre paintings. The latter depicted working-class people in everyday scenes.

Burrowes began teaching Working Peoples' Art Class (WPAC), which influenced artists such as Dr Denis Williams. His goal was to give ordinary working people an opportunity to develop their artistic talents. Burrowes founded the WPAC in 1948. In 1949, he received a British Council scholarship which let him attend the Brighton College of Art, where he specialised in block printing. When he returned after a year, he was appointed Art teacher at the Government Teachers' Training College. In the 1954 New Year Honours, Burrowes was appointed a Member of the Civil Division of the Order of the British Empire for services to art in British Guiana. In 1956, he was teaching Art and Art History at Queen's College.

Burrowes died aged 63 in 1966.

== Achievements ==
In 1947, Donald Locke attended a class taught in Georgetown by Burrowes, which inspired him to take up painting. Writing about Burrowes in the 1966, Guyana Independence Issue of New World, Locke describes how Burrowes was constantly engaged in "technical exploration", including making his own paints from unlikely ingredients and conducting experiments "with balata, buckram, tailor's canvas, rice bags, bitumen, concrete and ... clay mixed with molasses." Denis Williams called him "the Barbadian who fathered the plastic arts in Guyana in terms of a European ancestry".

The WPAC helped a number of Guyanese artists at the start of their career. Stanley Greaves attended the WPAC with Locke as a teenager and later became well known. Emerson Samuels was another artist who studied at the WPAC. The painter Aubrey Williams studied with E. R. Burrowes in the Working People's Art Class after returning from a two-year term with the Agriculture department in which he had lived with indigenous people in the jungle. In 1987, Williams described Burrowes as "a genius" who "opened the Guyanese eyes to art, in its aesthetic sense".
