= Shostakovich (paintings) =

Series of paintings by Aubrey Williams

- Shostakovitch 3rd Symphony Opus 20
- Artist: Aubrey Williams
- Year: 1969–1981
- Medium: Oil on canvas
- Subject: The quartets and symphonies of Dmitri Shostakovich

Shostakovich is a series of thirty oil-on-canvas paintings by the Guyanese artist Aubrey Williams, created between 1969 and 1981. Each painting in the series is based on a particular symphony or quartet by the Russian composer Dmitri Shostakovich, whom Williams regarded as "the greatest composer of [his] time".

== Background ==
The Shostakovich series grew out of an intense involvement with Shostakovich's work that extended throughout Williams' adult life. Williams first heard Shostakovich's music (Symphony No. 1) as a teenager, when he was studying for an agricultural apprenticeship in Guyana, and the experience had a dramatic effect on him. In 1981 he described how hearing the symphony's finale had made him realize "a sonic connection with a new wellspring of this state of human consciousness we call ART"; and in 1987, he recalled that the music had "hit [him] really hard" in a way that had "profound visual connotations" and that made him "feel colour".

By 1969, Williams had been living and working in London for seventeen years. Following an initial period of excitement and artistic success, he had come to feel increasingly "isolated" and "exiled from the art world". It was at this time that he began immersing himself in a "wild unknown world of sound" and working on a "visual expression" of Shostakovich's music. From 1970 onward he spent large amounts of time each year working in studios in Jamaica and Florida.

== Creation, style and themes ==
In the first five years of working on the series, Williams experimented with different systems of notation: first a formal system, then a system based on colour-notation. He subsequently abandoned the idea of notation completely, but remained, in his words, "lost in a miasma of structural rendition". Shostakovich's death in 1975 prompted further reconsideration and intensified his pursuit of an approach that was more attuned to the "rich humanity and surrealistic mystery" of Shostakovich's work. The final series was created between 1980 and 1981.

Williams described Shostakovich as an exploration of "common concerns and perceptions in our work". In particular he stressed his admiration of Shostakovich's "world aesthetic" which was "open to all forms of music he heard" including jazz, Indian music and African drumming (he noted, for example, the presence of Samba in Symphony No. 11). He also regarded the series as an effort to find the "right connection" between music and painting – a problem that he thought had not been solved "even by Kandinsky".

The series is painted in an abstract expressionist style. In 1981, art critic Guy Brett described the paintings as combining "prominent and defined" forms that "convey the idea of musical structure" with "less defined and more suggestive areas of colour and texture". He also noted that the paintings incorporate iconography inspired by the pre-Columbian cultures of indigenous peoples of the Americas – a signature motif in Williams' work. In 2010, Leon Wainwright described the series as "rooted in a sensorial project" that explores the "tactility of vision" and reveals "the ability of music to create spatial depth that can be pictured and played with.

== Exhibitions and collections ==
Shostakovich was first exhibited at the Commonwealth Institute in 1981. The exhibition was opened on October 22 by Dmitri Shostakovich's son, Maxim Shostakovich. It has since been exhibited at the Royal Festival Hall (1984) and at the Hales Gallery (2013).

One of the paintings from the series, Shostakovich 3rd Symphony Opus 20, was purchased by the Tate in 1993.
