= Working People's Art Class =

Art school in Guyana

Location
- Georgetown; Guyana
- 6.82077°N 58.15697°W

Information
- School type: Art school
- Established: 1948
- Founder: Edward Rupert Burrowes
- Closed: 1956

The Working People's Art Class (WPAC), founded by Edward Rupert Burrowes in 1945, was the first established art institution in the colony of British Guiana, now the country of Guyana. A number of well-known Guyanese artists were taught at the WPAC.

== Foundation ==
Burrowes started to lead Working People's Free Art Classes in 1945 and formally founded the WPAC organization in 1948. The name drew the attention of the British authorities, who were concerned that the classes might be a front for a communist organization. They sent two detectives to join the class and see what was going on. One of them, Inspector John Campbell, became interested in drawing and painting and continued with the WPAC, later participating in exhibitions. By 1947, there were 86 students enrolled in the free WPAC, which had started in Georgetown in April that year.

== Operation ==
The WPAC was an institution in which common working people could develop their artistic skills. As well as teaching the people art history and appreciation, the WPAC contributed to developing a national consciousness, an awareness of the country and its peoples. It was funded by businesses and institutions. Burrowes was the only teacher, and gave classes on traditional Western artistic methods to anyone who chose to attend in whatever space he could find. The British Council became interested in the WPAC, and provided help in the form of £50 worth of art materials annually, materials that could not otherwise be obtained in British Guiana, as it was then. The WPAC put on annual shows. In 1954 its exhibition of paintings and sculpture had contributions from the WPAC and from the Guianese Art Group, the Friday Art Club and the Young Contemporaries' Art Club, as well as from one or two individual artists. The WPAC continued until 1956, and was housed at Queen's College.

== Influence ==
The WPAC helped a number of Guyanese artists at the start of their career. In 1947, Donald Locke attended a Working People's Art Class taught in Georgetown by Burrowes, which inspired him to take up painting. Locke later contributed regularly to WPAC exhibitions, and became a secretary or assistant to Burrowes in the early 1950s. Stanley Greaves is another Guyanese artist who attended the WPAC as a teenager and later became well known. Emerson Samuels was another artist who studied at the WPAC. The painter Aubrey Williams studied with E. R. Burrowes in the Working People's Art Class after returning from a two-year term with the Agriculture department in which he had lived with indigenous people in the jungle.
