= Seven and Five Society =

The Seven and Five Society was an art group of seven painters and five sculptors created in 1919 and based in London.

The group was originally intended to encompass traditional, conservative artistic sensibilities. The first exhibition catalogue said, "[we] feel that there has of late been too much pioneering along too many lines in altogether too much of a hurry." Artist Ben Nicholson joined in 1924, followed Henry Moore and Barbara Hepworth, and changed the society into a modernistic one and expelled the non-modernist artists. In 1935, the group was renamed the Seven and Five Abstract Group. At the Zwemmer Gallery in Charing Cross Road, London, they staged the first exhibition of entirely abstract works in Britain.

== Name ==
The first intention of the group was to include seven painters and five sculptors (‘VII and V’). This became ‘Seven & Five’ and, after a suggestion by Nicholson, simply '7 & 5'.

== Exhibitions ==
A list of the exhibitions held by the society:
- 12 Apr.–1 May 1920: Walker Art Gallery
- 1–30 Jun. 1921: Gieves Gallery, 21 Old Bond Street
- 20 Nov.–9 Dec. 1922: Walker Gallery
- 26 Nov.–22 Dec. 1923: Forbes and Paterson, 21 Old Bond Street
- 4–20 Dec. 1924: Paterson's
- 2–23 Jan. 1926: The Beaux Arts Gallery
- 4–22 Jan. 1927: The Beaux Arts Gallery
- 14 Feb.–6 Mar. 1928: The Beaux Arts Gallery
- 7–28 Mar. 1929: Arthur Tooth & Sons
- Jan. 1931: Leicester Galleries
- Feb. 1932: Leicester Galleries
- Feb. 1933: Leicester Galleries
- Mar. 1934: Leicester Galleries
- 2-22 Oct. 1935: Zwemmer Gallery

== Members ==
- John Banting
- Francis Butterfield
- Jessica Dismorr
- Claude Flight
- Barbara Hepworth
- Ivon Hitchens
- Frances Hodgkins
- Sidney Hunt
- David Jones
- Maurice Lambert
- Len Lye
- Henry Moore
- Cedric Morris
- Ben Nicholson
- Winifred Nicholson
- John Piper
- John Skeaping
- Cecil Stephenson
- Lydia Pearson-Righetti
- Christopher Wood
