= Gwyther Irwin =

British abstract artist (1931–2008)

(David) Gwyther (Broome) Irwin (7 May 1931 – 18 October 2008) was a British abstract artist born in Basingstoke, Hampshire, who had lived much of his life in north Cornwall. He was educated in Dorset, at Goldsmiths College and at the Central School of Art in London 1951–1954. Irwin first came to prominence in 1957 with an exhibition at Gallery One, and another at Gimpel Fils in 1959. In 1964, he represented Britain at the Venice Biennale, along with Joe Tilson, Bernard Meadows and Roger Hilton. In 1960, he married Elizabeth Gowlett and they had two sons and one daughter.

His most famous artworks consisted of pictures assembled from newsprint and fragments of advertisements on paper, which he collected from the streets with his wife, and which were then worked up into collages often of fine delicacy and quite subtle shades. Some of his later works also used string, wood shavings, chalk and paint.

"Gwyther Irwin's latest collages...are evidently miracles of patient assembly...they set out to achieve the subtlest and slowest possible shifts in tonality from umber darkness to creamy light and back again. The patience, the subtlety, the muted gradations of every effect combine to produce an atmosphere of studied beauty." (The Times, 18 September 1959)

In the 1960s he taught at art schools in Hornsey, Corsham and Chelsea before becoming head of fine art at Brighton polytechnic between 1969 and 1984.

== Exhibitions ==
- Gallery One, 1957
- Redfern Gallery, Metavisual Tachiste Abstract, 1957
- Institute of Contemporary Arts, "Three Collagists," 1958
- Gimpel Fils, 1959
- Situation, London, 1960
- Paris Biennale, 1960
- Biennale des Jeunes, Paris, 1961
- The Art of Assemblage, MoMA, New York, 1961
- Gimpel Fils, 1962
- Gimpel Fils, 1963,
- Venice Biennale, 1964
- Recent British Painting, Tate Gallery, London, 1967
- Two one-man exhibitions in 1975 & 1978
- Kettle’s Yard, Cambridge, 1981
- Retrospective, Gimpel Fils, 1987
- John Jones Gallery, 1992
- Barbican Art Gallery, 1993
- Royal Cornwall Museum, Truro, 1995
- West of England Academy, Bristol, 1996
- Tate Britain, 2004
- Redfern Gallery & JHW Fine Art, London, 2006
- Lemon Street Gallery, Truro, scheduled for February 2009 will now become a memorial tribute.

== Bibliography ==
- Gwyther Irwin, Collage, Gimpel Fils, London, 1962, ASIN B0007KED1A
- Alan Bowness, Gwyther Irwin, Quadrum Books, Bruxelles, 1964, ASIN B0007KELU8
- Roger Hilton, Gwyther Irwin, Bernard Meadows, Joe Tilson, An exhibition catalogue, with illustrations, Stedelijk Museum, Amsterdam, 1965
- Gwyther Irwin: work in progress 1957-1967, [exhibition] 5–30 September 1967, Gimpel Fils, London, 1967, ASIN B0007JX2NQ
- Gwyther Irwin, 7 April to 2 May 1970, Gimpel Fils, London, 1970
- Nicholas Wadley, Gwyther Irwin a Retrospective, London, Gimpel Fils. 1987
- Gwyther Irwin, Recent Paintings, 15 February-17 March 1994, Redfern Gallery, London, 1994

== See also ==
- Mimmo Rotella
