= William Johnston (painter) =

American painter

- Born: 1732; Boston, Massachusetts, Great Britain
- Died: April 1772 (aged 39–40); Bridgetown, Barbados, Great Britain

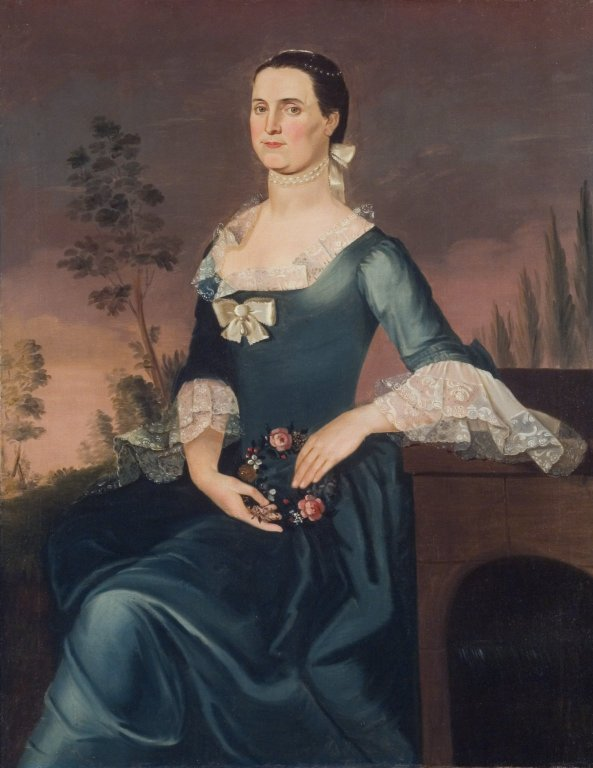
Portrait of Mrs. Thomas Mumford VI, c. 1763, oil on canvas, in the collection of the Brooklyn Museum of Art

William Johnston (1732 – April 1772) was a colonial American painter. He was the first painter to spend any significant amount of time in Connecticut, and was active in Portsmouth, New Hampshire as well.

Johnston was born in Boston, Massachusetts, one of the four sons of the japanner Thomas Johnston and his wife, Rachel Thwing. His brother John became a painter as well. John Smibert and Peter Pelham were among the family's neighbors, and William was a friend of John Singleton Copley, who was six years his junior; he likely also knew the latter's half-brother, Henry Pelham. He began his career as a musician, serving as organist at Boston's Christ Church from 1750 to 1753, before he decided to become a painter. This career, too, he began in Boston, but for many years no works from his early career were known until a pair of portraits in the Metropolitan Museum of Art were identified as his. He traveled next to Portsmouth, New Hampshire for work, living there from 1759 until 1762. He then moved to Connecticut, remaining in the colony for at least three years; during his sojourn there he worked in New London, New Haven, and the area around Hartford. He was the first painter to work there – residents previously having to travel to Boston, Newport, or New York City to be painted – and may have been lured there by his sister, Susan Hobby, who lived in Middletown. He counted a number of members of the most prominent families in Connecticut, including the Mumfords, among his patrons.

Johnston returned to Boston sometime before 1766. On December 2 of that year he married Christy Bruce, widow of Samuel Bruce, becoming stepfather to her two children. He had moved to Barbados by 1770, continuing to find work as a portraitist and receiving seventy-five pounds a year to play the organ; a letter from that year to Copley makes no mention of his wife or stepchildren, suggesting that they had by this point died. The letter also requests a portrait of his sister, Mrs. Hobby, from Copley. Johnston himself died in Bridgetown relatively soon thereafter, in April, 1772, apparently of a sudden illness. Interment was in the parish church of St. Michael. Johnston left a will in which his possessions were bequeathed to Rachel Beckles, sister of Barbados attorney general Henry Beckles. His death was noted in the Boston press.

Stylistically, Johnston's work is very similar to that of his friend Copley, adopting similar poses and many of the stylistic characteristics of his early work; indeed, at least three of Johnston's portraits have been misidentified as those of the younger artist in past years. His paintings also suggest the influence of Joseph Blackburn, who was painting in Portsmouth at the same time he was there, although his style is more linear. He was generally comfortable working in a three-quarter length format; his greatest difficulty lay in attaching the sitter's head to the body. Many of his poses and backgrounds are drawn from English mezzotints of the period. Today two of Johston's paintings may be found in the Metropolitan Museum of Art, while one is owned by the Connecticut Historical Society, and another is owned by the Brooklyn Museum of Art.
