= Alison Chapman-Andrews =

Alison Chapman-Andrews (born Alison Armstrong, November 30th 1942- June 1st 2025) was a renowned Barbadian painter. Born in Hertford, Chapman-Andrews studied from 1963 to 1966 at the worldclass Royal College of Art, receiving the ARCA award for her painting. She moved to Barbados in 1971 and began painting its landscapes, with a particular focus on its trees such as the royal palm, which has since become central to her work. Her early paintings were essentially realistic, but as her career developed further her paintings became more and more stylized. During her career she has worked as a teacher, curator and newspaper columnist as well as an artist, and in 2006 she received the Governor General's award for her work. She was married for a time to the painter Stanley Greaves, but the two later divorced; she was previously married to Paul Chapman-Andrews, a surveyor.

Chapman-Andrews is represented in the collections of the Barbados Gallery of Art and the University of the West Indies, as well as numerous private collections.
