= Ras Akyem =

Barbadian painter

Ras Akyem (sometimes called Ras Akyem Ramsey, Ras Akyem I Ramsey, or Ras Akyem I Ramsay) is a Barbadian painter. A graduate of the Edna Manley School of Art in Jamaica, his work is heavily influenced by the Rastafari movement and bears resemblance to the paintings of Jean-Michel Basquiat. His work is frequently exhibited alongside that of Ras Ishi Butcher.
