= Litchfield Street =

Street in the City of Westminster, London

Coordinates: 51.5127°N 0.1283°W

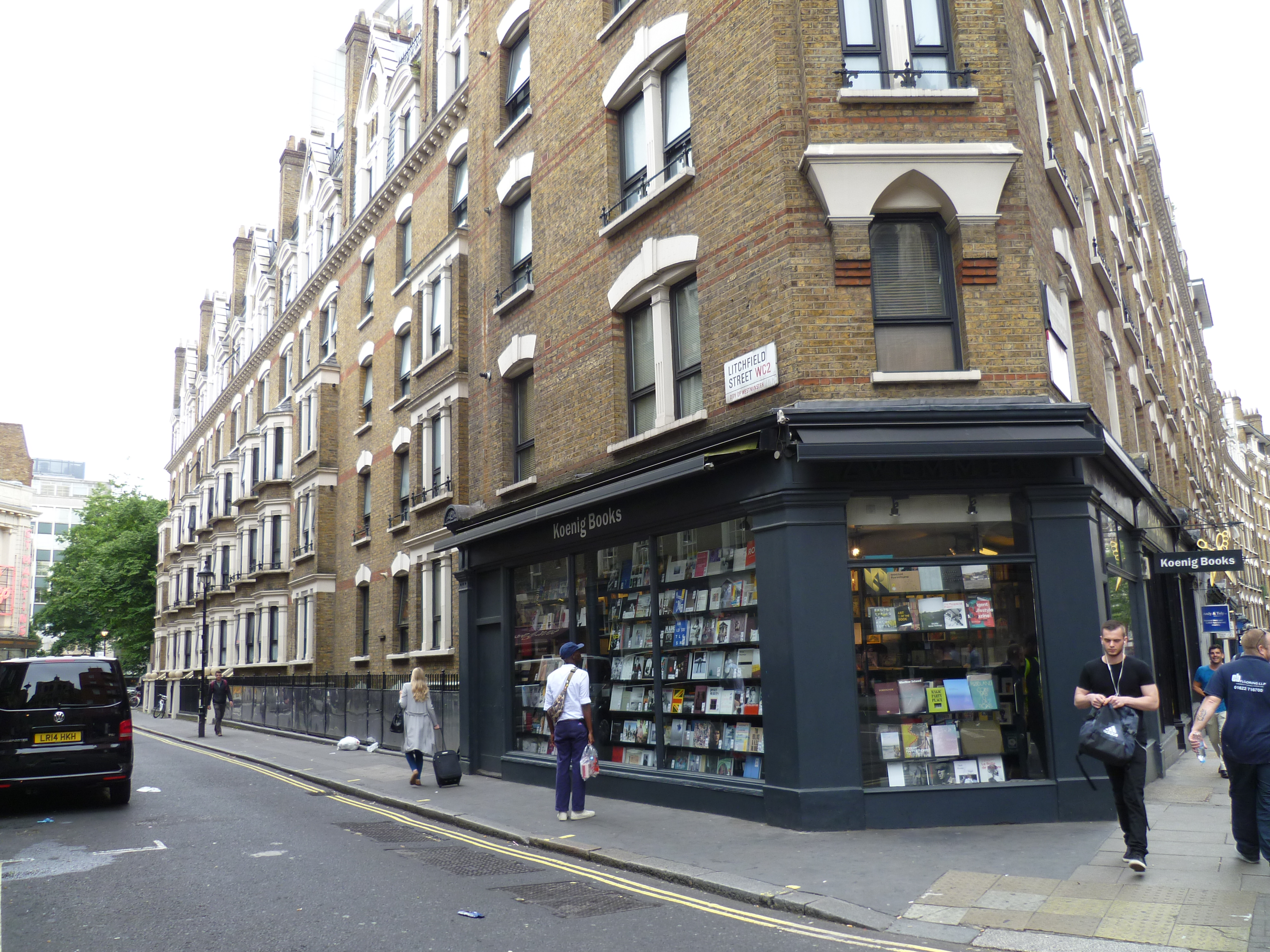
Litchfield Street, south side, looking east.

Litchfield Street is a street in the City of Westminster, London, that runs from Charing Cross Road in the west to West Street in the east. The street is only half its original length.

In 1929 Anton Zwemmer established the Zwemmer Gallery in Litchfield Street (near the corner with Charing Cross Road), which became "a mecca for artists throughout Britain and a center for the modern art movement".

Bunjies Coffee House & Folk Cellar, one of the original folk cafés of the 1950s/1960s, was situated at 27 Litchfield Street.

On 15 February 1996, a 5-pound (2.3 kg) high explosive bomb placed in a telephone box at the junction of Charing Cross Road and Litchfield Street, was disarmed by Police.
