= Stanley Greaves =

Guyanese painter and writer (born 1934)

- Born: 1934 (age 91–92); Georgetown, Guyana
- Education: Working Peoples' Art Class; University of Newcastle-upon-Tyne
- Occupations: Painter and writer
- Awards: Guyana Prize for Literature

Stanley Greaves (born 1934) is a Guyanese painter and writer who is one of the Caribbean's most distinguished artists. He was awarded the Guyana Prize for Literature for his first poetry collection, Horizons: Selected Poems 1969–1998.

Writing in 1995 at the time of a retrospective exhibition to celebrate Greaves's 60th birthday, Rupert Roopnarine stated: "It may be that no major Caribbean artist of our time has been more fecund and versatile than Stanley Greaves of Guyana." Greaves himself has said of his own creativity:

I still don't talk about myself as making art! Other people do that. I am a maker of things. In the early days, I found empty matchboxes, cigarette boxes, bits of string, wire, empty boot-polish tins, whatever, and made things. Drawing was just another activity, and it still is. My favorite medium is still wood, of course. My hitherto secret preoccupation with writing poems, which has now come to light, is another form of making. Recently at the University of Birmingham, where I did a reading, I was asked if the paintings influenced the poetry, and I said, "No, they come from the same source."

== Biography ==
Greaves was born in Georgetown, Guyana. He studied art in Guyana with Edward Burrowes in the Working Peoples' Art Class (1948–61) and from 1963 to 1968 attended University of Newcastle-upon-Tyne in the UK, where he studied painting, majoring in sculpture for the B.A. Hons degree in Fine Art. He also earned a Diploma in Art Teaching. He was a Fulbright Scholar from 1979 to 1980 at Howard University, where he did printmaking and sculpture for the MFA degree.

In Guyana, Greaves taught at Sacred Heart Primary, St. Stanislaus College (his old schools), Berbice High School, Queen's College, from 1971 to 1975, and was the first Head of the Division of Creative Arts at the University of Guyana from 1975 to 1986. He left Guyana for Barbados in 1987; he now lives in North Carolina.

Before and while in Barbados he served on the first art and craft panel designing the syllabus for the Caribbean Examinations Council and has been a part-time tutor at the Barbados Community College. He was elected a Distinguished Honourable Fellow at University of the West Indies Cave Hill Campus in 2003 and it was extended.

=== Work as an artist ===
Greaves is primarily a painter but has worked in several different media: sculpture, ceramics and graphics. He was awarded the Guyana national honour of the Golden Arrow of Achievement in 1975. He has exhibited at national level, winning several prizes, and has had one-man shows. He represented Guyana twice at the São Paulo Art Biennial and once at the Medellín bienniale in Colombia. He has had major exhibitions in the United Kingdom (in 1999 his work was shown in the landmark exhibition curated by Gottfried Donkor, The Elders, alongside that of Brother Everald Brown of Jamaica),

Greaves won a gold medal for painting in the Barbados entry at the Santo Domingo Bienniale. He has been exhibiting since arriving in North Carolina, United States, in 2008, at the Fayetteville Museum of Art, Moruca Gallery Washington, the University of Fayetteville, the State University of North Carolina and Claflin University in South Carolina, the OAS in Washington, and Castellani House in Guyana.

In 2014, he celebrated his 80th birthday with an exhibition of 24 paintings based on his reading of the novels of the renowned Guyanese author Wilson Harris. The paintings were also shown at the OAS in 2015. Greaves won the gold medal for painting in the 2017 Guyana Visual Arts and Craft Exhibition, where he declared it was his last showing in that exhibition. In 2018, he showed photographs of 14 sculptures – The El Dorado Series, sponsored by Diamond distilleries. The actual works were shown at the OAS 2019.

Over the years his paintings have appeared on the cover of several books. He has also done pen-and-ink illustrations for poems of Martin Carter, Ian Mc David, both distinguished poets of the Caribbean.

=== Writing ===
His first poetry collection, Horizons, published by Peepal Tree Press in 2002, won the Guyana Prize for Literature in the first book of poems category. His 2009 collection, The Poems Man, was also published by Peepal Tree Press. Haiku, the third poetry book by Greaves, was published in 2015. Each contains pen and ink drawings.

Greaves co-authored, with Anne Walmsley, Art in the Caribbean: An Introduction, published in 2010 by New Beacon Books, and launched at the October Gallery in London. He has also collaborated with Akima Mc Pherson of the University of Guyana on a series of articles in the Sunday Stabroek about individual works in the Guyana National Collection.

== Personal life ==
Greaves was married to Barbara Klien and they had four children. They were divorced.

Greaves then married to the painter Alison Chapman-Andrews.

Both have died.

== Selected awards ==
- 1975: Golden Arrow of Achievement, Guyana.
- 1979: Fulbright Award
- 1994: Gold medal, Santo Domingo Biennale of Painting (for triptych There Is a Meeting Here Tonight)
- 2002: Guyana Prize for Literature for best first book of poems (Horizons: Selected Poems 1969–1998)
- 2014: Guyana National Lifetime Award for Art
- 2017: Gold Medal First Prize (painting) Guyana National Art & Craft Competition
