= Anton Zwemmer =

British bookseller, book distributor, art dealer and publisher

Anton Zwemmer (1892–1979) was a Dutch-born British bookseller, book distributor, art dealer, publisher and collector who founded Zwemmer's Bookshop and the Zwemmer Gallery in London. He was a "friend and patron of many leading artists", from Picasso to Henry Moore and Wyndham Lewis, and he played "an important role in spreading knowledge and appreciation of modern art" in Britain during the 1920s and 1930s.

== Early life ==
Anton Zwemmer was born in Haarlem, The Netherlands on 18 February 1892. His parents were Arie and Baukje Huizinga Zwemmer who were of modest means.

Leaving school at the age of fifteen, he worked for the publisher Herman Tjeenk Willink and the bookseller H. N. Mul in his hometown, before moving to Amsterdam where he took up a position with the booksellers Kirberger & Kesper, a specialist in English literature, which sent him to England to develop connections with booktrade there. In 1914 he moved permanently to England to work for that country's leading book wholesaler, Simpkin Marshall. After a short period he was appointed as the manager of Harrods department store's bookshop in Knightsbridge, London and in 1916 as a staff member of Richard Jäschke's antiquarian, modern first editions and foreign language bookshop at 79 Charing Cross Road, in the City of Westminster.

== Arts bookseller ==
When Jäschke, a German citizen, was interned during the First World War, Zwemmer was left in charge of the business until 1918. Eventually the latter became a partner and in 1923 purchased the bookshop and renamed it A. Zwemmer (it would be commonly referred to as "Zwemmer's").

Zwemmer changed the focus of the business from antiquarian books to art books and magazines, and in particular imported European books. After years of being cut off from the "primary sources of modern art" in France and Germany due to the war, and with their taste whetted for a new kind of art by Roger Fry's pre-war exhibitions of Post-Impressionism, and dissatisfied with the restraint of the Royal Academy and the major galleries, the British public and artists were keen on Zwemmer's offerings of quality art books, art prints and "domestic and foreign art journals".

Zwemmer's bookshop for a long period was the main place in London where modern and avant-garde art could be explored and where books and journals on the new artists such as Gauguin, Van Gogh and Matisse, and with the latest criticism regarding their work, could be obtained. Zwemmer's was the only place in London where one would be "likely to see" livres d'artiste, Wyndham Lewis's The Enemy and Stanley Morison's typographical journal The Fleuron. The bookshop's display windows were famous for the bold imagery and the bright colours of the books and artworks on show.

Sir Kenneth Clark and Sir Anthony Blunt both testified to the value of this bookshop in its early days to the "scholarly student of art history" while Henry Moore, John Piper and Graham Sutherland spoke of the "inspiration" its art books gave young sculptors and painters.

Zwemmer was a lifelong friend and business associate of Albert Skira, a Swiss publisher who ran an eponymous publishing house offering lavish colour art books and livres d'artiste and who was a friend of artists such as Picasso and Matisse. Zwemmer was notably an early buyer of Skira's books and was later the agent for Skira's books in Britain.

== Arts publisher ==
From the mid-1920s Zwemmer supplemented his bookselling activities with the publication of art books, firstly, on Giotto (1927) and then on Botticelli (1930) and Picasso (1931), with the Picasso book being the first in the English language on that artist. He gave support to British artists and sculptors, such as Henry Moore, and the modern movement in British art, by publishing works such as Herbert Read's Henry Moore, Sculptor: With an Appreciation by Herbert Read and Thirty-six Full-page Plates (1934), the first monograph to be published on that sculptor.

Books with Zwemmer's imprint, A. Zwemmer Ltd., featured quality printing with full page photographs of paintings and sculptures, "integrated" text and illustrations, "modern typefaces" and a "sophisticated" design format. They were often produced as international co-editions with distinguished European or American art publishers, which led to economies of scale and a great publicity exposure for the books. Moreover, his co-editions gave the English public access to many French and German works which would "otherwise have remained inaccessible".

== Zwemmer Gallery ==
In 1929 Zwemmer established an art gallery, the Zwemmer Gallery, at 26 Litchfield Street, London, not far from his bookshop in Charing Cross Road. The Times at the time argued that the move was a "logical ... development" as "a selection of English and foreign books on modern art" was on show in the gallery.

The Zwemmer Gallery became a "mecca" for British artists and a centre for the modern art movement in Britain, staging shows on such artists and sculptors as Henry Moore, Jacob Epstein, Henri Gaudier-Brzeska and Edward Bawden, as well as, in 1932, an exhibition on the Curwen Press.

Later exhibitions were mounted for Joan Miró, Georges Braque, Marc Chagall, Georges Rouault and other modern artists. In 1934 the Gallery staged Salvador Dalí's first one man show in Britain. In 1934, the exhibition Objective Abstractions was held in the gallery, featuring the work of the British Objective Abstraction movement. In October 1935, the Seven and Five Society's final exhibition was held in the gallery, which notably was the first all-abstract show ever to be held in the country. Through his gallery, as through his bookselling and publishing, Anton Zwemmer's constant goal was to "support the recent work of modern artists".

== Second World War and after ==
During the war years from 1939 Zwemmer's collaborative projects with European publishers had to be suspended. Due to the impossibility of importing books from the Continent he concentrated on selling antiquarian books and due to his age, he brought in his two sons, Desmond and John, to assist in running the business.

In the postwar period the gallery promoted younger and emerging British artists including John Bratby and Harold Cheesman, the latter being a pupil of the English surrealist Paul Nash. In 1960 the Australian painter Arthur Boyd had his first London exhibition there.

From 1944 Anton Zemmer published, with Lund Humphries, a multivolume work on the sculpture and drawings of his friend Henry Moore and in 1949, he collaborated with Skira to publish Stuart Gilbert's translation of André Malraux's two volume work, The Psychology of Art.

During the 1950s his son John would go on to supervise the bookselling side of the business while Desmond would concentrate on the publishing. The Zwemmer Gallery would continue operating until 1968.

Anton Zwemmer died on 23 January 1979. His residence at that date was The Priory, Rotherfield, Crowborough, East Sussex. His inferred spouse, Lilian Zwemmer (17 May 1893 – 23 April 1971), had in 1971 been living at the same address.

== Legacy ==
In his Henry Moore: Writings and Conversations, Henry Moore observed: "I could mention eight or nine such individuals (apart from artists themselves) whose efforts during my lifetime have helped to change the whole climate of the English art world (...) one of them is Anton Zwemmer (...)."

His bookshop, art gallery and publishing house occupied a central place in the history of twentieth century British art. Art critic Herbert Read wrote of the bookshop in 1962 that: "Zwemmer's was always more than a bookshop: it was a challenge in the midst of our provincial ignorance and philistinism, a beacon of enlightenment."

== In popular culture ==
Zwemmer's bookshop is mentioned in John le Carré's spy novel, Tinker Tailor Soldier Spy: "In Zwemmers he examined a coffee-table book called Musical Instruments Down the Ages and remembered that Camilla had had a late lesson with Dr. Sand, her flute teacher".
