= Denis Bowen =

- Born: 5 April 1921; Kimberley, South Africa
- Died: 23 March 2006 (aged 84)
- Occupation(s): Artist and gallery director
- Known for: Paintings, founding the New Vision Group and New Vision Centre Gallery

Denis Bowen (5 April 1921 – 23 March 2006) was a South African artist, gallery director and promoter of abstract and avant-garde art in Britain. He was founder of the New Vision Group and the New Vision Centre Gallery, both of which played an important role in the post-World War II British art scene.

== Life ==
Denis Bowen was born on 5 April 1921 in Kimberley, South Africa. His father was Welsh and his mother English. After being orphaned at a young age, Bowen moved to England where he was raised by his aunt in Huddersfield. He enrolled at the Huddersfield School of Art in 1936. After serving in the Navy in World War II, Bowen resumed his art studies at the Royal College of Art in London in 1946.

Between 1940 and 1986 Bowen taught art at numerous institutions including: the Kingston Institute of Art, Hammersmith School of Art, Birmingham School of Art, the Central School of Art and Design, the Royal College of Art and the University of British Columbia in Vancouver.

In 1951 Bowen founded the New Vision Group, which initially emerged from meetings and displays that he organised with his students in 1951. In 1955, Bowen worked alongside Frank Avray Wilson and Halima Nalecz to open a permanent exhibition space for the New Vision Group and associated artists. Bowen, Wilson and Nalecz were all members of the New Vision Group and also the Free Painters Group (later Free Painters and Sculptors) which had been founded a few years earlier.

Their new exhibition space was called the New Vision Centre Gallery (NVCG), and was located on Seymour Place in the Marble Arch area of London. While the importance of the NVCG was often overlooked while it was active, its significant role in shaping British art in the postwar period, and in promoting international artists and abstract art in particular, has been recognised in subsequent years. Artists who exhibited at the NVCG included Aubrey Williams, Judy Cassab, Ron Russell, and Rotraut. Bowen served as director of the gallery from the time of its opening to the time of its closure in 1966.

Working alongside British artist Kenneth Coutts-Smith, Bowen launched the Commonwealth Biennale of Abstract Art at the NVGC in 1963.

== Art ==
In the early years of his artistic career, from the early 1950s to the mid-1960s, Bowen formed part of a small group of UK-based artists who were associated with Tachisme and Art Informel. Between 1969 and 1980 he produced a series of "psychedelic works" that incorporated lighting effects (including the use of UV lights), music and live music performances. From the 1980s onward, Bowen's work developed cosmological and planetary themes.
