= Frank Avray Wilson =

British artist and writer

- Born: 3 May 1914; Vacoas, Mauritius
- Died: 1 January 2009 (aged 94)
- Occupations: Artist, writer

Frank Avray Wilson (3 May 1914 – 1 January 2009) was a British artist, author and vegetarian. He was one of the first British artists to use Tachist or action painting techniques.

== Early life ==
Wilson was born in Vacoas, Mauritius, in 1914, the son of Albert James Wilson, a sugar manufacturer, by his marriage to Anna Avray. He was educated at Brighton College and St John's College, Cambridge, where he took a degree in biology, before studying art in Paris and Norway.

== Career ==
Inspired by both American Abstract Expressionism and French Tachisme, Avray Wilson produced amongst the most dynamic abstracts during the post-war period in Britain. His work ranged from spiky linear compositions, through others more spare and geometric towards a mature style that comprised images both disciplined and energetic. Critic Peter Davies described this contrast as ‘a meaningful, if tense, dichotomy between structure on the one hand and what Avray Wilson termed "Vitalist" or impulsive free form on the other’, whilst Cathy Courtney characterised Avray Wilson's paintings as ‘articulating something sensed but not fully seen’. Seeking to 'create a synthetic vitality, more living than life, the means of supplying our anti-vital, anti-human society with intense symbols', Avray Wilson's scientific background was of key importance in understanding his approach to painting, which he expounded in several books.

The first London showing of his work was in 1951 at The Redfern Gallery's Summer Exhibition. In 1953, Wilson met Denis Bowen and they formed the New Vision Group then, in 1956, the New Vision Centre Gallery, a showplace for abstract and other modern art near Marble Arch in central London. Avray Wilson had his first solo show at the Obelisk Gallery in 1954, before being included in the British Council's influential La Peinture Anglaise Contemporain, which toured in France and Switzerland. He also took part in the New York Foundation's New Trends in British Painting in Rome in 1957 and was shortlisted for the John Moore's prize exhibition in Liverpool in 1959. He later showed at Leicester Galleries, the Royal Academy of Arts and Austin/Desmond Fine Art amongst others. He was represented for many years by the Redfern Gallery and gained a reputation in Europe, notably in Belgium and in France where he also exhibited. Major retrospectives were held by the Paisnel Gallery in 2011 and by the Whitford Fine Art Gallery in 2016 and 2018.

Avray Wilson's work is held in the United States by the Carnegie Institute, Pittsburg and Cleveland Museum of Art in Ohio among others. His work can also be found in Australia in the Art Gallery of New South Wales. Public collections in the UK include the Arts Council, the British Museum, Loughborough University and galleries in Durham, Leeds, Leicester, Swansea and Wakefield.

== Personal life ==
Avray Wilson married Higford Eckbo, a Norwegian, on 28 April 1936, and they had four children: Austin Raymond, Wendy-Ann, Jason, and Norman. His daughter, Anglo-Norwegian artist Wendy-Ann Wilson, went on to marry an American architect, Thomas J. Holzbog, and is the mother of Arabella Holzbog. His grandson Halliday Avray Wilson was elected Chevalier de l'ordre des Arts et des Lettres by Fredrick Mitterand, Minister of Culture France in 2011 for his contribution to the arts in France and internationally with his monumental sculptures.

Avray was a vegetarian for ethical reasons. He became a vegetarian through influence from his wife. Avray authored two books supportive of vegetarianism for C. W. Daniel Company. He identified as a philosophical vitalist.

== Selected public collections ==
Avray Wilson's work can be found in the following collections:

- British Museum, London
- Victoria and Albert Museum, London
- Fitzwilliam Museum, Cambridge
- National Museum of Wales, Cardiff
- Cheltenham Art Gallery and Museum
- Loughborough University
- Leeds City Art Gallery
- Manchester City Art Gallery
- Northampton Museum and Art Gallery
- Southampton City Art Gallery
- Glynn Vivian Art Gallery, Swansea
- The Hepworth Wakefield
- The Carnegie Institute, Pittsburgh
- The Getty Research Institute, California
- Cleveland Museum of Art, Ohio
- The Toledo Museum of Art, Ohio
- The National Museum, Gdańsk

== Selected exhibitions ==
- 1954: Obelisk Gallery, London
- 1955: Frank Avray Wilson: Recent Paintings, AIA Gallery, London
- 1956: Galerie Helios Art, Brussels
- 1957: British Council touring exhibition
- 1957: Metavisual, Tachist, Abstract, The Redfern Gallery, London
- 1957: Frank Avray Wilson, Galerie Craven, Paris
- 1958: New Trends in British Painting, Rome
- 1958: Survey of Contemporary British Painting, Howard Wise Gallery, New York
- 1959: John Moores Prize Exhibition, Liverpool
- 1959: Six Young Painters, Arts Council touring exhibition
- 1960: Art Alive, Northampton Museum and Art Gallery
- 1961: Avray Wilson, The Redfern Gallery, London
- 1961: Avray Wilson, Galerie Fricker, Paris
- 1961: Commonwealth Vision Painters 1961, Commonwealth Institute, London
- 1962: Avray Wilson, Galerie im Griechenbeisl, Vienna
- 1970: Works from the Personal Collection of Sir Herbert Read, The Morley Gallery, Morley College, London
- 1986: Frank Avray Wilson: recent work and some recent paintings, Warwick Arts Trust, London
- 1995: Frank Avray Wilson. An Exhibition of Recent Paintings and Work from the 50s to 80s, The Redfern Gallery, London
- 2011: Frank Avray Wilson – the Vital Years, Paisnel Gallery, London
- 2016: Frank Avray Wilson: British Taschist, Whitford Fine Art Gallery, London

== Bibliography ==
Wilson was the author of the following books:

- Poems of Hope and Despair, 1949, Port Louis, Mauritius
- Food for the Golden Age, 1954, C. W. Daniel Company
- Art into Life: An Interpretation of Contemporary Trends in Painting, 1958, Centaur Press
- Art as Understanding, 1963, Routledge and Kegan Paul
- Human Existence as a Whole, 1963, Routledge and Kegan Paul
- Food Fit for Humans, 1975, C. W. Daniel Company
- Alchemy as a Way of Life, 1976, C. W. Daniel Company
- Nature Regained, 1976, Branden Press
- Crystal and Cosmos, 1977, Coventure Ltd
- Art as Revelation, 1981, Centaur Press, London
- The Way of Creation: Cosmos, Consciousness and the New Sciences, 1985, Coventure
- Seeing is Believing: A Painter's Search for Meaning, 1995, Book Guild

To mark his 1995 exhibition, The Redfern Gallery published Frank Avray Wilson: An Exhibition of Recent Paintings and Work from the 50s to 80s by Cathy Courtney.
