= Indigenous peoples in Guyana =

Earliest inhabitants of Guyana

Indigenous Guyanese
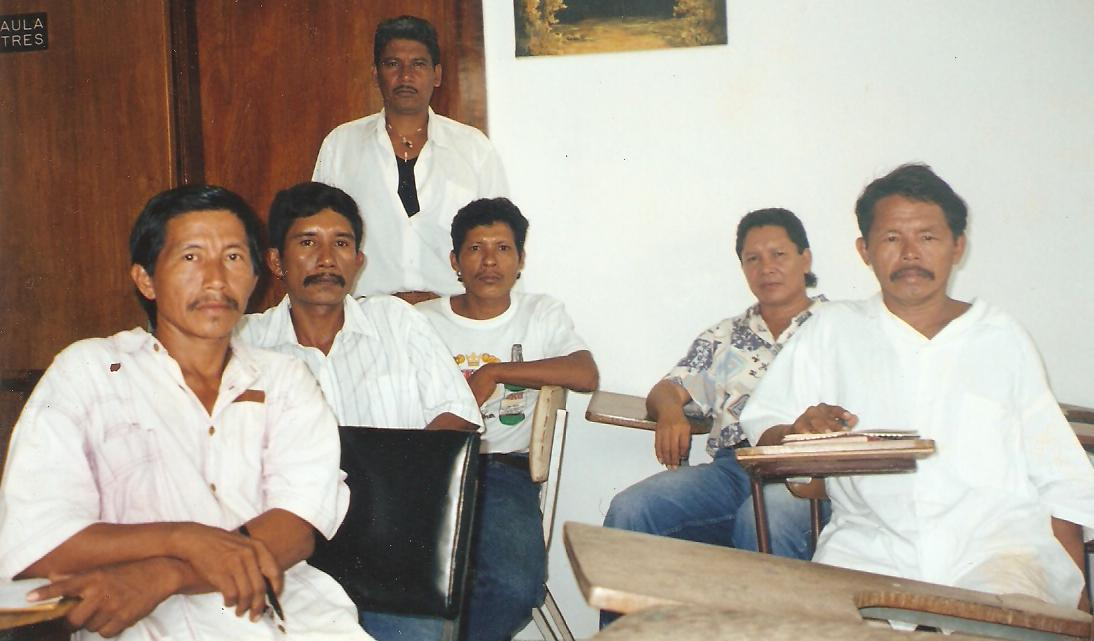
- The Lokono Artists Group. From left to right: "Puffy" Clenkien, Telford Taylor, Ossie Hussein (standing), Foster Simon, George Simon and Lynus Clenkien

Total population
- 78,492; 10.51% of Guyana's population

Languages
- English, Guyanese Creole, and Indigenous languages (including the nine recognized languages of Akawaio, Macushi, Waiwai, Lokono, Patamona, Warrau, Kalina, Wapishana, and Arekuna), Portuguese, Spanish, Dutch

Religion
- Christianity, Indigenous religions, and others

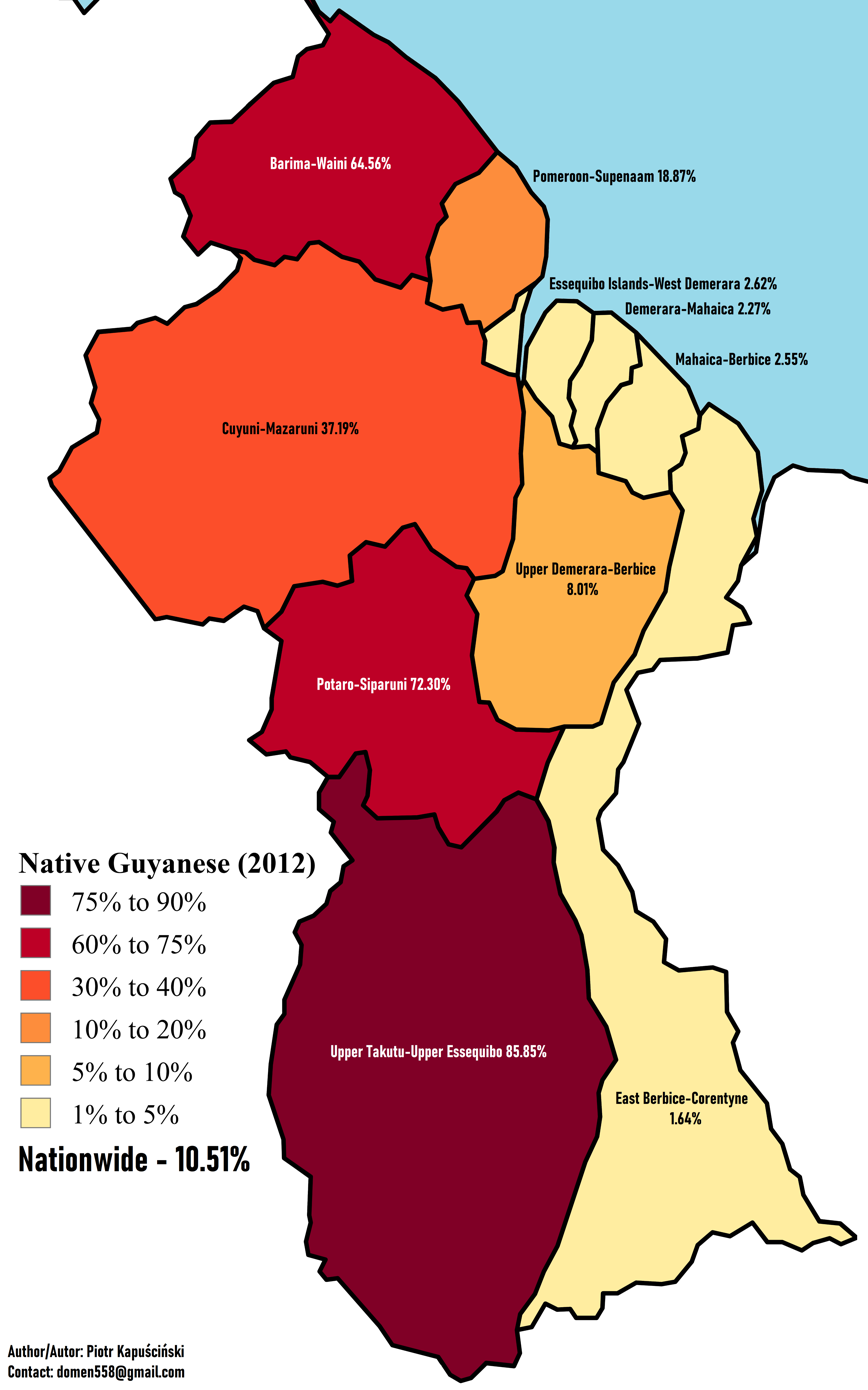
Distribution of Native Guyanese in 2012

Indigenous peoples in Guyana, Native Guyanese, Amerindian Guyanese, or First Nations are Guyanese people who are of Indigenous ancestry. They comprise approximately 10.51% of Guyana's population. Amerindians are credited with the invention of the canoe, as well as Cassava-based dishes and Guyanese pepperpot, the national dish of Guyana. Amerindian languages have also been incorporated in the lexicon of Guyanese Creole.

Customs and languages vary across the nations of Amerindians. Each group has a distinct language, although there is understanding between speakers of Pemon, Kapóng, and Macushi. According to a survey conducted by the Inter-American Development Bank, only 20% of households were fluent in their own language, and higher fluency was related to longer distance from the capital. Caribs have been historically viewed as a warrior people, and while there is inter-tribal rivalry, much of what remains today was instigated during European colonization.

A lack of writing system at the time of European contact has contributed to a wide array of spellings of group names; an example was the Warao, who had nearly 30 different variants according to early documents.

== Post-Columbian history ==
Early interaction with the Dutch involved trade, or militia services such as hunting escaped slaves which continued on into the 1800s for the British. They were viewed by European colonial governments as protectors of the lands, or their borders, from claims by Spain and France. Amerindians themselves were also viewed as needing protection, leading to policies of missionization. Early land concessions and rights granted to appease Amerindians in order for European interests to survive in the Guianas eroded with the end of slavery and the growing viewpoint that Amerindians were benefiting by the civilizing force of European culture. Missions and schools were founded from various Christian societies, and these continue to play an important role in many contemporary communities.

In 1899, the Hague tribunal to designate the border between British Guiana and Venezuela used evidence that by the accepting British sovereignty, the traditional lands of those tribes were thus a part of British Guiana.

The Constitutional Conference of 1965 recognized the rights of Amerindians. Contrasting with the paternalistic missionary approach, integration and assimilation became more important in the 20th century. In 1976, an Indigenous Residence was opened in Georgetown to provide accommodation for hinterland people visiting Georgetown for educational, medical or other purposes.

Titling is a key current issue for Indigenous communities, with encroachment on traditional lands for mining, logging, or other commercial uses. Court cases have presented problems with economic activity performed in adjacent lands affecting Amerindian communities, such as pollution of water supplies.

Amerindians founded the Alleluia church, which combines Christian beliefs with Amerindian traditions.

== Contemporary groups ==
- Akawaio (Also known as Acahuayo, Acewaio, Akawai, or Ingariko), Mazaruni River basin and Venezuela
- Island Caribs, known as their mainland counterpart Kalina (Also known as Cariña, Galibi, Kalihna, Kalinya, Kariña, Kari’nja), northeast
- Patamona (Also known as Ingarikó), west central, Brazil, and Venezuela
- Lokono, Guyana, Trinidad, Venezuela
- Macushi, Brazil and Guyana
- Pemon (Arecuna), upland savannah, Brazil, Guyana, and Venezuela
- Waiwai, Amazonas, Brazil and Guyana
- Wapishana (Also known as Uapixana, Vapidiana, Wapichan, Wapichana, Wapisana, Wapishshiana, Wapisiana, Wapitxana, Wapixana) Brazil and Guyana
- Warao (Also known as Guarao, Guarauno, Warau, Warrau), Guyana and Venezuela

== Nearby nations that may have had a presence in Guyana ==
- Atorada, southwest and Brazil
- Auaké, Brazil and Guyana
- Jaoi (Yao), Guyana, Trinidad and Venezuela
- Mapidian (also known as Mawayana), southwest
- Taruma, Guyana, Brazil, Suriname. Recognised in Maruranau by the Wapishana.
- Tiriyó

== Notable people ==
- Sydney Allicock, former vice-president of Guyana
- Stephen Campbell, Lokono politician
- Valerie Hart
- Oswald Hussein
- Jean La Rose, Arawak environmentalist and Indigenous rights activist
- George Simon (b. 1947), artist and archaeologist
- Marcus Wilson

== Lands inhabited by Indigenous peoples ==
- Epira Amerindian District (East Berbice-Corentyne Area)
- Epira Amerindian Reservation (East Berbice-Corentyne Area)
- Kanuku Amerindian District (Upper Takutu-Upper Essequibo Area)
- Karasabai Amerindian District (Upper Takutu-Upper Essequibo Area)
- Orealla Amerindian District (East Berbice-Corentyne Area)
- Orealla Amerindian Reservation (East Berbice-Corentyne Area)
- Pomeroon-Ituribisi Amerindian District (Pomeroon-Supenaam Area)
- Pomeroon-Ituribisi Indian Reservation (Pomeroon-Supenaam Area)
- Pomeroon-Ituribisi Reservation (Pomeroon-Supenaam Area)
- Saint Francis Amerindian District (Guyana Area)
- Santa Amerindian District (Essequibo Islands-West Demerara Area)
- Wikki Amerindian District (Upper Demerara-Berbice Area)
- Wikki Amerindian Reservation (Upper Demerara-Berbice Area)
- Wikki Indian Reservation (Upper Demerara-Berbice Area)

== See also ==
- Amerindian Heritage Month (Guyana)
- Category:Indigenous villages in Guyana
- Demographics of Guyana
- Umana Yana
