= Santa Mission =

Santa Mission Santa Aratak
- Village
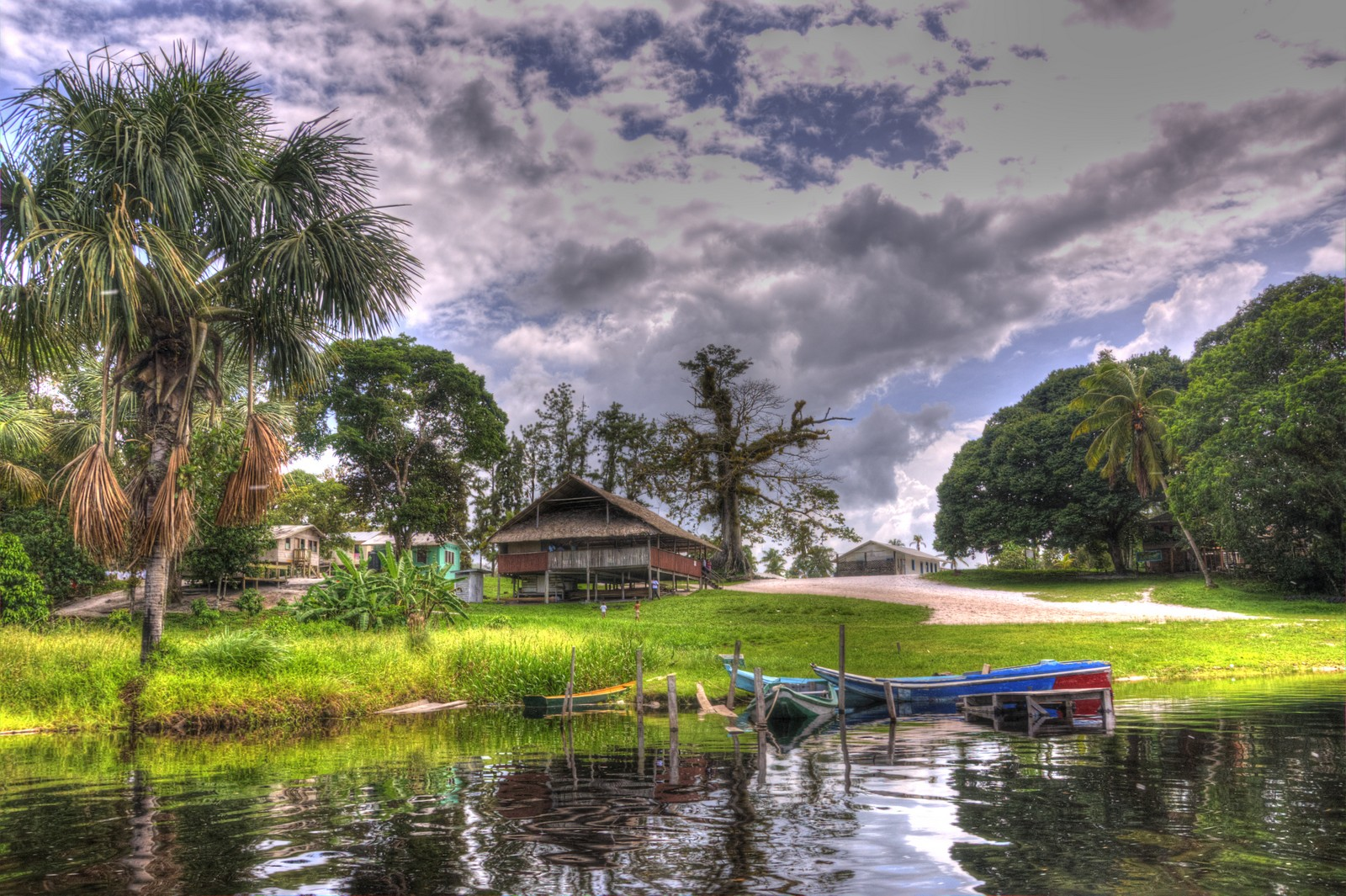

- Location in Guyana
- Coordinates: 6.5618°N 58.3304°W
- Country: Guyana
- Region: Essequibo Islands-West Demerara
- Settled: 1858

Government
  - Toshao: Hilton Williams

Area
  - Total: 220 km^{2} (84 sq mi)

Population (2012)
  - Total: 277

Santa Mission (also: Santa Aratak or Santa Aratack) is a village in the Essequibo Islands-West Demerara Region of Guyana. Santa Mission is mainly inhabited by Lokono Amerindians. The village is located on the Kamuni Creek, a tributary of the Demerara River. The village of Hopetown, an early Chinese settlement, is located about 15 kilometres (9.3 mi) from Santa Mission.

== Overview ==
Santa Mission was founded in 1858 by Alfred Patterson, a lumberjack who was looking for Wallaba trees (Eperua falcata). The village is built on white sand hills along the blackwater Kamuni Creek.

The economy of Santa Mission is based on tourism, craft making, and logging. The village has a Nursery and Primary school, a healthcare centre, and a local library. In 2008, the festivities of the Amerindian Heritage Month were held in Santa Mission. As of 2015, it was the only indigenous village in Essequibo Islands-West Demerara with titled land.

== Sights ==
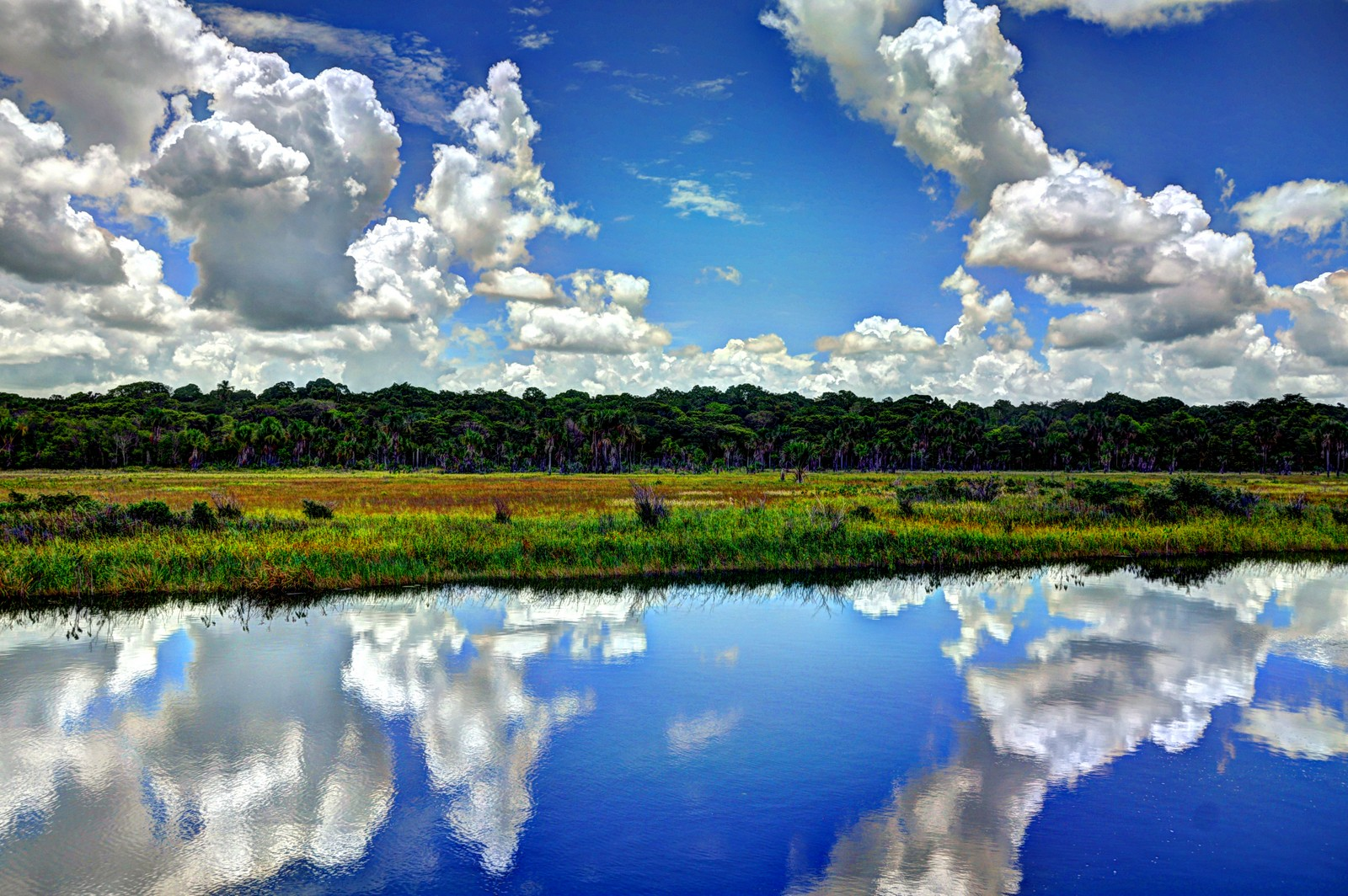
Savanna in Arrowpoint Nature Resort

Located on top of the hill is a giant silk-cotton tree. During the Dutch colonial era, the tree was used a navigation aid on the Demerara River. In the Lokono language, the tree is called Kamaka which means "mother of all trees." There is a village monument dedicated to the past toshaos (village chiefs) and a kamuni Women Craft shop. Near the village is the Arrowpoint Nature Resort, a privately owned tourist resort with its own nature reserve.

== Transport ==
Santa Mission does not have a connection to the road network and can only be accessed via the river. Arrowpoint Nature Resort operates a ferry service from Timehri (Cheddi Jagan International Airport) which makes a stop at Santa Mission. The journey will take between 45 minutes and one hour.

== Hopetown ==
In 1864, Chinese missionary O'Tye Kim petitioned the Court of Policy for a Chinese settlement. In 1865, Hopetown was founded on the Kamuni Creek and started with 25 settlers. The village was named Hopetown after Admiral James Hope who had visited the village. It is located at 6.53277°N 58.2808°W.

Hopetown flourished and peaked at 800 people in 1874. The economy was mainly based on charcoal production. When the demand dwindled, many Chinese moved to other towns. By 1914, about a third of the population was non-Chinese and there were only 46 Chinese left.
