= Arawak (disambiguation) =

The Arawak are an Indigenous people of South America and historically of the Caribbean.

Arawak may also refer to:

- Lokono, or Arawak, an Indigenous people of South America and originators of the name "Arawak"
  - Arawak language, or Lokono, the language of the Lokono
- Taíno, an Arawakan people of the northern Caribbean
  - Taíno language, the Arawakan languages of the Taíno people
- Arawakan languages, an indigenous language family of South America and the Caribbean
