= St. Cuthbert's Mission =

St. Cuthbert's Mission Pakuri
- Amerindian settlement
- Location in Guyana
- Coordinates: 6°22′N 58°4′W
- Country: Guyana
- Region: Demerara-Mahaica (Region 4)
- Established: Late nineteenth-century
- Founder: Joseph Ferguson

Government
  - Toshao: Timothy Andrews (2021–)

Area
  - Total: 621.60 km^{2} (240.00 sq mi)

Population (2013)
  - Total: 1,700
  - Density: 2.7/km^{2} (7.0/sq mi)
- Time zone: UTC-4

St. Cuthbert's Mission (Lokono: Pakuri) is an Amerindian village on the Mahaica River in the Demerara-Mahaica region (Region 4) of Guyana. It comprises approximately 200 households. St. Cuthbert's is regarded by many people in Guyana as the "cultural capital" for Amerindians.

== History ==
St. Cuthbert's Mission was founded in the late 1800s by Joseph Ferguson, who was also the village's first Kafotay (chief in the Lokono language). At that time it was named "Pakuri" after the Platonia tree that was then plentiful in the area. The village was renamed St. Cuthbert's Mission when the first Anglican missionaries arrived and founded a Mission there on Saint Cuthbert's Day in 1889.

In February 2011, St. Cuthbert's was hit by a major flood, with levels of accumulated water reaching 311.3 millimetres. The flood resulted in substantial loss of crops and personal property for many villagers. In September 2011, St. Cuthbert's hosted celebrations for Amerindian Heritage Month. The celebrations were attended by a number of senior government officials and thousands of visitors from Guyana and abroad.

== Geography ==
St. Cuthbert's Mission is situated on the left bank of the Mahaica River. It is surrounded by savannah and shrub lands on its east side, and dense vegetation on its west side. The nearest large settlements are the capital city, Georgetown (57 miles away) and Mahaica (65 miles away by river).

== Government ==
St. Cuthbert's Mission falls under the jurisdiction of the Region 4 (Demerara-Mahaica). However, one quarter of St. Cuthbert's titled communal village lands are in Region 5 (Mahaica-Berbice), with the other three quarters lying in Region 4.

Like most other Amerindian villages in Guyana (and in accordance with the constitutional Amerindian Act), St. Cuthbert's is governed by a Village Council under the leadership of a Toshao (or Chief). Toshaos are elected every three years, and are voted in by the local population in village elections. The council is made up of nine members, including the Toshao and an appointed secretary and treasurer. Village Council meetings are held monthly, on the last Saturday of every month.

== Economy ==
St. Cuthbert's was primarily a logging community, and logging provides one of the source of income for the village. Since the 1990s, a small number of villagers have found work with Omai Gold Mines Ltd. A few villagers also practice subsistence farming.

The Toshao (chief) receives a monthly stipend from the national government.

== Culture ==
=== Local art and the Lokono Group ===
In August 1988, the leading Guyanese artist and native of St. Cuthbert's Mission, George Simon, founded a drawing and design workshop in the village. The workshop fostered a number of Lokono artistic talents in the village who have since achieved artistic recognition in their own right, including Oswald ("Ossie") Hussein, Foster Simon, Roland Taylor, Telford Taylor and Lynus Clenkian. These artists - including George Simon - are known collectively as the Lokono Artists Group. In 2002, Simon constructed an Arts Centre to allow local artists to exhibit their work. The Arts Centre was opened in September 2002.

== Notable people ==
- Shakira Caine (1947), actress and fashion model
- George Simon (1947–2020), artist and archaeologist.
- Oswald Hussein (1954), artist.
- Lenox Shuman (1973), politician.
