= Demographics of Guyana =

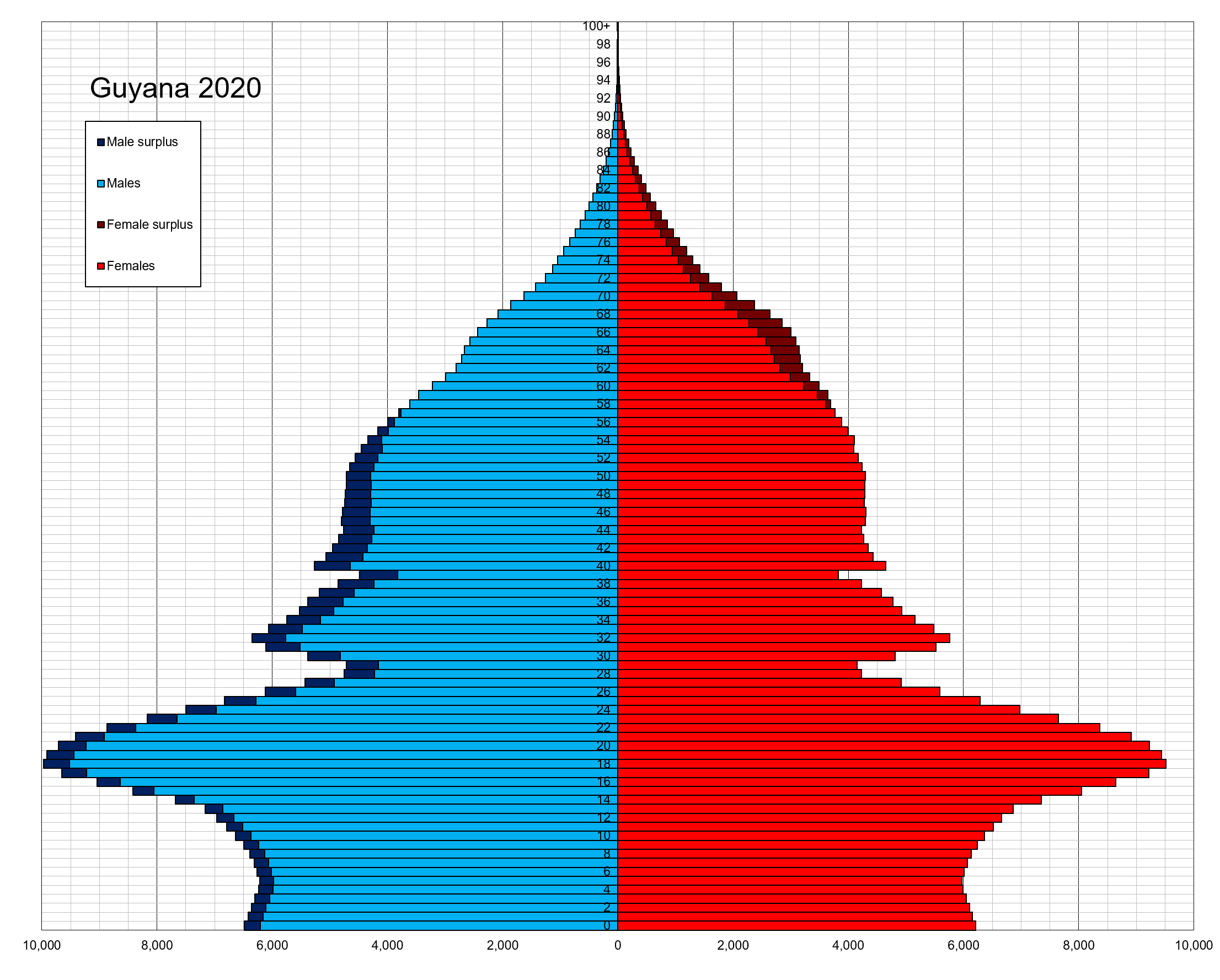
- Population pyramid of Guyana in 2020
- Population: 789,683 (2022 est.)
- Growth rate: 0.24% (2022 est.)
- Birth rate: 16.72 births/1,000 population (2022 est.)
- Death rate: 6.91 deaths/1,000 population (2022 est.)
- Fertility rate: 2.35 children
- Net migration rate: -7.42 migrant(s)/1,000 population (2022 est.)
- Immigrant share: 6.5% (2024)

Age structure
- 0–14 years: 23.91%
- 65 and over: 7.01%

Nationality
- Nationality: Guyanese

Language
- Official: English
- Spoken: Guyanese Creole

Census population
Year	Pop.	±% p.a.
1831	98,000	—
1911	296,041	+1.39%
1931	310,933	+0.25%
1946	375,701	+1.27%
1960	560,330	+2.90%
1970	701,718	+2.28%
1980	759,567	+0.80%
1991	723,673	−0.44%
2002	751,223	+0.34%
2012	746,955	−0.06%
2022	878,674	+1.64%

This is a demography of Guyana including population density, ethnicity, education level, health of the populace, economic status, religious affiliations and other aspects of the population.

Guyana's population (Guyanese people) is made up of five main ethnic groups: Indians, Africans, Amerindians, Europeans (mainly Portuguese), and Chinese. Ninety percent of the inhabitants live on the narrow coastal plain, where population density is more than 115 inhabitants per square kilometre (300/sq mi). The population density for Guyana as a whole is low: less than four inhabitants per square kilometre (10.4/sq mi).

Guyana continues to be influenced by British and Indian culture as well as the cultures of the United States, Europe, Africa, the Islamic world, East and South Asian countries, and Latin America, especially the neighbouring countries of Venezuela and Brazil. It is one of two countries and three territories to form the Guianas, along with Suriname, the overseas territory of French Guiana, the Venezuelan region of Guayana, and Amapá in Brazil.

== Population ==
According to the 2022 revision of the World Population Prospects, the total population was 804,567 in 2021. The proportion of children below the age of 15 in 2010 was 33.6%, 62.1% was between 15 and 65 years of age, while 4.3% was 65 years or older.

Year	Total population ( × 1000)	Population percentage in age bracket		
Year	Total population ( × 1000)	aged 0–14	aged 15–64	aged 65+
1950	407	39.9%	56.0%	4.1%
1955	483	43.6%	52.8%	3.6%
1960	560	46.3%	50.4%	3.3%
1965	640	47.7%	49.0%	3.4%
1970	721	48.7%	47.9%	3.4%
1975	749	45.5%	50.9%	3.6%
1980	777	42.5%	53.7%	3.8%
1985	752	38.6%	57.0%	4.4%
1990	725	34.4%	60.6%	5.0%
1995	728	34.6%	60.4%	5.0%
2000	733	35.5%	60.0%	4.5%
2005	746	36.9%	59.3%	3.8%
2010	754	33.6%	62.1%	4.3%
2020	750	23.9%	69.1%	7.0%

=== Structure of the population ===
Population by Sex and Age Group (Census 15.IX.2012):

Age group	Male	Female	Total	%
Total	371 805	375 150	746 955	100
0–4	35 876	34 564	70 440	9.43
5–9	35 954	35 314	71 268	9.54
10–14	42 302	40 837	83 139	11.13
15–19	42 749	42 049	84 798	11.35
20–24	31 350	31 932	63 282	8.47
25–29	25 487	26 574	52 061	6.97
30–34	26 103	26 996	53 099	7.11
35–39	25 457	26 022	51 479	6.89
40–44	24 212	23 743	47 955	6.42
45–49	21 573	21 542	43 115	5.77
50–54	18 878	18 566	37 444	5.01
55–59	14 045	14 998	29 043	3.89
60–64	10 479	11 034	21 513	2.88
65-69	6 638	7 197	13 835	1.85
70-74	4 817	5 522	10 339	1.38
75-79	3 037	3 871	6 908	0.92
80-84	1 714	2 365	4 079	0.55
85+	1 134	2 024	3 158	0.42
Age group	Male	Female	Total	Percent
0–14	114 132	110 715	224 847	30.10
15–64	240 333	243 456	483 789	64.77
65+	17 340	20 979	38 319	5.13

=== Age structure ===
0–14 years: 35.6% (male 135,629; female 131,518; total 267,146)
15–64 years: 60.2% (male 226,058; female 226,551; total 452,609)
65 years and over: 4.2% (male 14,347; female 17,120; total 31,467) (2002 census)

== Vital statistics ==
=== UN estimates ===
The Population Department of the United Nations prepared the following estimates of vital statistics of Guyana.

Period	Live births per year	Deaths per year	Natural change per year	CBR*	CDR*	NC*	TFR*	IMR*	Life expectancy		
Period	Live births per year	Deaths per year	Natural change per year	CBR*	CDR*	NC*	TFR*	IMR*	total	males	females
1950–1955	20,000	8,000	12,000	49.4	18.1	31.4	6.68	118	49.2	46.5	52.0
1955–1960	23,000	8,000	15,000	47.5	15.8	31.7	6.77	107	51.7	49.4	54.1
1960–1965	25,000	8,000	17,000	41.5	13.6	27.9	6.15	98	53.7	51.8	55.6
1965–1970	27,000	8,000	19,000	40.0	12.5	27.5	6.11	92	55.1	53.8	56.4
1970–1975	25,000	7,000	18,000	34.1	11.0	23.2	4.90	83	57.2	55.9	58.6
1975–1980	24,000	7,000	17,000	31.1	10.0	21.0	3.94	77	58.8	57.4	60.3
1980–1985	23,000	7,000	16,000	28.7	9.6	19.1	3.26	73	60.0	57.9	62.5
1985–1990	19,000	7,000	12,000	26.4	9.8	16.6	2.70	68	60.6	57.9	63.8
1990–1995	19,000	7,000	12,000	23.5	9.8	13.7	2.55	63	61.4	58.5	64.9
1995–2000	18,000	7,000	11,000	22.0	8.9	13.0	2.50	56	63.1	60.1	66.6
2000–2005	16,000	7,000	9,000	20.1	7.6	12.5	2.43	49	65.7	62.7	69.1
2005–2010	14,000	6,000	8,000	18.8	5.9	12.9	2.33	42	68.7	65.5	71.9
*CBR = crude birth rate (per 1000); CDR = crude death rate (per 1000); NC = natural change (per 1000); IMR = infant mortality rate per 1000 births; TFR = total fertility rate (number of children per woman)

=== Registered births and deaths ===
	Population	Live births	Deaths	Natural change	Crude birth rate (per 1000)	Crude death rate (per 1000)	Natural change (per 1000)	Total fertility rate	Infant mortality rate
1932		10 825	6 694	4 131					
1933		10 461	7 848	2 613					
1934		9 301	7 980	1 321					
1935		11 262	6 762	4 500					
1936		11 736	6 800	4 936					
1937		11 227	7 367	3 860					
1938		10 016	8 704	1 312					
1939		9 599	6 728	2 871					
1940		12 033	6 397	5 636					
1941		12 530	5 517	7 013					
1942		13 835	6 233	7 602					
1943		12 204	8 991	3 213					
1944		10 512	8 060	2 452					
1945		13 542	6 632	6 910					
1946		13 429	5 895	7 534					
1947		15 209	5 713	9 496					
1948		16 576	5 437	11 139					
1949		17 137	5 264	11 873					
1950		16 985	5 938	11 047					
1951		18 357	5 637	12 720					
1952		19 555	5 772	13 783					
1953		20 148	5 876	14 272					
1954		20 263	5 635	14 628					
1955		21 073	5 557	15 516					
1956		21 668	5 380	16 288					
1957		22 983	5 726	17 257					
1958		23 661	5 195	18 466					
1959		24 467	5 313	19 154					
1960		23 718	5 167	18 551					
1961		24 323	5 069	19 254					
1962		25 316	4 664	20 652					
1963		25 796	4 573	21 223					
1964		25 541	4 748	20 793					
1965		25 830	4 705	21 125					
1966		26 348	5 234	21 114					
1967		23 335	5 388	17 947					
1968		23 467	5 619	17 848					
1969		22 129							
1970		23 703	4 808	18 895					
1971		22 933	5 248	17 685					
1972		25 065	5 962	19 103					
1973		24 100	5 599	18 501					
1974		23 100	6 161	16 939					
1975		23 200	5 924	17 276					
1976		24 200	6 251	16 949					
1977			5 883						
1978		23 200	6 000	17 200					
1984			4 781						
1992	712 415								
1993	734 854		4 514			6.1			
1994	745 994		4 304			5.8			
1995	760 379								
1996	770 139								
1997	775 137		5 117			6.6			
1998	773 432		4 977			6.4			
1999	770 584		4 197			5.4			
2000	756 395								
2001	753 862		4 629			6.1			
2002	751 647		5 003			6.7			
2003	749 739		4 986			6.7			
2004	748 144		5 141			6.9			
2005	746 865	14 860	5 230	9 630	19.9	7.0	12.9		22.0
2006	745 898	14 830	5 020	9 810	19.9	6.7	13.2		19.2
2007	745 246	14 500	5 040	9 460	19.5	6.8	12.7		20.3
2008	774 443	15 240	4 980	10 260	19.7	6.4	13.2		17.5
2009	753 227	14 461	5 270	9 191	19.2	7.0	12.2		10.8
2010	752 113	14 290	5 260	9 030	19.0	7.0	12.0		14.7
2011	750 663	14 110	5 180	8 930	18.8	6.9	11.9		14.4
2012	746 724	13 780	5 160	8 620	18.5	6.9	11.5		13.8
2013	742 007	15 806	5 195	10 611	21.3	7.0	14.3	2.6	12.9
2014	736 609	15 715	5 268	10 447	21.3	7.2	14.1	2.6	23.3
2015	738 592	16 727	4 922	11 805	21.7	6.7	15.0	2.71	21.8
2016	746 374	15 896	5 109	10 787	20.6	6.8	13.8	2.6	
2017	759 134	15 248	4 909	10 339	19.1	6.5	12.6	2.46	
2018	790 948	15 749	4 558	11 191	18.5	5.8	12.7	2.33	
2019	837 954	16 216	5 560	10 656	19.0	6.6	12.4	2.19	
2020	859 834	15 860	3 503	12 357	17.9	4.1	13.8	2.06	
2021	873 924	15 446	7 154	8 292	17.3	8.2	9.1	1.97	
2022	895 608	15 154	6 818	8 336	17.6	7.6	10.0	1.89	
2023	918,083	14 730	5 942	8 788	16.1	6.5	9.6	1.77	
2024	956,044	12 832	6 375	6 457	13.4	6.7	6.7	1.49	
2025	1,025,334	13 132	5 777	7 355	12.8	5.6	7.2	1.41	

=== Demographic and Health Surveys ===
Total Fertility Rate (TFR), Wanted Fertility Rate (WFR) and Crude Birth Rate (CBR):

Year	Total			Urban			Rural		
Year	CBR	TFR	WFR	CBR	TFR	WFR	CBR	TFR	WFR
2005	21.3	2.6	—N/a	20.3	2.4	—N/a	21.7	2.8	—N/a
2009	23	2.8	2.1	17	2.1	1.7	24	3.0	2.3

== Ethnic groups ==
Ethnic groups of Guyana (2012 Census)
Ethnic groups	percent
Indian	39.83%
Black	29.25%
Mixed	19.88%
Amerindian	10.51%
Other (includes Chinese, European)	0.5%

The present population of Guyana is racially and ethnically heterogeneous, with ethnic groups originating from India, Africa, Europe, and China, as well as indigenous or aboriginal peoples.

The largest ethnic group are the Indo-Guyanese, the descendants of indentured labourers from India, who make up 39.8% of the population, according to the 2012 census. They are followed by the Afro-Guyanese, the descendants of enslaved labourers from Africa, who constitute 29.3%. Guyanese of mixed heritage make up 19.9%.

Indigenous peoples, known locally as Amerindians, make up 10.5%. The Indigenous groups include the Lokono, the Wai Wai, the Caribs, the Akawaio, the Arecuna, the Patamona, the Wapixana, the Macushi, and the Warao. The two largest groups, the Indo-Guyanese and Afro-Guyanese, have experienced some racial tension.

Most Indo-Guyanese are descended from indentured labourers who migrated from North India, especially the Bhojpur and Awadh regions of the Hindi Belt in the present day states of Uttar Pradesh, Bihar and Jharkhand. A significant minority of Indo-Guyanese are also descended from indentured migrants who came from the South Indian states of Tamil Nadu and Andhra Pradesh. Among the immigrants there were many labourers from other parts of South Asia such as Nepal, Bengal, Chota Nagpur, and Northwestern India - the modern states of Punjab, Haryana - which was at the time a part of the state of Uttar Pradesh and Rajasthan.

The distribution pattern in the 2002 census was similar to those of the 1980 and 1991 censuses, but the share of the two main groups has declined. Indo-Guyanese made up 51.9% of the total population in 1980, but by 1991 this had fallen to 48.6%, and then to 43.5% in the 2002 census. Those of African descent increased slightly from 30.8% to 32.3% during the first period (1980 and 1991) before falling to 30.2% in the 2002 census. With small growth in the overall population, the decline in the shares of the two larger groups has resulted in the relative increase of shares of the multiracial and Amerindian groups.

The Amerindian population rose by 22,097 people between 1991 and 2002. This represents an increase of 47.3% or annual growth of 3.5%. Similarly, the multiracial population increased by 37,788 persons, representing a 43.0% increase or annual growth rate of 3.2% from the base period of 1991 census.

The number of Chinese is about 0.2% and the White population (mostly consisting of Portuguese) is about 0.3%.

Population of Guyana according to ethnic group
Census year	Indian		Black		Mixed		Amerindian		White		Chinese		Other		Total
Census year	#	%	#	%	#	%	#	%	#	%	#	%	#	%	Total
1946	163,434	43.5%	143,385	38.2%	37,685	10.0%	16,322	4.3%	8,543	2.3%	3,567	0.9%	2,765	0.7%	375,701
1960	267,840	47.8%	183,980	32.8%	67,189	12.0%	25.450	4.5%	3,218	0.6%	4,074	0.7%	8,655	1.5%	560,406
1980	394,417	51.9%	234,094	30.8%	84,764	11.2%	40,343	5.3%	3,790	0.5%	1,864	0.2%	294	0.0%	759,566
1991	351,939	48.6%	233,465	32.3%	87,881	12.1%	46,722	6.5%	2,267	0.3%	1,290	0.2%	107	0.0%	723,671
2002	326,277	43.4%	227,062	30.2%	125,727	16.7%	68,675	9.1%	1,974	0.3%	1,396	0.2%	112	0.0%	751,223
2012	297,493	39.8%	218,483	29.3%	148,532	19.9%	78,492	10.5%	2,325	0.3%	1,377	0.2%	253	0.0%	746,955

== Language ==
English is the official language of Guyana, which is the only South American country with English as the official language.

Guyanese Creole (an English-based creole with African and Indian syntax) is widely spoken in Guyana.

A number of Amerindian languages are also spoken by a minority of the population. These include Cariban languages such as Macushi, Akawaio and Wai-Wai, and Arawakan languages such as Lokono and Wapishana.

Other languages include Chinese spoken by some members of the Chinese community, Portuguese spoken by some Portuguese Guyanese, Dutch spoken by Surinamese in Guyana, and Guyanese Hindustani and Tamil spoken by a few older members of the Indian Guyanese community, as well as Sarnami Hindustani spoken by Indians from Suriname.

=== Second and third languages ===
Portuguese is increasingly widely used as a second language in Guyana, particularly in the south of the country near the Brazil border. Dutch and French are spoken by those who frequently visit neighbouring Suriname and French Guiana respectively. French is widely taught in secondary schools along with Spanish as foreign languages. Spanish is also used by a minority of the population as a second language. Spanish is spoken typically by visitors and residents from Venezuela.

== Religion ==
The religious breakdown of Guyanese people is: Hindu 28.4%, Pentecostal 16.9%, Roman Catholic 8.1%, Muslim 7.2%, Anglican 6.9%, Seventh-day Adventist 5%, other Christian denominations 20.5%, no religion 4.3%, Rastafarian 0.5%, Bahá’í 0.1%, other faiths 2.2%.
