= George Simon (artist) =

Guyanese artist and archaeologist (1947–2020)

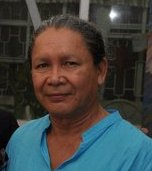
- Born: 23 April 1947; St. Cuthbert's Mission, British Guiana (now Guyana)
- Died: 15 July 2020 (aged 73); Canary Islands, Spain
- Citizenship: Guyanese
- Education: University of Portsmouth (BA in Fine Art); University College London (MA in Field and Analytical Techniques in Archaeology)
- Occupations: Artist; archaeologist; lecturer
- Known for: His paintings, the Berbice Archaeology Project, founding the Lokono Artists Group
- Notable work: Universal Woman (2008); Palace of the Peacock: Homage to Wilson Harris (2009)
- Awards: Golden Arrow of Achievement (1998); Anthony N. Sabga Caribbean Award for Excellence (2012)

George Simon (23 April 1947 – 15 July 2020) was a Guyanese Lokono Arawak artist and archaeologist. He was the founder and mentor of the Lokono Artists Group, a group of Lokono artists from Guyana, based primarily in his hometown of St. Cuthbert's Mission. Simon was widely regarded as one of the leading Guyanese artists of his generation, and his paintings (acrylic on canvas, paper or twill fabric) are notable for their explorations of Amerindian culture and the Guyanese environment. He was also recognized for his achievements as an educator, his efforts to develop opportunities for Amerindian artists in Guyana, and for his work as an archaeologist.

== Life ==
=== Early years ===
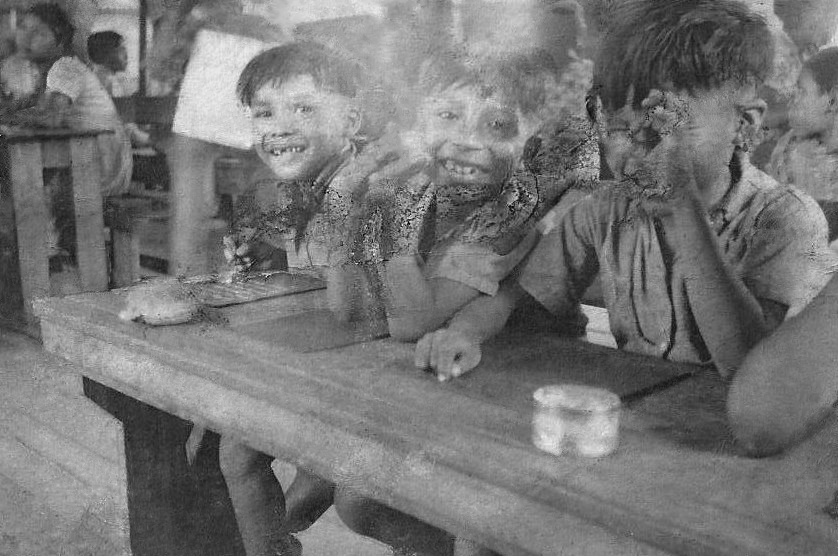
Simon (far left) at school in St. Cuthbert's Mission

George Simon was born on 23 April 1947 to Olive and Mark Simon in St. Cuthbert's Mission on the Mahaica River in British Guiana (now Guyana). His father was a woodcutter, and his mother was a housewife. Simon attended school at St Cuthbert's Mission up until the age of 12. Discussing his early years in an interview from 1994/5, Simon recalled the way in which the Mission school stifled expressions of Amerindian culture: "Anyone found speaking Arawak in class was flogged [...] In general, Amerindian culture was discouraged and we were made to feel inferior".

When he was 12 years old, Simon was adopted by James William Pink – an English Anglican priest who was serving in the Mahaica-Berbice region at that time. Simon subsequently moved with his foster-father to Linden and then to Georgetown, where he studied English, Mathematics, Geography, Hygiene, Physiology and Art at Christ Church Secondary School.

=== England ===
In 1970, Simon and his foster-father moved to Essex, England. From 1972 to 1974, Simon studied A-level Art at Thurrock and Basildon College in Grays, Essex. In 1975, he enrolled at the University of Portsmouth, where he studied for a BA degree in fine art, with a special focus on art history and 19th-century art. He graduated with honours in 1978.

=== Guyana ===
In 1978, Simon returned to Guyana and began working as a lecturer in art at the Burrowes School of Art, and then at the University of Guyana. During this time, Simon formed a close friendship with the Guyanese archaeologist, anthropologist and novelist Denis Williams, and in 1985 Williams invited Simon to work as his research assistant at the Walter Roth Museum of Anthropology. Simon worked at the Walter Roth Museum until 1992, and it was during this time that he began his training in archaeology and anthropology, under the tutelage of Williams.

As part of his work at the Walter Roth Museum, Simon took part in numerous anthropological expeditions to various parts of Guyana. These expeditions had a profound impact on his life and his artistic development. Shortly after joining the Walter Roth Museum, he was asked to lead an expedition to a Wai-Wai community in the south of Guyana. The expedition stayed at the Wai-Wai village of Sheparyimo for a month, conducting anthropological work among the community. Simon produced a number of sketches of Wai-Wai peoples, architecture and artifacts during his visit to Sheparyimo, and his experiences there provided the inspiration for a collection of paintings entitled the Wai-Wai Series. Many of the expeditions in which he took part involved journeys on the Essequibo River, and his fascination with that river resulted in his Essequibo Series.

Speaking of his experience in Sheparyimo some years later in an interview with the art critic and historian Anne Walmsley, Simon reflected: "This was my first experience of being in the Amazon and of being with the indigenous peoples of the Amazonas, from whom I could draw parallels with my own early life". He also spoke more generally of the way in which all of the expeditions in which he took part transformed his perspective and particularly his relationship to Amerindian culture in Guyana. He explained that prior to this period he had traveled very little in Guyana, and had felt "partially cut off from [his] people and that kind of life" due to the time that he had spent in England. His work at the Walter Roth Museum, therefore, enabled him to be "reunited with [his] people" and to explore his "Amerindianness".

==== Lokono Artists Group ====
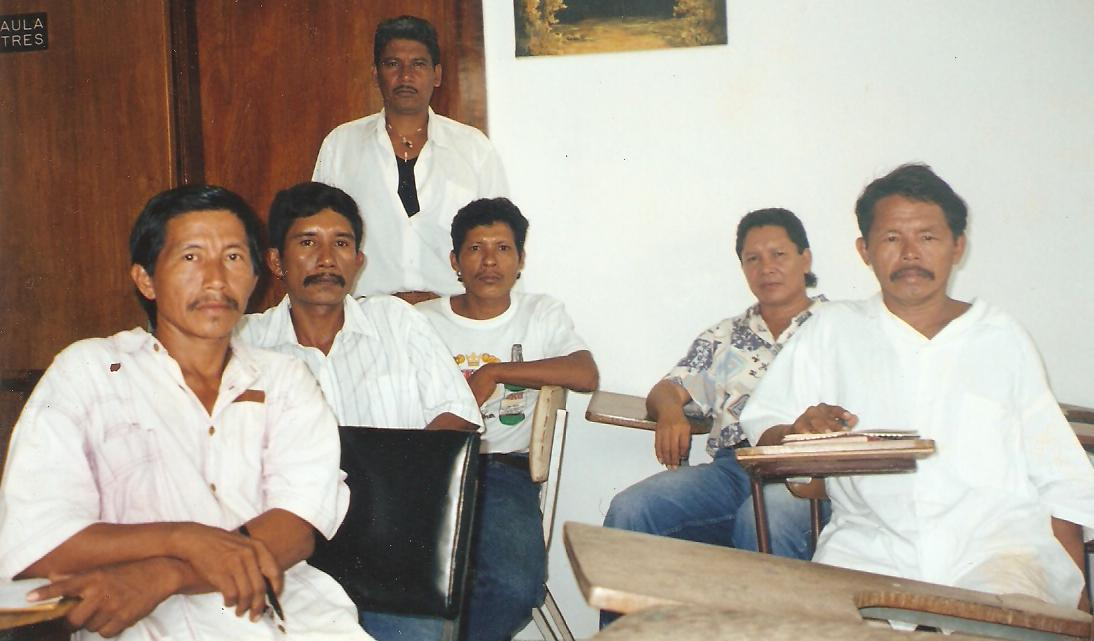
Simon with members of the Lokono Artists Group. Left to Right: "Puffy" Clenkien, Telford Taylor, Ossie Hussein (standing), Foster Simon, George Simon and Lynus Clenkien

During these years, Simon also worked hard to improve the training and development opportunities for Amerindian artists in Guyana. Concerned about Amerindians from his village "not going very far in their education", he founded a drawing and design workshop in St Cuthbert's mission in August 1988. The workshop fostered a number of artistic talents who have since achieved artistic recognition in their own right, including Oswald ("Ossie") Hussein, Roaland Taylor and Lynus Clenkien. These artists – including Simon – are known collectively as the Lokono Artists Group.

In February 1991, Simon organised an exhibition of his own work along with the work of nine other artists from the Lokono Artists Group at the Hadfield Foundation. The exhibition was entitled Contemporary Amerindian Art. According to University of Guyana lecturer Alim Hosein, the exhibition constituted a "ground shift in Guyanese art": "The exhibition [...] broke all boundaries and all conceptions of Amerindian art in Guyana, and indeed made the serious claim that there was such a thing as 'Amerindian art,' a claim which was based on far more than the appearance of Amerindian motifs in artwork by persons of Amerindian descent. The abundance of excellent work, the new visual imagination and the sheer number of artists [...] from this small population of Guyanese, introduced the Amerindians as a serious force in local art and added a new dimension to it at a time when expressions by other artists were scarce". Contemporary Amerindian Art launched a tradition of exhibitions of Amerindian art that are organised most years as part of Amerindian Heritage Month.

=== Further study in England ===
In 1992, Simon returned to England to study for an MA degree in Field and Analytical Techniques in Archaeology at University College London. He completed the MA in 1994, when he returned to Guyana.

=== Travels in Chad, France, Canada, and Haiti ===
In December 1998, Simon left Guyana and embarked on a series of journeys that would last until 2002. On leaving Guyana, he first moved to Chad in Africa, where he worked with the United States Embassy Public Affairs Department's Language Centre. During this time, he worked with a group of Chadian artists to found an art studio and gallery in N'Djamena called the House of African Art. Simon together with the artists organised an exhibition at the gallery of their art work, in 1999. Simon also worked as manager for a local musical group, H'Sao, who won a bronze medal at the Jeux de la Francophonie in Quebec, Canada, in July 2001.

In 2001, Simon moved to France to take up the position of artist-in-residence at the Galerie Epices et Arts (Arts and Spices Gallery) in Lyon. The gallery staged an exhibition of his work in December of that year.

In 2002, Simon moved to Montreal in Canada. While in Canada, he organised a performance of Amerindian dancers and musicians as part of a Guyana Festival that was put on by the Guyanese Consulate in Toronto in May 2002.

In July 2002, Simon travelled to Haiti, where he set up a small school called Escola Nueva, teaching English, Art and Music. Although he did not stay in Haiti for long, his time there was artistically very productive because, in his words: "Haiti is full of vibrations; full of replicas of Amerindian heritage with museums dedicated to artefacts. It is buzzing with art displayed on the streets." Simon left Haiti and travelled back to Guyana in mid-August 2002.

=== Return to Guyana ===
On his return to Guyana, Simon took up a position as lecturer in art, archaeology and anthropology, and coordinator of the Amerindian Research Unit, at the University of Guyana. He also began work on the construction of an Arts Centre in his hometown of St. Cuthbert's Mission, which was opened in September 2002. The Arts Centre was designed to allow local artists to exhibit their work. In the same month, Simon took part in an exhibition of Amerindian art at Castellani House (the home of Guyana's National Art Gallery) entitled Moving Circle.

==== The Berbice Archaeology Project ====
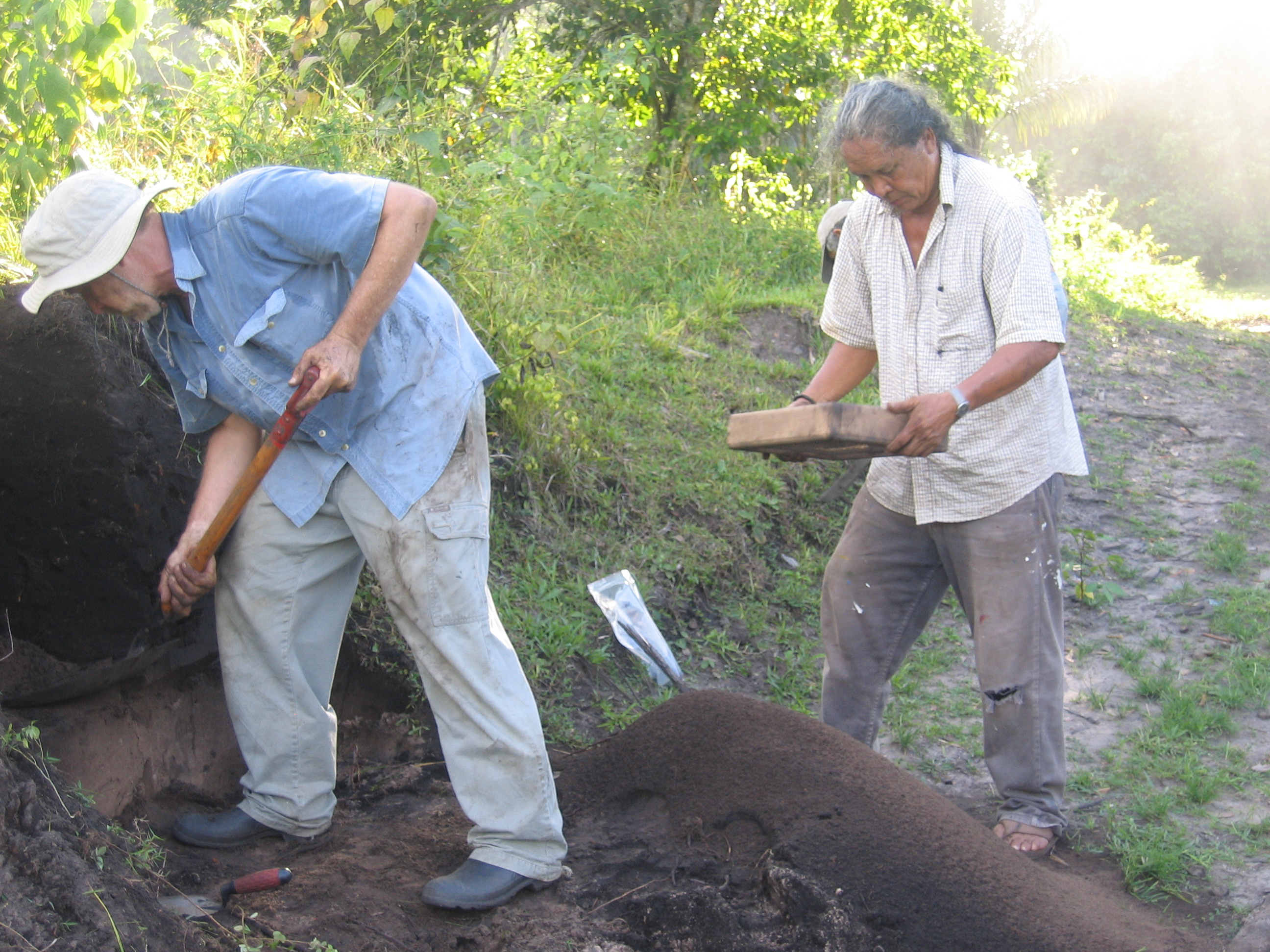
Simon at work on the Berbice Archaeology Project, 2009.

In 2009, Simon began working on a major archaeological project in the Berbice region of Guyana with Neil L. Whitehead at the University of Wisconsin-Madison and Michael Heckenberger at the University of Florida. Aimed at investigating the remains of ancient settlements and agricultural networks in the Berbice region, the project had its origins in an initial sighting of numerous small mounds by retired Major-General Joe Singh, during one of his flights to the Guyana Defence Force Battle School at Takama. Singh's initial observations were pursued by Simon, who discovered terra preta soils (evidence of human inhabitance) in the area in 1987. In 1992, Whitehead and Simon revisited the sites and undertook preliminary field investigations of cultural and geological remains in the area. These investigations uncovered a "vast complex of agricultural mounds in the area" and a large terra preta site named Hitia. Initial radiocarbon tests of samples taken from the site places the construction of the agricultural mounds at approximately 1800BP.

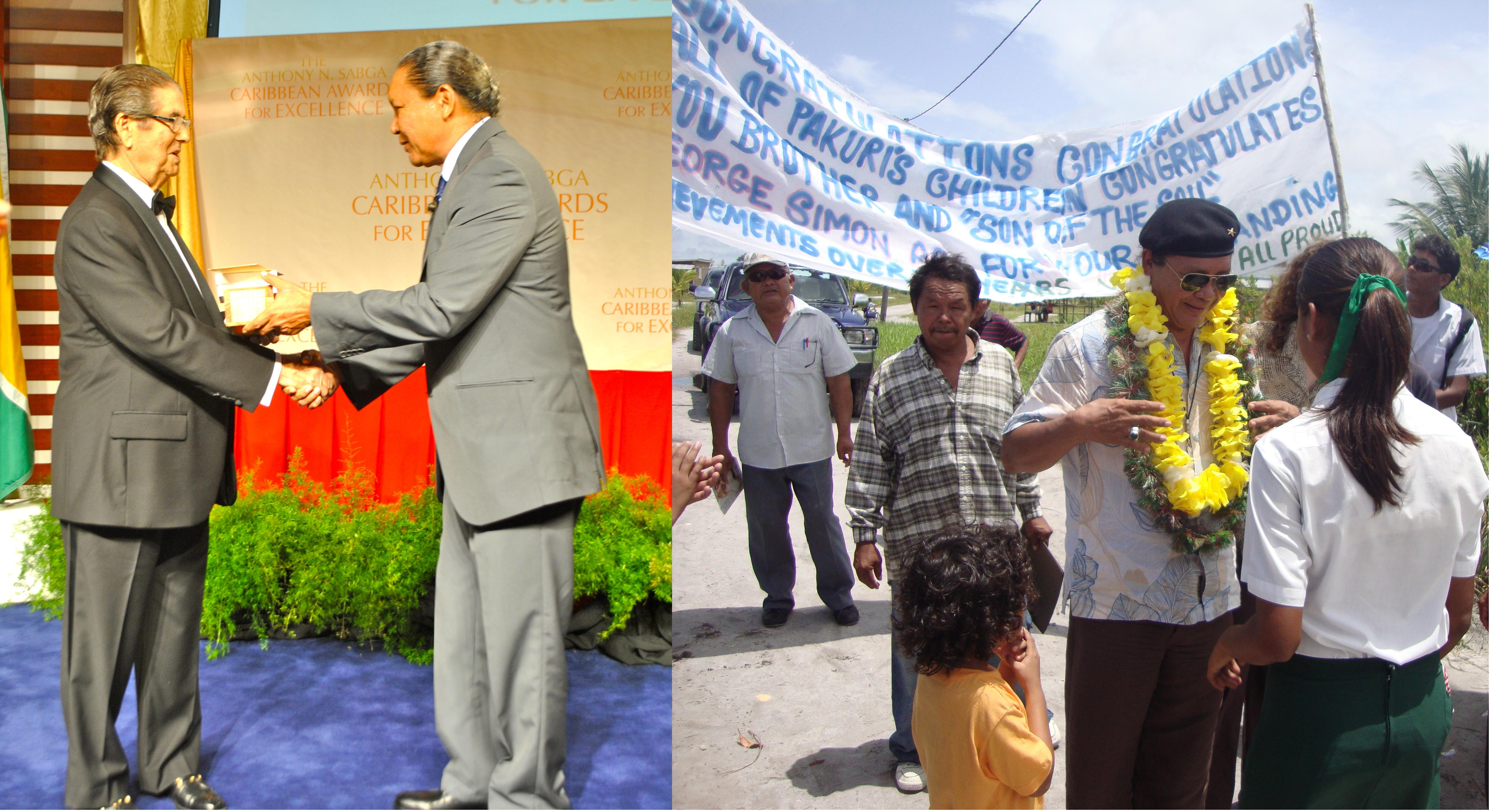
The Anthony N. Sabga Award: (left to right) Simon receiving the award on 5 May 2012; celebrations in honour of Simon and his award held at his hometown of St. Cuthbert's Mission on 11 May 2012.

In 2009, Simon, Whitehead, Heckenberger and David Steadman (curator at the Florida Museum of Natural History) undertook a pilot archaeological study of four occupation sites along the Berbice River. Testing of ceramic and organic materials from the sites gave a radiocarbon date of ca. 5000BP (3,000 years BCE). These dates placed the materials among the oldest recovered in the greater Amazonia region. As such, Whitehead explained that the Berbice Archaeology Project (ongoing) promised to "substantially change" current understanding of "long-term human occupation in the tropics, and particularly the important role that Arawakan peoples may have played in that process". Michael Mansoor, chairman of the ANSA Awards' Eminent Persons Panel, said that the project "might cause history books about the pre-Columbian past of the Americas to be radically rewritten".

=== Recognition ===
Simon was awarded Guyana's Golden Arrow of Achievement in 1998. In May 2012, he was awarded the Anthony N. Sabga Caribbean Award for Excellence for his work as an artist and an archaeologist.

== Death ==
Simon died from cancer in Spain on 15 July 2020, aged 73.

== Art ==
=== Style and technique ===
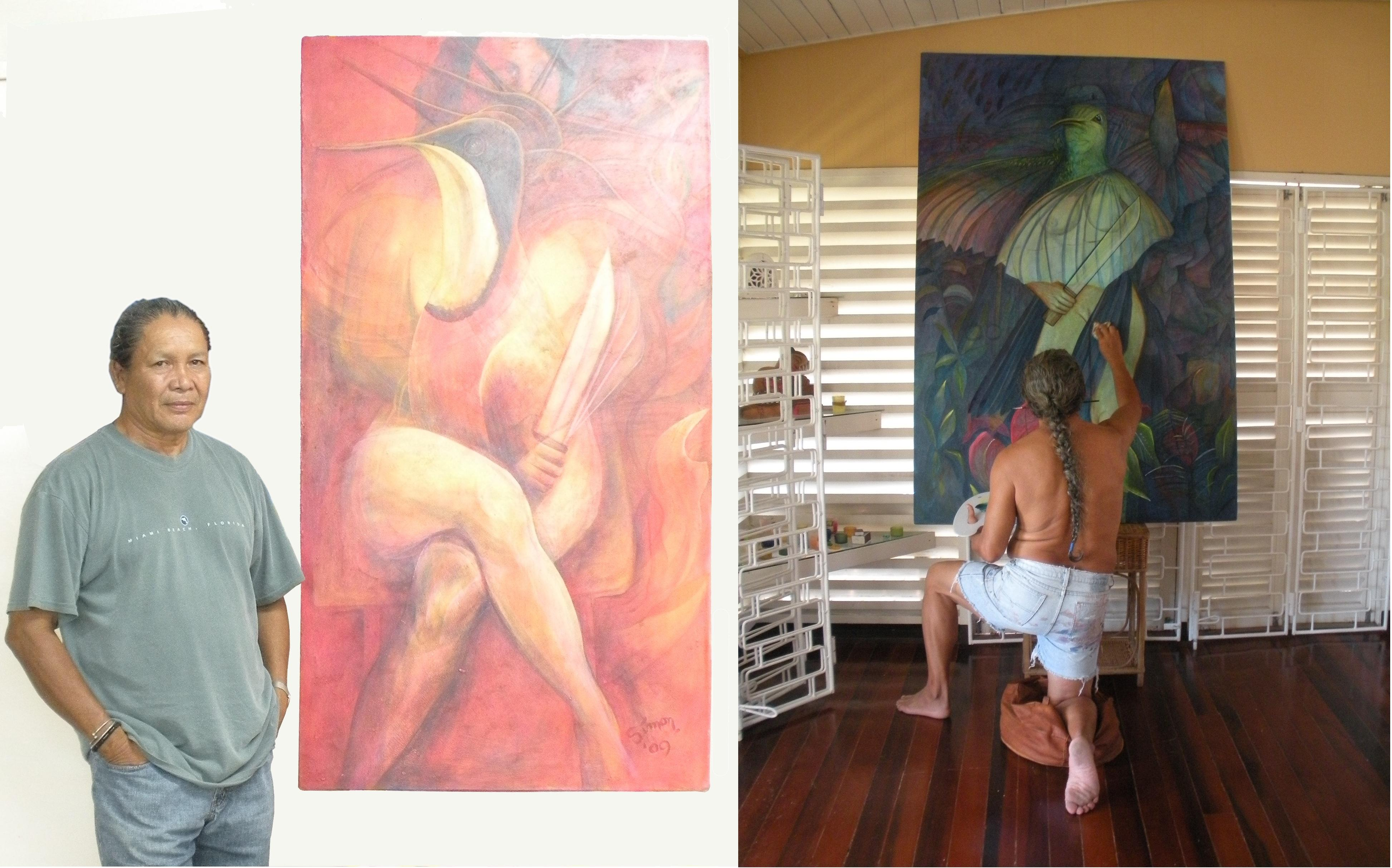
Simon and the Bimichi paintings (2009): (left to right) Simon with his painting Bimichi I; Simon working on Bimichi II.

Simon painted primarily with acrylics on canvas, twill fabric, or paper. He built contrasts and depth into his paintings by applying thin layers of acrylic, one on top of the other, "very gently and very tediously". In the late 1990s, he started to experiment with the use of gesso in order to create texture and three-dimensional patterns of relief in his paintings.

Conceptually, Simon deployed an intuitive approach to his paintings. He often began by deciding on a dominant colour for his work, "throw[ing] paint haphazardly" at the canvas, and then responded to "imagery [that] comes up". In 1994/95, Simon explained: "I have great faith in the subconscious. So I would let the paint remain on the canvas and look at it and gradually images come out and I would develop those images".

According to Simon, his archaeological work had a profound effect on his artistic style. His research into prehistoric art in South America and Latin America encouraged him "to look inwards" and to become "much more confident in using [his] own private language" and in his explorations of Amerindian culture and mythologies.

=== Themes ===
Simon's work is best known for its explorations of Amerindian cultural traditions in Central and South America. Shamanism, in particular, is a recurrent theme in his work. Important, too, are his repeated engagements with Amerindian timehri – ancient petroglyphs (rock-carvings) that are found throughout Guyana. These Guyanese timehri have been the object of numerous archaeological studies (most notably by Denis Williams), but Simon suggested that in his artwork he tried to "decode" them in his own "particular way", asking himself "why they were written, and what they are trying to say".

Environment is also a major, and related, theme in Simon's work. In an article on "Arts and the Environment" in Stabroek News, Al Creighton described Simon as an artist who engaged with the environment in a particularly "profound" way, especially through his representations of "Arawak co-existence with the land and the water". In an interview from 2011, Simon remarked: "My work is now concentrated on drawing attention to the indigenous people and how they have lived with the environment in mind. I hope this will lead to a general acceptance that man is related to the environment; that the environment is not just bland, but is full of life and has deep meaning".

=== Notable works ===
==== Universal Woman (2008) ====
Universal Woman is one of Simon's most well-known artworks, and is currently displayed at the National Cultural Centre in Georgetown. The painting is a triptych composed of paintings of the water-goddesses or water-spirits of the three main cultures of Guyana: African, Indian and Amerindian. One depicts the Mami-Wata of African and African-diasporic traditions; another depicts Gaṅgā (or Ganga Mai), the female deity of the river Ganges in Hindu; and another the Oriyu – a female water-spirit who features in a number of Amerindian mythic traditions.

Writing for Stabroek News, Al Creighton described the painting as "a major work in Guyanese art", adding: "The triptych is as majestic and powerful as the female deities that it studies". Philbert Gajadhar praised Simon for having achieved "a great synthesis" and a "powerful portrait" with the painting. Gajadhar characterized the painting as "a map of the psyche, the vaporous interior realm where thought and emotion fall weightlessly and vertiginously, tumbling out of the unknown past into the knowable future". Desrey Fox, who was then the head of the Ministry of Education in Guyana, described Universal Woman as "an inspiration from the Amerindian perspective": "[T]hinking spiritually", she said, "from the traditions of our Amerindian people, a lot of what he has put on canvas can teach you about our spirituality".

==== Palace of the Peacock: Homage to Wilson Harris (2009) ====
Palace of the Peacock: Homage to Wilson Harris is a mural situated on one of the walls of the Turkeyen Campus of the University of Guyana. It was jointly painted by Simon (main artist), Philbert Gajadhar, and Anil Roberts. The painting is a tribute to the Guyanese novelist Wilson Harris and his first novel, Palace of the Peacock (1960). The mural was unveiled on 25 June 2009.

The mural is both a representation of the Amazon rainforest and a painting that explores characteristic themes in Harris's work: the environment, spirituality, and Guyanese mythologies. The painting incorporates a mixture of symbols and Guyanese landmarks that appear in Harris's novel, including the peacock of the novel's title, and the Kaieteur Falls.

==== Golden Jaguar Spirit (2010) ====
Golden Jaguar Spirit is an acrylic painting on canvas that presents the jaguar through a perspective that focuses on the rich significance of this animal in Amerindian culture and myth. The markings on the jaguar can be interpreted in various ways: as eyes, as timehri markings, and as leaves of the forest. Critic Al Creighton suggests that the painting portrays the jaguar as a "shamanistic animal" and foregrounds the association of the jaguar with shamanic and kanaimá practices in Amerindian culture. He also notes the suggestions of shape-shifting – the "merging" of animal, forest, spirit and man – in the work.

=== Appraisal ===
Simon is widely recognized as a major Guyanese artist. In an essay from 1996, Sir Wilson Harris described Simon as "a gifted painter to be cherished" and suggested that his work was part of an artistic "renascence". "I celebrate George Simon's arrival," Harris wrote. "He possesses a sure touch, I find, in the veined tapestry, the evolving tapestry, of worlds he and his ancestors have known". In their introductory book on Art in the Caribbean (2010), Stanley Greaves and art critic and historian Anne Walmsley present Simon as "a gifted and accomplished painter" and a notable Caribbean artist. In 2002, Guyanese lecturer and art critic Alim Hosein applauded Simon's work for its "searching, individualistic exploration of his Amerindian heritage". Al Creighton has described him as one of Guyana's "most distinguished artists", who is notable, in particular, for his preoccupation with "the cosmos of the Lokono" and for his "profound" engagement with environmental themes. In an article about "The Rise of Amerindian art" in Guyana, he wrote: "[Simon] very eloquently demonstrates some of the most exciting developments in Guyanese Amerindian art. More than that, he is a leader in charting its directions".

== Awards ==
- 1998: Golden Arrow of Achievement
- 2012: Anthony N. Sabga Caribbean Award for Excellence
