= Arawak =

Group of Indigenous peoples of the Americas

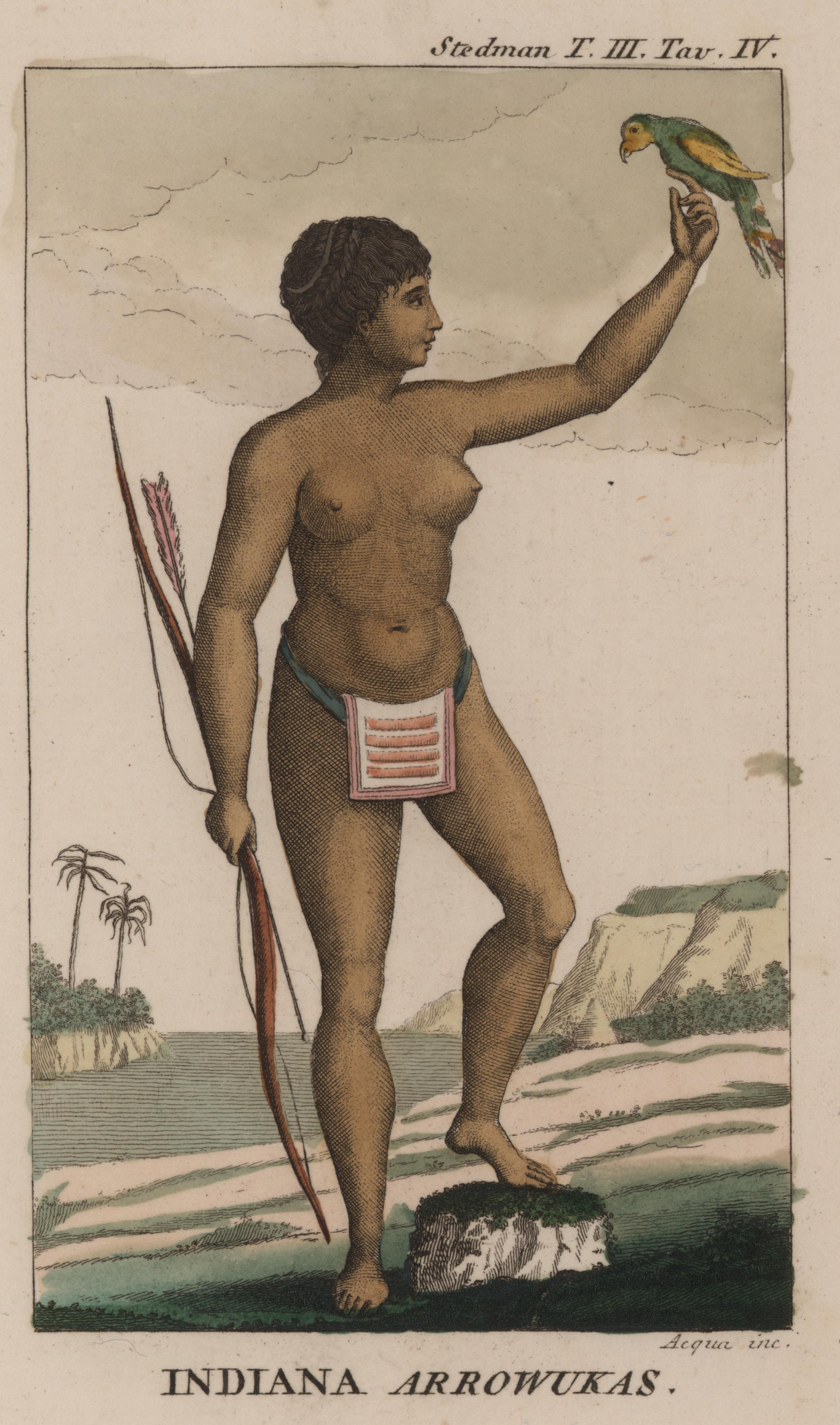
- Arawak woman, by John Gabriel Stedman

Regions with significant populations
- South America, Caribbean

Languages
- Arawakan languages (Lokono, Taíno, etc.), Caribbean English, Caribbean Spanish, Creole languages

Religion
- Native American religion, Spirituality

The Arawak are a group of Indigenous peoples of northern South America and the Caribbean who speak or once spoke related Arawakan languages. The Arawakan family is one of the most widespread Indigenous language families in the Americas.

The term "Arawak" historically applied to peoples on the mainland of South America, the Lokono, but in the 19th century it was extended to peoples in the Caribbean who spoke related varieties. This use created confusion between the mainland and island groups, leading scholars to increasingly prefer the name Taíno for the Caribbean peoples.

== Etymology ==
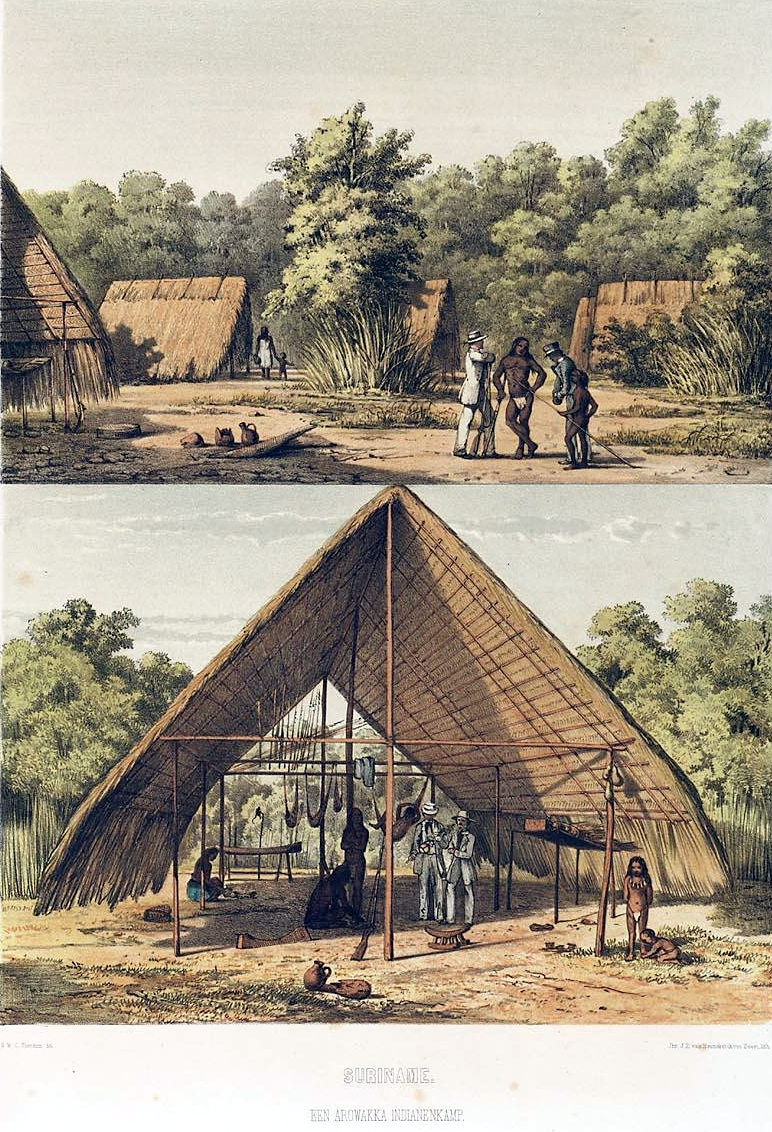
An artistic depiction of a Lokono village in Suriname, 1860.

The etymology of "Arawak" is not clear. Some linguists connect it to Lokono aru, "manioc", suggesting a compound like "manioc eaters" that reflects the people's agricultural traditions, while others connect it to arhoa, "jaguar". Others propose it originated as a designation for people from the Lokono settlement of Aruacay on the lower Orinoco River near modern Barrancas, Venezuela, which came to be extended to all those speaking the same language. The term initially applied specifically to the self-identified Arawaks of the Guianas region: Guyana, Suriname, French Guiana, Venezuelan Guaiana and parts of the island of Tobago. It was adopted into various European languages early in the period of European colonization, written as "Arawak", "Aruak" and many other variations.

In the 19th century, scholars came to extend the term "Arawak" to the peoples in the Caribbean now conventionally known as the Taíno. These peoples spoke a related Arawakan language but had no collective name for themselves; Spanish colonizers had grouped many of these peoples under the term "Taíno", meaning "good" or "noble" in the language. In 1871, ethnologist Daniel Garrison Brinton proposed calling the Caribbean populace "Island Arawak" because of their cultural and linguistic similarities with the mainland Arawak. Subsequent scholars shortened this convention to "Arawak", creating confusion between the island and mainland groups. In the 20th century, scholars such as Irving Rouse resumed using "Taíno" for the Caribbean group to emphasize their distinct culture and language.

== History ==
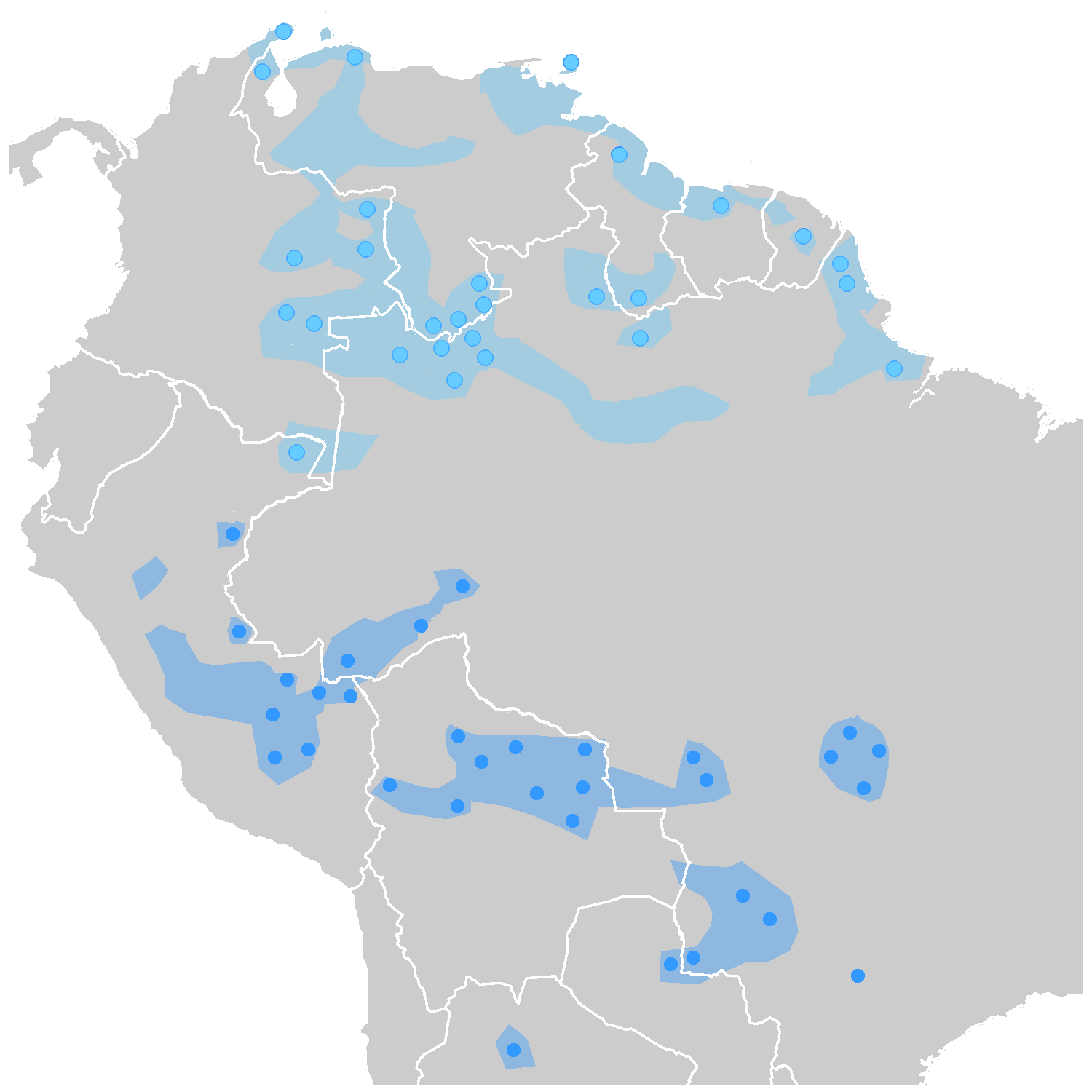
Arawakan languages in South America. The northern Arawakan languages are colored in light blue, the southern Arawakan languages in dark blue.

The Arawakan languages may have emerged in the Orinoco River valley in present-day Venezuela. They subsequently spread widely, becoming the most extensive language family in South America at the time of European contact, with speakers located along the Orinoco and Amazonian rivers and their tributaries. The group that self-identified as the Arawak, also known as the Lokono, settled the coastal areas of what is now Guyana, Suriname, Grenada, Bahamas, Jamaica, and parts of Trinidad and Tobago.

Michael Heckenberger, an anthropologist at the University of Florida who helped found the Central Amazon Project, and his team found elaborate pottery, ringed villages, raised fields, large mounds, and evidence of regional trade networks, all indicating a complex culture. There is also evidence that they modified the soil using various techniques such as adding charcoal to transform it into black earth, which is still famed for its agricultural productivity. Maize and sweet potatoes were their main crops, though they also grew cassava and yautia. The Arawaks fished using nets made of fibers, bones, hooks, and harpoons. According to Heckenberger, pottery and other cultural traits show these people belonged to the Arawakan language family, which also included the Taino, the first Native Americans Columbus encountered in the Americas.

At some point, the Arawakan-speaking Taíno culture emerged in the Caribbean. Archaeological evidence shows early human presence in the Caribbean in Trinidad by about 6000 BC and in Cuba by around 5000 BC. Later migration from South America included Huecoids and Saladoids. Saladoid people had reached Puerto Rico by at least 430 BC and later into Hispaniola. By around 400 AD, these different groups formed the basis of a Caribbean culture. Two major models have been presented to account for the arrival of Taíno ancestors in the islands; the "Circum-Caribbean" model suggests an origin in the Colombian Andes connected to the Arhuaco people, while the Amazonian model supports an origin in the Amazon basin, where the Arawakan languages developed. The Taíno were among the first American people to encounter Europeans. Christopher Columbus visited multiple islands and chiefdoms on his first voyage in 1492, which was followed by the establishment of La Navidad that same year on the northeast coast of Hispaniola, the first Spanish settlement in the Americas. Relationships between the Spaniards and the Taíno would ultimately sour. Some of the lower-level chiefs of the Taíno appeared to have assigned a supernatural origin to the explorers. When Columbus returned to La Navidad on his second voyage, he found the settlement burned down and the 39 men he had left there killed.

With the establishment of a second settlement, La Isabella, and the discovery of gold deposits on the island, the Spanish settler population on Hispaniola started to grow substantially, while disease and conflict with the Spanish began to kill tens of thousands of Taíno every year. By 1504, the Spanish had overthrown the last of the Taíno cacique chiefdoms on Hispaniola, and firmly established the supreme authority of the Spanish colonists over the now-subjugated Taíno. Over the next decade, the Spanish colonists presided over a genocide of the remaining Taíno on Hispaniola, who suffered enslavement, massacres, or exposure to diseases. The population of Hispaniola at the point of first European contact is estimated at between several hundred thousand to over a million people, but by 1514, it had dropped to a mere 35,000. By 1509, the Spanish had successfully conquered Puerto Rico and subjugated the approximately 30,000 Taíno inhabitants. By 1530, there were 1,148 Taíno left alive in Puerto Rico.

Taíno influence has survived even until today, though, as can be seen in the religions, languages, and music of Caribbean cultures. The Lokono and other South American groups resisted colonization for a longer period, and the Spanish remained unable to subdue them throughout the 16th century. In the early 17th century, they allied with the Spanish against the neighbouring Kalina (Caribs), who allied with the English and Dutch. The Lokono benefited from trade with European powers into the early 19th century, but suffered thereafter from economic and social changes in their region, including the end of the plantation economy. Their population declined until the 20th century, when it began to increase again.

Most of the Arawak of the Antilles died out or intermarried after the Spanish conquest. In South America, Arawakan-speaking groups are widespread, from southwest Brazil to the Guianas in the north, representing a wide range of cultures. They are found mostly in the tropical forest areas north of the Amazon. As with all Amazonian native peoples, contact with European settlement has led to culture change and depopulation among these groups.

== Arawakan-speaking peoples and descendants ==
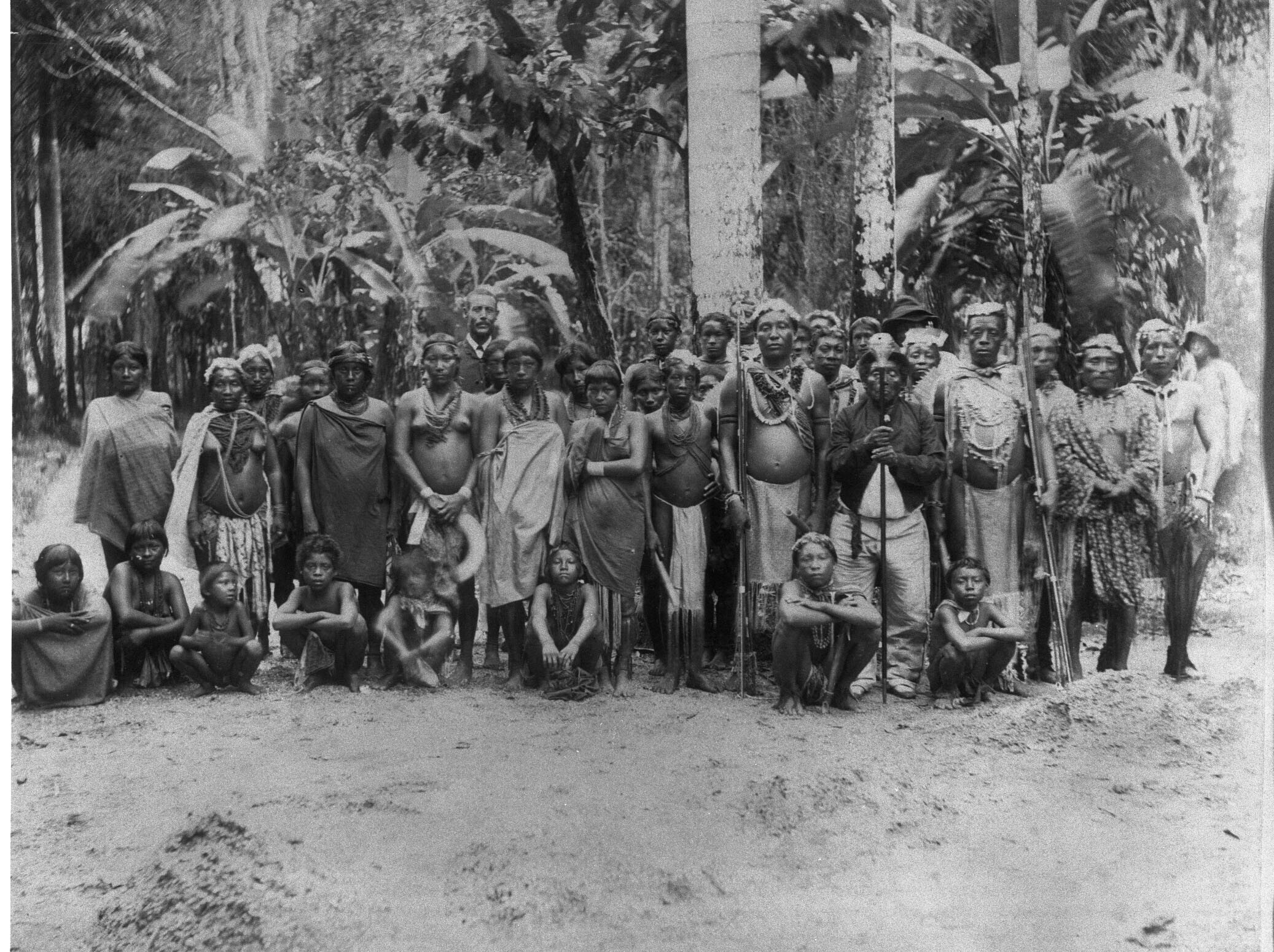
Lokono people gathered for an audience with the Dutch Governor in Paramaribo, Suriname, 1880

=== Garifuna ===
The Garifuna people (/ˌɡɑːriːˈfuːnə/ GAR-ee-FOO-nə or Spanish pronunciation: [ɡa'ɾifuna]; pl. Garínagu in Garifuna) (Note: also known as Central American Island Caribs; formerly known as Caribs, Black Caribs, or Island Caribs until the late 1970s.) are an Afro-Indigenous people of mixed free African and Amerindian ancestry who originated in the Caribbean island of Saint Vincent and traditionally speak Garifuna, an Arawakan language.

The Garifuna are the descendants of Indigenous Arawak and Kalinago (Island Carib) people, and Afro-Caribbean people. The founding population of the Central American diaspora, estimated at 2,500 to 5,000 persons, were transplanted to Roatán from Saint Vincent, which was known to the Garinagu as Yurumein, in the Windward Islands of the Lesser Antilles. Small Garifuna communities still live in Saint Vincent and the Grenadines. The Garifuna diaspora abroad includes communities in Honduras, the United States, and Belize.

=== Lokono ===
In the 21st century, about 10,000 Lokono live primarily in Guyana, with smaller numbers present in Venezuela, Suriname, and French Guiana. Despite colonization, the Lokono population is growing.

In addition, attempts to save the Lokono language, classified as critically-endangered, have been undertaken. An assessment published by Language Documentation and Conservation in 2015 determined the number of Lokono speakers who are fluent in the language had declined to approximately five percent of the known population.

=== Taíno ===
The Spaniards who arrived in the Bahamas, Cuba, Hispaniola (today Haiti and the Dominican Republic), and the Virgin Islands in 1492, and later in Puerto Rico in 1493, first met the Indigenous peoples now commonly referred to as the Taíno, and then the Kalinago and other groups. Some of these groups—most notably the Kalinago—were able to survive despite warfare, disease and slavery brought by the Europeans. Others survived in isolated communities with escaped and free Black people, called Maroons. Many of the explorers and early colonists also raped Indigenous women they came across, resulting in children who were considered mestizo. Some of these mestizo groups retained aspects of Indigenous culture and customs over many generations, especially among rural communities such as the jíbaro.

In time, the number of recorded Indigenous Antilleans was greatly diminished through forced labor, disease and warfare, but also through changes to how Indio groups were recorded in the Spanish Caribbean. For example, the 1787 census in Puerto Rico lists 2,300 "pure" Indios in the population, but on the next census, in 1802, not a single Indio is listed. This created the enduring belief that the Taíno people went extinct, also known as the paper genocide. The paper genocide and the myth of extinction spread throughout colonial empires, Taíno people still continued to practice their culture and teachings passing it down from generation to generation. Much of this was done in secret or disguised through Catholicism in fear for their survival and of discrimination.

With the modern invention of DNA testing, many Caribbean people have discovered they have Indigenous heritage. This has been interpreted by some as supporting the claims of individuals and communities with Taíno heritage living today, particularly in rural areas such as "campos" (meaning small villages/towns in the country side). Though many communities and individuals across the Caribbean have some amount of Indigenous DNA, not all of them identify as Indigenous or Taíno. Those who do identify as Indigenous Caribbean may also use other terms to describe themselves as well as or in addition to Taíno.

There has been increasing scholarly attention paid to Taíno practices and culture, including communities with full or partial Taíno identities. Because of this, Taíno people started to become more open about sharing their identities, passed down Indigenous culture, and beliefs, such as the syncretic religion of Agua Dulce (also known as Tamani) that is practiced in the Dominican Republic. Even before the DNA confirmation in the scientific community, Taíno peoples within the Caribbean and its diasporas had started a movement around the late 1980s and early 1990s calling for the protection, revival or restoration of Taíno culture.

By coming together and sharing individual knowledge passed down by either oral history or maintained practice, these groups were able to use that knowledge and cross-reference the journals of Spaniards to fill in parts of Taíno culture and religion long thought to be lost due to colonization. This movement led to some Yukayekes (Taíno Tribes) being reformed.

Today there are Yukayekes in Cuba, Jamaica, and Puerto Rico, such as "Higuayagua" and "Yukayeke Taíno Borikén". There have also been attempts to revive the Taíno language—such as the Hiwatahia Hekexi dialect—using words that have survived into local Spanish dialects and extrapolation from other Arawakan languages in South America to fill in lost words.

== See also ==
- Aiomun-Kondi, Lokono deity, created the world in Lokono mythology
- Arawakan languages
- Cariban languages
- Classification of Indigenous peoples of the Americas
- Garifuna language
- List of Indigenous names of Caribbean islands
