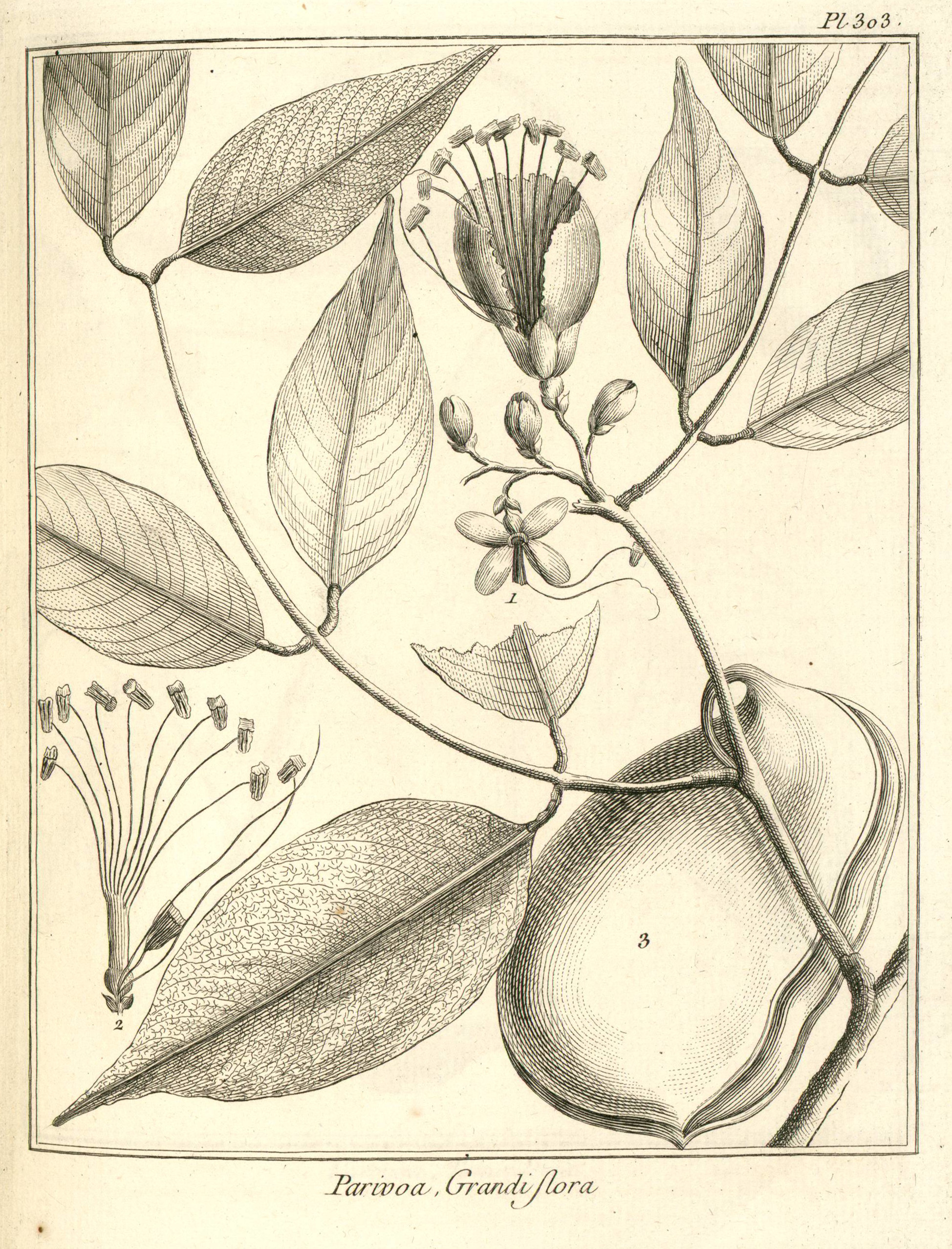
- Drawing of the leaves, flowers and seedpods

Scientific classification
- Kingdom: Plantae
- Clade: Embryophytes
- Clade: Tracheophytes
- Clade: Spermatophytes
- Clade: Angiosperms
- Clade: Eudicots
- Clade: Rosids
- Order: Fabales
- Family: Fabaceae
- Genus: Eperua
- Species: E. grandiflora

Binomial name
- Eperua grandiflora Aubl.

Synonyms
- Dimorpha grandiflora (Aubl.) Forsyth f.; Parivoa grandiflora (Aubl.)

= Eperua grandiflora =

Species of flowering plant

Eperua grandiflora (Arawak: Yoboko, Itoeri Walaba, Guyanese Creole: Ituri Wallaba, Yokobo Wallaba) is a species of flowering plant in the family Fabaceae, native to northern South America. This evergreen tree is used both for construction and medicinal purposes. Its inner bark is decoted as a traditional remedy for toothache. This tree relies on gravity to disperse its seeds.
