= Jean La Rose =

Indigenous environalist from Guyana (born 1962)

- Born: 6 May 1962 (age 63); Santa Rosa, Guyana
- Citizenship: Guyanese
- Known for: Grassroots environmentalism
- Awards: Goldman Environmental Prize (2002)

Jean La Rose (born 6 May 1962) is an Lokono environmentalist and Indigenous rights activist from Georgetown, Guyana. She was awarded the Goldman Environmental Prize in 2002 for her work to halt mining in their territories, to secure local's full rights to their traditional homelands, and to save Guyana's forests.

She is the Executive Director of Amerindian Peoples Association, which was founded in 1991, La Rose joining in 1994. She worked with Oxfam charities for funding.

According to La Rose, bringing indigenous issues to the national stage is to "preserve the environment in a wholesome way. We want to do our farming yes, We want to preserve our cultural sites. We want to preserve our languages. We can still preserve many of these things if legislation and policy protects us."

== Personal life ==
Born in Guyana's North West district, La Rose attended Rosa Roman Catholic School (Now Santa Rosa Primary) and obtained a scholarship to attend South Georgetown Secondary School, graduating in 1974. She worked at the University of Guyana library, until securing a scholarship to study there for her Bachelor’s Degree in History in 1991. In 1992, she participated in an International Cooperative Human Rights Training Programme, sponsored by the Canadian Human Rights Foundation in Quebec and in 1998 a course on 'Indigenous Rights in the International System', organized by the International Training Centre for Indigenous Peoples in Greenland. These programs gave La Rose insight into the deficiencies of the Amerindian Act for protecting indigenous people.

In Guyana, she coordinated a signature campaign to put a moratorium on timber concessions at a 1994 World Bank Meeting, as well as other efforts in campaigning for "reducing the effect and impact of mining on indigenous communities, reviewing the Amerindian Act, reforming the Constitution of Guyana to include indigenous and environmental rights, renouncing the Beal Aerospace Project in the Waini area, amending the Kaieteur National Park Act to encompass right of occupation and use for Patamona people, and ensuring Amerindian rights in the establishment of protected areas." In 1998, she worked with Amerindian communities to put forth a lawsuit for land titles. Amerindians were granted land under the Constitution of Guyana, however, destructive mining activities adjacent to Amerindian owned lands impact their water supply.

She was elected vice-chairman of the Constitution Reform Commission in 1999 resulting in creation of the Indigenous Peoples Commission and Article 149 G.

In 2017, she worked with Indigenous communities of the greater Caribbean region to form a group similar to Latin American countries.
