= Oswald Hussein =

Guyanese artist of Lokono descent (born 1946)

Oswald ("Ossie") Hussein
- Born: 1954 (age 71–72); St. Cuthbert's Mission, Guyana
- Known for: Sculpture and carving
- Notable work: Massasekeree (1989), Wepelly (1993), Oriyu Banka (1995)
- Movement: Lokono Artists Group
- Relatives: George Simon (brother)
- Awards: National Visual Arts Exhibition First Prize, 1989 and 1993

Oswald ("Ossie") Hussein (born 1954) is a Guyanese artist of Lokono (Arawak) descent. Though he occasionally works in other mediums, he is best known for his wooden sculptures, which explore various dimensions of Arawak Amerindian culture and tradition. Hussein first achieved national recognition when he won first prize in Guyana's National Exhibition of the Visual Arts in 1989, and since that time he has gone on to become one of Guyana's most celebrated artists and a leading figure in Guyanese sculpture. Along with his half-brother, George Simon, he is one of the most prominent members of the Lokono Artists Group. His work has been displayed in numerous exhibitions in Guyana, Barbados, and the United Kingdom.

== Life ==
Oswald Hussein was born in St. Cuthbert's Mission (Arawak: Pakuri) in British Guiana (now Guyana) in 1954.

Hussein first started working in wood carving and sculpture in the 1960s. In 1988, he joined an art and design workshop in St. Cuthbert's that was founded and led by his half-brother George Simon when the latter returned to Guyana after studying art in the UK. The workshop in St. Cuthbert's enabled a number of local artists, including Hussein, to develop their skills; and as the national reputation of these artists grew, they came to be known as the Lokono Artists' group.

Hussein's involvement in the Lokono Artists Group and the St. Cuthbert's workshop marked the beginning of his rise to national, and later international success. In 1989 he won first prize in Guyana's National Exhibition of the Visual Arts with his sculpture Massasekeree; and in 1993 he repeated this achievement when he won first prize again for this sculpture Wepelly. In 1991, Hussein's work was displayed at the Hadfield foundation as part of an exhibition called Contemporary Amerindian Art, which showcased the work of nine members of the Lokono Artists Group. After another group exhibition in 1998 entitled Six Lokono Artists, the Venezuelan Cultural Centre in Georgetown hosted the first solo exhibition of Hussein's work in 1999, entitled Sunset Birds. This was closely followed by Sunset Birds II - an exhibition dedicated to Hussein and fellow Lokono artist Roaland Taylor, at the National Art Gallery in Castellani House in 2000.

In 2006, Hussein was offered the position of artist-in-residence at the Horniman Museum in London. The residency was initially planned to begin in August of that year, but Hussein had to delay his journey after he was badly injured in a motorbike accident shortly before he was due to leave the UK. During his residency at the Horniman Museum, Hussein took part in an art exhibition called Amazon to Caribbean: Early Peoples of the Rainforest, which was curated by Hassan Arero.

== Art ==
As a sculptor, Hussein's artistic method and style have varied and developed over the years. His sculptures always begin from a section of tree-trunk, and can take anything from one day to four months to complete. Critics have remarked upon substantial stylistic differences between his early and later works. While his early sculptures are predominantly large-scale pieces that are balanced between horizontal and vertical planes, his later works are noticeably smaller and most often vertically oriented.

Conceptually, Hussein draws inspiration from his native Arawak cultural traditions. In an interview from 2006, he explained that a number of his sculptures were based upon stories that his mother told him when he was young, about "animals, humming birds or fish [...] and the sun and rain gods which mark events in our lives".

=== Notable works ===
==== Oriyu Banka (1995) ====
Oriyu Banka is a wooden sculpture that was created by Hussein in 1995. The sculpture is made of saman wood, and measures approximately 70 by 25.5 centimetres. It is a long, rounded sculpture that is covered with bold, geometric patterns, the most prominent of which are the circular, eye-like designs in the centre of the piece and the 12 sharp, curved "teeth" that protrude from its sides. The Arawakan title of the work translates as "Bench of the Water Spirit", with "Oriyu" being the name of a well-known female water-spirit in Arawak and other Amerindian mythologies. Critics Anne Walmsley and Stanley Greaves note that while the sculpture's shape and title are suggestive of a traditional bench, its sharp teeth and caiman-like appearance "would defy any human to sit on it".

== Awards ==
- 1989: First Prize in National Exhibition of the Visual Arts, Guyana
- 1993: First Prize in National Exhibition of the Visual Arts, Guyana
