= Aiomun-Kondi =

Arawak deity

Aiomun-Kondi, also spelt Aiomum-Kondi and Aimon-Kondi, is a Lokono deity, whose name means "top king creator god". Aiomum Kondi was the ruler of the gods and the sky.

He is said to have attempted to create a model world, but considered his first two attempts to be failures due to their inhabitants' depraved behavior. He burned his first world and flooded the second, but saved one couple from the latter; Marerewana and his wife. Marerewana saved himself and his family by taking shelter in a large canoe that was tied to a tree.

Aiomun-Kondi then realized that there would always be corruption in the world, and moved on.
