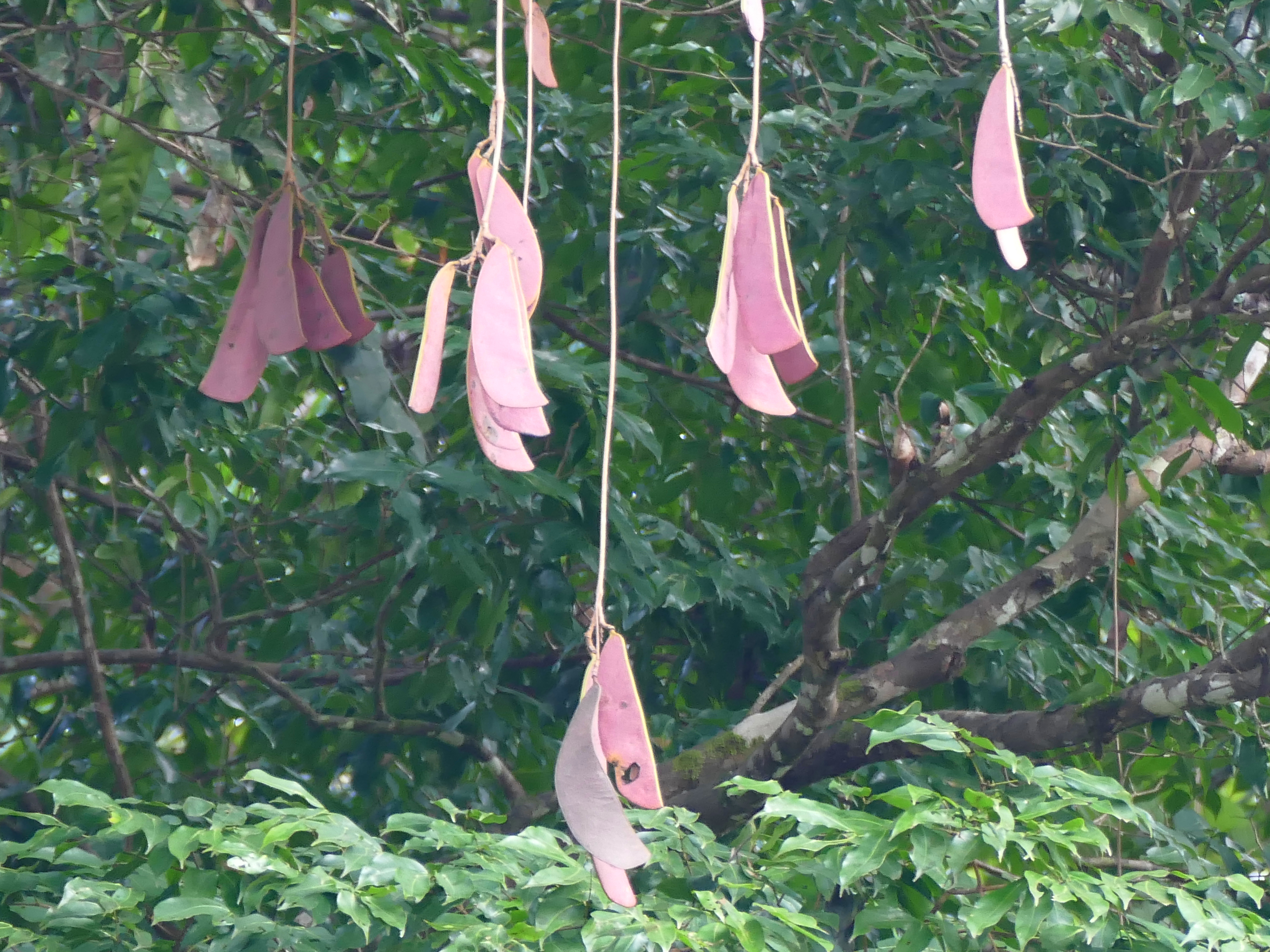
- Eperua falcata

Scientific classification
- Kingdom: Plantae
- Clade: Embryophytes
- Clade: Tracheophytes
- Clade: Spermatophytes
- Clade: Angiosperms
- Clade: Eudicots
- Clade: Rosids
- Order: Fabales
- Family: Fabaceae
- Subfamily: Detarioideae
- Tribe: Detarieae
- Genus: Eperua; Aubl. (1775)

Species
- 16; see text

Synonyms
- Adleria Neck. (1790), opus utique oppr.; Dimorpha Schreb. (1791); Panzera Willd. (1799); Parivoa Aubl. (1775); Rotmannia Neck. (1790), opus utique oppr.

= Eperua =

Genus of legumes

Eperua is a genus of flowering plants in the legume family, Fabaceae. It belongs to subfamily Detarioideae. It includes 16 species native to northern South America, in Colombia, Venezuela, the Guianas, and northern Brazil. They live in the jungles, often along rivers or streams. The leaves are compound pinnate, with smooth margins, and the fruits are long pods. The wood of E. falcata is called wallaba and is often used in construction.

- Eperua banaensis G.A.Romero & Aymard
- Eperua bijuga Mart. ex Benth.
- Eperua duckeana R.S.Cowan
- Eperua falcata Aubl. occurs in Suriname, French Guiana and Guyana, a 30 m high jungle tree called Wallaba or Bijlhout by the natives. The bark is grey brown, and the leaves pinnately compound with 2-4 pairs of obovate leaflets ~ 18 cm long. The flowers are bell-shaped in terminal or subterminal clusters. They have red petals, 5 fertile and 5 sterile stamens. The pods are up to 30 cm long and 6 cm wide, with 2-5 flat seeds.
- Eperua glabra R.S.Cowan
- Eperua glabriflora (Ducke) R.S.Cowan
- Eperua grandiflora (Aubl.) Baill. "Itoeri wallaba" occurs in Suriname, Guyana, and French Guiana.
- Eperua jenmanii Oliv.
- Eperua obtusata R.S.Cowan
- Eperua oleifera Ducke
- Eperua praesagata R.S.Cowan
- Eperua purpurea Benth.
- Eperua rubiginosa Miq. also occurs in Suriname and Guyana; about 30 m high. It has unpaired pinnately compound leaves. The flowers with red and white petals have 10 fertile stamens. The pods are rusty brown, and up to 25 cm long and 5 cm wide.
- Eperua schomburgkiana Benth. ~30 m high; occurs in the Guyanas. The flowers are in clusters and contain 10 fertile stamens. The pods are 20 cm long.
- Eperua venosa R.S.Cowan
