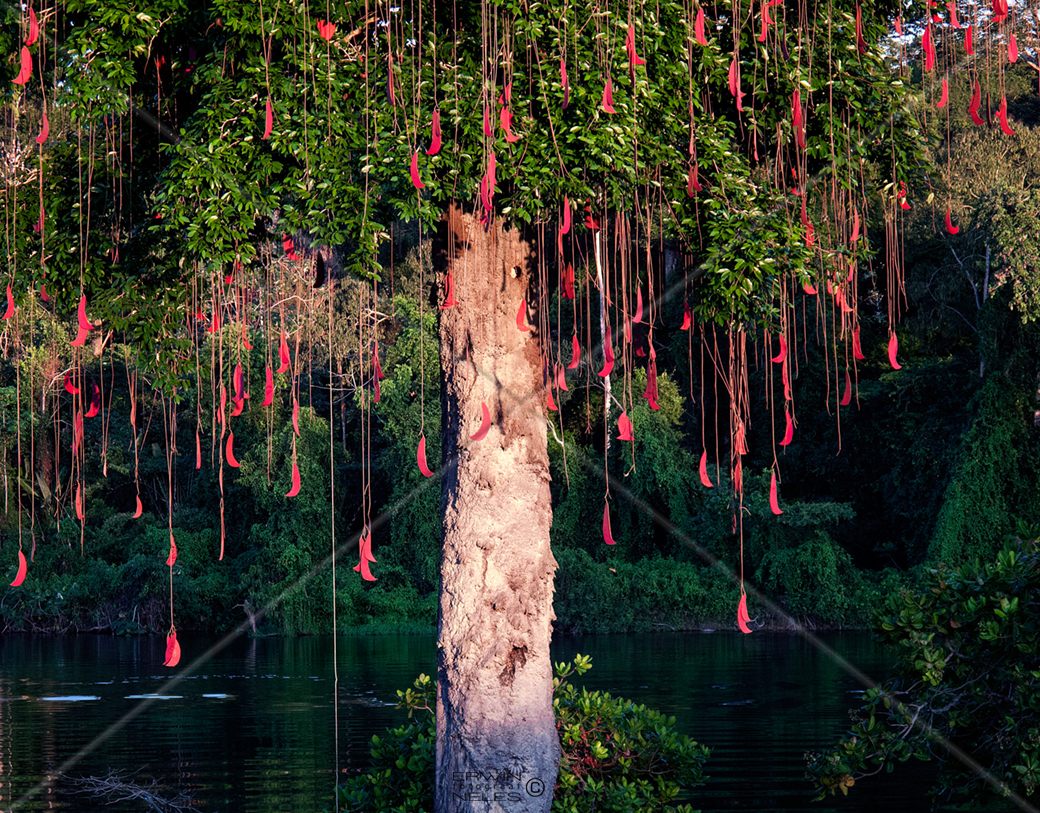
- At sunset
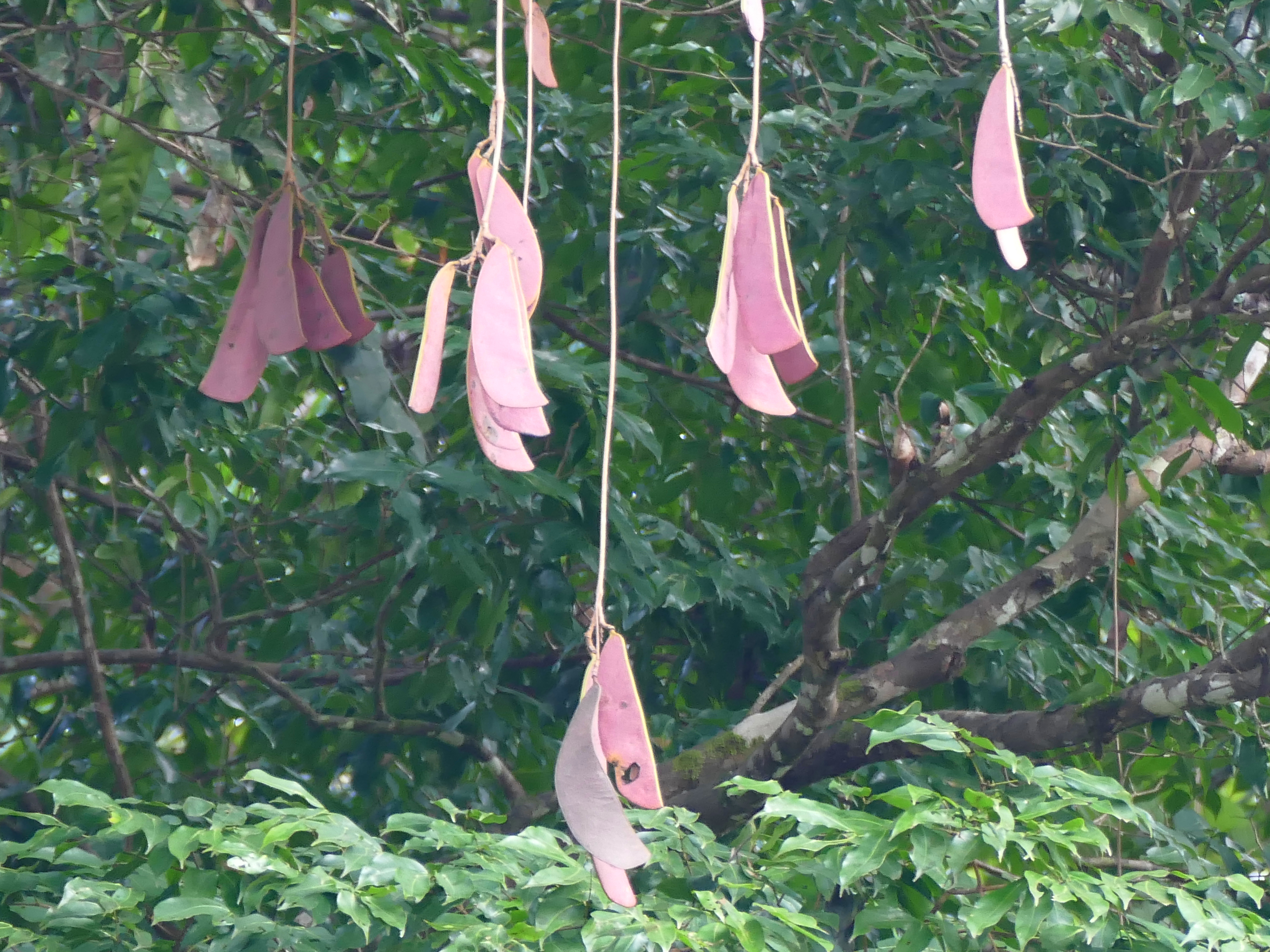
- Pods burst open when ripe and fling seeds up to 30 m (100 ft)

Scientific classification
- Kingdom: Plantae
- Clade: Embryophytes
- Clade: Tracheophytes
- Clade: Spermatophytes
- Clade: Angiosperms
- Clade: Eudicots
- Clade: Rosids
- Order: Fabales
- Family: Fabaceae
- Genus: Eperua
- Species: E. falcata

Binomial name
- Eperua falcata Aubl.

Synonyms
- Dimorpha falcata (Aubl.) Forsyth f.; Panzera falcata (Aubl.) Willd.

= Eperua falcata =

Species of flowering plant

Eperua falcata, the bootlace tree, is a species of flowering plant in the family Fabaceae, native to northern South America. Capable of growing in pure white sand, its timber is valued for its resistance to decay and is used for shingles, telephone poles, and similar applications.
