= Amerindian Heritage Month (Guyana) =

Annual observance in honour of Guyana's indigenous peoples

Amerindian Heritage Month is an annual observance that is held every September in Guyana in honour of Guyana's indigenous peoples.

== History ==
Amerindian Heritage Month has its beginnings in Amerindian commemorations of 10 September 1957 - the day on which Stephen Campbell became Guyana's first Amerindian Member of Parliament. On 10 September 1995, Guyana's Prime Minister, Cheddi Jagan, officially designated September as Amerindian Heritage Month. In memory of Campbell's achievement, 10 September is still celebrated as "Heritage Day".

== Events and festivities ==
The official opening of Amerindian Heritage Month celebrations takes place at the Umana Yana on the first day of September. Every year a 'Heritage Village' is selected, which becomes the focus of festivities, particularly on 10 September. Previous Heritage Villages include: Micobie (2012), Aishalton (2011), Sophia (2010), Orealla (2009), and Santa Aratak (2008).
