= Lokono language =

Arawakan language spoken in South America

Arawak
- Lokono Dian
- Native to: French Guiana, Guyana, Trinidad, Suriname, Venezuela
- Region: Guianas
- Ethnicity: Lokono (Arawak)
- Native speakers: (2,500 cited 1990–2012)
- Language family: Arawakan: Northern; Ta-Arawakan; Arawak
- Writing system: Latin script

Language codes
- ISO 639-2: arw
- ISO 639-3: arw
- Glottolog: araw1276
- ELP: Lokono
- Arawak is classified as Critically Endangered by the UNESCO Atlas of the World's Languages in Danger

Lokono (Lokono Dian, literally "people's talk" by its speakers), also known as Arawak, is an Arawakan language spoken by the Lokono (Arawak) Indigenous peoples of South America in eastern Venezuela, Colombia, Guyana, Trinidad and Tobago, Suriname, and French Guiana. It is the eponymous language of the Indigenous Arawakan language family.

Lokono is an active–stative language.

== History ==
Lokono is a critically endangered language. The Lokono language is most commonly spoken in South America. Some specific countries where this language is spoken include Guyana, Suriname, French Guiana, Colombia and Venezuela.

The percentage of living fluent speakers with active knowledge of the language is estimated to be 5% of the ethnic population. There are small communities of semi-speakers who have varying degrees of comprehension and fluency in Lokono that keep the language alive. It is estimated that there are around 2,500 remaining speakers (including fluent and semi-fluent speakers).

The decline in the use of Lokono as a language of communication is due to its lack of transmission from older speakers to the next generation. The language is not being passed to young children, as they are taught to speak the official languages of their countries.

== Classification ==
The Lokono language is part of the larger Arawakan language family spoken by Indigenous people in South and Central America along with the Caribbean. The family spans four countries of Central America — Belize, Honduras, Guatemala, Nicaragua — and eight of South America — Bolivia, Guyana, French Guiana, Surinam, Venezuela, Colombia, Peru, Brazil (and also formerly Argentina and Paraguay). With about 40 extant languages, it is the largest language family in Latin America.

=== Etymology ===
Arawak is a tribal name in reference to the main crop food, the cassava root, commonly known as manioc. The cassava root is a popular staple for millions of people in South America, Asia and Africa. It is a woody shrub grown in tropical or subtropical regions. Speakers of Arawak also identify themselves as Lokono, which translates as "the people". They call their language Lokono Dian, "the people's speech".

Alternative names of the same language include Arawák, Arahuaco, Aruak, Arowak, Arawac, Araguaco, Aruaqui, Arwuak, Arrowukas, Arahuacos, Locono, and Luccumi.

== Geographic distribution ==
Lokono is an Arawakan language most commonly found to be spoken in eastern Venezuela, Colombia, Guyana, Suriname and French Guiana. There are approximately 2,500 native speakers today. The following are regions where Arawak has been found spoken by native speakers.

== Phonology ==
=== Consonants ===
Consonants
		Bilabial	Alveolar	Retroflex	Palatal	Velar	Glottal
Stop	voiceless		t			k	
Stop	aspirated		tʰ			kʰ	
Stop	voiced	b	d				
Fricative		ɸ	s				h
Nasal		m	n				
Approximant		w	l		j		
Rhotic	trill		r				
Rhotic	tap			ɽ			

William Pet observes an additional /p/ in loanwords.

=== Vowels ===
	Front	Central	Back
Close	i	ɨ	
Mid	e		o
Open		a	

Pet notes that phonetic realization of /o/ varies between [o] and [u].

== Writing system ==
The Arawak language system has an alphabetical system similar to the Roman Alphabet with some minor changes and new additions to letters.

Consonants
Character Used	Additional Usage	IPA symbol
b		b
č	ch, tj	t͡ʃ
d		d ~ d͡ʒ
f		ɸ
h	x	h
j	y	j
k	c, qu	k
kh	k, c, qu	kʰ
l		l
lh	ř	ɽ
m		m
n		n
p		p
r		ɾ
s	z, c	s
t		t ~ t͡ʃ
th	t	tʰ ~ t͡ʃʰ
hu	w	w
'		ʔ

Vowels
Character Used	Additional Usage	IPA Symbol
a		a
aa	a·	aː
e		e
ee	e·, e:	eː
i		i
ii	i·, i:	iː
o		o ~ u
oo	o·, o:	oː
y	u, ɨ	ɨ
yy	y:, uu, ɨɨ	ɨː

== Grammar ==
=== Verbs ===
Arawak verbs are classified either as 'event' or 'non-event' (aka 'stative') verbs. Most stative verbs express adjectival meanings, similarly to in a number of Native American languages, genetic clarification aside. Event verbs require subjects, and may take objects.

There are two exceptional classes of verb - the copula to 'to be' (which has no semantic relation with the article to, aside from that the copula is often omitted around the article), and a dummy verb. This dummy verb "behaves morphologically like an event verb".

=== Pronouns ===
The personal pronouns are shown below. The forms on the left are free forms, which can stand alone. The forms on the right are bound forms (prefixes), which must be attached to the front of a verb, a noun, or a postposition.

	Singular	Plural
1st Person	de, da-	we, wa-
2nd Person	bi, by-	hi, hy-
3rd Person	li, ly- (he) tho, thy- (she)	ne, na-

=== Cross-referencing affixes ===
All verbs are sectioned into transitive, active transitive, and stative intransitive.

Prefixes (A/Sa) and Suffixes (O/So) of Cross-Reference Affixes
		prefixes		suffixes	
		singular	plural	singular	plural
1st person		nu- or ta-	wa-	-na, -te	-wa
2nd person		(p)i-	(h)i-	-pi	-hi
3rd person	non-formal	ri-, i	na-	ri, -i	-na
3rd person	formal	thu-, ru-	na-	-thu,-ru, -u	-na
'impersonal'		pa-	-	-	-

A= Sa=cross referencing prefix

O=So= cross referencing suffix

== Vocabulary ==
=== Gender ===
In the Arawak language, there are two distinct genders of masculine and feminine. They are used in cross-referencing affixes, in demonstratives, in nominalization and in personal pronouns. Typical pronominal genders, for example, are feminine and non-feminine. The markers go back to Arawak third-person singular cross-referencing: feminine -(r)u, masculine -(r)i

=== Number ===
Arawak Languages do distinguish singular and plural, however plural is optional unless the referent is a person. Markers used are *-na/-ni (animate/human plural) and *-pe (inanimate/animate non-human plural).

=== Possession ===
Arawak nouns are fragmented into inalienably and alienably possessed. Inalienably crossed nouns include things such as body parts, terms for kinship and common nouns like food selections. Deverbal nominalization belong to that grouping. Both forms of possession are marked with prefixes (A/Sa). Inalienably possessed nouns have what is known as an "unpossessed" form (also known as "absolute") marked with the suffix *-tfi or *-hV. Alienably possessed nouns take one of the suffixes *-ne/ni, *-te, *-re, *i/e, or *-na. All suffixes used as nominalizers.

=== Negation ===
Arawak languages have a negative prefix ma- and attributive-relative prefix ka-. An example of the use is ka-witi-w ("a woman with good eyes") and ma-witti-w ("a woman with bad eyes", i.e., a blind woman).

=== Tenses ===
Tenses are added at the end of a sentence: past tense is indicated with bura or bora (from ubura "before"), future tense with dikki (from adiki "after"), present continuous tense uses loko or roko.

== Examples ==
English	Eastern Arawak (French Guiana)	Western Arawak (Venezuela, Guyana, and Suriname)
One	Ábą	Aba
Two	Bian	Biama
Three	Kabun	Kabyn
Four	Biti	Bithi
Man	Wadili	Wadili
Woman	Hiaro	Hiaro
Dog	Péero	Péero
Sun	Hadali	Hadali
Moon	Kati	Kathi
Water	Uini	Vuniabu

== Bibliography ==
- Pet, Willem J. A. (2011). A Grammar Sketch and Lexicon of Arawak (Lokono Dian) (PDF). SIL eBook 30. SIL International. Archived from the original (PDF) on 2016-12-13.
