= Lokono =

Indigenous people in northern South America

Lokono

Total population
- 10,000

Regions with significant populations
- Guyana, Suriname, Venezuela, French Guiana

Languages
- Lokono

Religion
- Indigenous religion

Related ethnic groups
- Taino

The Lokono or Arawak (Are an Aborigene Language Art of Indigenous Americans, not to be mistaken as creole) are an Indigenous peoples from the northern coastal regions of South America. Today, approximately 10,000 Lokono live primarily along the coasts and rivers of Guyana, with smaller numbers in Venezuela, Suriname, and French Guiana.

They speak the Lokono language, the eponymous language of the Arawakan language family, as well as various Creole languages, and English.

== Name ==
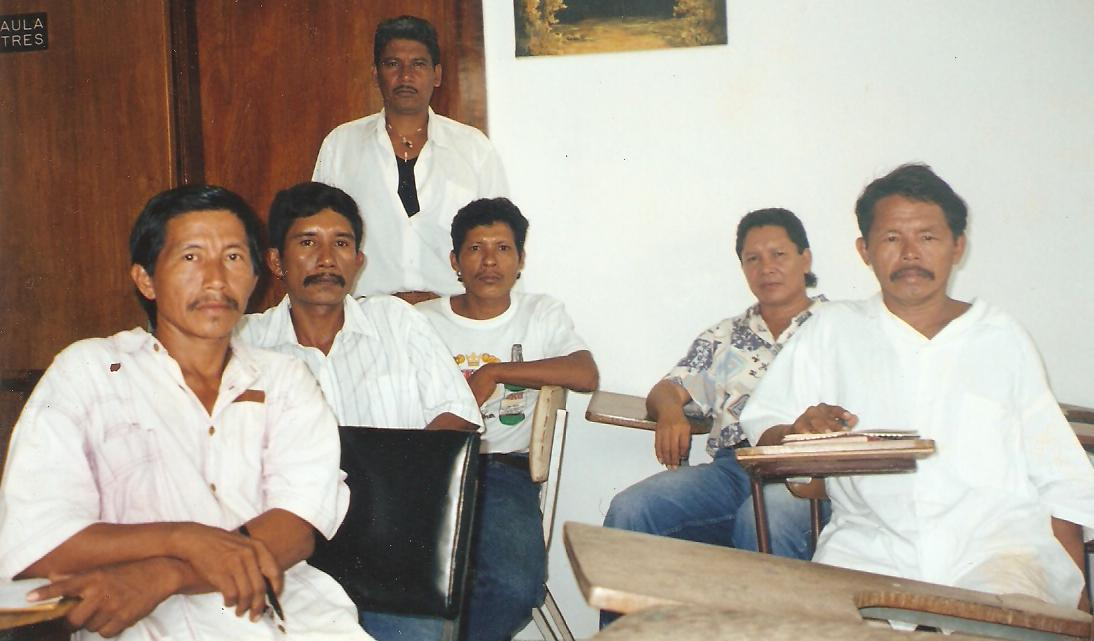
The Lokono Artists Group

The name Lokono comes from the Lokono words loko meaning "people" and no, a suffix that makes a noun plural. They are also called Arawak.

In 1989, John P. Bennett (Lokono) wrote that the word Arawak was not originally a Lokono word but was adopted by them.

In the 19th century, when Western scholars had established that the major Indigenous population of the Caribbean during European contact (now known as the [Taíno] were culturally and linguistically related to the South American Lokono-Arawak, ethnologist Daniel Garrison Brinton proposed calling the Caribbean people "Island Arawak". Subsequent scholars shortened this convention to simply "Arawak", thereby causing confusion with the mainland people.

The Lokono are also called Arawak-Taíno.

In the 20th century, scholars such as Irving Rouse began using the older term Taíno for the Caribbean peoples to distinguish them from mainlanders. The mainland Arawak call themselves "Lokono" (also spelled "Locono" and "Lokomo"); this has become more common in scholarly literature since the late 20th century.

== History ==
The Arawakan languages may have developed in the Orinoco River Valley, and subsequently spread widely as speakers migrated, becoming the region's most extensive language family by the time of European contact. The group that identified as the Arawak or Lokono settled the coastal and river valley areas of what is now Guyana, Suriname, French Guiana, Barbados and parts of the island of Trinidad.

While the Spanish rapidly colonized the Caribbean islands, the Lokono and other mainland peoples resisted colonization for a much longer period. The Spanish were unable to subdue them throughout the 16th century. However, with increased encroachment from other European powers in the early 17th century, the Lokono allied with Spain against the neighboring Kalina (Caribs), who had allied with the English and Dutch. Subsequently, the Lokono engaged in trading relationships with the Europeans, an arrangement that led to prosperity. However, economic and social changes in the region in the early 19th century, including the end of the plantation economy, adversely affected the Lokono, and their population began to decline.

In the 20th century, the Lokono supplemented their traditional agricultural economy by selling fish and lumber and through migrant labor. Their population has begun to rise again. Approximately 10,000 Lokono are living in Venezuela, Guyana, Suriname, and French Guiana, as well as thousands of others with Lokono ancestry.

== Guyana ==
The Lokono are one of three Amerindian peoples living in coastal Guyana. The other two are the Kalihna and Warau. Historically, they had matrilineal, agrarian societies. In the 18th century, Dutch colonists hired them as fishermen and salt miners, but they were not enslaved. In the 19th century, Lokono people worked under the English colonists. Lokono have often intermarried with Afro-Guyanese people, and their children are accepted as being Amerind. By the 20th century, many of them assimilated in part to the Afro-Guyanese and Indo-Guyanese cultures; however, they have taken efforts to keep their Lokono language alive in their communities. In 1989, John Peter Bennet (Arawak) wrote an An Arawak-English Dictionary. In the 20th century, schools have implemented a 10-month language programme for Lokono children.

=== Barbados ===
In 1627, English colonists convinced a Lokono family to move to Barbados to help with farming.

== Suriname ==
Johannes Karwafodi (Lokono, 1878–after 1940) was an important botanist and researcher in Suriname.

== Religion ==
Lokono have their own Indigenous religion. They respected spirits found in nature. Spiritual healers could communicate with these spirits, cure people, and offer advice.

In the 18th century, Jeptha (Lokono), aided by two boys, translated the Bible and German hymns into Lokono.

== Notable Lokono people ==
- Oswald Hussein, a Lokono sculptor who incorporates "rituals, spirits and animals held sacred by his culture" into his art.
- John Peter Bennett (1914–2011), a Lokono linguist and Anglican priest from Guyana
