= McAndrew =

McAndrew is a surname reflecting Irish and Scottish ancestry, people with the Surname include the following:

- British photographer Chris McAndrew
- British journalist Daisy McAndrew
- British playwright and actor Deborah McAndrew (born 1967)
- American psychologist Francis T. McAndrew
- American general James W. McAndrew (1862–1922)
- American baseball player Jamie McAndrew
- Canadian Jim McAndrew (athlete)
- American baseball player Jim McAndrew
- New Zealand rally driver Joe McAndrew
- Mayo Gaelic footballer John McAndrew
- Canadian politician John Alfred McAndrew
- American singer Matt McAndrew
- Australian cricketer Nathan McAndrew
- English model Nell McAndrew
- Scottish footballer Tony McAndrew
- American sports coach William McAndrew
- American educator William McAndrew
- Guyanese folklorist poet Wordsworth McAndrew
  - Wordsworth McAndrew Award

== See also ==
- MacAndrew
- McAndrew Stadium of Southern Illinois University
- "McAndrew's Hymn", an 1894 poem by Rudyard Kipling
- McAndrews (disambiguation)
