= Cletus Henriques =

Guyanese painter and designer (c. 1927–1976)

- Born: c. 1927
- Died: 1976; Georgetown, Guyana
- Education: St. Stanislaus College, Georgetown
- Known for: Painting, public monuments, postage stamp design
- Notable work: River's Edge (1968); Masquerade Dancers (1969); Enmore Martyrs Monument (unveiled 1977)

Cletus Henriques (c. 1927 – 1976) was a Guyanese painter, designer and arts organizer. After training in Brazil, he painted in figurative, expressionist and abstract modes, and several of his works are held in the National Collection of Art at Castellani House in Georgetown. He helped install the visual arts exhibition of the first Caribbean Festival of Creative Arts in 1972, designed the Enmore Martyrs Monument, and designed the stamps issued by several Caribbean states in 1976 to commemorate the West Indies' victory in the 1975 Cricket World Cup. He was killed in Georgetown in 1976; as of 2023 the case remained unsolved.

== Early life and training ==
Henriques was a student at St. Stanislaus College in Georgetown. He later lived in Brazil for many years, receiving formal training in art. His work there included designing jewelry and producing miniature devotional images of saints for an antiques workshop. The Guyanese painter Stanley Greaves later suggested that these years exposed Henriques to approaches to painting that few artists in Guyana were using.

== Career ==
Back in Guyana, Henriques joined the staff of the National History and Arts Council, assisting in the organization and staging of art exhibitions. The council, chaired in 1972 by Lynette Dolphin, ran the annual national art exhibitions at which the government bought works for the National Collection.

Henriques was listed among Guyana's participating artists at Caribbean Festival of Arts, held in Georgetown from August 25 to September 15, 1972. With the painters Dudley Charles, Christie Goodheart and Zaman Ali, he converted Bishops' High School into the festival's art gallery: the team cleared and repainted the building, built screens and display cases, and gave each country's work its own classroom. According to Charles, Henriques was the only member of the team with experience of large exhibitions, which he had seen in Brazil. The festival's international exhibition included some 500 works by more than 220 artists from 13 countries.

The writer Terence Roberts later grouped Henriques with Basil Hinds and Denis Williams as one of the three figures who did most to organize and adjudicate the visual arts in Guyana, noting that their assessments often led the government to purchase works for the National Collection.

== Work ==
=== Style ===
Henriques's early paintings were figurative. Reviewing Circa 1966, a 2005 Independence exhibition at Castellani House, the critic Rashid Osman wrote that the early Shave Ice Cart predated Henriques's experiments with "jewel-like shapes" and rich color reminiscent of Latin American painting.

Greaves described River's Edge (1968) as one of the finest paintings of Henriques's expressionist middle period. He distinguished it from abstract expressionism, since water, riverbank and sky remain recognizable, and noted its wet-into-wet brushwork and a harmonious palette confined to yellows, blues and greens. Greaves considered Hubert Moshett and Ron Savory, in some of their works, the Guyanese painters closest to Henriques's approach. The artist Akima McPherson observed that in his other works in the National Collection, abstraction is built from geometric forms and textural effects, with shapes that appear to float within the composition. In a 2010 essay, Greaves placed Henriques beside Philip Moore as an artist of "pure expression", in contrast to the formal analysis of Denis Williams and Carl Anderson.

The scholar Al Creighton cited Henriques's Roraima (1968) as an example of Guyanese artists representing the interior landscape through abstraction. Masquerade Dancers (1969) reduces a Guyanese Christmas masquerade to three figures, simplified into areas of decorative pattern against vertical bands of muted, almost pastel color.

=== Selected works ===
- Kissing Bridge (1965)
- Shave-Ice Man (1967)
- River's Edge (1968), oil on board, 94 × 109 cm, National Collection of Art
- Roraima (1968), National Collection of Art
- Masquerade Dancers (1969), National Collection of Art

=== Enmore Martyrs Monument ===
Greaves credits Henriques with the Enmore Martyrs Monument, one of the public monuments whose construction was promoted by Denis Williams, Guyana's Director of Art. The memorial stands on the Enmore Sugar Estate Road in Enmore, East Coast Demerara. It honors five sugar workers shot by police on June 16, 1948, during a strike at Plantation Enmore; five cutlasses mounted on the memorial each bear the name of one of the dead. Prime Minister Forbes Burnham unveiled it on June 19, 1977, the year after Henriques's death.

== Postage stamps ==
After the West Indies won the first Cricket World Cup in England in June 1975, the Caribbean Community's ministerial council, meeting in Jamaica the following month, agreed that a commemorative stamp issue should be released throughout the Community. The two designs chosen for the issue were by Henriques; several territories released them in 1976, on different dates and in a range of denominations. The design for the lower denomination combines a regional map, on which participating states are marked in red, with stumps and two crossed bats; the higher denomination depicts the Prudential Cup trophy. Saint Christopher-Nevis-Anguilla, Saint Lucia and Trinidad and Tobago also issued miniature sheets containing both stamps within a decorative border. Guyana's pair was issued on August 3, 1976. Antigua, which had marked the victory with its own set in 1975, used a different design by Julian Vasarhelyi.

== Death ==
A few weeks after Guyana released the cricket stamps, Henriques's body was discovered in his Fulton Court apartment, at the corner of Church and Irving streets in Georgetown; he had been killed. As of 2023, the killing remained unsolved.

== Legacy ==
In 2007, Terence Roberts described Henriques as one of Guyana's greatest abstract painters and suggested that, had he lived, he might have become the country's foremost abstract painter. His paintings remain in the National Collection and have been shown in several exhibitions at Castellani House, including Circa 1966 in 2005, the 2015 survey of abstract art in the National Collection, and a September 2016 display of River's Edge. River's Edge was also reproduced as the cover art of the second volume of the journal Caribbean Quilt.
