= Cummingsburg =

- Ward
- Location within Guyana
- Coordinates: 6°48′59.01″N 58°9′36.12″W
- Country: Guyana
- City: Georgetown

Population (2012)
  - Total: 2,667

Cummingsburg, or historically Cumingsburg, is a ward in Georgetown, Guyana. It began as 500-acre plantation, La Bourgade about 1759. When Thomas Cumming, a Scotsman, bought the property, he developed a town plan with residential and commercial lots and streets. The town layout was modified after a fire that burnt much of the town in 1864. Today, it is the site of several museums, including a national and anthropological museum.

== History ==
Jaques Salignac established 500-acre plantation, La Bourgade, about 1759 after having received approval for a grant by the Court of Policy. It was renamed Plantation La Bourgade Cummingsburg after it was purchased in 1807 by Scotsman Thomas Cumming. A church was established in Cummingsburg by the London Missionary Society by 1814. Dorothy Thomas, also known as Miss Doll, was considered the head of the "colored class", who was considered wealthy and had the "deportment of an empress". She owned property in Cummingsburg and by 1832 had 51 enslaved people, which were employed by here as huckstresses. Thomas lived on her cotton estate called Kensington on the coast and in Georgetown in a "splendidly furnished house".

An asylum was established in Cummingsburg by 1859, and Queens College Grammar School was established by 1866. On July 5, 1864, a fire spread through Georgetown and destroying much of South Cummingsburg, which became known as the "burnt district", and within days planning began to rebuild the area with an improved plan, as well as improvements to Northwestern Cummingsburg. For instance, plans were made to change the layout of the house lots and streets, including the addition of new streets. There were also plans to ensuring that there was sufficient infrastructure to support expansion.

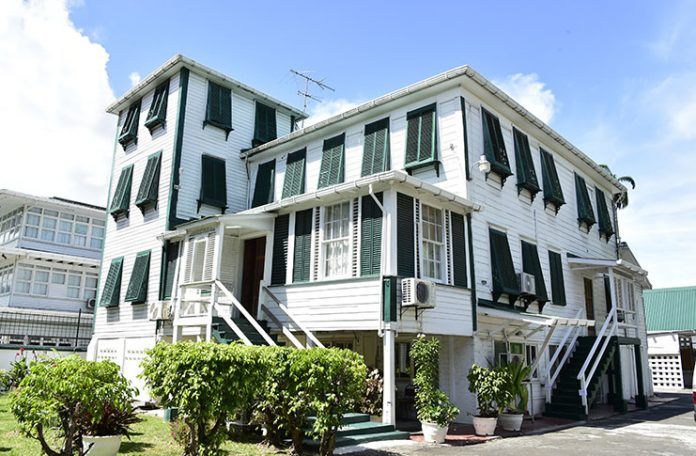
Valerie Rodway House, on 94 Carmichael Street, Cummingsburg, Georgetown, Guyana. The building - previously the home of the Ministry of Foreign Affairs and an annex to the Governor's house - was commissioned by the Guyanese government in honour of the composer, Valerie Rodway, on February 12, 2019.

A town two miles in circumference, it was regularly arranged and had fresh water reservoirs that were stocked with small fish. Luke M. Hill later had Lotus lilies and Victoria Amazonica planted in the bodies of water. At the end of the 19th century, neighborhoods throughout Georgetown were cleared of old, dilapidated slum housing. In Cummingsburg, housing was lost for the expansion of the Promenade Gardens, where in 1897, the Main Street reservoir was filled up and made into a walkway called the Queen Victoria Promenade, in honor of the queen's Diamond Jubilee. It is now named Main Street Avenue. Other reservoirs were covered as well at a later date.

Andrew Carnegie, a Scottish-American philanthropist and industrialist, provided the money for the construction of a public library in 1909. Initially, it was partially a museum with sections for History, Anthropology, and Economic Science. By 1951, the library occupied the entire building.

By the early 20th century, the ward was populated by Afro-Guyanese, Portuguese, a few of the Indo-Guyanese, and some of the area's few Europeans. The Europeans were primarily those of British heritage, who were also the most financially secure within Georgetown. The ward had pockets of upper-class residences. Infracture indicated the degree to which there were people with stable finances, based upon race, class and ethnicity. Cummingsburg was the only ward to have concrete-lined drains by 1912. The area's public health department was located in Cummingsburg, one of the areas that benefited from an aggressive plan to curb mosquitos in the early 20th century.

== Areas of interest ==
- Walter Roth Museum of Anthropology
- Guyana National Museum

== Notable people ==
- Wordsworth McAndrew (1936–2008), folklorist
