= Valerie Rodway =

Guyanese composer

Valerie Muriel Rodway
- Born: February 19, 1919. New Amsterdam, Guyana
- Died: August 1970 (aged 51)
- Occupations: Composer of cultural and national music
- Known for: Patriotic Guyanese compositions
- Notable work: Arise, Guyana; Kanaïma; Let Freedom Awaken
- Awards: Wordsworth McAndrew Award (2002); Cacique Crown of Honor (CCH)

Valerie Muriel Rodway (February 12, 1919 – August 1970) was a Guyanese composer of cultural and patriotic songs, inspired by the events leading up to Guyana's independence in 1966. She is best known for composing music to accompany Guyana national poetry, like Arise, Guyana, Kanaïma, and the Martin Carter's Guyanese Independence poem Let Freedom Awaken. For the next two decades, school children were taught the songs she and others composed to inspire patriotism and cultural affinity. She selected the poetry for her compositions based upon her principles and values, first developed among her parents and siblings.

She has been considered Guyana's greatest composer of patriotic and national music, and among the best composers from Guyana of the 20th century, generally and among composers of classical music. She was awarded the Wordsworth McAndrew Award posthumously in 2002. In 2019, she was awarded the Cacique Crown of Honor, one of the highest honors of Guyana. The National Trust of Guyana building in Cummingsburg, Georgetown, has been renamed the Valerie Rodway House in her honor.

She was married multiple times, yet had no children of her own. She was described as a caring, good mother by her stepdaughter, Dr. Cicely Rodway, the daughter of James Rodway. James, her second husband, created Guyana the Free with her. She taught music at a school in Georgetown, Guyana, and was a pianist known for musical collaborations with other renowned Guyanese musicians.

== Personal life ==
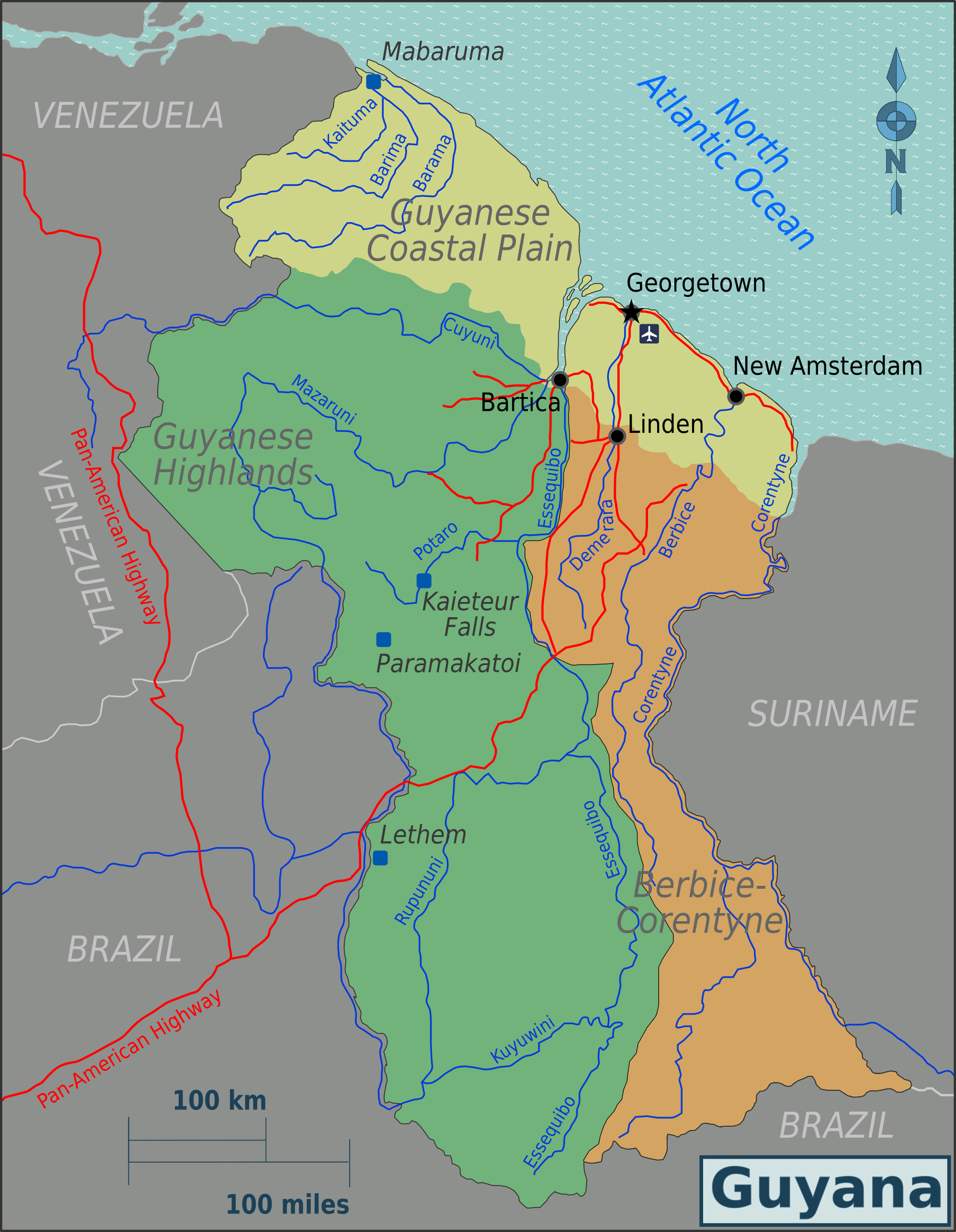
Guyana regions map

Valerie Fraser, born on February 12, 1919, in New Amsterdam, Guyana, was the fifth of eight children and the fourth daughter. (Note: Valerie Rodway's siblings were Lucille Warton, the first Guyanese principal of Carnegie School of Home Economics and Guyana Consul in the United States. Other siblings were Dr. Ovid Fraser, Aubrey Fraser, Granville "Vil" Fraser, Burchell Fraser, Hyacinth Godette, and Mae Cholmondeley.) Her mother, Jane Elizabeth Fraser, was born in Berbice-Corentyne. Her father, Newton Berthier Fraser, was born in Essequibo (now part of Guyana). Among the fourth generation of mariners in his family, he was known as "Capo" because he was a captain and owner of schooners and sloops that transported goods in and out of the Caribbean. Within British Guiana, sugar was transported to Georgetown from plantations in Berbice. He transported rice, supplies, and passengers from British Guiana to Barbados. White marl was transported from Barbados to British Guiana, where it was used for Georgetown's streets.

Parris Britton, her maternal ancestor, bought and held land that, following his death, became a source of income to his descendants. (Note: Valerie Rodway's maiden name was Fraser. She descended from a Barbadian immigrant and leather worker, Parris Britton, who came to Berbice about 1816. He arrived after the Dutch ceded Demerara and Berbice to the British. Britton began by making leather goods for sugar plantation owners for their horses and mules—such as saddles, harnesses, and stirrups—that transported sugar in British Guiana. As he became successful, he invested in livery stables and estates. He was the first owner of The White House in New Amsterdam, later to become the Strand Hotel.) In the 1930s, the income-earning property helped the Frasers recover following devastating hurricanes—which destroyed her father's schooners and sloops—and throughout the Great Depression.

According to her sister Lucille Wharton, Valerie, then a toddler, would wander away from the family’s home and visit a neighbour to "tinkle the keys" of the piano. Valerie had an interest in music, and her musical ability was developed by her music teachers—Edna Jordan, Eleanor Kerry, Winifred McDavid, and Ruby McGregor. She obtained a Licentiate of the Royal Academy of Music (LRCM) from the Royal Academy of Music in London. She became a good friend of future musician Lynette Dolphin who, with her sister, were taken into the Fraser family home after the death of her mother, Clarice de Weever Dolphin, in 1936. Lynette influenced Rodway's musical focus. The Fraser family valued service to the nation, respect, tenacity, and concern for others.

In 1958, as Valerie Warner, (Note: By 1949, Valerie was married to someone with the surname Warner.) she married the poet and teacher James "Sonny" Rodway, a grandson of the Guyanese historian James Rodway. (Note: After James Rodway earned his teacher's certificate and Bachelor's Degree in London, he taught at St. Vincent Grammar School. One of his students, Derek Walcott, dedicated Epitaph for the Young: XII Cantos (1949) to James. It tells of "a teacher faced with the bewildering hybridity of the Caribbean classroom". Walcott created the James Rodway Memorial Prize in his honor. Besides teaching in Saint Vincent, James also taught in Saint Lucia and Guyana. He taught at Queen's College, Guyana until about 1963, when he retired. She attended St. Peter's African Methodist Episcopal.) James Rodway's children were her stepchildren. Dr Cicely Rodway, her stepdaughter, called her a good mother who was gentle and kind. She had no children of her own. She died in August 1970 and was survived by one sibling, Ovid Fraser.

== Career ==
Carve our own fate, unmoved by distraction, prejudice and hate.

— Guyana the Free,
written and composed by Valerie and James Rodway,

Rodway was a music teacher at the St. Ambrose Primary School in Alberttown, Georgetown for many years. She composed some of the country's most recognized cultural and patriotic songs and has been considered Guyana's greatest composer of national music. Guyana the Free, written by Rodway and her husband James Rodway, was submitted for the competition for the national song of Guyana.

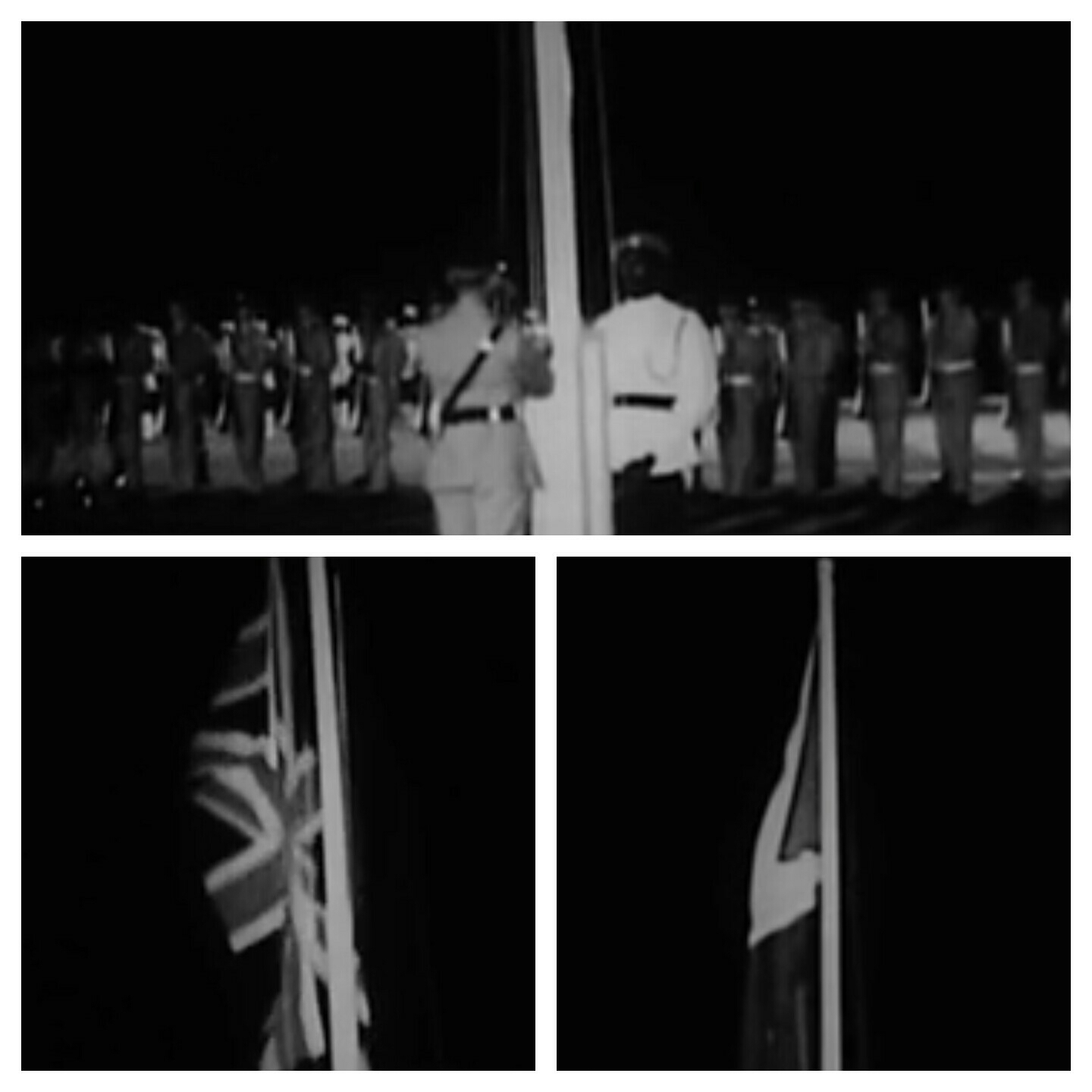
Guyana Independence, taking down the flag of the United Kingdom, and replacing it with the Flag of Guyana, May 26, 1966. Guyana's fight for independence was inspiration for Rodway's national, patriotic music.

She composed the music for Walter MacArthur Lawrence's poem "O Beautiful Guyana"; J. W. Chinapen's poem "Arise, Guyana"; and Vere T. Daly's "Hymn for Guyana's Children", considered one of the country's national songs. The poem "Let Freedom Wake Him" by Martin Carter, which she put to music in a combined syncopated-blues style, was a call for solidarity and action: "Give me your hand Comrade! Do not cry little one do not cry. This is the bond we made in the dark gloom about us, Hand in Hand, Heart in heart, strength in strength." She composed the music for "There Runs a Dream"; "Kanaima"; "The Weeding Gang", where the words were written by C. E. J. Ramcharitar-Lalla; and "Water Music", with words written by A. J. Seymour.

She composed most of her music during the 1960s, as Guyana moved towards and achieved its independence from the United Kingdom in 1966. For the next two decades, school children learned national, patriotic songs in schools, like "Guyana the Free". School children copied the words to national songs into special exercise books.

External videos
- O Beautiful Guyana
- Guyana the Free
- Hymn For Guyana's Children (youth steel orchestra)

Her music—composed for schools, music festivals, and large choirs—was influenced by her civic values, creativity, and the changes that her country experienced as it transitioned from a colonial territory to an independent country. She selected poetry that supported the racially-diverse new country with the values of "service to the nation, respect for the heritage, [and] the creation of a just and caring society", according to Vibert Cambridge, President of the Guyana Cultural Association of New York. According to the Stabroek News, her work represents pride in her country, its natural resources, and first peoples—expressed through diverse musical genres.

Guard well our sacred heritage / That it may thrive from age to age / Guyana, Blessed Guyana, be / Proud of your glorious destiny

— "Arise, Guyana", words by J. W. Chinapen,

She composed test pieces for the British Guiana Music Festival, which was established in 1952 by Lynette Dolphin, and music festivals held by other organizations. She "jammed", or played jazz music, with Sonny Rodway and the jazz pianist Douglas Harper before 1950. She also played jazz with Robert Frank and Iggy Quail. She was a member of the British Guiana Music Teachers' Association, where she lectured on classical composers Frédéric Chopin, Robert Schumann, and Franz Schubert around 1949. In 1978, a book was published of three of her classical compositions and twenty of her songs entitled National Songs Composed by Valerie Rodway.

== Awards and legacy ==
She was awarded the Wordsworth McAndrew Award posthumously in 2002 and the Cacique Crown of Honor (CCH), one of the highest honours of Guyana, in 2019.

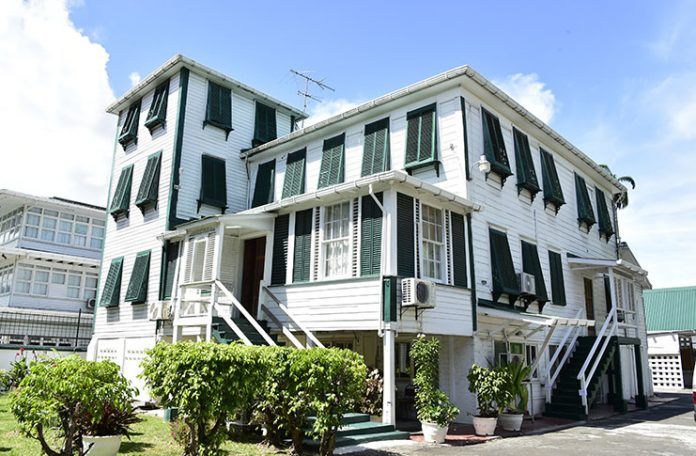
Valerie Rodway House, on Carmichael Street, Georgetown. The building - previously the home of the Ministry of Foreign Affairs and an annex to the Governor's house - was renamed by the Guyanese government in honour of the composer, Valerie Rodway, on February 12, 2019.

The National Trust of Guyana building was renamed the Valerie Rodway House in 2019 to honor her work and life. Renamed in conjunction with a celebration of the 100th anniversary of her birth, the event was led by the Ministry of the Presidency (MoTP). A speaker at the occasion, Dr. Vibert Cambridge, Professor in the School of Media Arts Studies at Ohio University, called her a "national treasure" who "found her inspiration in nature, the human struggle and Guyanese poetry". President David A. Granger said of her, "Valerie Rodway’s talent is that she moved beyond ethnicity; she moved beyond religion; she moved beyond the prejudices of being urban or rural and she helped us to discover our Guyanese-ness. When you read what she wrote and listen to what was played, there's no trace of prejudice. This is all about Guyana; all about us."

External image
- Image of commemorative stamps of Valerie Rodway

The Postmaster General of Guyana announced the release of 2019 commemorative stamps of Rodway by the Guyana Post Office Corporation (GPOC). The manuscript for O Beautiful Guyana was presented to the National Archives for preservation.
