= William Mackenzie & Co. =

William Mackenzie & Co. was a Scottish slave trading firm. The firm was located in Demerara, in the Cumingsburg district of the town. The firm consisted of four partners; William Mackenzie, James Crawford Macleod in Demerara, George Baillie and John Jaffray in St. Vincent.

== Trade ==
Bailie and Jaffray, through George Bailie & Co. of St Vincent, were responsible for bringing enslaved Africans to the Caribbean. Bailie was owner of several estates situated in the island of St Vincent in the West Indies, including Sion Hill Estate, Carapan Estate and Carriere Estate.

These enslaved people were then sold at auction by Mackenzie and Mecleod in their Demerara sale room.

== Bankruptcy ==
Baillie and Jaffrey were declared bankrupt by 1806, resulting in the firm being placed in the hands of trustees. Macleod and Mackenzie subsequently returned to the United Kingdom for legal proceedings relating to their own financial problems and bankruptcy. By 1810 Mackenzie had been declared bankrupt and his property, including his shares in estates in Demerara and Trinidad were put up for sale.
