= Frederick Bury =

English cricketer

Personal information
- Full name: Frederick William Bury
- Born: 26 February 1836; Radcliffe-on-Trent, Nottinghamshire, England
- Died: 4 July 1885 (aged 49); Bishop's Stortford, Hertfordshire, England
- Batting: Right-handed
- Bowling: Right-arm medium
- Relatives: Thomas Bury (brother); William Bury (brother)

Domestic team information
- Years: Team
- 1864/65–1865/66: Demerara (British Guiana)

Career statistics
Competition	First-class
Matches	2
Runs scored	17
Batting average	4.25
100s/50s	0/0
Top score	8
Balls bowled	36
Wickets	5
Bowling average	19.00
5 wickets in innings	0
10 wickets in match	0
Best bowling	2/?
Catches/stumpings	2/–
- Source: CricketArchive, 22 December 2014

Frederick Maxwell Bury (26 February 1836 – 4 July 1885) was an English cricketer who played two first-class matches for Demerara, an antecedent of the present Guyanese national side, while resident in British Guiana in the 1860s.

Bury was born in Radcliffe-on-Trent, Nottinghamshire, in 1836, where his father was the vicar. He was the second of three brothers who all played first-class cricket – Thomas William (1831–1918) played for Cambridge University, and William (1839–1927) played for Cambridge University, Nottinghamshire, and Gentlemen of the North. Frederick Bury made his debut for Demerara in what was retrospectively considered the inaugural first-class match in the West Indies, played against Barbados at the Garrison Savannah, Bridgetown, in February 1865. In that match, he opened the batting with Calvin Gilbert in each innings, but scored only seven runs across two innings as Demerara was dismissed for 22 and 38 – no Demeraran made double figures. Bury took two wickets in Barbados' innings of 74 and 124, with Barbados winning the match by 138 runs.

In the return fixture, at the Parade Ground, Georgetown, in September 1865, Bury and Gilbert, the two opening batsmen of the previous match, batted much lower in the batting order. The match was again a low-scoring encounter, with Demerara faring better than the previous encounter, eventually winning the match by two wickets after an unbeaten 39 not out from replacement opener William Watson. Bury took a single wicket in Barbados' first innings, that of Augustus Smith, but went wicketless in the second innings. Bury eventually returned to England, dying at Bishop's Stortford, Hertfordshire, in July 1885, aged 49.
