= McAndrews =

McAndrews may refer to:

- McAndrews, Kentucky
- Brian McAndrews, American business executive
- James McAndrews (1862–1942), U.S. Representative from Illinois
- McAndrews, Held & Malloy, Chicago law firm

== See also ==
- McAndrew
