= MacAndrew =

MacAndrew or Macandrew is a Scottish surname. Irish forms of the name include Mac Aindréis and Mac Aindriú. The name was assumed by a branch of the Irish Barrett family. In Ireland, the surname is mainly found in the counties of Mayo and Donegal.

== People ==
- Charles MacAndrew, 1st Baron MacAndrew (1888–1979), Scottish politician
- Hector MacAndrew (1903–1980), Scottish fiddler
- Henry Macandrew (1866–1919), British Army general
- James Macandrew (1819–1887), New Zealand ship-owner and politician
- James Orr MacAndrew (1899–1979), Scottish politician
- Jennie Macandrew (1866–1949), New Zealand pianist, organist, music teacher and conductor
- Robert MacAndrew (1802–1873), British merchant and ship-owner, marine dredger, Fellow of the Royal Society, naturalist and collector of shells
- Baron MacAndrew, of the Firth of Clyde, title in the Peerage of the United Kingdom

== Places ==
- Macandrew Bay, New Zealand

== Things ==
- Empire MacAndrew, British grain ship

== See also ==
- McAndrew, variant spelling
- Mac Andrew, Australian rules footballer
