= William Bury (cricketer) =

English cricketer, clergyman, and welfare administrator

William Bury (14 October 1839 – 21 May 1927) was a clergyman, welfare administrator and a cricketer who played first-class cricket for Nottinghamshire and Cambridge University between 1860 and 1862. He was born in Radcliffe-on-Trent, Nottinghamshire and died at Borough Green in Kent.

Educated at Trinity College, Cambridge, Bury played cricket as a right-handed middle-order batsman. He played for Cambridge University in matches in 1860, 1861 and 1862, appearing in the University Match against Oxford University in the last two seasons, though he made little impact. In both 1861 and 1862, Bury played for Nottinghamshire when the university cricket season was over, and in 1862 he played a final match for a "Gentlemen of the North" side against an equivalent team from the south of England, and in this, his last first-class match, he made a score of 121 in his second innings, almost doubling the number of runs he made in his career.

Bury graduated from Cambridge University in 1862 and was ordained as a Church of England deacon in 1863 and as a priest the following year. After brief incumbencies in Yorkshire and Dorset, he settled in Northamptonshire in 1867 and was successively rector of Haselbech to 1882 and Harlestone until 1907. In both parishes, Bury was involved with the Brixworth Poor Law union and was chairman of the board of guardians. As such, he was a leading figure in the implementation of a harsh local policy of "retrenchment" by which the Brixworth union attempted to minimise outdoor relief – payments made to poor people outside the central workhouse – eventually developing a series of "co-operative" welfare-to-work ventures, including subsistence agricultural work and a co-operative public house in Harlestone. Recent historians have argued that the policy was instigated largely at the insistence of the zealous Albert Pell, Member of Parliament for South Leicestershire and a Haselbech resident, with the connivance of the dominant local landowner and church benefice owner, Earl Spencer; they argue that it forced the rural poor into greater poverty or into migration to nearby towns such as Northampton. Bury was also the author of books on poor law reform that advocated the minimisation of outdoor relief and the establishment of welfare-to-work schemes. In parallel with his Poor Law guardianship, Bury was also chairman of the Brixworth Rural District from its formation as a unit of local government in 1894, though by that stage the dominance of the retrenchment view on the local Poor Law union was being actively challenged through the rise of the agricultural workers' union.

After 1907, Bury moved to be rector of Ickenham, Middlesex, retiring from that post in 1919.

An older brother, Thomas, also played cricket for Cambridge University and another brother, Frederick, played in the first first-class cricket match in the West Indies.
