= Parade Ground, Georgetown =

Cricket ground and parade ground in Georgetown, Guyana

Parade Ground
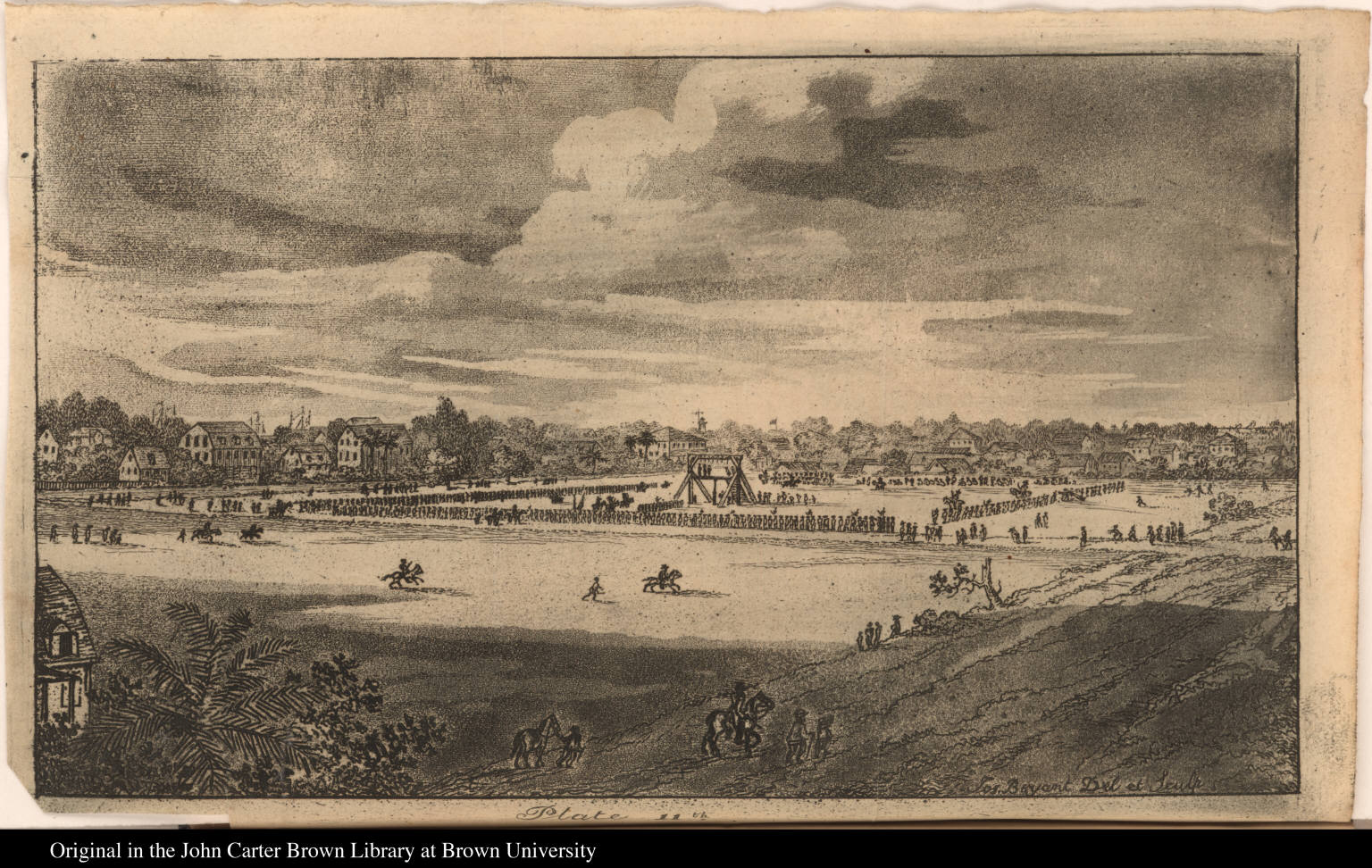
- The Parade Ground in 1823
- Interactive map of Parade Ground

Ground information
- Location: Georgetown, Guyana
- Country: Guyana
- Coordinates: 6.8155°N 58.1619°W
- Establishment: 1812

Team information
| Demerara | (1865/66–1882/83) |
- As of 22 April 2022; Source: Ground profile

The Parade Ground was a military parade ground and cricket ground in Georgetown, Guyana.

== History ==
In 1812 Hugh Lyle Carmichael, the Lieutenant Governor of Demerara and Essequibo, was concerned that the troops and militia of the colony had no place to parade. In October 1812, Carmichael accepted a grant of 16 lots of land from Thomas Mewburn in the Cumingsburg area of Georgetown in which to set up a parade ground. The parade ground was a site for executions of black slaves who had taken part in the Demerara rebellion of 1823. In 1843, representations were made by a Mr. Hackett to transform the parade grounds into an ornamental public gardens and build two temples named after Queen Victoria and Prince Albert, but this was not well supported. However, attitudes changed the following year when the local Gazette campaigned for the construction of a Government House and public gardens. This was hastened by the destruction of the beach promenade in 1846 and its general condition being described as "a disgrace to a British colony".

In 1851 the Town Council agreed to transform the parade grounds into a public garden, with a price of $1,000 being earmarked for the project, with the governor donating a further $500. A feature of the gardens was a cricket ground, was used as the homeground for the Georgetown Cricket Club, with the club having been granted permission by the Town Council and mayor to use the ground. The club erected a small pavilion and played their first match there in 1860 against the 21st Fusiliers. The ground played host to first-class cricket in 1865 when Demerara played Barbados. The ground played host to three further first-class matches for Demerara between 1871 and 1882. The 1882 fixture against Trinidad was notable for Edward Fortescue Wright scoring the first century in West Indian domestic first-class cricket. The Georgetown Cricket Club moved on from the Parade Ground in 1884 to establish their own ground, free from the control of the Town Council, taking their pavilion with them. Although cricket is no long played at the ground, the public gardens (which later became known as Independence Park) still exist.

== Records ==
=== First-class ===
- Highest team total: 168 all out by Demerara v Trinidad, 1882–83
- Lowest team total: 54 all out by Demerara v Trinidad, 1876–77
- Highest individual innings: 123 by Edward Fortescue Wright for Demerara v Trinidad, 1882–83
- Best bowling in an innings: 8–33 by E. G. Penalosa for Trinidad v Demerara, 1876–77
- Best bowling in a match: 12–54 by E. G. Penalosa, as above

== See also ==
- List of cricket grounds in the West Indies
