= James Rodway =

British-born historian, botanist and novelist

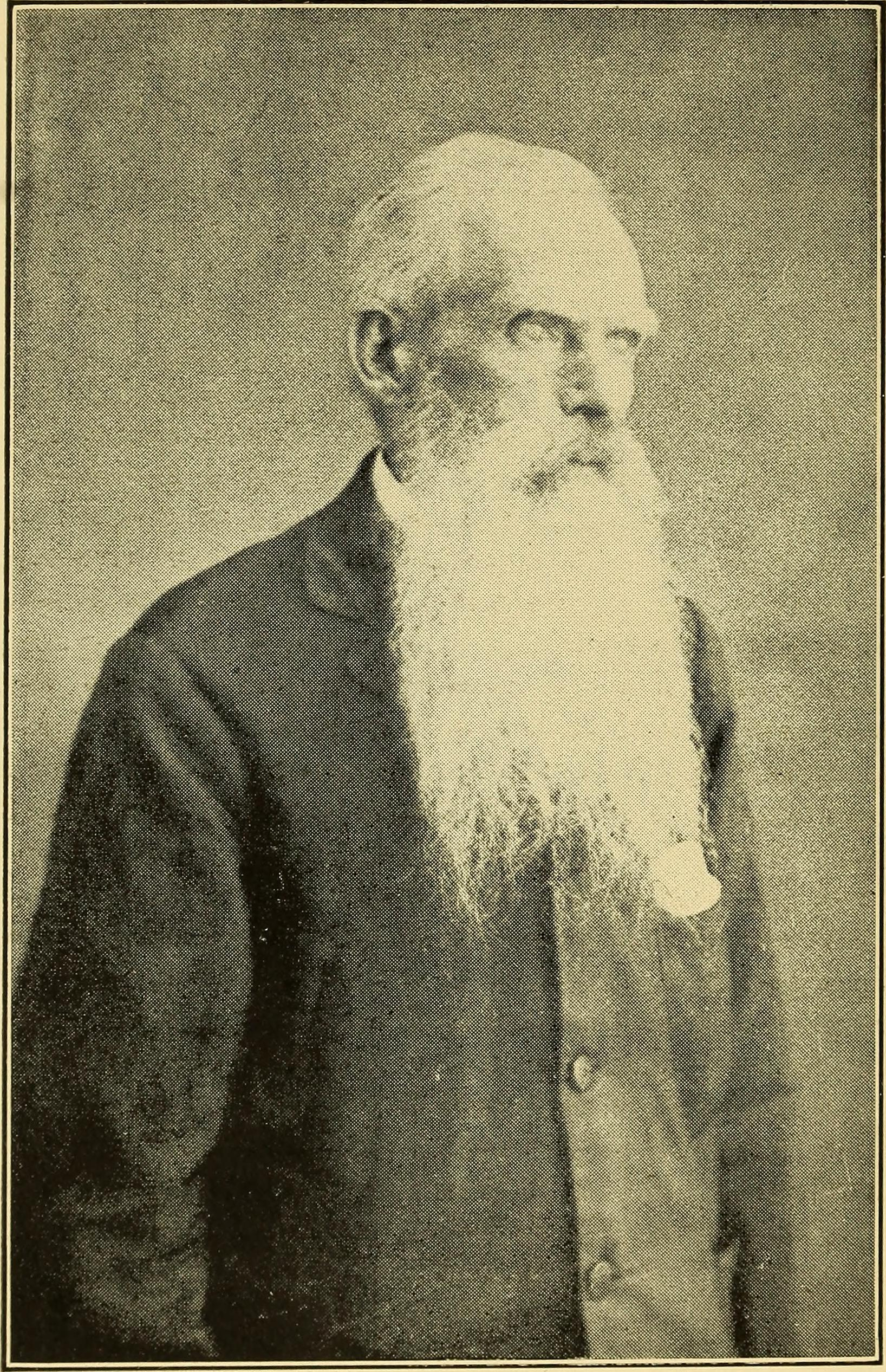
Rodway c. 1911

James Rodway (February 27, 1848 – November 19, 1926) was a British-born historian, botanist and novelist of British Guiana. Considered British Guiana's premier historian, Rodway helped to establish national institutions such as the Royal Agricultural and Commercial Society of British Guiana and the British Guiana Museum. A Fellow of the Linnean Society, in later years he served as Editor of the colony's literary and scientific journal, Timehri.

Rodway is the namesake of both a sub-species of Violaceous Euphonia – Euphonia Violacea Rodwayi, as named by Thomas Edward Penard – and the Gold Tetra, or Hemigrammus Rodwayi, named by Marion Durbin Ellis.

A History of British Guiana, from 1668 to the Present Time, Guiana: British, Dutch and French and Hand-book of British Guiana are considered some of Rodway's major works. In Guiana Wilds: A Story Of Two Women (1899), Rodway's only novel, is noted as one of the earliest works of fiction to emerge from the nation.

Rodway's works were instrumental in aiding the case for the British government against Venezuela during the Venezuelan Crisis of 1895.

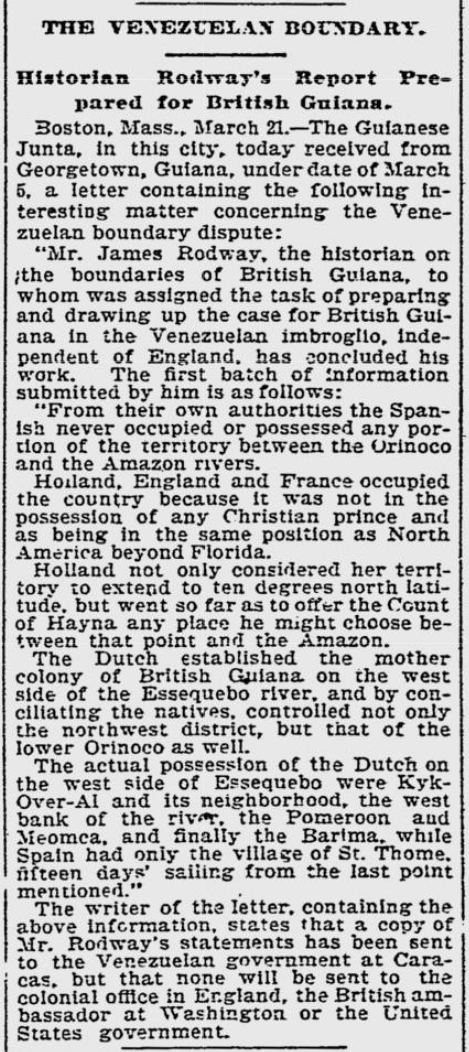
A report following the Venezuela Crisis of 1895 highlighting the work of historian James Rodway in building for the case of British Guiana.

== Early life ==
Born 27 February 1848 in Trowbridge, Wiltshire, England to James and Edith Rodway (née Harding), Jabez Rodway – later to take his father's first name – was one of nine children. His father was a hawker and his mother came from a local family of weavers. Aged 13, James began work as an apprentice with a local chemist, some years later taking a position as a pharmacy assistant in Hitchin, Hertfordshire. It was from here that Rodway responded to a newspaper advertisement calling for clerks overseas in British Guiana, inspired by his reading on exploration and studies of the tropics, including Charles Waterton's Wanderings in South America. Rodway was offered a position at Joseph Kleine & Co. and set sail aboard the R.M.S Seine on September 2, 1870, aged 22.

== Career ==
=== Work as a botanist ===
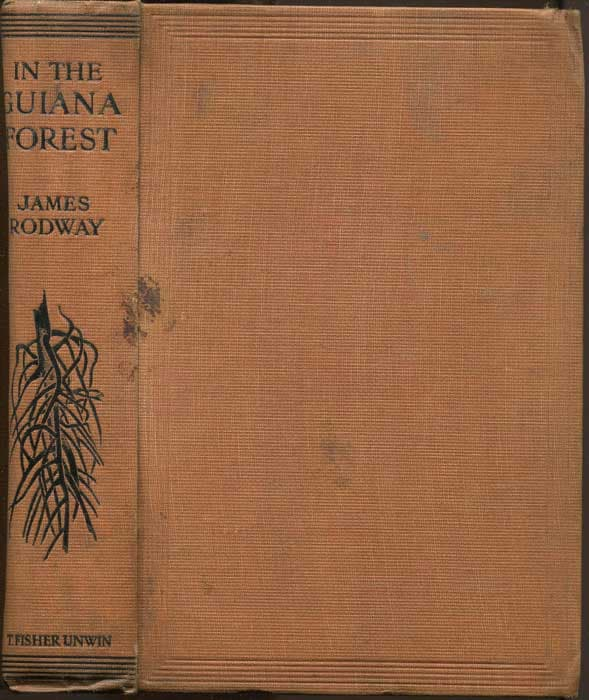
Hardback cover of Rodway's In The Guiana Forest, published by T. Fisher Unwin

Following his arrival in the capital city of Georgetown, James Rodway – as he was now known – worked four years for Joseph Kleine & Co. before becoming manager of a pharmacy. Alongside reading the few history books available on the colony, the works of Henry G. Dalton and George Hanneman Bennett, in order to better acquaint himself with his new home Rodway continued to cultivate the avid interest in botany that had begun back in England as a child. He now read much of what existed on the flora and fauna of British Guiana and the Americas. Along with this came the wider personal study of insects, fish, topography and more. In any time he was able to do so, Rodway took the opportunity to walk many miles to record local plant and animal life extensively; as early as 1871, he began the first of his frequent boat trips along rivers and creeks to the Guyanese interior where he would come into contact with both the native and the Boviander populations. These journeys, with Rodway's detailed journaling of his discoveries and observations along their course, were to later inform much of his written works. The keen botanist steadily amassed an extensive herbarium, all the contents of which were self-described. Meanwhile, Rodway became known for his development of various orchids and ferns in the greenhouse of the Georgetown home he purchased in 1880, and won first prize at a flower exhibition held in the city's Botanical Gardens.

Rodway was eventually approached by both James Thomson, Editor of The Argosy newspaper and Everard im Thurn, founder and first Editor of Timehri magazine – established in 1882 as the official publication of the nation's Royal Agricultural & Commercial Society. Thomson and Thurn encouraged him to put his acquired knowledge to wider use writing articles and studies for the respective institutions specific to the colony's wildlife as well its rural and Amazon-based communities. Until his death, almost no subsequent issue of Timehri would be published without one or more of Rodway's articles.

By the 1890s, Rodway was an established name in British Guiana in the field of botany. 'The Struggle for Life in the Forest' would be the article to establish Rodway in the wider world beyond the colony. Published in 1891 for Timehri and again for the Smithsonian Institution, it was highly remarked upon by W.T. Stead, in the Review of Reviews. That same year, on 17 December, Rodway was elected as fellow of the Linnean Society of London. These developments encouraged Rodway to propose a book to the London-based publishing company T. Fisher Unwin – one that would be devised primarily from his previous botanical articles. In the Guiana Forest – Studies of Nature in Relation to the Struggle for Life was subsequently published in 1894. With the positive reception to this book, Rodway established himself as an authority on the subject of British Guiana – in particular across the English-speaking world – even being referenced by the philosopher Herbert Spencer in his material. Throughout his life, as with his historical work, Rodway's writing featured in newspapers, journals and magazines from England to Australia.

=== Work as a historian ===
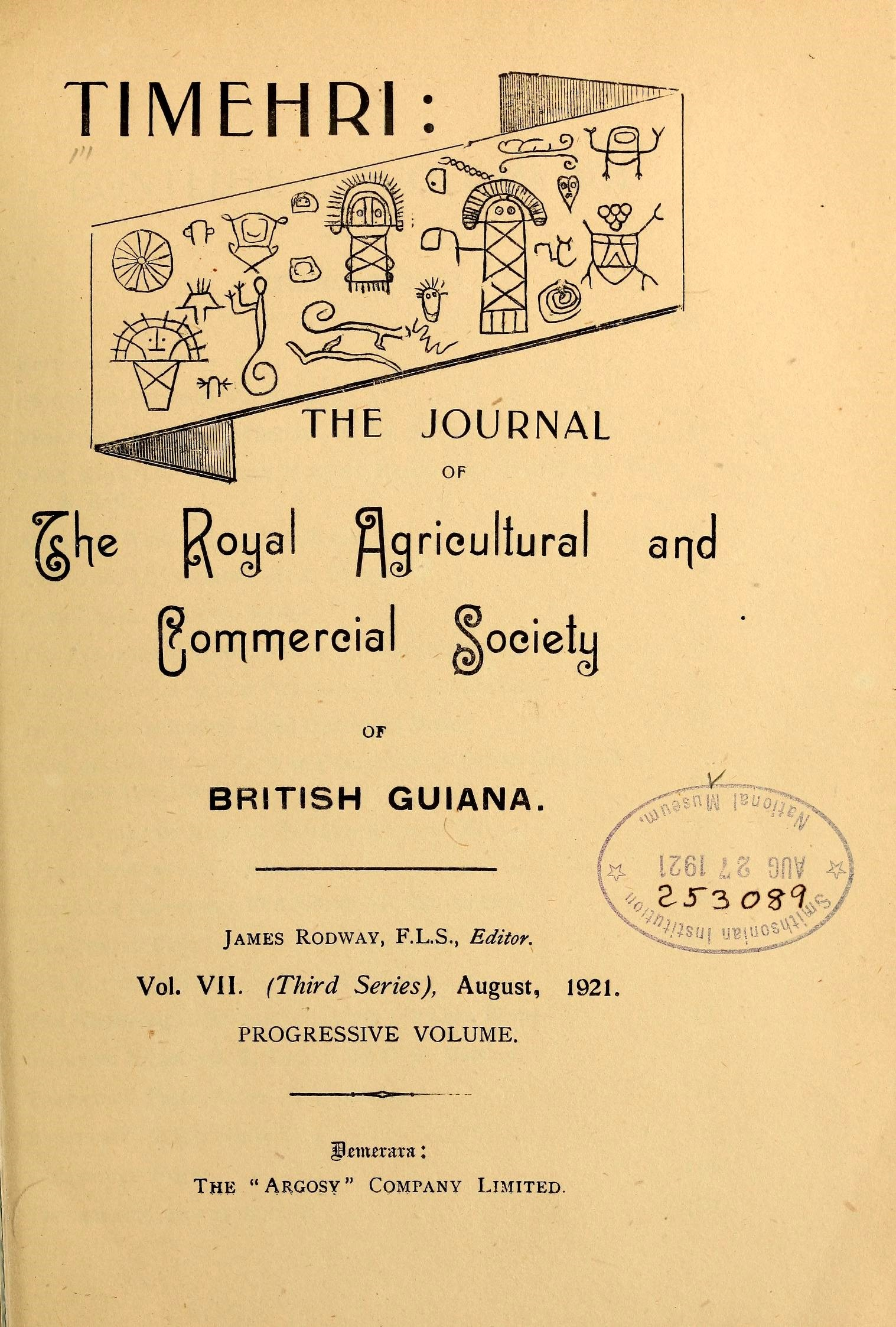
A 1921 issue of the Royal Agricultural & Commercial Society's science and literary publication, the Timehri Journal. James Rodway was Editor at this time – F.L.S stands for 'Fellow of Linnean Society'.

In his career as colony historian, James Thomson of The Argosy was again instrumental in encouraging Rodway to hone his talent for research to deliver content for the publication. Nicholas Darnell Davis, a colonial official of British Guiana, one-time Postmaster-General and later author, also encouraged Rodway to use his skill in archiving the nation's history. It was suggested Rodway begin this venture with an episodic series, charting British Guiana's historical development in chronological fashion. This ran in The Argosy from August 1885 through to March 1886.

Impressed by the evident dedication and detail to have gone into producing this extensive literary project, Charles Bruce – the colony's recently appointed Lieutenant Governor – enquired whether Rodway might consider compiling a catalogue from the extremely old and poorly maintained colonial documents in his office building, some dating back to the days of Dutch control over the territory. Rodway was enthusiastic and – after securing permissions from Governor Bruce to transcribe many of the documents from home – began the monumental task with the aid of a hired translator who would be able to decipher the old Hollandic dialect where necessary. The project would take months and ultimately see Rodway hand over the management of his pharmacy to his son full-time.

It would be access to these files – the first comprehensive English translation of testimonies and accounts recorded by members of the colony's former Dutch administration and plantocracy – that would lead Rodway to write what would be considered the most seminal literary history of British Guiana to date. A History of British Guiana, from 1668 To The Present Time, in three volumes (1891–1894), sought to clear up the inaccuracies of prior historians by closely comparing and referencing both Dutch and British records.

Rodway's later historical works include The West Indies and the Spanish Main (1896), Guiana: British, Dutch and French (1912), and The Story of Georgetown (published in 1903 and revised in 1920 – a special edition was presented to the Prince of Wales this same year on his tour visit to Georgetown).

=== Later years ===
Rodway held the positions of Assistant Secretary at the Royal Commercial & Agricultural Society (1886–1888), Librarian at the Royal Commercial & Agricultural Society and Curator of British Guiana Museum (1894–1899). In addition, Rodway was Editor of Timehri well into his older years.

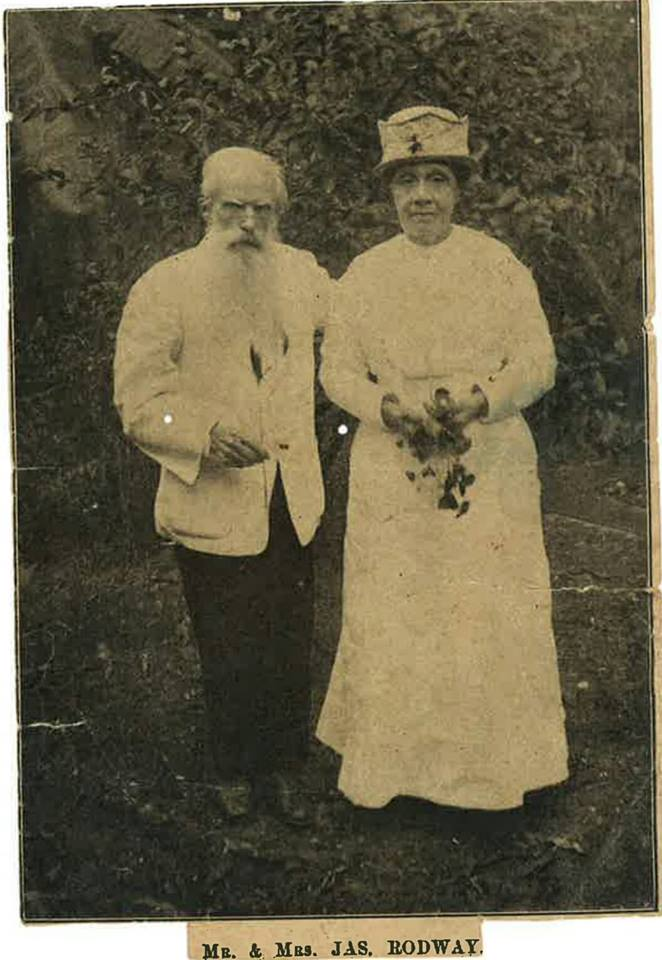
James Rodway and wife, Keturah (Kate) Rodway c. 1900s.

=== 50th anniversary ===
On 30 December 1920, James Rodway celebrated his 50th anniversary as a settler in British Guiana. He was honoured before friends and colleagues from across the country and beyond by Governor Sir Wilfred Collet at a meeting at the Royal Agricultural & Commercial Society. At the event Rodway was awarded an annuity of £50 (equivalent to £1,932 in 2025) – in recognition of his literary and scientific contribution to the colony. On this occasion, Rodway's last great work appeared in The Argosy: a revised 'The Story of Georgetown'.

== Personal life ==
Rodway married Keturah (Kate) Johanna Reedon in Georgetown on 13 February 1873. His marriage to the Guyanese-born Creole may have formed the inspiration for Rodway's only published fictional work: the novel In Guiana Wilds: A Study of Two Women (1898).

== Rodway family ==
Rodway's descendants have comprised many notable figures in the cultural, educational and political history of Guyana, as well as the wider Caribbean region.

Notable members of the Rodway family include James Rodway's grandsons, photographer Ed Rodway - known for his work with the Theatre Guild of Guyana - and James Alwyn ("Sonny") Rodway, a Queen's College educator, Education Officer for the island of St. Lucia and later mentor to Nobel Prize-winning poet Derek Walcott. Walcott would go on to establish the 'James Rodway Memorial Prize' for St. Lucian poets in his honour. 'Sonny' Rodway's second wife was Guyanese composer Valerie Rodway.

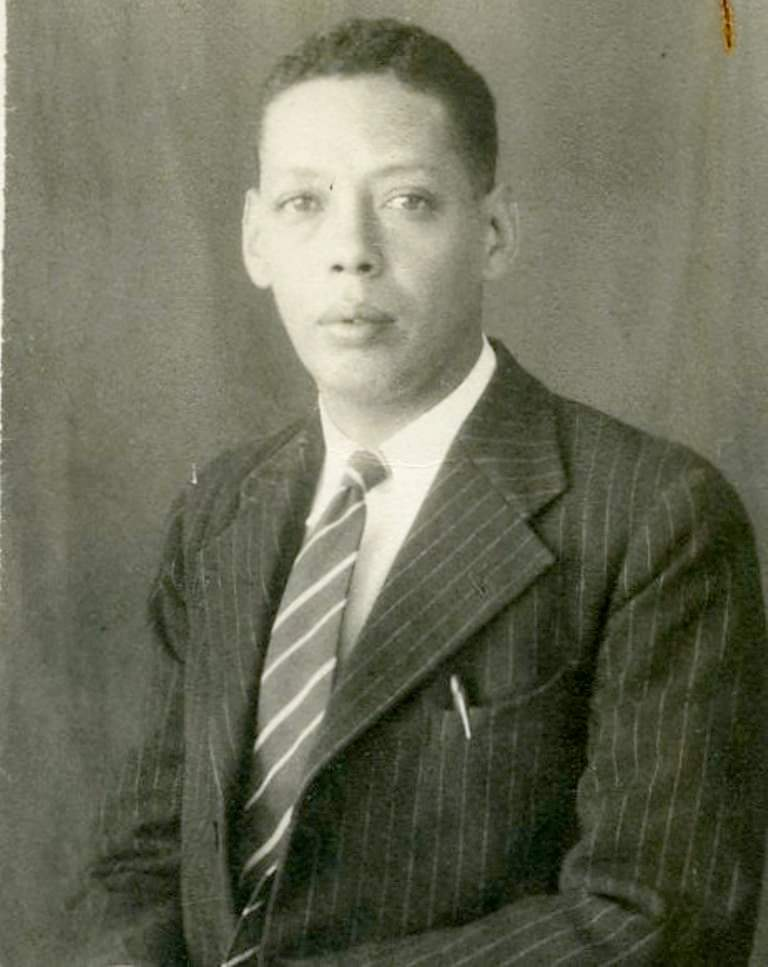
J.A. ('Sonny') Rodway. James Alwyn Rodway and Governor of British Guiana, Sir Patrick Muir Renison pictured for an official engagement. Queen Elizabeth II with Prime Minister Forbes Burnham. National composer, Valerie Rodway looks on (far right).

Great-grandsons include Adrian Rodway – a journalist central to events of the Jamaica Broadcasting Corporation strike of 1964, supported by Michael Manley – and political activist Brian Rodway, one of the founding members of the Working People's Alliance party and close confidant of Walter Rodney.

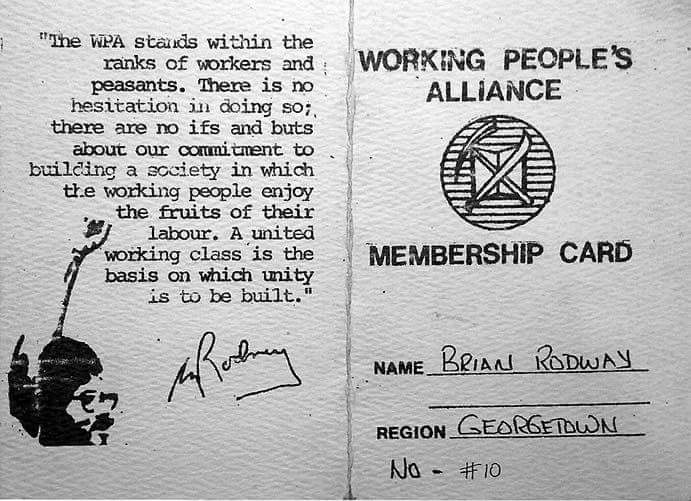
Brian Rodway WPA Identification Pass

Amongst Rodway's great-granddaughters is Professor Cicely Rodway, author of 'Sunstreams and Shadows' (2001).

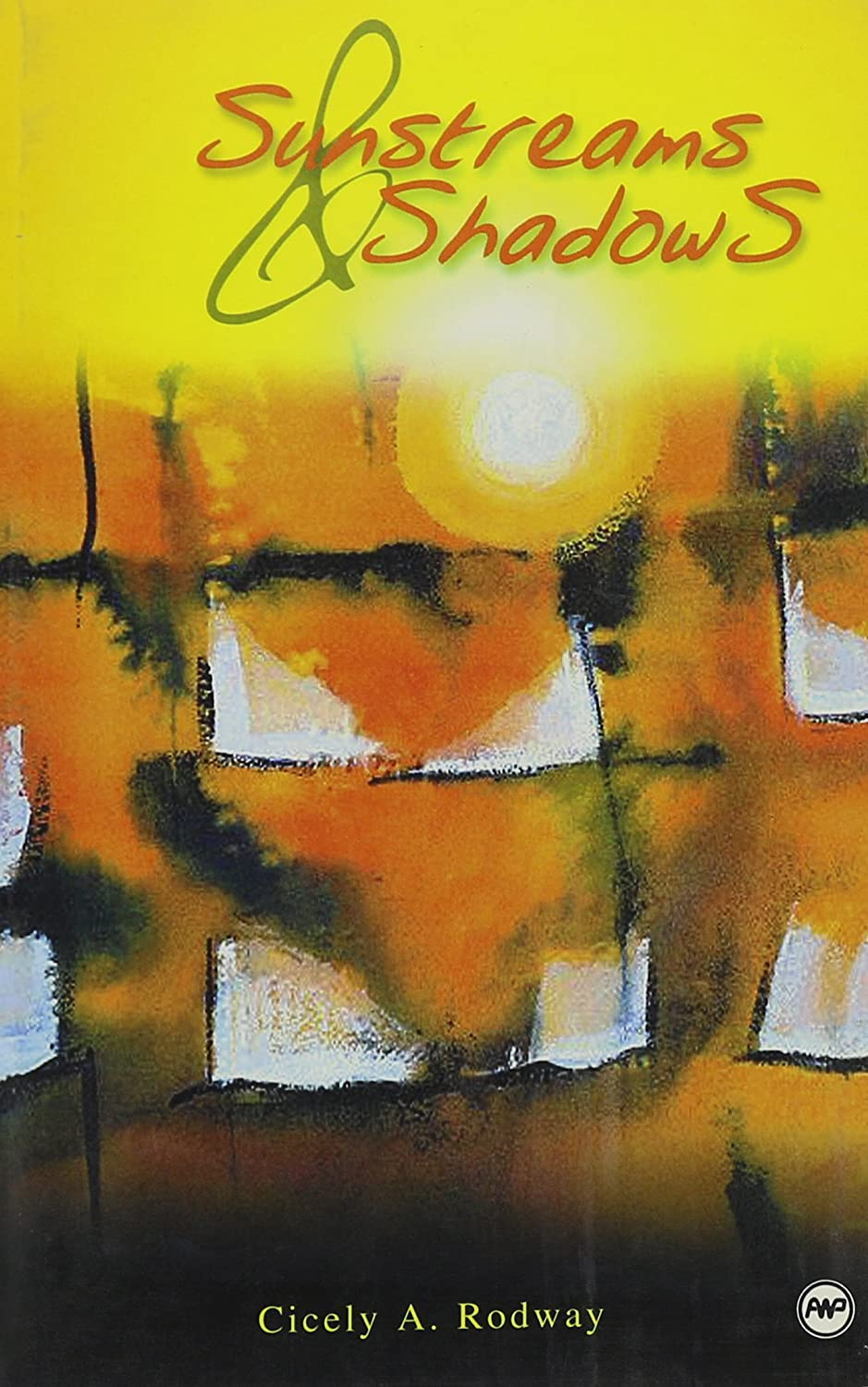
Sunstreams & Shadows by Dr. Cicely A. Rodway
