= Thomas Bury (cricketer) =

English cricketer

Personal information
- Full name: Thomas William Bury
- Born: 2 August 1831; Ordsall, Nottinghamshire
- Died: 10 February 1918 (aged 86); Kilburn, London
- Source: Cricinfo, 11 April 2017

Thomas William Bury (2 August 1831 – 10 February 1918) was an English clergyman and a cricketer who played five first-class matches for Cambridge University Cricket Club between 1853 and 1855. He was born at Ordsall, Nottinghamshire and died at Kilburn, London.

Bury was educated at Winchester College and Emmanuel College, Cambridge. As a cricketer, he appears to have been a lower-order batsman and a second-line bowler, though his batting and bowling styles are not known and with the limited survival of records from his era his precise bowling figures are also not known. He won a Blue by playing in the 1855 University Match for Cambridge against Oxford University, which was his last first-class game. A younger brother, William, also played cricket for Cambridge University and another brother, Frederick, played in the first first-class cricket match in the West Indies.

Bury graduated from Cambridge University with a Bachelor of Arts degree in 1856 and was ordained as a Church of England deacon in 1859 and as a priest in 1860. He served as the vicar of Attenborough with Bramcote, Nottinghamshire, from 1861 to 1875 and then as rector of Aisthorpe with West Thorpe, Lincolnshire to 1898; he retired to a curacy of a church in Hastings, East Sussex in 1900.

== See also ==
- List of Cambridge University Cricket Club players
