= Promenade Gardens =

Urban park in Georgetown, Guyana

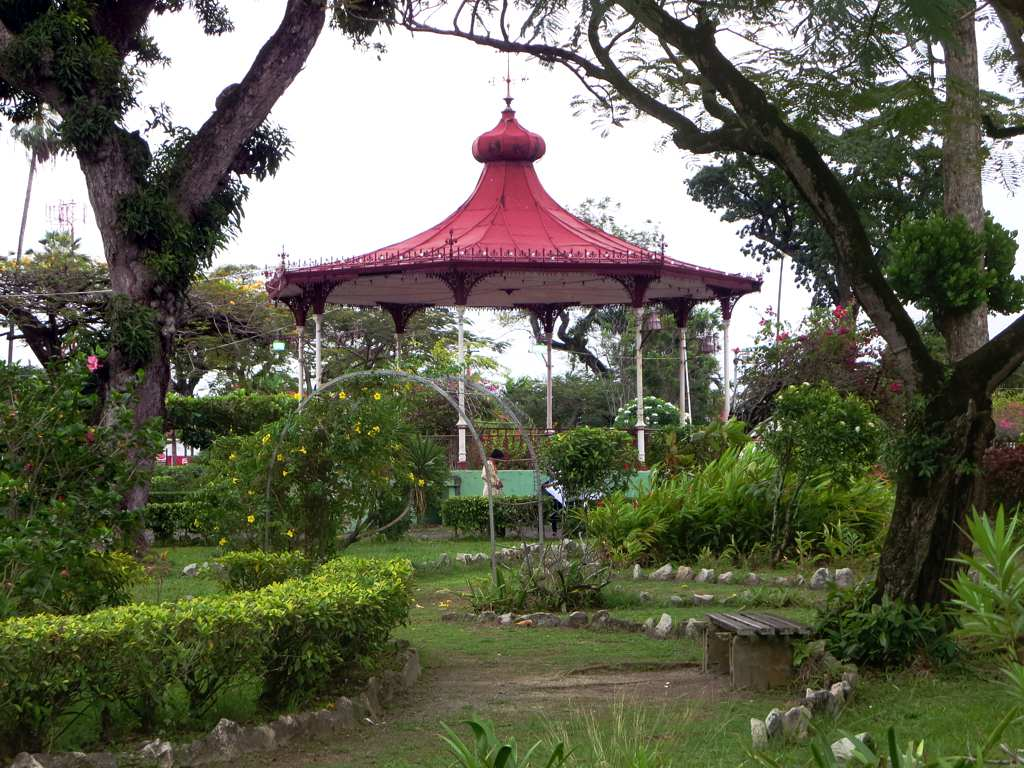
- Promenade Gardens bandstand
- Type: Urban park
- Location: Cummingsburg, Georgetown, Guyana
- Coordinates: 6.81661°N 58.16626°W
- Created: 19th century

Promenade Gardens is a garden in Georgetown, Guyana.

To the south is Independence Park (Parade Ground), the site of public execution of slaves who participated in the uprising of 1823. The park is separated from the gardens by Middle Street.

The park is bound by Carmichael Street to the west, across from which is the State House (president's residence).

The other public garden in Georgetown is the larger Botanical Gardens further from city centre. There is also the modern National Park in the north of the city.
