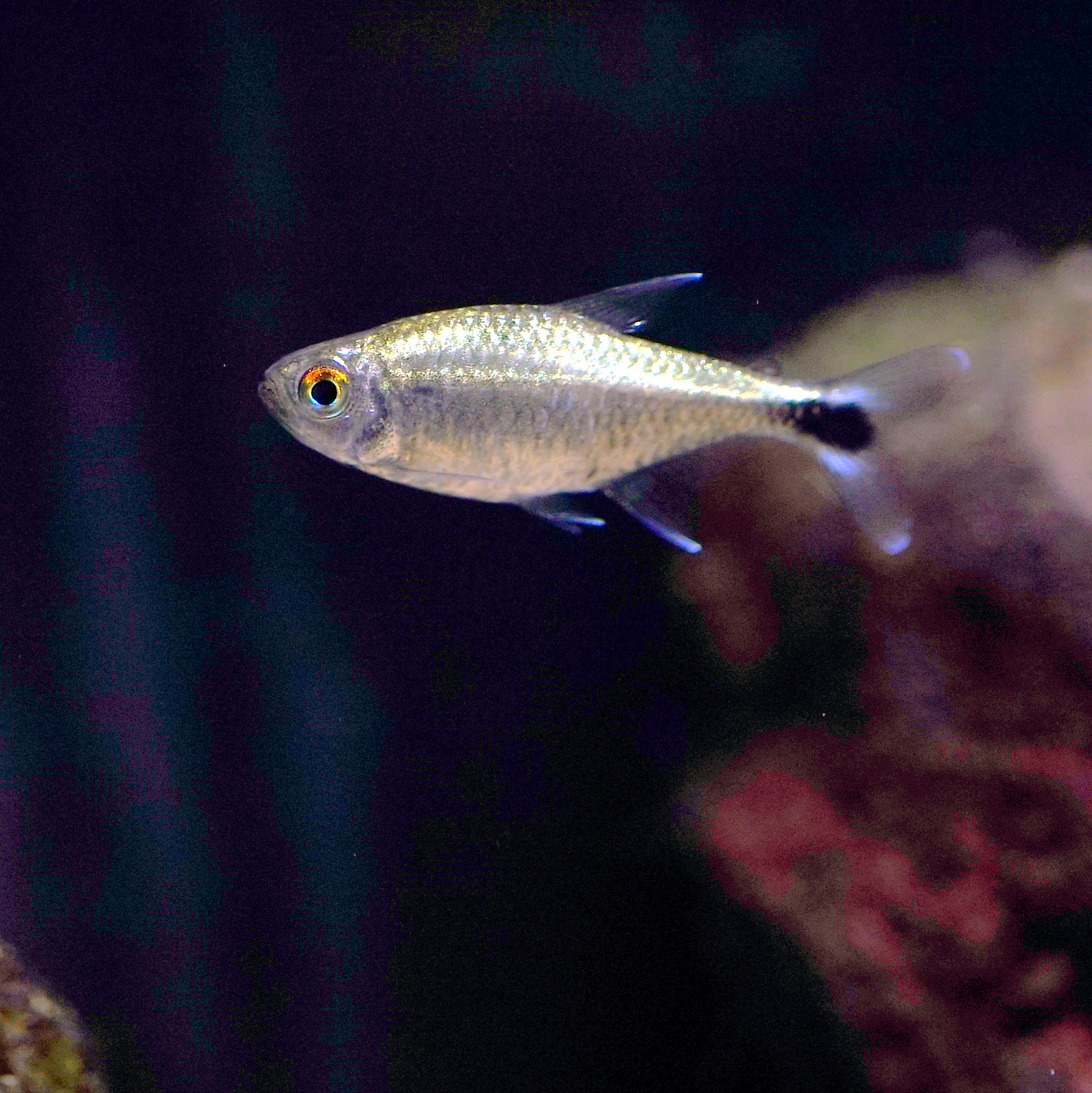

Conservation status
- Least Concern (IUCN 3.1)

Scientific classification
- Kingdom: Animalia
- Phylum: Chordata
- Class: Actinopterygii
- Order: Characiformes
- Family: Acestrorhamphidae
- Genus: Hemigrammus
- Species: H. rodwayi

Binomial name
- Hemigrammus rodwayi Durbin, 1909

= Gold tetra =

Species of fish

The gold tetra, or Rodway's tetra (Hemigrammus rodwayi), is a species of small freshwater ray-finned fish in the family Acestrorhamphidae, the American characins. This fish is found in lowland South America, where they are abundant in coastal floodplains. Their name comes from a powdery golden tint on their body that is thought to be caused by internal parasites. Gold tetras are peaceful, hardy, schooling community fish. Gold tetras have been successfully bred in captivity.

The patronym was given by Marion Durban Ellis in honor of James Rodway, a renowned naturalist of British Guiana, who aided Carl Eigenmann's collecting trips in South America.
