= Wordsworth McAndrew Award =

The Wordsworth McAndrew Awards are a series of awards given to Guyanese for cultural achievements. They were founded in 2002 and presented by the Guyana Folk Festival, an organisation based in America. They are named for Wordsworth McAndrew.

== Awardees ==
In 2002 there were 36 awardees, reflecting the number of years since Guyana's independence in 1966. The first recipients of the award were:

- S. R. R. Allsopp
- Ron Bobb-Semple
- Johnny Braff
- Maurice Braithwaite
- Negla Brandis
- E. R. Burrowes
- Pat Cameron
- Martin Carter
- Bertie Chancellor
- Megan Chan
- Nesbit Chhangur
- Lynette Dolphin
- Francis Quamina Farrier
- Robert Fernandes
- Terry Gajraj
- Roy Geddes
- Gary Girdhari
- Eddy Grant
- Stanley Greaves
- Bernard Heydorn
- Peter Kempadoo
- Vivian Lee
- Ivor Lynch
- Wordsworth McAndrew
- Dave Martins
- Sister Noel Menezes
- Valerie Rodway
- Bill "Bhagee" Rogers
- Olga Lopes Seales
- A. J. Seymour
- Raj Kumari Singh
- Shurland "King Fighter" Wilson
- The Atlanta Guyana Association
- The Link Show
- The Rajkumari Cultural Center
- Dem Two (Ken Corsbie and Marc Matthews)

The 37 awardees in 2003 were:

- Rudy Bishop (Chronicle Atlantic Symphony Steel Orchestra)
- David Campbell
- Tom Charles & The Syncopators
- Ivan Critchlow
- Mahadai Das
- Dennis DeSouza
- Des Glasford & Combo 7
- Guyana Music Teachers Association
- Guyana Police Male Voice Choir
- Ayube Hamid
- Annie Haynes
- Hilton Hemmerding
- Ram John Holder
- Loris Holland
- Rafiq Khan
- Lady Guymine (Monica Chopperfield)
- Lord Canary (Malcolm Corrica)
- Vesta Lowe
- Ian McDonald
- Billy Moore (William Moore)
- Clement E. Nichols
- Phillip Nichols
- Tony Phillips
- Roland Phillips
- Edith Pieters
- Billy Pilgrim
- Masse Lall Pollard
- Basil Rodrigues
- Hugh Sam
- Al Seales
- Bing Serrao & The Ramblers
- George Simmons & The Rhythmaires
- Trev Sue-a-Quan
- Tassa Explosion
- Nadira & Indranie Shaw
- Keith Waithe with Masse Lall Pollard

The awardees of the 2008 ceremony were:

- Andre Sobryan - Theatre
- Aubrey Cummings - Music
- Aubrey Williams - Painting
- Basil Hinds - Broadcasting
- Bert Rogers - Music
- Charlie Knights - Music
- Chuck Girard - Music
- Claire Goring - Cultural Promotion
- Clairmonte Taitt - Broadcasting
- Daphne Elaine Rogers - Drama
- David Dabydeen - Writing
- Denis Williams - Painting
- Desiree Edgehill - Drama
- Eddie Hooper - Music
- Eddie Rogers - Music
- Edgar Mittelholzer - Writing
- Henry Muttoo - Theatre
- Henry Rodney -Theatre
- Jan Carew - Writing
- John Agard & Grace Nichols - Writing
- John Rickford - Writing
- Keith Proctor - Music
- Malcolm Hall - Dance
- Marc Matthews - Theatre
- Michael Gilkes - Writing
- Moses Josiah - Music
- Philip Forrester - Music
- Pitra Pyari - Dance
- Rector Schultz - Music
- Romanie Kalicharran - Dance
- Ron Robinson - Theatre
- Rudolph Shaw - Theatre
- Sheik Sadeek - Writing
- Uncle Ramdhani - Music
- Victor Davson - Painting
- Victor Forsythe - Broadcasting
- Wilson Harris - Writing
- Wrickford Dalgetty - Music
