= Keith Waithe =

Guyanese musician, composer and teacher

- Born: Guyana
- Education: University of Surrey; Royal Military School of Music
- Occupations: Musician, composer and teacher
- Known for: Founder of Macusi Players
- Awards: Wordsworth McAndrew Award
- Website: www.keithwaithe.com

Keith Waithe is a Guyana-born musician, composer and teacher who has been based in the United Kingdom since 1977. He is best known as a flautist and founder of the Macusi Players – a world music jazz band whose name derives from the indigenous Guyanese Macushi people – and has been "acknowledged as the best flute player that Guyana has ever produced". His musical style explores a fusion of jazz, classical, African, Caribbean, Asian and Western influences, and he has also developed a technique he calls "vocal gymnastics", in which he uses the voice to reproduce percussive sounds. Music critic Kevin Le Gendre notes that Waithe "has single-mindedly pursued his own artistic agenda, developing a songbook that draws heavily on African-Caribbean and Asian folk traditions as well as jazz ingenuity in a manner not dissimilar to a large number of his forebears, of which Yusef Lateef is perhaps the most direct reference."

== Biography ==
Born in Guyana, the eldest of his parents' four children, Waithe grew up in Kitty, Georgetown. At the age of seven he was taught to play the trumpet by his father (Darnley van Herbert Waithe, who played in big bands at the time). This led to Waithe honing his skills on the instrument by joining the Salvation Army Band and later the Guyana Police Force Band, and he subsequently took up the flute, for which he "developed a passion". In 1973, he was awarded a British Council scholarship, which enabled him to study in England. He attended the University of Surrey and the Royal Military School of Music, Kneller Hall, where he gained an LRSM diploma and PGCE Teaching Certificate.

In the 1990s he set up Essequibo Music, of which he is Director, an organisation that oversees a range of contemporary Black British artists, storytellers, poets and musicians – among them Sandra Agard (storyteller/writer), Jo-Jo Yates (kora player/master drummer/percussionist), Darryl Lee Que (Caribbean drummer and percussionist) and Helen McDonald (vocalist) – who work in educational, cultural and performances arenas, running workshops and undertaking collaborations with teachers and community project workers. Its activities have included a residency at the Eden Project in Cornwall, an education workshop in Oxford's Pitt Rivers Museum, a series of African-themed workshops for the BBC Symphony Orchestra, as well as programmes for schools in deprived communities.

He also heads Keith Waithe and the Macusi Players, a group comprising musicians of Caribbean, South American, African and Indian heritage – Waithe is known to "passionately believe in supporting cross-cultural relationships". Using his collection of more than 200 flutes from around the world, he conjures up the sounds of animals and birds reminiscent of the tropical rainforests of his native Guyana. He has said: "...it's fascinating for me at this moment to be living in England and still be very much Guyanese. My band and I, we represent Britain, not only at home but in Europe as well. And that in itself is wonderful; for me to be able to do that ... but to also show the world that the Caribbean and South America is more than just Jamaica or Peru or Colombia; that Guyana, too, has a vibrant culture."

He makes frequent appearances at festivals in the UK, such as the Hay Festival, the Ealing Jazz Festival, Wessex Book Festival, and others. He has performed around the world, including in India, Denmark, Italy, Lithuania, Estonia, Sudan, Ghana, France, Geneva, Peru, Guyana, Columbia and the Cayman Islands and US, and has worked with such notable artists as Nitin Sawhney, Courtney Pine and percussionist Bosco de Oliveira. Recent activities include a 2015 national tour and the project "Fusion Journeys" in the V&A India Festival.

He has also been featured often on radio programmes such as BBC Radio 4's Midweek and Kaleidoscope, Night Waves on BBC Radio 3, Mad About Music on Radio 2 and the BBC World Service's The Forum.

In November 2008, Waithe went to the Commonwealth Heads of Government meeting in Kampala, Uganda, where he took part in a programme of cultural events that involved bringing together classically trained British musicians with traditional Ugandan music players, as well as working with the African Children's Choir.

Waithe has been involved with a number of literary ventures over the years, such as the International Book Fair of Radical Black and Third World Books (1982–95, organised by Bogle-L'Ouverture Publications, New Beacon Books and Race Today), and has worked with a wide variety of spoken-word artists and poets, including John Agard, Sandra Agard, Kwame Dawes, Patience Agbabi, Inua Ellams, John Lyons and Jean Binta Breeze.

Waithe's most recent CD, Gathering Echoes, was released to critical acclaim, with the reviewer for Caribbean Life (New York) referring to it as "a significant milestone.... With this CD, Waithe, a phenomenal flautist, has proven that he has gotten better with age, appealing to a new generation of music lovers."

== Awards and honours ==
Honours that Waithe has been accorded include in 2003 the Wordsworth McAndrew Award, presented by the Guyana Folk Festival (New York) to celebrate Guyanese who have made important contributions to the country's cultural life, and in 2010 a WOM@TT Best of British Award.

He was invited by the government of Guyana to perform at the country's golden jubilee celebrations in May 2016.

On 9 November 2023, at the 57th Convocation ceremony of the University of Guyana, he was awarded an honorary doctorate in recognition of excellence in the arts.

== Discography ==
CDs

- The Very Best of Keith Waithe (Essequibo Music, 2015)
- Earth Flight The Direction (Essequibo Music, 2014)
- Gathering Echoes (Essequibo Music, 2010)
- Diverse Canopy (2005)
- With various artists:Music Orchids For You — Is We Ting (A Compilation Of Guyanese Music; Guyana Cultural Association NY, 2003)
- Mellifluous: Blossoming Into Truth (2003)
- Magic of Olmec (Keda Records)
- Last of the Medicine Men (2000, BBC Music)
- Live in Concert: Rhythms of Freedom (Essequibo Music, 2000)

DVD

- Now is the Time — Keith Waithe & the Macusi Players

LP

- With various artists: Come From That Window Child — An Anthology Of Poetry & Music (Friends of Bogle, 1986)
