= Walter Roth Museum of Anthropology =

Museum in Guyana

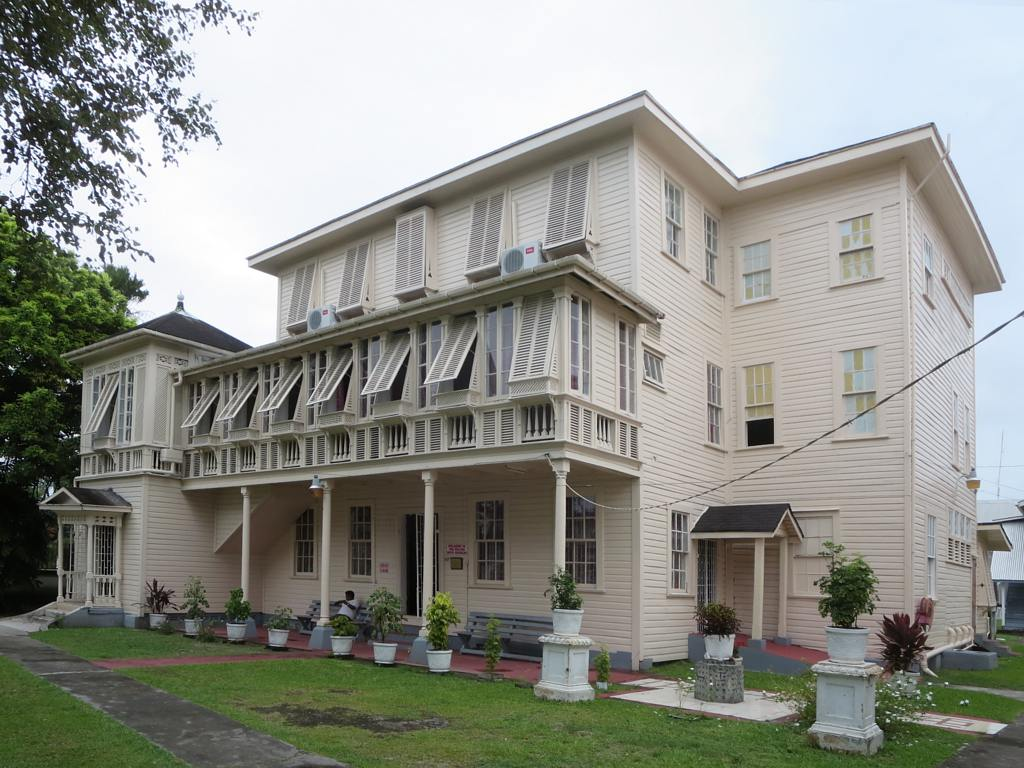

- Location within Guyana
- Established: 1974
- Location: 61 Main Street, North Cummingsburg, Georgetown, Guyana
- Coordinates: 6.81681°N 58.16453°W

The Walter Roth Museum of Anthropology is a museum of anthropology in Georgetown, Guyana and claims to be the oldest such museum in the English-speaking Caribbean region. It was established in 1974, but not opened to the public until 1982. It is located at 61 Main Street, North Cummingsburg, Georgetown.

== Objectives ==
The museum is a non-profit institution created by the Government of Guyana to collect, exhibit and conserve artifacts relating to the ancient cultures of Guyana, to conduct anthropological research and disseminate knowledge of the Indigenous Peoples of Guyana through its in-house and out-reach programmes.

In particular, pursuing the aims and objectives relating to its mission and function as a museum of anthropology involves:

1. promoting and make the museum accessible to students, researchers, and the general public through the rendering of professional assistance and service to them;
2. marketing the museum as an institution for the acquisition of, insight into and understanding of the various cultures of the Indigenous peoples of Guyana;
3. encouraging continuing research on different aspects of the collection by students and academics;
4. providing appropriate storage facilities for the collection store and preserve the collection under optimum conditions in line with its mission as a depository of artifacts of anthropological and archaeological significance;
5. expanding the collection in keeping with the mission of the museum.

== Collections ==
The museum was founded with the collections of Guyanese archaeologist Dr. Denis Williams. In 1980 the ethnographic collections of Dr. Walter Roth, Mr J.J. Quelch and Sir Everard im Thurn were transferred to the Walter Roth Museum from the Guyana Museum. An ethnographic collection of the Waiwai was presented to the museum in 1991 by Guyanese Cultural anthropologist Dr George P. Mentore. The museum's collections also include excavated artifacts from all of the ten Administrative Regions of Guyana.

== Publications ==
Archaeology and Anthropology, the museum's journal is published annually and subscribers include leading universities and libraries of the United States, the United Kingdom, South Africa and the Caribbean. Other publications include monographs by renowned scholars in the sub-disciplines of anthropology and children's books on prehistoric Guyana.

The museum's out-reach programme caters for the nursery, primary and secondary levels of formal education while the library is equipped to supply information for all levels of research.

== Scientific advisory committee ==
A scientific advisory committee monitors and advises the Walter Roth Museum of Anthropology on the research programmes generally, but particularly with respect to the coordination of national programmes with ongoing investigations in anthropology in South America and the Caribbean. The committee also monitors the museum's journal the objective of maintaining and/or improving its scientific standard. The committee advises in the matter of professional appointments to the museum in the fields of anthropology and museology and in museum management, training, and policies relating to museum collections.

== Possible relocation ==
The possibility of rehousing the collections has been discussed.
