= Eddie Hooper =

Guyanese musician

Eddie Hooper was a singer, composer and musician from Fyrish, Guyana. In Guyana, he is best known for his early patriotic calypso songs, which remain classics to this day. Internationally, Hooper's later music has captured the most attention. This later music defies easy categorization; it has been defined variously as disco, soca, reggae and samba-jazz. He referred to this music as 'loopie'.

Hooper's most desired records are hard to come by and rarely sell for less than $100 USD. Of his large discography, only two songs have been reissued in contemporary times: two 12" length tracks, "Pass It On (Part 1)" and "Tomorrow's Sun" on Soundway Records.

His daughters Yonette "Mystique" Hooper and Roshell "Petra" Hooper followed him and became singers.
