= Lynette Dolphin =

Guyanese musician and educator (1916–2000)

Lynette Dolphin MBE, LRAM, GRSM, ARCM, CCH
- Born: Lynette de Weever Dolphin; 7 February 1916
- Died: 8 February 2000 (aged 84)
- Education: Government Training College for Teachers; Royal Academy of Music (LRAM, GRSM, ARCM)
- Occupations: Musician, educator and chair of Guyana Department of Culture
- Awards: Member of the Order of the British Empire (MBE), Order of Roraima of Guyana (OR); Golden Arrow of Achievement; Cacique of Honor (CCH)

Lynette Dolphin MBE, LRAM, GRSM, ARCM, CCH (7 February 1916 – 8 February 2000) worked for 60 years in the fields of music education and Guyana culture. She was a musician, an educator at Queen's College, Georgetown, Guyana, for 25 years, and a chair of the Guyana Department of Culture, later called the National History and Arts Council. She established prominent music festivals and was a co-founder of the Guyana Music Teachers' Association. Dolphin was director of the Caribbean Festival of Arts (Carifesta). She compiled six books of songs for schools.

Before Guyana's independence, she became a member of the Order of the British Empire (MBE). In 1986, she received the Order of Roraima of Guyana (OR), and Dolphin was also awarded the Golden Arrow of Achievement and the Cacique of Honor (CCH). The Lynette Dolphin Scholarship Awards were established in her honour at Queen's College. Also at Queen's College, the Lynette De Weever Dolphin Center for Excellence in the Creative Arts was named after her.

== Early life and education ==
Born on 7 February 1916, Lynette de Weever Dolphin was the daughter of Clarise de Weever Dolphin, a music teacher, and E. Linford Dolphin, a school headmaster, who was honoured in the naming of the Dolphin Government School. The second of six or nine children, she spent her first nine years in the village of De Willem near Windsor Forest on West Coast Demerara. From her parents, she learned the values of obedience, punctuality, and self-discipline.

Having received a scholarship in 1925, she attended the elite Bishop's High School in Georgetown, Guyana. In her pre-teen years she was a violinist, pianist, and accompanist to singers. She participated in concerts in Georgetown and on the West Coast. She began taking piano lessons from Eleanor Brown in the early 1930s. She continued accompanying other musicians and performing solos at concerts in Georgetown through her teens. In 1932, at the age of sixteen, she was a pupil teacher of music at the Broad Street Government School. (Note: Her father was headmaster of the school that was later renamed Dolphin Government School in his honour.)

After her mother died in 1936, Lynette and her sister lived at the household of Valerie Fraser (later Rodway), who would become a good friend. She graduated from the Government Training College for Teachers in Guyana.

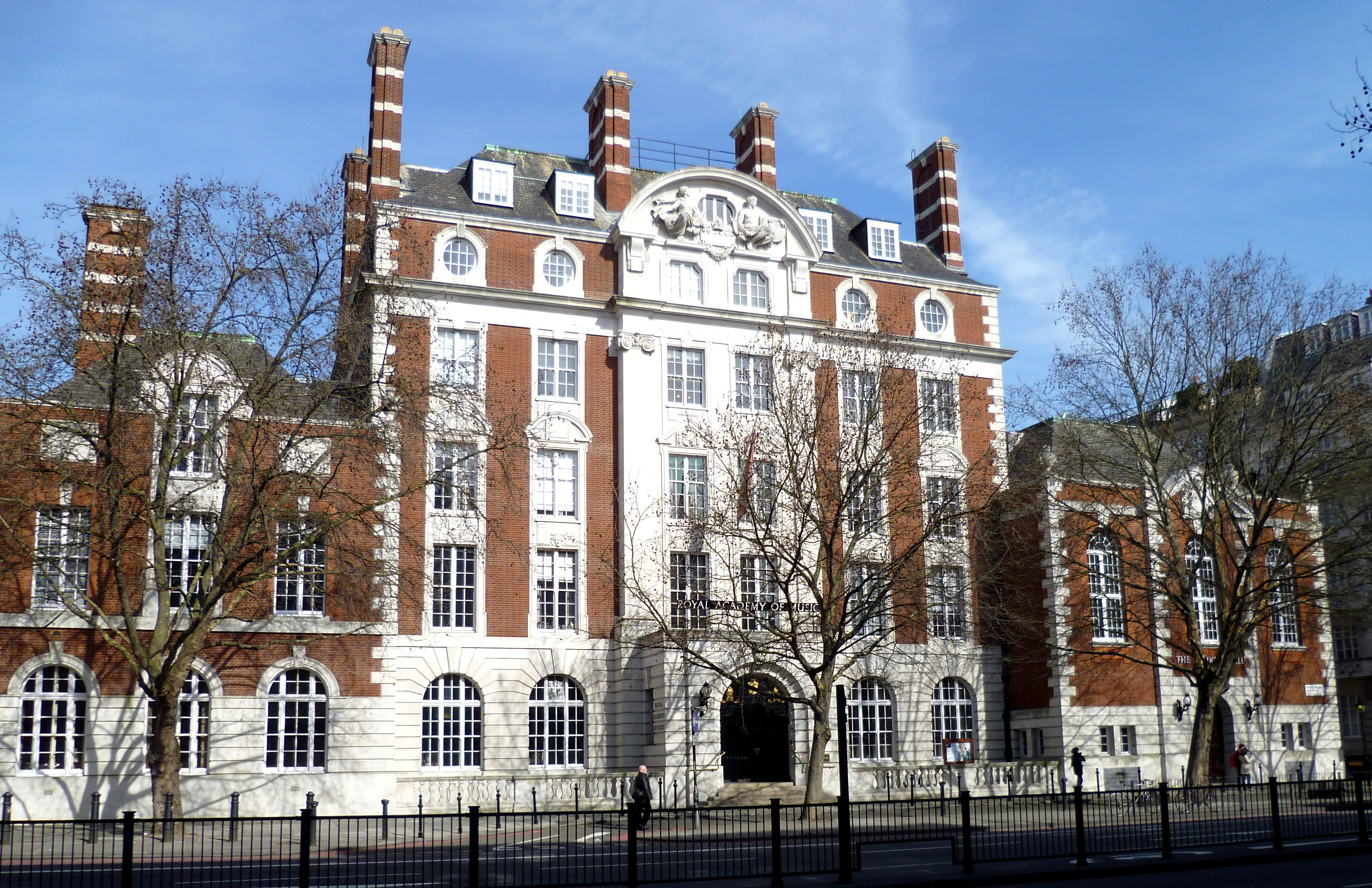
The facade of the Royal Academy of Music, London, England

In 1937, she received the Gold Medal of the Associated Board of the Royal Schools of Music (ABRSM) and a four-year scholarship to attend the Royal Academy of Music in London. She was the second person from Guyana to receive that scholarship. She began her studies in London (Note: Philip Pilgrim won the scholarship in 1935 and William "Billy" Pilgrim received it in 1938.) in September 1939, when war was declared against Germany at the beginning of World War II (1 September 1939, to 2 September 1945). She was injured at the home in which she lived during a bombing raid. She returned to Guyana in 1941 after earning a Licentiate of the Royal Academy of Music (LRAM). She returned to London in 1950 to continue her studies, after which, she received her Graduate of the Royal Schools of Music (GRSM) and Associate of the Royal College of Music (ARCM) degrees. While a minister of cultural affairs for Guyana, she studied at the Corvallis Arts Center in 1970. She was sent there by the United States Department of State.

== Career ==
After she graduated from the Government Training College for Teachers, she taught at the Beterverwagting Government School. She then St Angela's Roman Catholic School, before and after she studied in London for the first time. She taught music at the Queen's College in Guyana from 1943 to 1969, where she put on productions, including Gilbert and Sullivan operas, and led the school's choirs in competitions. When she began teaching at Queen's College, she was the only woman on the staff. She also regularly performed as a musician.

She worked for the government for 60 years, 25 of which was as the chair of the Department of Culture beginning in 1966, when Guyana won its independence from the United Kingdom. Her position required her to travel, such as to Europe and North America. The Department of Culture was reorganized and its name was changed to the National History and Arts Council, of which she was the chair by 1972. She assigned directors to various disciplines, such as Denis Williams to the Burrowes School of Art and Lavinia Williams to the National School of Dance. Other disciplines for which she was responsible include music, speech and drama, literature, cultural festivals and historical awareness. For the music department, she developed diverse programs, including folk, national, and other music of Guyana, played by string bands, steel bands, Calypsonians, and Masquerade bands. She worked part-time as the director of the National History of Arts Council until she retired from Queen's College, and worked for the council on a full-time basis. Dolphin was a patron of the Woodside Choir. The Umana Yana was built for the Non-Aligned Movement, which was a political and diplomatic organization that held its first meeting in Guyana in 1971. Dolphin prepared cultural programmes for the events.

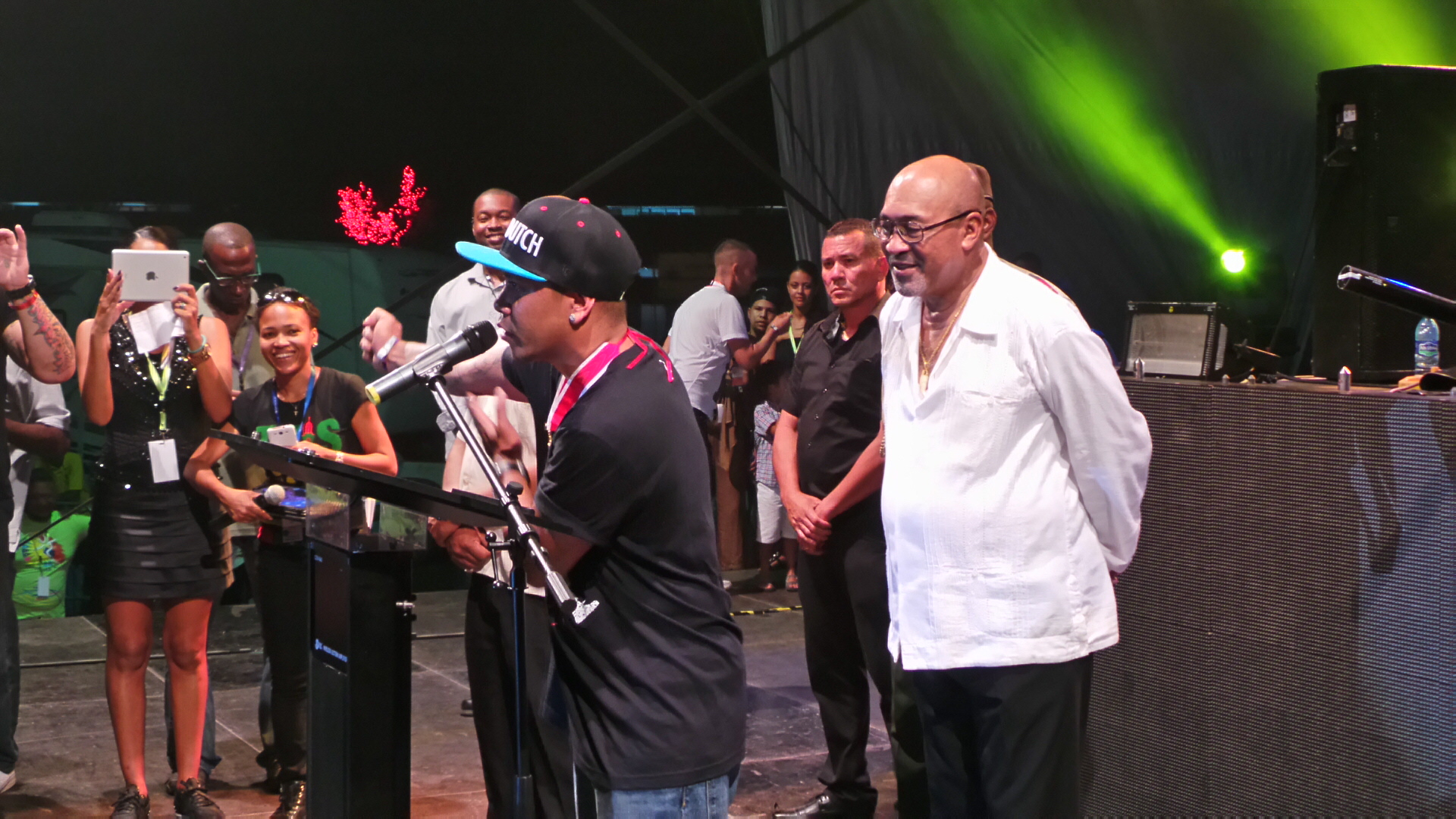
Carifesta, 2013, Opening Youth Focus, DJ Chuckie in Suriname

She established the Schools' Music Festival in 1942, when the Militia Band accompanied 1,000 school children who sang patriotic and cultural songs. Guyana Music Teachers' Association was established in 1947 or 1948 to broaden music instructor's knowledge, share leading music instruction technique, and to unite over issues affecting musical instructors. She was the organization's first secretary and, in 1998, served as president. She was a cellist and executive member of the British Guiana Philharmonic Society. She founded the British Guiana Music Festival with Eleanor Kerry in 1952. Dolphin was director of the Carifesta festival beginning in 1972 Listed under "authors and artists", she was also a participant in the event. As an outcome of the festival, the National Cultural Centre was opened in May 1976.

Dolphin compiled six school books of songs, including One Hundred Folk Songs of Guyana and Twelve Songs of Guyana in 1964. In the few days before she died in 2000, Dolphin sent the publication, Twenty Amerindian Folk Songs to the printers.

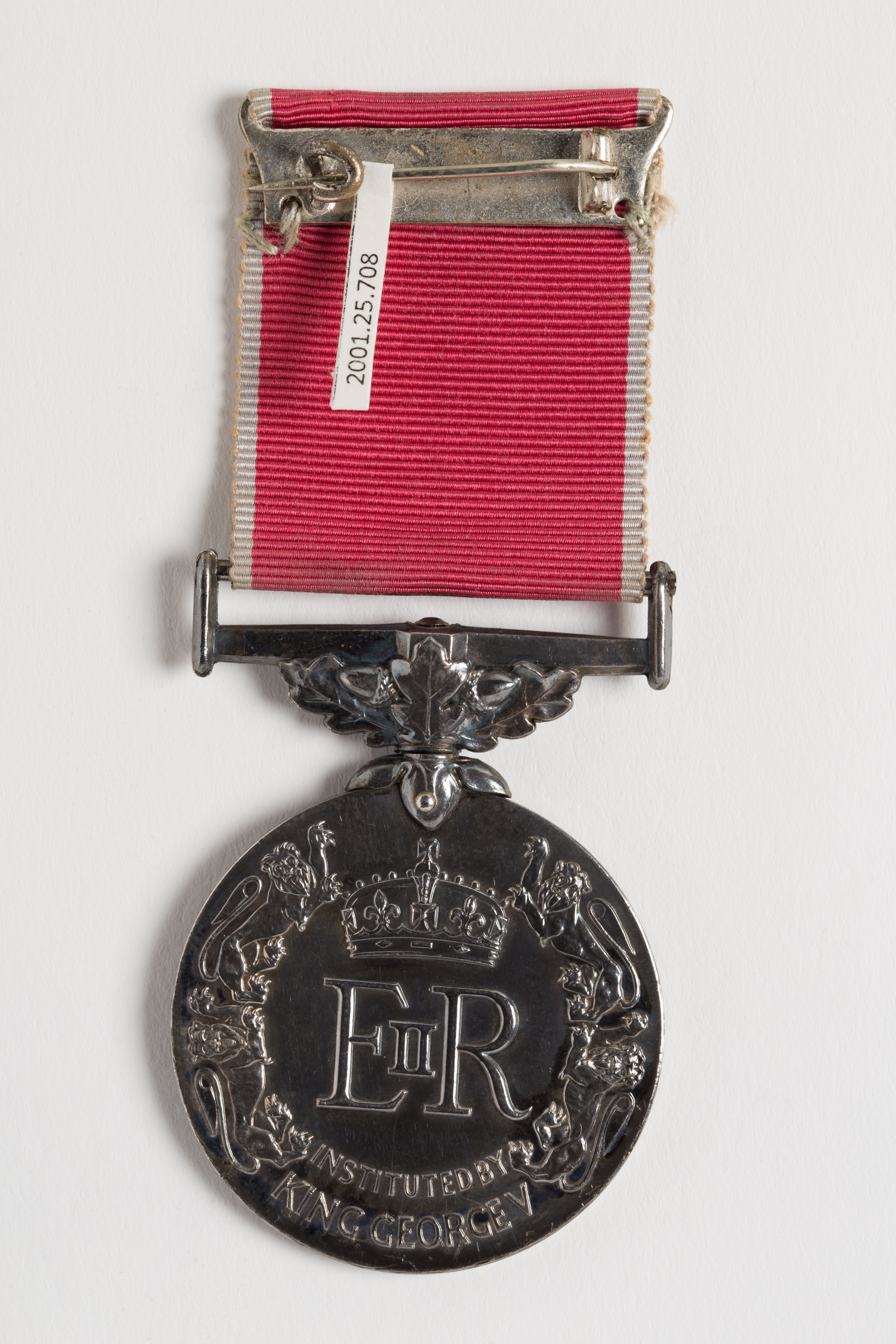
British Empire Medal

She received an Order of the British Empire (MBE) in 1959 for "services to music in British Guiana". Dolphin was presented with the medal on May 8, 1859, and was told:

Your service as a teacher has been most satisfactory, but it is in the field of music that your contribution to the country has been outstanding. Since 1952 you have been largely responsible for the Biennial Music Festivals in Georgetown. You are joint Honorary Secretary of the Music Festival Committee and the success of the Festivals is in a large measure due to your organization and supervision.

You have also made a name for yourself in arranging musical programmes in the Schools Broadcasts which have taught many children the joy of music and of singing together.

By Command of the Queen conveyed to me through Her Majesty's Principal Secretary of State for the Colonies, I present to you the Insignia of a Member of the Most Excellent Order of the British Empire.

— His Excellency the Governor, Sir Patrick Renison, K.C.M.G. on 8 May 1959.

She became an honorary local representative of the Associated Board of the Royal Schools of Music (ABRSM) in 1965. She received the Order of Roraima of Guyana in 1986, and was awarded at some point with the Cacique of Honor (CCH). For her efforts to the promote the arts, she was awarded the Golden Arrow of Achievement; She was among the first people to receive the Guyana national honour award. The Lynette Dolphin Memorial Scholarship Awards were established in her honour at Queen's College.

== Personal life ==
Dolphin lived in Georgetown in the 1940s. On 13 January 2000, Dolphin was told that she had terminal cancer. (Note: When she was told that she would not live much longer, she went to work on completing a number of tasks before she died. She completed a song book that she had been working on, made funeral arrangements, and prepared for her 84th birthday. She died the day after her birthday.) She died aged 84 on 8 February 2000, and her memorial service, attended by President Bharrat Jagdeo and other public figures, was held at The Cathedral of the Immaculate Conception in Brickdam, Georgetown.

== Legacy ==
According to the obituary for Lucille Emmeline Campbell, Lynette Dolphin and Campbell belonged "to a small group of local grandes dames who, in the middle of the 20th century, sought to project their values through dress, speech, work, religion and demeanour in every endeavour. As some, like her, remained spinsters and turned to teaching, they were able to devote their talents totally to social and educational pursuits where their influence spread far and wide."

The Lynette De Weever Dolphin Center for Excellence in the Creative Arts at Queen's College, Guyana was named after her.
