= Wordsworth McAndrew =

Guyanese writer (1936–2008)

- Born: 22 November 1936; Georgetown, British Guiana
- Died: 25 April 2008 (aged 71); New Jersey, United States
- Occupation(s): folklorist, radio broadcaster

Wordsworth McAndrew (22 November 1936 – 25 April 2008) was a leading Guyana folklorist, poet, radio broadcaster, and creative artist.

== Biography ==
McAndrew was born on 22 November 1936 in Georgetown, British Guiana, to Winslow Alexander McAndrew and Ivy McAndrew.

McAndrew died on 25 April 2008, at the East Orange Hospital, in New Jersey, where he had been living in self-imposed exile. In 2015, he was posthumously awarded the Golden Arrow of Achievement by President David A. Granger.

== Legacy ==
The Wordsworth McAndrew Award, founded in 2002 to celebrate Guyanese who have made important contributions to the country's cultural life, was named in his honour.

In 2015, Wordsworth's former wife, Rosie McAndrew, published a memoir which covers Wordsworth's Radio/TV training in England, his early broadcasting career in Guyana, their relationship, marriage and the birth of his second daughter. The book features letters written in his own words and some of his poetry.
