= State House, Guyana =

- Location within Guyana

General information
- Location: Georgetown, Guyana
- Coordinates: 6°49′04″N 58°09′46″W
- Construction started: 1853

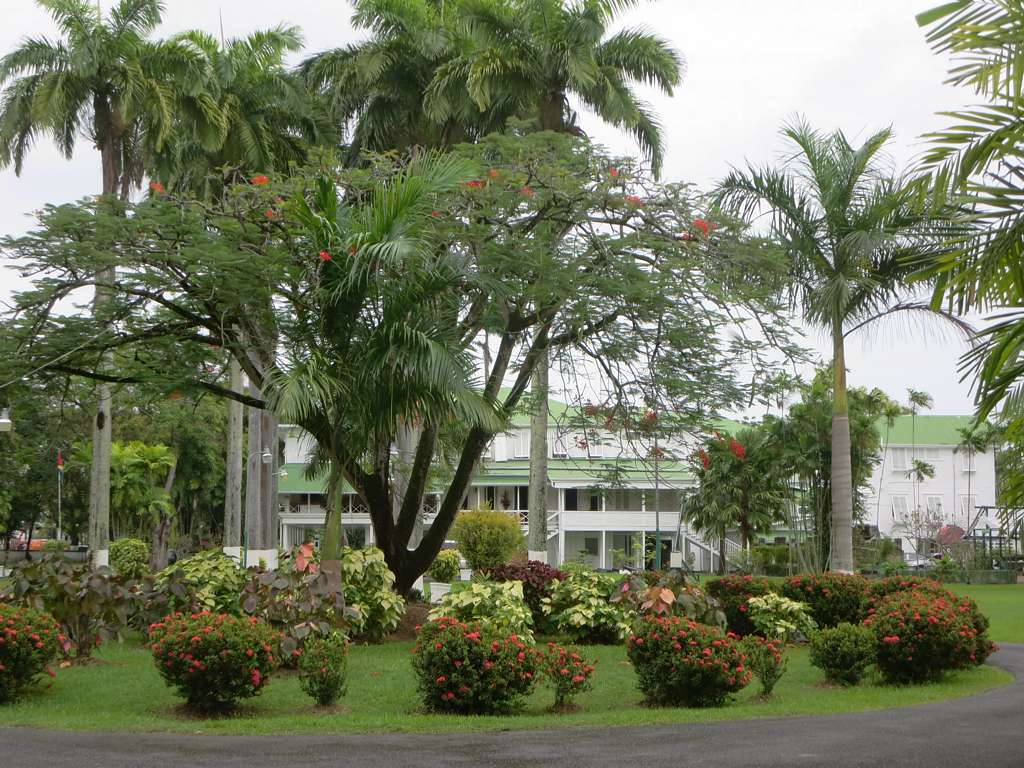
The State House in 2014

State House (formerly Government House) located in Georgetown, is the official residence of the president of Guyana. It was previously the official residence of the governor of British Guiana before the colony gained independence and became Guyana.

The original structure was built in 1823 on a small piece of land belonging to the first Anglican Bishop to British Guiana, William Piercy Austin. It was then purchased by the British government in 1853, and described as "a two-storey timber structure with a double stairway facing Carmichael Street, which stood on two-metre (eight feet)-high brick pillars". Additional improvements were made to the building in the early 20th century, and the entrance was relocated to Main Street It was the residence of the Governor General and in 1970, the country's first president, Arthur Chung, resided there. Former presidents Forbes Burnham and Hugh Desmond Hoyte resided instead in Castellani House, which now houses the Guyana National Art Gallery. In 1992, Dr. Cheddi Jagan, after being elected president, moved into State House and since then it has served as the official residence of the President of Guyana.

This building is a collection of additions, but there are a few distinctive characteristics such as the Georgian six-paned windows and the Demerara windows. To its east is Promenade Gardens (across Carmichael Street). The building has been designated as one of Guyana's 9 national monuments.

A repainting of the State House in 2015 became highly politicized as the residing president, David A. Granger, changed the color from white to green. The decision was seen as infringing on the authority of the National Trust of Guyana, which was founded in 1972 to preserve places of historical interest.

== See also ==
- Governors General of British Guiana
- Government Houses of the British Empire
