= Dennis Delgado =

American visual artist and technology critic

- Born: South Bronx, New York, U.S.
- Education: University of Rochester; City College of New York
- Website: www.delgadostudio.net

Dennis Delgado is a contemporary American artist and critic who examines how ideologies of colonialism persist and re-inscribe themselves within modern technology such as in facial recognition systems which fail to properly identify people of color. His work has been exhibited throughout the United States including the Bronx Museum of the Arts, the Schomburg Center for Research in Black Culture, UC Irvine, University of Texas at Austin, Palo Alto Art Center, El Museo del Barrio, and at the Cooper Union. He currently serves as an assistant professor in information technology at Baruch College.

== Work ==
=== The Dark Database series ===
External videos
- The Sara Little Turnbull Visiting Designer Speaker Series, Dennis Delgado, Lehman College Art Gallery via YouTube

The Dark Database series looks at the bias inherent in facial recognition systems.

== Selected group exhibitions ==
- 2021 The Black Index (online only due to COVID-19 restrictions), University of California, Irvine (CAC Gallery), Irvine, California (January 14-March 20, 2021) with Alicia Henry, Kenyatta A.C. Hinkle, Titus Kaphar, Whitfield Lovell, and Lava Thomas.
- 2022 Painting As Is II, Nathalie Karg Gallery, New York, New York (June 28-August 26, 2022) with various artists including Robert Bordo, Martha Diamond, Rochelle Feinstein, James Hyde, Caroline Kent, Elizabeth McIntosh, Oren Pinhassi, Nathlie Provosty, Craig Taylor, and Dan Walsh
- 2024 Spiritual Machines, Flux Factory Inc., Queens, New York (August 17-September 22, 2024) with various visual and performing artists including Ursula Endlicher.
