= Whitfield Lovell =

African-American artist

- Born: October 2, 1959 (age 67); Bronx, New York, U.S.
- Education: The High School of Music and Art; Manhattanville College; Maryland Institute College of Art; Parsons School of Design
- Alma mater: Cooper Union; New York University

Whitfield Lovell (born October 2, 1959) is a contemporary African-American artist who is known primarily for his drawings of African-American individuals from the first half of the 20th century. Lovell creates these drawings in pencil, oil stick, or charcoal on paper, wood, or directly on walls. In his most recent work, these drawings are paired with found objects that Lovell collects at flea markets and antique shops.

== Early career ==
Born October 2, 1959 in the Bronx, New York to the former Gladys Glover, an elementary school teacher from South Carolina, and Whitfield McAllister "Allister" Lovell, a postal clerk and photographer of Barbadian descent. Whitfield Lovell grew up in the Bronx and attended The High School of Music and Art in Manhattan. During high school, he also participated in a variety of extracurricular art programs: the Metropolitan Museum of Art High School Program, the Whitney Museum Art Resources Center, the New York State Summer School for the Arts in Fredonia, New York, and the Cooper Union Saturday Program.

In 1977, Lovell traveled to Spain to study painting and sculpture with Manhattanville College. At El Museo del Prado in Madrid, Spain, he decided that he would become a painter. Lovell has said:

"I knew I would go into some form of art, but I wasn't sure which. I was interested in fashion and advertising as options. But while I was standing in front of a Velasquez painting I had an amazing spiritual experience. The painter had communicated with me through centuries and cultures, and I suddenly understood the role of the artist. I ran from room to room. Goya, El Greco, Reubens, and Picasso all began to speak out to me. Whatever they were doing in those rooms was what I wanted to do with my life."

Lovell spent a year at Maryland Institute College of Art (MICA), Baltimore in 1977 before traveling in France, Germany, Italy, England, Austria and the Netherlands with the American Institute For Foreign Study in 1978. When he returned to New York, he enrolled in the Fine Arts Department of the Parsons School of Design and then The Cooper Union School of Art, from which he graduated in 1981. In 1982, Lovell traveled to Egypt, Nigeria, and the Republic of Benin, West Africa.

In 1985, Lovell attended the Skowhegan School of Painting and Sculpture, where he reconsidered the nature of his own work:

"In Skowhegan I had time to really think about what I wanted to do with my work. I felt the formal issues about color were fighting with the narratives I was getting at ... So I narrowed down the color, and began to work monochromatically. I had all of my father's old photographs mailed to me, and I began a process of looking through these images each day before starting to work. The work became more personal and a reflection of the way I saw myself as an artist."

This practice, using old photographs as inspiration and source material, has stayed with Whitfield to this day.

In 1986, Lovell stayed with relatives in Barbados, West Indies. In 1989, he attended New York University (NYU) Graduate Program in Venice, Italy. In 1990, he traveled to Mexico, where he began collecting ex-votos and retablos, which he cited as influences in his work.

"After looking at European paintings for so many years and then the great black painters Jacob Lawrence, Bob Thompson, and Horace Pippin, I looked toward other cultures for inspiration. I found myself more attracted to folk art, which wasn't as concerned with making high art, but with the joy of storytelling. My training, however, was heavily steeped in European artistic values; even the earlier pieces, which had more modernist notions in them, really did come from that tradition. So I also found artists from Latin America to be a very refreshing discovery for me. They seemed to fuse European colonial styles with a different sensibility. I felt they were more passionate about the religious and social narratives and less concerned with skill. Although I didn't grow up Catholic, I was attracted to that symbolism and to certain decorative elements that I feel are part of many images one sees growing up in a place like the Bronx. Rather than return to Venice to finish my master's degree, I spent a lot of time in Mexico getting an education of a different sort."

In 1994, Lovell's work was shown as part of the American contingent at the IV Bienal Internacional de Pintura en Cuenca, Ecuador. Other American artists exhibiting at this show were Donald Locke, Philemona Williamson, Freddy Rodríguez and Emilio Cruz.

== Installations ==
In 1993, Lovell visited a private artist's retreat at the Villa Val Lemme in Capriatta d'Orba, Italy. The villa had been built by a slave trader in the early 20th century.

"There were grotesque paintings of Africans with nose rings lining the ceilings of some of the rooms. Also, the coat of arms on the front of the building had an African face on it, and a few very elderly locals could apparently remember the blacks who had lived there. The slaver had obviously continued to trade long after it had become illegal, but that was not unheard of in some other countries. It was hard to ignore the background of the place. Ordinarily the experience of being somewhere new would have fermented over time and then become a piece much later. That's how I was used to working. But in this case, I later realized, it was only by leaving my marks in the house itself, giving a voice to those African slaves, that I could truly express what it meant for me--an African American--to be there in the seemingly luxurious environs of an Italian villa."

Whitfield Lovell, 2 8 M, 2008

In response, Lovell created site-specific drawings on the walls of the villa using its history as the theme, a dignified image of a black person. This was Lovell's first installation piece.

In 1995, while an artist in residence at Rice University in Houston, Texas, Lovell created his second installation. The piece, entitled Echo, was at Project Row Houses, a venue comprising abandoned "shot gun" houses in which artists create installations. Of the project, Lovell has said: "Villa Val Lemme was the first time I worked directly on the wall. At the time I wanted to explore installation further but wanted the right circumstances to arise. When I was approached to do a row house it was just the right time. The feeling in the house was ideal for trying new ideas related to my interest in old photographs of "anonymous" people".

Whispers From the Walls was Lovell's fourth installation, created during a 1999 residency at the University of North Texas Art Gallery in Denton. Lovell created a rectangular house of salvaged boards with multicolored peeling paint. He covered the floors with soil and old clothing through which gallery visitors walked. Inside the house was a single room filled with furniture, clothing, personal objects, and sound. On the interior walls, life-size charcoal drawings suggested human residents. This exhibition appeared the Seattle Art Museum and the Studio Museum in Harlem on tour.

Portrayals, which originated at the Neuberger Museum in Purchase, NY, in the spring of 2000, included nineteen tableaux.

Visitation: The Richmond Project focused on Richmond, Virginia's historically African-American district Jackson Ward, "the nation's first major black entrepreneurial community." It traveled to the University of Wyoming, Laramie; the Columbus Museum Uptown, Georgia; and the Museum of Contemporary Art in Sydney, Australia, in 2004.

SANCTUARY: The Great Dismal Swamp originated at the Contemporary Art Center of Virginia. It was inspired by accounts of runaway slaves who hid in or escaped through the 2,200-square mile Great Dismal Swamp. Of the project, Lovell has said:

"The main inspiration for Sanctuary: The Great Dismal Swamp, aside from the readings and research I did, was visiting the swamp itself. The people at the Dismal Swamp Wildlife Refuge hosted me for a day of hikes and a boat ride across Lake Drummond, which is in the center of the swamp. Lake Drummond is an egg-shaped pond about three miles across and no deeper than six feet at its center. It was referred to by Irish poet John O'Reilly as 'the most wonderful and beautiful sheet of water on the continent.' The water is a rich brown color, like tea, the result of the tannin that dripped from the juniper trees over the centuries. That was the inspiration for the pool of water that became the centerpiece for the installation.

"Most important for me were the moments when I stood silently in the swamp and just listened to the sounds and felt the ambience."

"For the installation we got thirty trees and stood them up in the gallery, with branches, leaves, and vines extending into the space, creating barriers and obstacles for the viewer. The floor was covered with mulch, and there were sounds of crickets, cicadas, and barking hounds throughout. Twelve basins and washboards filled with water were placed around the room, with the faces of people looking out at the viewer. Many of the images and objects that implied human inhabitants and the shingle industry were submerged in water. Somehow the legacy of those who lived hidden in the swamp to avoid slavery seemed to have been nearly lost, buried under that lake."

== Tableaux ==
In 1997, during a month in Mount Desert, Maine, at the Acadia Summer Art Program, Lovell made his first tableaux: charcoal drawings on antique wood panels coupled with found objects.

== Kin Series ==
The Kin Series (2008 - 2011) is collection of sixty works made of individual portrait images in Conte crayon on paper combined with found objects. The objects sometimes overlap with the image and cast shadows. The drawing and object are then framed in glass and black metal.

The series began with a drawing based on a photo-booth photograph of a young boy. Lovell says: "There was something about that young boy's face that captivated me. His eyes and mouth were so expressive, as if he were about to cry. I felt compelled to try and capture that emotional quality."

For this series, Lovell's photographic sources differ from his vintage studio shots. Instead, he uses mug shots, passport photos, and photobooth images. Lovell has described the difference in using these photographs as sources: "Once the Kin Series got going, I noticed a major difference in the drawings. The difference was the people were more harshly lit, not made up, and the photos were untouched and there was often a reluctance in their expressions. I saw those qualities as more honest and raw (if I may), whereas in the studio portrait photos that I have worked from, the sitters appear very elegant and posed. Those people were very invested in how they presented themselves. They chose the day, the clothes, the photographer, etc."

== Collecting ==
Lovell's Tableaux and Kin Series include an abundance of antique objects that are symptomatic of Lovell's love of collecting. Lovell has said: "I began collecting hands after I had already been using hands in my work. The more I learned about the iconography of hands, the more excited I was to continue with the theme. Also, my interest in collecting crayon portraits came simultaneously with the images in the Hand Series, thought I didn't consciously think about it at the time ... There has always been a reason for my wanting to own certain objects more than others. I've tried to be a focused collector, so that I was spending my money on things that fed the work."

== Passages ==
In February 2023, Whitfield Lovell: Passages, the most comprehensive exhibition of Lovell's work to date, had its world premiere at the Boca Raton Museum of Art in Boca Raton, Florida. The exhibition is a retrospective of Lovell's significant body of work which includes the installations Visitations: The Richmond Project and Deep River, which are being presented concurrently for the first time. Also included, are a selection of work from the Kin series, and Card Pieces (2019-2020), the latter one of his most recent creations.

External videos
- Whitfield Lovell discusses his familial inspirations and artistic development as part of the Passages exhibition at VMFA., Virginia Museum of Fine Arts (VMFA) via YouTube

That summer the touring exhibit travelled to the Virginia Museum of Fine Arts, followed by stops at the Arkansas Museum of Fine Arts, the Cincinnati Art Museum, and the Mint Museum Uptown. The exhibit made its final stop at the McNay Art Museum in San Antonio, Texas beginning October 23, 2024 (originally scheduled October 26, 2024). Included in this stop were The Reds (2021-2022), Lovell's newest series, featuring works on deep crimson paper. The latter includes two operational telephones, where museum guests listened to a stirring rendition of the hymn Lift Every Voice and Sing by lifting the receiver. The exhibition concluded at the McNay on February 19, 2025.

== Awards ==
- 1982 Jerome Foundation Fellowship to the Robert Blackburn Printmaking Workshop
- 1985 Eastman Scholarship to the Skowhegan School of Painting and Sculpture
- 1986 Robert Blackburn Printmaking Workshop Fellowship
- 1986 New York State Council on the Arts Grant
- 1987 New York State Council on the Arts Grant
- 1988 Mousem D'Asilah Residency, Asilah, Morocco
- 1990 Promise of Learnings Inc. Award for Excellence in Education
- 1990 Metropolitan Transportation Authority, Arts for Transit Poster Commission
- 1990 Penny McCall Foundation Grant
- 1990 Artists Homeless Shelter Collaborative Grant
- 2001 Art Awareness Residency, Lexington, NY
- 2002 Virginia Museum of Contemporary Art, Virginia Beach, VA, Artist in Residence
- 2003 Richard C. Diebenkorn Fellowship, San Francisco Art Institute, California
- 2007 Emil & Dines Carlsen Award, National Academy Museum
- 2007 MacArthur Fellows Program, Chicago, Illinois
- 2009 Malvina Hoffman Artists Fund Prize, 184th Annual Exhibition of Contemporary American Art, National Academy Museum, New York, New York
- 2009 Nancy Graves Grant for Visual Artists, The Nancy Graves Foundation, New York, New York
- 2014 National Academy Award for Excellence, New York, New York

== Collections ==
Lovell's work is held in the following permanent collections, among others:

- Baltimore Museum of Art, Baltimore, Maryland
- Brooklyn Museum Brooklyn, New York
- Columbus Museum of Art, Columbus, Ohio
- Corcoran Gallery of Art, Washington, DC
- Cornell Fine Arts Museum, Winter Park, Florida
- Cummer Museum, Jacksonville, Florida
- High Museum of Art, Atlanta, Georgia
- Metropolitan Museum of Art, New York City, New York
- Museum of Modern Art (MoMA), New York City, New York
- National Gallery of Art, Washington, D.C.
- National Museum of African American History and Culture, Smithsonian, Washington, D.C.
- Neuberger Museum of Art, Purchase, New York
- New Orleans Museum of Art, New Orleans, Louisiana
- Pennsylvania Academy of the Fine Arts, Philadelphia, Pennsylvania
- The Phillips Collection, Washington, D.C.
- Seattle Art Museum, Seattle, Washington
- Smithsonian American Art Museum, Washington, D.C.
- Studio Museum in Harlem, New York, New York
- Whitney Museum of American Art, New York, New York
- Williams College Museum of Art, Williamstown, Massachusetts
- Yale University Art Gallery, New Haven, Connecticut

== Solo exhibitions ==
- 1982 Interchurch Center, New York, New York
- 1984 Galeria Morivivi, New York, New York
- 1985 John Jay College, New York, New York
- 1987 Harlem School of the Arts, New York, New York
- 1988 Jersey City Museum, Jersey City, NJ
- 1993 Lehman College Art Gallery, New York, New York
- 1997 Southeastern Center for Contemporary Art, Winston-Salem, NC
- 1997 DC Moore Gallery, New York, New York
- 1998 Collecting Inspiration, The Andy Warhol Museum, Pittsburgh, PA
- 1999-2005 Whispers From the Walls - An Installation by Whitfield Lovell, University of North Texas Art Gallery, Denton, TX (traveled to: Texas Fine Art Association, The Jones Center for Contemporary Art, Austin, TX; Seattle Art Museum, Seattle, WA; The Studio Museum in Harlem, New York, NY; Robeson Art Gallery, Rutgers, State University of New Jersey, Newark, NJ; Virginia Museum of Contemporary Art, Virginia Beach, VA; Texarkana Regional Arts & Humanities Council, Texarkana, TX; Montgomery Museum of Fine Arts, Montgomery, AL; Public Library of Charlotte & Mecklenburg County, Charlotte, NC; California African American Museum, Los Angeles, CA; Reed College, Portland, OR; National Civil Rights Museum, Memphis, TN; San Antonio Museum of Art, TX; Louisiana State University, Union Art Gallery, LA; Stedman Art Gallery, Rutgers-Camden, NJ; Arkansas Arts Center, Little Rock, AR; Dane G. Hansen Memorial Museum, Logan, KS)
- 2000 Recent Tableaux, DC Moore Gallery, New York, New York
- 2000–02 Portrayals, Neuberger Museum of Art, State University of New York, Purchase, NY (traveled to: Montclair Art Museum, Montclair, NJ; Tubman African-American Museum, Macon, GA; Evansville Museum of Art, Evansville, IN)
- 2001 Beyond the Frame: Whitfield Lovell, Knoxville Museum of Art, Knoxville, TN
- 2001 Embers, Boston University Art Gallery, Boston, MA
- 2001 Whitfield Lovell, Recent Tableaux, Black History Museum & Cultural Center of Virginia, Richmond, VA
- 2001–04 Visitation: The Richmond Project, Hand Workshop Art Center, Richmond, VA (traveled to: University of Wyoming Art Museum, Laramie, WY; The Columbus Museum, Columbus, GA; Museum of Contemporary Art, Sydney, Australia)
- 2002 SANCTUARY: The Great Dismal Swamp, An Installation by Whitfield Lovell, Virginia Museum of Contemporary Art, Virginia Beach, VA
- 2002 Whitfield Lovell: Memories, Thomasville Cultural Center, Thomasville, GA (traveled to: Albany Museum of Art, Albany, GA)
- 2002 Whitfield Lovell: Embers, DC Moore Gallery, New York, New York
- 2003 Whitfield Lovell: Tableaux, Art Museum of Southeast Texas, Beaumont, TX
- 2003 GRACE: A Project by Whitfield Lovell, Bronx Museum of the Arts, Bronx, New York
- 2003 Whitfield Lovell: Ancestors, Flint Institute of Arts, MI
- 2003 That You Know Who We Are: Works by Whitfield Lovell, Zora Neale Hurston National Museum of Fine Arts, Eatonville, FL
- 2004 Whitfield Lovell, Arthur Roger Gallery, New Orleans, LA
- 2004 Whitfield Lovell: Tableaux, Olin Art Gallery, Kenyon College, Gambier, OH
- 2005 Whitfield Lovell: Homegoing, John Michael Kohler Arts Center, Sheboygan, WI
- 2006 Whitfield Lovell, DC Moore Gallery, New York, New York
- 2008 Whitfield Lovell: All Things in Time, Hudson River Museum, Yonkers, New York
- 2008 Whitfield Lovell: Kith & Kin, DC Moore Gallery, New York, New York
- 2009 Whitfield Lovell: Distant Relations, Berrie Center for Performing and Visual Arts, Ramapo College of New Jersey, Mahwah, NJ
- 2009 Mercy, Patience and Destiny: The Women of Whitfield Lovell's Tableaux, Atlanta College of Art Gallery of Savannah College of Art and Design, Woodruff Arts Center, Atlanta, GA
- 2009 Whitfield Lovell: One Man's Treasures, Hampton University Museum, Hampton, VA
- 2010 Whitfield Lovell, Arthur Roger Gallery, New Orleans, LA
- 2011 More Than You Know: Works By Whitfield Lovell, Smith College Museum of Art, Northampton, MA
- 2013 Whitfield Lovell: Deep River, Hunter Museum of American Art, Chattanooga, TN
- 2015 Whitfield Lovell: Deep River, Telfair Museums, Savannah, GA
- 2015 Whitfield Lovell: Deep River, The Cummer Museum of Art & Gardens, Jacksonville, FL
- 2016 Whitfield Lovell: The Kin Series and Related Works", The Phillips Collection, Washington, DC
- 2017 Inbox: Whitfield Lovell, The Museum of Modern Art, New York, NY (March 25–May 26, 2017)
- 2017 Whitfield Lovell: What's Past is Prologue, Early Works 1987-1998, DC Moore Gallery, New York, NY
- 2021 Whitfield Lovell: Le Rouge et Le Noir, DC Moore Gallery, New York, New York
- 2022 Whitfield Lovell: Marks in Time, Arthur Roger Gallery, New Orleans, LA
- 2023-2025 Whitfield Lovell: Passages, Boca Raton Museum of Art, Boca Raton, Florida (February 15-May 21, 2023), Virginia Museum of Fine Arts, Arlington, Virginia (June 17-September 10, 2023), Arkansas Museum of Fine Arts, Little Rock, Arkansas (October 27, 2023 – January 14, 2024), Cincinnati Art Museum, Cincinnati, Ohio (March 1-May 26, 2024), Mint Museum of Modern Art (Uptown), Charlotte, North Carolina (June 29-September 22, 2024), and McNay Art Museum, San Antonio, Texas (October 23, 2024 – February 19, 2025)

== Selected group exhibitions ==
- 1999 African American Art: Recent Aquisitions, National Museum of American Art, Smithsonian Institution, Washington, DC
- 2003 Art a Century Apart: 1903 and 2003, Mississippi Museum of Art, Jackson, MS
- 2008 Provocative Visions: Race and Identity--Selections from the Permanent Collection, Metropolitan Museum of Art, New York, New York
- 2011 Cake Walk Unveiled: Contemporary Artists Respond to the Past, The McNay Art Museum, San Antonio, Texas
- 2016-17 The Color Line, Musée du Quai Branly – Jacques Chirac, Paris, France
- 2021 The Black Index (online only due to COVID-19 restrictions), University of California, Irvine (CAC Gallery), Irvine, California (January 14-March 20, 2021) with Dennis Delgado, Alicia Henry, Kenyatta A.C. Hinkle, Titus Kaphar, and Lava Thomas.
- 2024 Drawing, David Klein Gallery, Detroit, Michigan (February 3-March 16, 2024) featuring 21 artists including:Susan Goethel Campbell, Kim McCarty, Joel Daniel Phillips, Benjamin Pritchard, and Kelly Reemtsen.
- 2025 Interlayered, DC Moore Gallery, New York City (May 8-August 6, 2025) featuring Valerie Jaudon, Joyce Kozloff, and Chie Fueki

== Bibliography ==
- "Whitfield Lovell", Tom Otterness, BOMB, 91/Spring 2005
- Bartholomew F. Bland, Whitfield Lovell, Whitfield Lovell: all things in time, Hudson River Museum, 2008, ISBN 9780943651385
- Lucy R. Lippard, Carla Hanzal, Leslie King-Hammond, and Jennifer Ellen Way. The Art of Whitfield Lovell: Whispers from the Walls, Pomegranate, 2003, ISBN 978-0-7649-2447-7

== Books and exhibition catalogues ==
- 1983 Rosner-Jeria, Elaine, and William Jung. Trans-Fers (exhibition catalogue). New York: Henry Street Settlement and El Grupo Morivivi, 1983.
- 1983 Bickimer, David A. Christ the Placenta, Notes to My Mentor on Religious Education. Birmingham: Religious Education Press, 1983.
- 1984 Artist in the Marketplace (exhibition catalogue). Bronx, NY: The Bronx Museum of the Arts, 1984.
- 1986 Verre, Philip. Curator's Choice II (exhibition catalogue). Bronx, NY: Bronx Museum of the Arts, 1986.
- 1986 Black Visions '86 (exhibition catalogue). New York: Tweed Gallery, 1986.
- 1987 Bibby, Diedre. Who's Uptown: Harlem '87 (exhibition catalogue). New York: Schomburg Center for Research in Black Culture, 1987.
- 1988 Other Countries: Gay Black Voices, New York, NY: Cultural Council Foundation/Management and Resources for the Arts, 1988.
- 1988 Jones, Kellie. New Visions: James Little, Whitfield Lovell, Alison Saar (exhibition catalogue). Queens, NY: The Queens Museum, 1988.
- 1989 Smith, Valerie. Selections from the Artists File, Artists Space (exhibition catalogue). New York: Artists Space, 1989.
- 1990 Stanislaus, Grace. New Perspectives: Colin Chase and Whitfield Lovell (exhibition catalogue). Miami: Miami Dade College, Wolfson Gallery, 1990.
- 1990 Georgia, Olivia. Family Stories (exhibition catalogue). Staten Island, NY: Snug Harbor Cultural Center, 1990.
- 1991 Long, Richard, and Judith Wilson. African-American Works on Paper from the Cochran Collection (exhibition catalogue). Atlanta: Double Density, 1991.
- 1991 Jones, Kellie, and Thomas W. Sokolowski. Interrogating Identity (exhibition catalogue). New York: Grey Art Gallery and Study Center, 1991.
- 1991 Bellamy, Peter. The Artist Project, Portraits of the Real Word/New York Artists 1981–1990. New York: IN Publishing, 1991.
- 1993 Yau, John. The Bronx Celebrates Whitfield Lovell (exhibition catalogue). Bronx, NY: Lehman College Art Gallery, 1993.
- 1993 Hazlewood, Carl. Current Identities, Recent Painting in the United States (exhibition catalogue). Newark, NJ: Aljira Center for Contemporary Art, 1993.
- 1994 Henning, Roni. Screen Printing: Water Based Techniques, Non-Toxic Methods for a Safe Environment. New York: Watson Guptill Publications, 1994.
- 1994 Balka, Sigmund R. Empowerment: The Art of African American Artists (exhibition catalogue). White Plains, NY: Krasdale Gallery, 1994.
- 1995 Yau, John. Murder (exhibition catalogue). Santa Monica: Smart Art Press, 1995.
- 1995 de Larrazabel, Eudoxia Estrella. IV Bienal International de Pintura, Cuenca, Ecuador (exhibition catalogue). Cuenca, Ecuador, 1995.
- 1996 Wolfe, Townsend. National Drawing Invitational (exhibition catalogue). Little Rock: Arkansas Arts Center, 1996.
- 1996 Chin, Mel. Scratch (exhibition catalogue). New York: Thread Waxing Space, 1996.
- 1996 Cappellazzo, Amy. Real (exhibition catalogue). Miami: Bass Museum of Art, 1996.
- 1997 Llanes, Llilian. Sexta Bienal de la Habana, El Individuo y Su Memoria (exhibition catalogue). Havana, Cuba: Centro Wifredo Lam, 1997.
- 1998 Taha, Halima M. Collecting African American Art: Works on Paper and Canvas. New York: Crown Publishers, 1998.
- 1999 Lippard, Lucy, and Jennifer Ellen Way. The Art of Whitfield Lovell, Whispers From the Walls (exhibition catalogue). Denton, TX: University of North Texas Press, 1999.
- 1999 Hertz, Betti-Sue. Urban Mythologies: The Bronx Represented Since the 1960s (exhibition catalogue). Bronx, NY: Bronx Museum of the Arts, 1999.
- 2000 Wei, Lilly. Portrayals (exhibition catalogue). Purchase, NY: The Neuberger Museum of Art, 2000.
- 2000 20 Years of Artists in the Marketplace Program (CD-ROM). Bronx, NY: The Bronx Museum of the Arts, 2000.
- 2000 Hills, Patricia. Recent Tableaux (exhibition catalogue). New York, NY: DC Moore Gallery, 2000.
- 2000 Foster, Carter E., and Stephen F. F. Jost. Drawing on Language (exhibition catalogue). Cleveland: SPACES Gallery, 2000.
- 2000 DC Moore Gallery. Whitfield Lovell: Portrayals (exhibition catalogue).
- 2001 Wolfe, Townsend. About Face: Collection of Jackye and Curtis Finch, Jr. (exhibition catalogue). Little Rock: Arkansas Arts Center, 2001: 62, illus.
- 2001 Selections: Painting (exhibition catalogue). Oakdale, NY: Dowling College, 2001.
- 2001 Makrandi, Nandini. Beyond the Frame: Whitfield Lovell (exhibition brochure). Knoxville: Knoxville Museum of Art, 2001.
- 2001 Kushner, Robert. Beauty Without Regret (exhibition catalogue). Santa Fe: Bellas Artes Gallery, 2001.
- 2001 Fairbrother, Trevor. "Going Forward, Looking Back," in Words of Wisdom: A Curator's Vade Mecum on Contemporary Art, New York: Independent Curators International, 2001: 56-58.
- 2002 Smagula, Howard J. Creative Drawing, London, England: Lawrence King Publishing, 2002: 15, 133.
- 2002 Nahas, Dominique. Whitfield Lovell: Embers (exhibition catalogue). New York: DC Moore Gallery, 2002.
- 2002 Hanzal, Carla. SANCTUARY: The Great Dismal Swamp, An Installation by Whitfield Lovell (exhibition booklet). Virginia Beach: Contemporary Art Center of Virginia, 2002.
- 2003 Lippard, Lucy R., Carla Hanzal, Leslie King-Hammond, and Jennifer Ellen Way. The Art of Whitfield Lovell: Whispers from the Walls, 2nd edn, San Francisco: Pomegranate, 2003.
- 2003 Lapcek, Barbara. "Whitfield Lovell: Visual Artist," in Hatch-Billops Collections, Inc.: Artist & Influence, Vol. XXI, New York: Hatch-Billops Collection, 2003: 175-192.
- 2003 Gerdts, William H. et al. American Art at the Flint Institute of Arts, Flint, MI: Flint Institute of Arts, 2003: 260-261.
- 2003 Everett, Gwen. African American Masters: Highlights from the Smithsonian American Art Museum. New York: Harry N. Abrams; Washington, DC: Smithsonian American Art Museum, 2003.
- 2003 Bessire, Mark H. C. Skowhegan 2002-2003 Faculty Exhibition (exhibition catalogue). Portland, ME: Institute of Contemporary Art, Maine College of Art, 2003.
- 2004 Princenthal, Nancy et al. Whitfield Lovell, in +Witness (exhibition catalogue). Sydney: Museum of Contemporary Art, 2004: 42-49.
- 2004 Brookman, Philip. Common Ground: Discovering Community in 150 Years of Art (exhibition catalogue). London: Merrell Publishers, 2004.
- 2005 Yee, Lydia. Collection Remixed (exhibition catalogue). Bronx, NY: The Bronx Museum of the Arts, 2005: 54-55.
- 2007 182nd Annual Exhibition of Contemporary American Art (exhibition catalogue). New York: National Academy Museum, 2007: illus. 133.
- 2007 Reynolds, Jock. Art For Yale: Collecting for a New Century (exhibition catalogue). New Haven, CT: Yale University Art Gallery, 2007: illus. 334.
- 2008 Conrad, Dr. Derek Conrad. The Other Mainstream II: Selections from the Collection of Mikki and Stanley Weithorn (exhibition catalogue). Tempe, AZ: Arizona State University Art Museum, 2008: illus. 31.
- 2008 Heartney, Eleanor. Art and Today, New York: Phaidon Press, 2008: illus. 412.
- 2008 Sims, Lowery Stokes. Whitfield Lovell: All Things in Time, Yonkers, NY: Hudson River Museum, 2008.
- 2009 Lewis, Sarah. Mercy, Patience and Destiny: The Women of Whitfield Lovell's Tableaux (exhibition catalogue). Atlanta: The ACA Gallery of SCAD, 2009.
- 2009 Kim, Linda. "Distant Relations: Identity and Estrangement in Whitfield Lovell's Kin Series," in Distant Relations (exhibition catalogue). Mahwah, NJ: Ramapo College, 2009.
- 2009 Carson, Charles D. and Julie L. McGee. Sound:Print:Record: African American Legacies (exhibition catalogue). Newark, DE: University Museums, University of Delaware, 2009: illus. cover, 46.
- 2010 United States Mission to the United Nations, New York: ART in Embassies Exhibition (exhibition catalog), Washington, DC: Art in Embassies, 2010.
- 2010 Franks, Pamela and Robert E. Steele. Embodied: Black Identities in American Art from the Yale University Art Gallery (exhibition catalog). New Haven, CT: Yale University Art Gallery, 2010: illus. 45.
- 2010 Griffin, Farah Jasmine. "Whitfield Lovell", in RE: COLLECTION, Selected Works from The Studio Museum in Harlem, New York: The Studio Museum in Harlem, 2010.
- 2023 Lovell, Whitfield. edited by Michèle Wije; essays by Cheryl Finley, Bridget R. Cooks. Whitfield Lovell:passages (exhibition catalogue), New York, NY : Rizzoli Electa, a division of Rizzoli International Publications, Incorporated : American Federation of Arts
