= Donald Locke =

Guyanese artist

- Born: Donald Cuthbert Locke; 17 September 1930; Stewartville, Demerara County, Guyana
- Died: 6 December 2010 (aged 80); Atlanta, Georgia, United States
- Education: Edinburgh College of Art
- Occupation: Artist
- Known for: Wood sculptures

Donald Cuthbert Locke (17 September 1930 – 6 December 2010) was a Guyanese artist who created drawings, paintings and sculptures in a variety of media. He studied in the United Kingdom, and worked in Guyana and the United Kingdom before moving to the United States in 1979. He spent his last twenty years, perhaps the most productive and innovative period of his life, in Atlanta, Georgia. His eldest son is British sculptor Hew Locke.

== Biography ==
=== Birth and early education ===
Donald Locke was born on 17 September 1930 in Stewartville, Demerara County, Guyana. His father, also called Donald Locke, was a skilled carpenter who made furniture and his mother, Ivy Mae (née Harper), was a primary school teacher. The family moved to Georgetown in 1938, where Locke attended the Bourda Roman Catholic School and then the Smith's Church Congregational School. He went on to the Progressive High School, graduating in 1946. He was accepted as a student at the Broad Street Government School, where he became increasingly interested in drawing.

In 1947, Locke attended a Working People's Art Class (WPAC) taught in Georgetown by local artist Edward Rupert Burrowes. This inspired him to take up painting. Burrowes has often been called the "father of Guyanese art". Writing about Burrowes in the 1966 Guyana Independence Issue of New World, Locke describes how he was constantly engaged in "technical exploration", including making his own paints from unlikely ingredients and conducting experiments "with balata, buckram, tailor's canvas, rice bags, bitumen, concrete and ... clay mixed with molasses."

In 1950, Locke graduated with a Teacher's Certificate. Locke became a regular contributor to the annual WPAC exhibitions, and for a while was secretary of WPAC, helping to organise exhibitions in different locations. In 1952, WPAC gave him the First Prize Gold Medal Award for his abstract painting The Happy Family. He was given a British Council art scholarship in 1954, the last such scholarship to be awarded in Guyana in this period, with which he was able to study ceramics at the Bath School of Art and Design at Corsham, England. The Guyana Department of Education provided an additional scholarship that funded his third year at Corsham. He was taught painting by William Scott and Bryan Wynter, pottery by James Tower and sculpture by Ken Armitage and Bernard Meadows. He graduated in 1957 with a Teaching Certificate in Art Education.

=== Guyana and United Kingdom ===
Returning to Georgetown in 1957, Locke began teaching art at Dolphin Government School and at WPAC. In 1958, he married Leila Locke (née) Chaplin, a teacher whom he had met at Corsham. He did not have normal potter's equipment, but was able to make and successfully fire large earthenware pots using an improvised kiln. In 1959 the Guyanese government gave him a grant to study for a master's degree in fine arts at Edinburgh College of Art, a school in the University of Edinburgh. There he met the artists Dave Cohen, Sheldon Kaganof and Dion Myers, who introduced the ideas of the California Clay Movement to Britain. For many years Locke's work reflected their influence.

In 1962, Locke obtained a grant from Edinburgh University to go to Florence and Ravenna, where he undertook historical research He completed his graduate thesis in 1964 and returned to Georgetown to take up a position as Art Master at Queen's College, where he taught from 1964 until 1970. He began painting due to lack of facilities for pottery. In 1969, he obtained a British Council bursary that let him take leave from Queen's College and return to the Edinburgh College of Art for research in ceramic techniques. In 1970, after a trip to Brazil sponsored by the Brazilian Ministry of Foreign Affairs, he resigned from Queen's College and moved to London, where he obtained work teaching ceramics. His work began to incorporate materials such as metal, wood, leather, fur and ceramics. He gained a growing recognition for his ceramic work, and in 1972 was invited to exhibit at the Victoria and Albert Museum in the International Exhibition of Ceramics.

=== United States ===
Locke visited the United States for the first time in 1976, as guest artist at Haystack Mountain School of Crafts in Montville, Maine. In 1999, he was awarded a Guggenheim Fellowship in Sculpture, and for a year was an artist in residence at Arizona State University. His first of many bronze sculptures were cast by the Arizona Bronze Foundry in 1980. He divorced Leila in the late 1970s, and obtained permanent residency status in the United States, marrying Art Consultant Brenda Stephenson in 1981. In 1983 he moved to Phoenix, Arizona. Locke lived in the southwest of the United States for 11 years. During this period he was the Arizona correspondent for Artspace magazine, for which he wrote a series of articles. He also wrote for the Phoenix New Times and for Arts Magazine.

In 1989 he temporarily abandoned sculpture in favour of painting, and the next year moved to Atlanta, Georgia. His paintings combined heavy paint, photographs, cloth, wood, metal and found objects mounted on canvas. In 1992, with a five-year grant for a studio at the Nexus Contemporary Art Center, he returned to sculpture. Locke taught part-time at Georgia State University and at the Atlanta College of Art, retiring from teaching in 1996. He continued to write about art. Thus a review by Locke of the Okiek Portraits exhibition of photographs of Okiek people in traditional dress appeared in Creative Loafing of November 1997. He contributed a weekly review to this paper for three years. He lived in Atlanta for the remainder of his life, with growing recognition from exhibitions of his work in the US and Europe.

He was described as an outgoing and generous person. Locke enjoyed entertaining people at dinners he personally prepared. He loved to talk about art, and was an engaging speaker. He has been called "a larger-than-life personality and a wonderful storyteller, as influential in his conversation as he was with his art."

Donald Locke died at home in Atlanta on 6 December 2010. He was survived by three children from his marriage with the artist Leila Locke: Corinne, Jonathan and Hew. Hew Locke, born in Edinburgh, is also a well-known artist.

== Work ==
Locke's work was highly varied. Marianne Lambert, an Atlanta curator and art patron, said: "His expressiveness ran the gamut from frenzied drawings to the spare, clean lines of his sculptures." According to Carl Hazlewood of Newark, associate editor at NKA, a Journal of Contemporary African Art, "Donald's art grew out of sophisticated European traditions acquired during his studies in Guyana and Great Britain, but it also was infused with the myths and poetic aspects of his Guyana homeland and its folklore." A prolific artist throughout his life, Locke in his earlier modernist work was influenced by other schools. He came into his own as a unique individual in Atlanta under the influence of local folk artists such as Thornton Dial.

Talking of the influence of the open savannah landscape of Guyana on Locke's early work, one writer said Locke was "concerned with the question of space as it confronts the artist: what to do with nothingness; how to lead the eye of the viewer into a vast expanse through the narrow frame of a single painting." In the United Kingdom his best known work may be the paintings and sculptures in The Plantation Series, described as "forms held in strict lines and grids, connected as if with chains or a series of bars, analogous he has said, to the system whereby one group of people are kept in economic and political subjugation by another." A reviewer commenting on his work Trophies of Empire 1, 1972–1974 said it "comprise[s] robust disconnected forms that eerily echo the cultures and geographies he had experienced. Heavy metal vessels, solid wood forms and found objects are placed together creating awkward human effigies or challenging abstract assemblages. Their loaded erotic and sometimes violent symbolism bring to mind mournful memories from the past and issues related to slavery, identity and sovereignty. His are sombre images of the Black Atlantic world that Locke straddled so boldly."

== Exhibitions ==
Locke was Guyana's representative at the 12th São Paulo Art Biennial in 1971. He exhibited his Two Sculptures from a Ritual Fertility Suite in Hungary in 1975 at the International Biennale of Sculpture. In 1976 he had his own show at the Roundhouse in London, and in 1977 his work was displayed in Nigeria at FESTAC. His Trophies of Empire was first displayed at the Afro-Caribbean Art Exhibition in 1978, and was shown again at London's Hayward Gallery in 1989 in The Other Story, an influential show that helped to increase public awareness of the quality of work of Asian, African and Caribbean artists, and also featured other Caribbean artists such as Aubrey Williams and Ronald Moody, as well the paintings of Black British artists including Sonia Boyce. The art critic Brian Sewell said that Locke's sculptures in The Other Story showed exquisite mastery and extraordinary ingenuity.

In 1994 Locke went to Ecuador, where his work was shown in the exhibition Current Identities at the Cuenca Bienal of Painting, along with the work of other artists including Whitfield Lovell, Philemona Williamson, Emilio Cruz and Freddy Rodríguez. A 2002 exhibition at the Solomon Projects gallery in Atlanta featured rough wax sculptures that represented the sacred symbols of Locke's Guyanese creole heritage. In 2009 an exhibition of about fifty of his recent sculptures and paintings named Pork Knocker Dreams was staged in England. "Porkknocker" is the name given to gold prospectors in Guyana: Locke's father had prospected as a young man.

Locke exhibited in many other group and solo shows, including in São Paulo, Brazil; Medellín, Colombia; Budapest, Hungary; Faenza, Italy; Victoria and Albert Museum and Whitechapel Gallery in London, United Kingdom; Nottingham, United Kingdom; Aljira Center for Contemporary Art in Newark, New Jersey; Nexus Biennial and the Master Artist Series, Atlanta, Georgia; Studio Museum in Harlem, New York. His gallery shows included Nexus and City Gallery East in Atlanta and the Museum of Contemporary Art, Tucson, Arizona.

=== Solo exhibitions ===
A partial list of solo exhibitions:

Date	City	Location	Title / Notes
1975	London (UK)	Commonwealth Institute	DONALD LOCKE
2002	Atlanta (GA)	Solomon Projects	DONALD LOCKE
4 April 2003	Atlanta (GA)	City Hall Gallery East	DONALD LOCKE: The Road to El Dorado: 12 Years in Atlanta
8 May – 2 June 2004	New York (NY)	Skoto Gallery	DONALD LOCKE: Paintings and Mixed Media Sculpture
15 April – 7 July 2004	Newark (NJ)	Aljira, A Center for Contemporary Art	Bending the Grid: Modernity, Identity and the Vernacular in the Work of DONALD LOCKE
16 October – 22 November 2008	New York (NY)	Skoto Gallery	DONALD LOCKE: Master Works, Recent Works
26 September – 19 December 2009	Nottingham (UK)	New Art Exchange	DONALD LOCKE: Pork Knocker Dreams

=== Group exhibitions ===
A partial list of group exhibitions:

Date	City	Location	Title / Notes
30 September – 30 October 1981	PHOENIX (AZ)	Arizona Bank Galleria	Artists of the Black Community of Arizona
26 May – 19 August 1988	PHOENIX (AZ)	Phoenix Opportunities Industrialization Center	Artists of the Black Community/USA
28 November 1989 – 4 February 1990	LONDON (UK)	Hayward Gallery	The Other Story: Afro-Asian Artists in Post-War Britain
May 1994	NEW YORK (NY)	Studio Museum in Harlem	The Studio Museum in Harlem: 25 Years of African-American Art
1994	ATLANTA (GA)	Camille Love Gallery	Dimensions of Guyana
22 March – 7 June 2003	ATLANTA (GA)	The Contemporary	2003 Atlanta Biennial
25 June – 25 July 2004	ATLANTA (GA)	City Gallery East.	Atlanta Collects / Women
10 September – 27 November 2004	ATLANTA (GA)	Museum of Contemporary Art of Georgia	Transitions II
7 June – 4 September 2005	LONDON (UK)	Whitechapel Art Gallery	Back to Black: Art, Cinema, and the Racial Imaginary
2006	ATLANTA (GA)	Spruill Center Gallery	CHANGE: Work by Lucinda Bunnen, Annette Cone-Skelton, Donald Locke, Rocio Rodruguez
18 February – 29 May 2009	COLLEGE PARK (MD)	David C. Driskell Center, University of Maryland	Tradition Redefined: The Larry and Brenda Thompson Collection of African American Art
7 July – 6 August 2011	NEW YORK (NY)	Skoto Gallery	Summer Show
13 August – 3 September 2011	BROOKLYN (NY)	FiveMyles	Contemporary Expressions: Art from the Guyana Diaspora
