= Susan Campbell =

Susan Campbell may refer to:

- Susan Campbell (illustrator and author) (1931–2024), British expert on walled kitchen gardens, food writer and illustrator
- Sue Campbell, Baroness Campbell of Loughborough (born 1948), British sports administrator
- Susan Campbell Bartoletti (born 1958), American writer of children's literature
- Susan Foreman, a character from Doctor Who, also known as Susan Campbell in spin-off media
- Susan Goethel Campbell (born 1956), American book artist
- Sue Campbell (philosopher) (1956–2011), Canadian philosopher
- Sue Ann Campbell, Canadian applied mathematician and computational neuroscientist

== See also ==
- Suzanne Campbell, Irish television director, producer and food writer
