= Victor Davson =

Victor Davson (born 1948) is a Guyanese-born artist living and working in West Orange, New Jersey. Davson is a co-founder of Aljira, a Center for Contemporary Art located in Newark, New Jersey. Davson and Carl E. Hazlewood founded Aljira together in 1983 as a non-profit center for contemporary visual art to promote the work of emerging and under-represented artists.

== Early life and background ==
Davson was born in Georgetown, Guyana, and emigrated to the United States in 1973. He received a BFA from the Pratt Institute in Brooklyn, New York.

== Art ==
Victor Davson's subject matter draws from his early childhood in the Caribbean, including issues such as the anti-colonial politics of that region, with inspiration from writers and activists such as Martin Carter, Frantz Fanon, and Walter Rodney. Throughout his career most of his work has focused on painting and printmaking. He has created a series of paintings on LP record album covers.

Davson's creative career, with a concentration on painting, has spanned more than 40 years. He has been featured in many notable institutions, with exhibitions at such locations as Francis Kyle Gallery in London, Rush Arts Gallery in New York, the Bertha V.B. Lederer Gallery, at the State University of New York at Geneseo, the New Jersey State Museum, Jersey City Museum, Newark Museum and the Morris Museum.

Year	Fellowship or Award
2011	New Jersey State Council on the Arts Fellowship Award
1997	J. Paul Getty Trust
1995	The Wheeler Foundation
1994	Pollock/Krasner Foundation
1993	Rutgers Center for Innovative Print and Paper Fellowship
1989	Prudential Leadership in Culture and the Arts
1988	Nouveau Noir (in conjunction with Jonction Internacional exhibit, Nice, France)
1986	New Jersey State Council on the Arts Visual Arts Fellowship
1983	New Jersey State Council on the Arts Visual Arts Fellowship
1973	Artist in Residence, The Studio Museum in Harlem
1971	The Burnham Art Medal—National Painting of the Year Award, Georgetown, Guyana

== Aljira, a Center for Contemporary Art ==
In 1983, Victor Davson and Carl E. Hazlewood co-founded Aljira, a Center for Contemporary Art, a not-for-profit venture, to promote the work of emerging and under-represented artists. Aljira was located in downtown Newark, New Jersey, and had been designated by the New Jersey State Council on the Arts as a Major Arts Organization
