= Angela Hennessy =

American artist and educator

- Education: California College of the Arts
- Known for: textile arts
- Awards: San Francisco Foundation Visual Arts Artadia Award, 2019 Joan Mitchell Fellowship, 2021
- Website: www.angelahennessy.com

Angela Hennessy is an American artist and educator. She holds an MFA and is an associate professor at the California College of the Arts, and co-founder of SeeBlackWomxn. Hennessy teaches courses on visual and cultural narratives of death in contemporary art. She primarily works with textiles. She uses synthetic and human hair to create large-scale sculptures addressing cultural narratives of the body and mortality. Through writing, studio work, and performance, her practice addresses death and the dead themselves. Hennessy constructs “ephemeral and celestial forms” with every day gestures of domestic labor—washing, wrapping, stitching, weaving, brushing, and braiding.

== Career ==
=== Exhibitions ===
Hennessy's work has been exhibited at pt. 2 Gallery and Pro Arts Gallery, Oakland, CA; Museum of the African Diaspora, Southern Exposure, SOMArts Cultural Center, Contemporary Jewish Museum, The Growlery, Thacher Gallery at the University of San Francisco, and Ampersand International Arts, San Francisco, CA; Bellevue Arts Museum, Bellevue, WA; The Richmond Art Center, Richmond, CA; and The Oakland Museum of California, Oakland, CA, among others. Her work is in the permanent collection of the Cornell Fine Arts Museum.

=== Awards ===
She has received awards from Artadia, Svane Family Foundation, Aninstantia Foundation and the Joan Mitchell Foundation.

=== Publications ===
Her work has been featured in Sculpture Magazine, The New Yorker, Nat Brut, Surface Design Journal, Juxtapoz Magazine, among others.

=== SeeBlackWomxn ===
SeeBlackWomxn, founded by Tahirah Rasheed and Hennessy, is a Black feminist art movement that centers and elevates the work of Black women through a multi-generational and transnational lens. SeeBlackWomxn’s nationally recognized campaign, See Black Womxn: Rising A Campaign to Abolish White Supremacy at SFAC, was initiated after the 2019 controversy surrounding the acceptance and subsequent rescindment of artist Lava Thomas’ proposal for a public artwork honoring Maya Angelou for the San Francisco Public Library’s main branch. Hennessy served as a juror on the SFAC selection panel that made the initial nomination of Thomas’ proposal. In 2020, Thomas was re-awarded the commission.

== Personal life ==
She lives and works in Oakland, CA.

In 2015, Hennessy survived a gunshot wound while interrupting a violent assault on the street in front of her house. Following the experience, she wrote her manifesto, The School of the Dead, which moves between poetry, prayer, and call to action.

Hennessy worked as a hospice volunteer and is certified in the Grief Recovery Method and trained with Final Passages and the International End of Life Doula Association. She also serves on the advisory board of Recompose.
