= Daniel Walsh =

Daniel Walsh may refer to:

- Daniel Walsh (rower) (born 1979), American rower
- Daniel Walsh (born 2002), Australian footballer with Perth Glory
- Daniel B. Walsh (1935–2018), New York politician
- Daniel F. Walsh (born 1937), American prelate of the Roman Catholic Church
- Dan Walsh (artist) (born 1960), American painter, printmaker and bookmaker
- Dan Walsh (banjo player), British banjoist and guitarist
- Danny Walsh (1893–1933), American gangster
- Danny Walsh (soccer) (born 1944), Australian soccer player
