= Fueki =

Fueki (Japanese: 笛木) is a surname of Japanese origin. Notable people with the surname include:

- Chie Fueki (born 1973), Japanese-American painter
- Yuko Fueki (born 1979), Japanese-Korean actress
- Yasuhiro Fueki (born 1985), Japanese male hurdler
