= CTRL+SHFT =

Artist studio based in California

- Formation: 2015
- Founded at: West Oakland, California
- Type: Collective
- Purpose: Women, women of color, queer, genderqueer, and non-binary artists
- Website: http://ctrlshftcollective.com

CTRL+SHFT was an artist collective, exhibition space, and shared artist studio based in West Oakland, California. Founded in 2015, the rotating members identified as women, women of color, queer, genderqueer, and/or non-binary, and their work includes essays, visual art, exhibition curation, community organization, lectures, public programming, and social practice.

== History ==
CTRL+SHFT was founded in 2015 by twelve Bay Area artists, many of whom met as recent graduates from the California College of the Art's Master of Fine Arts program. The collective began as a response to a lack of spaces to create identity-, race-, and gender-driven art, as well as the increasing financial cost of living in the Bay Area. The members built out thirteen artist studios in a 3,300 square-foot warehouse where they curated exhibitions and producing panels, zines, and talks for artists of color, women, queer, and gender non-conforming artists.

They were a recipient of Round 9 of Southern Exposure's Alternative Exposure grant in 2015.

In 2017, CTRL+SHFT collaborated with Nook Gallery on Women Talk Back, Talk Out, a series of readings, performances, and presentations. Artists such as Lindsay Tunkl and Grace Rosario Perkins investigated topics from psychoanalysis to cognitive therapy to the histories of the Navajo Nation and the Gila River Indian Community.

== Members ==
In 2015 the founding members of CTRL+SHFT collective consisted of Yerin Kim, Jessica Hubbard, Erica Molesworth, Addy Rabinovitch, Maria Guzman Capron, Megan Reed, Danielle Genzel, Channing Morgan, Beryl Bevilacque, Andrea Fritch, Sophie Ramos, and Katy Crocker.

As of 2018, the CTRL+SHFT collective consisted of Lukaza Branfman-Verissimo, Allison Chalco, Caroline Charuk, Kenyatta A.C. Hinkle, Jessica Hubbard, Jay Katelansky, Em Meine, Erica Molesworth, Addy Rabinovitch, Megan Reed, Lindsay Tunkl, and Maryam Yousif.

CTRL+SHFT ceased operating during the COVID-19 pandemic.
