= Freddy Rodríguez (artist) =

American abstract artist

- Born: 1945; Santiago de los Caballeros, Dominican Republic
- Died: October 10, 2022 (aged 76–77); Queens, New York
- Education: Art Students League of New York, New School for Social Research, Fashion Institute of Technology
- Occupation: Artist
- Awards: Painters & Sculptors Grant, Joan Mitchell Foundation, 1995 Creating a Living Legacy, Joan Mitchell Foundation, 2013 Smithsonian Artist Research Fellowship, 2016 New York Community Trust—Oscar Williams & Gene Derwood Award, 2020
- Website: freddyrodriguez.com

Freddy Rodríguez (1945 – October 10, 2022) was an American artist born in the Dominican Republic, who lived and worked in New York since 1963. Much of his work takes the form of large hard-edge geometric abstractions. His paintings have been widely exhibited and are held in several important collections.

== Early life ==
Freddy Rodríguez was born in Santiago de los Caballeros in the Dominican Republic in 1945. He comes from a family of Dominican artists including Yoryi Morel.

In 1963, Rodríguez immigrated to the United States for political reasons, during the period after the Rafael Trujillo assassination in 1961. In New York, he often visited the Metropolitan Museum of Art, where he was particularly inspired by the work of El Greco, Rembrandt, Goya, and Van Gogh. At the Museum of Modern Art he preferred Pablo Picasso, Paul Cézanne and Piet Mondrian.

He studied painting at the Art Students League of New York under Sidney Dickinson; and at The New School with John Dobbs and Carmen Cicero. He also studied textile design at the Fashion Institute of Technology.

== Career ==
In the 1980s, he joined several other visual artists including Bismark Victoria, Eligio Reynoso, Magno Laracuente and Tito Canepa to form "Dominican Visual Artists of New York." This group was successful in obtaining sponsorship for exhibitions of Dominican Art in popular locations. In 1991, the New York Foundation for the Arts named him "Gregory Millard Fellow in Painting." In 1992, he was an NYSCA Artist in Residence at El Museo del Barrio. Rodríguez was a contributing artist to the Flight 587 Memorial located at Belle Harbor, Queens and dedicated in 2006.

Rodríguez's artistic practice was influenced by Rembrandt, Paul Cézanne and Piet Mondrian. His style incorporates elements of Abstract Expressionism, Pop and Minimalism. In 2011 the Smithsonian American Art Museum acquired three of his early works, painted in the early 1970s. Tall and narrow, the abstract paintings named Danza Africana, Amor Africano, and Danza de Carnaval represent the energy of Dominican music through vibrant colors and zigzagging lines. A reviewer has discussed the political messages in his work, mourning the impact of colonialism and subsequent dictatorships on the original Caribbean paradise, saying, "The political messages are subsumed by the artist's desire to create beautiful paintings fusing Renaissance and modern traditions. Integrating illusionistic space with flattened surfaces, and contrasting loose and tight brushstrokes, the artist enters a dialogue with centuries of art concerned with these same pictorial issues." His 1974 painting Y me quedé sin nombre is the first work by a Dominican-born New York artist to be acquired by the Whitney Museum of American Art.

Rodríguez died on October 10, 2022 in Queens, New York

== Exhibitions ==
Rodríguez has exhibited widely in museums, galleries, biennials, and art fairs. In 1994, Rodríguez's work was shown as part of the American contingent at the IV Bienal Internacional de Pintura en Cuenca, Ecuador. Other American artists exhibiting at this show were Donald Locke, Philemona Williamson, Whitfield Lovell and Emilio Cruz.

== Selected Permanent Collections ==
- Whitney Museum of American Art, New York
- Smithsonian American Art Museum, Washington, DC
- National Portrait Gallery, Washington, DC
- El Museo del Barrio, New York
- National Gallery of Art, Washington, DC
