= Philemona Williamson =

American painter

- Born: 1951 (age 74–75); New York City
- Occupation: Artist
- Known for: Seasons

Philemona Williamson (born 1951) is an artist from New York City.

== Biography ==
Williamson was born in NYC in 1951. Her African-American parents were employed by a wealthy Greek family, and she grew up in their Manhattan home. She recalls a diversity of cultures but no racism when growing up. Her father was the chauffeur and her mother the housekeeper. She said of the environment in the home on Sutton Place that she and her parents maintained "a kind of quiet gentility" while their employers were involved in an endless "Greek passion play." She attended Bennington College, earning a bachelor's degree in 1973, and went on to NYU where she obtained a master's degree in 1979. At Bennington she embraced post-modernism, despite the fashion for abstraction in the department.

Williamson has worked at Parsons School of Design, The Getty Institute for Education in the Arts, New York State Council on the Arts, University of North Carolina Chapel Hill, Bard College, Rhode Island School of Design and Metropolitan Museum of Art. She was awarded a Joan Mitchell Foundation grant in 2020. Other awards include a National Endowment for the Arts Fellowship in Painting (2018), Pollock-Krasner Foundation Grant (1990) and New York Foundation for the Arts Fellowship (2009). As of 2010 she lived and worked in Upper Montclair, New Jersey, with a studio in Bloomfield.

== Work and reception ==
Williamson prefers to paint with oil on linen. Many of her pictures show children and adolescents, drawing on her imagination and her own childhood. The paintings, in vibrant colors, may be interpreted as showing sadness or childhood innocence. Her work is postmodernist, figurative art in which she explores her private identity. She has said, "I do not make 'black art'. If my work bridges racial gaps, it is because I am sharing a part of myself and I happen to be black. My paintings are about my fascination with color and shape." In her words, "My paintings are of pre-adolescent girls and boys, children on the cusp of adulthood. The figures struggle to balance their innocence and awkwardness with their newfound sexuality. The figures are involved in their own drama when the observer discovers them; it is a surprise to both. The questions begin at this point…Who are these children? What are they doing and why? Ethnicity and gender are questioned."

According to art essayist Nina Felshin, "Life, in Philemona Williamson's paintings, appears to be a balancing act in which there are two sides to every coin and the action intentionally raises more questions than it answers." Art critic Catherine Bernard has said, "The tension of the figures, the colors, and the distortion of space are all shadows, however faint, of our dismembered memories."

In 1992, she received an Arts in Transit Poster Commission at New York's Union Square Station. Her Folktales from Around the World (2003) is a set of four glass mosaic murals at the Glen Oaks Campus School in Queens. Her work is held by the Sheldon Museum of Art in Lincoln, Nebraska; the Mint Museum in Charlotte, North Carolina; Hampton University museum in Hampton, Virginia; Mott-Warsh Art Collection, Flint, Michigan; Reader's Digest Art Collection and AT&T. Her Seasons decorates the Livonia Avenue (BMT Canarsie Line) subway station in New York City. This 2007 work is a set of stained glass windows on the platform windscreens depicted events related to the four seasons of meteorology. Her pictures have been published as illustrations in Harper's Magazine.

== Exhibitions ==
In 1994, Williamson's work was shown as part of the American contingent at the IV Bienal Internacional de Pintura en Cuenca, Ecuador. Other American artists exhibiting at this show were Donald Locke, Whitfield Lovell, Emilio Cruz and Freddy Rodríguez. Williamson's work has been displayed in many group and individual exhibitions in locations such as SUNY College in Old Westbury, New York; the John Michael Kohler Arts Center in Sheboygan, Wisconsin, the African American Museum in Hempstead, New York; the Queens Museum of Art in New York City, the Montclair Art Museum and the Bronx Museum of the Arts in New York City.

Selected solo exhibitions:

- 1988: Philemona Williamson: Recent Paintings, The Queens Museum of Art, Queens, New York
- 1989: Wenger Gallery, Los Angeles, CA
- 1990: Paintings, June Kelly Gallery, New York Fine Arts Gallery, Southampton College of Long Island University, Southampton, New York
- 1991: African American Museum, Hempstead, New York
- 1992: New Paintings, June Kelly Gallery, New York, Powers Art Gallery, East Stroudsburg University, PA
- 1993: Inaugural Exhibition, Flushing Council on Culture & Arts, New York
- 1993: Selected Paintings, Pennsylvania State University, University Park, PA
- 1994: Philemona Williamson: Fables and Fantasies, Hypo-Bank, New York; catalogue
- 1995: New Paintings, June Kelly Gallery, New York
- 1998: Recent Paintings, June Kelly Gallery, New York
- 1999: Time and Memory: Paintings by Philemona Williamson, John Michael, Kohler Arts Center, Sheboygan, WI
- 2000: New Paintings, June Kelly Gallery, New York
- 2001: Philemona Williamson/Barbara Friedman, curated by Catherine Bernard, Amelie A. Wallace Gallery, college at Old Westbury, New York
- 2003: New Paintings, June Kelly Gallery, New York; catalogue
- 2006: New Paintings, June Kelly Gallery, New York
- 2008: "Sudden Passage", essay by Cynthia Nadelman, June Kelly Gallery, New York
- 2008 October/November: Philemona Williamson: New Paintings - June Kelly Gallery (New York - Soho)
- 2009: Philemona Williamson Exhibition, curated by Bertha Gutman, Delaware County Community College, Media, PA; brochure
- 2010 November: Fractured Tales, June Kelly Gallery, New York
- 2011 September: The Art of Giving Back, Visual Arts Gallery - The School of Visual Arts
- 2012 March: Celebrating 25 Years, June Kelly Gallery
