= Kenyatta A.C. Hinkle =

American artist

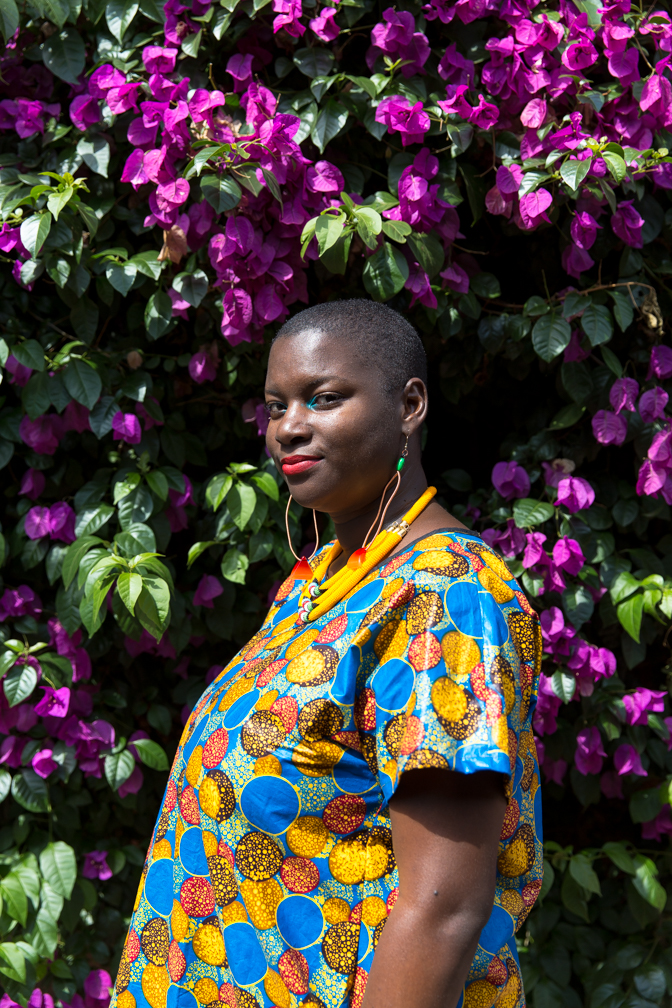
- Hinkle in 2016
- Born: 1987 (age 38–39); Louisville, Kentucky
- Website: www.kachstudio.com

Kenyatta A.C. Hinkle (born 1987), also known as Olomidara Yaya, is an American artist and author. She was previously an assistant professor at the University of California at Berkeley Department of Art Practice. Her work focuses on questions of race, sexuality, and history through a variety of visual and textual mediums. She lives and works in Los Angeles, California. Notable works include the Kentifrica project, the Tituba series, The Evanesced, and the Uninvited series. She is a member of CTRL+SHFT Collective in Oakland, California.

== Early life ==
Hinkle was born in Louisville, Kentucky in 1987; her experiences with racism and colorism, especially as they expressed themselves in language, were essential to her later response to these ideas in art. Hinkle was inspired by her mother, herself an artist: because she lived in the segregated South, she was unable to pursue her creative identity. Hinkle's mother introduced the idea of "powerful self-possession" to her.

She lived in Baltimore, MD while studying at the Maryland Institute College of Art, where she occasionally attended local slam poetry events.

== Education ==
Kenyatta A.C. Hinkle studied painting (BFA) at Maryland Institute College of Art and writing (MFA) at California Institute of the Arts. She studied at the AICAD/New York Studio Residency Program in Brooklyn, NY from 2008 to 2009. She was a US Fulbright Fellow in Lagos, Nigeria from 2015 to 2016.

== Career ==
Hinkle was the youngest artist in the Made in LA Biennial. Her work, both performed and presented, has been featured in the Hammer Museum in Los Angeles, California, Project Row Houston in Houston, Texas, The California African American Museum, and The Studio Museum in Harlem in New York.

In 2014, Hinkle and six other black women created and led an event called Call & Response where each artist bought an object and explained what the object meant to them. Hinkle also led a panel with the question "Kentifrica is or Kentifrica ain't?" Students and faculty at the Antioch University also presented the research they found on Kentifrica. Hinkle was included in the 2019 traveling exhibition Young, Gifted, and Black: The Lumpkin-Boccuzzi Family Collection of Contemporary Art.

== Style and themes ==
By recreating artifacts, sharing narratives, and customs from research archives, I am able to reconstruct a Kentifrican identity.

— Kenyatta A.C. Hinkle

"[Kenyatta A.C. Hinkle's] work investigates race, sexuality and history using historical objects in visual and performance art constructs." An idea central to her work is the concept, cleverly appropriated from grammatical jargon, of a "Historical Present", which she defines as "the residue of history and how it affects our contemporary world perspective".

The constructed culture of Kentifrica is also a recurring theme in Hinkle's work. Kentifrica is "a physical and theoretical location conceived by Hinkle. Holding [her] investments in geography, Diaspora, personal vs. collective histories, and the problematics of museum space, Kentifrican artifacts in the gallery space often assume an active role in each shows' narrative". This culture places great value and emphasis on the community, which can be seen in the ways Hinkle assembles objects together to interrogate the colonial and white gaze. Themes of fluid sexuality and collective responsibility that are important to Kentifrican culture are also present in the tactics Hinkle employs in her works. They form close social circles in which gender strictures are not prevalent. The community focuses on education and social well-being. According to Hinkle's narrative, the practices and independence of this culture have prevailed even as other cultures have been dominated by European powers. The presence of this concept in Hinkle's work has a goal: "the Kentifrican figure has a distinct role to heal and empower people who are soft-targets for manipulation and abuse".

She often uses photographs with her artworks and explores what could result from that. For instance, some of her artworks can be seen as nude, but the subject is obscured or covered in some way. For example, The Contagion (2012) shows a young African girl nearly naked, but partly obscured by thick red lines resembling ropes and organic, natural forms.

== Artworks ==
=== Tituba Series ===
In Hinkle's drawing series, Tituba, she was inspired by Maryse Condé’s novel "I, Tituba: Black Witch of Salem" and relating to Tituba's experiences of being accused as a witch while recalling her own experiences of ostracization as a pregnant black woman. Her goal is to merge the experiences of inhabiting a black, pregnant body and the thought of the otherness that Condé depicted by expanding on the background of Tituba's life.

"It is this body that people don't know what to do with and so some of that discomfort [is] important to keep in there."

=== The Kentifrica Project ===
In Hinkle's The Kentrifrica Project, her goal is to create a collaborative space to examine Diaspora and cultural visibility. She invites communities to aid her in "reconstructing" the Kentrifican identity. The project is centered on the fictional, utopian continent of Kintifrica, described by Hinkle as "a contested geography/continent located between South America and Africa." The project is highly collaborative, developed through Hinkle's leading workshops and discussions that further expand its concept. Drawing on the collective histories of the artist, her collaborators, and participants, the work includes objects of Kentrifican culture, such as recipes, instruments, clothing, hairpieces, and maps. Cultural concepts that Hinkle has emphasized within Kentrifica include the absence of property ownership, gender equality, and a collectivist culture.

"Through the embodiment of various voices and modes of address, Hinkle examines what happens to bodies in transit and how they are contextualized culturally depending upon historical hegemonic signifiers of race and culture."

=== The Evanesced ===
In Hinkle's work The Evanesced, she creates amorphous representations of bodies: some feature dashes of color to accent certain parts. Hinkle offers a social commentary on missing Black women in America and the African Diaspora. She tries to give them voices through her work. "The women [...] are surrounded by brushstrokes and lines that seem to slide them onto the canvas, like ghosts that happened to materialize within her paintings". Hinkle confronts issues of sex trafficking, kidnappings, murder and other reasons for disappearances, simultaneously creating sympathy and posing a call to action. Hinkle thus ties The Evanesced to the #SayHerName Movement.

The series also includes a performance entitled The Evanesced: Embodied Disappearance. The performance draws on similar themes, and has a similar impact: "The Evanesced: Embodied Disappearance centers the death and ever-present afterlife of Black women to hold space for pain, remembrance, and healing". The performance piece, featuring Hinkle and her son, includes "a soundtrack of whispers, shuffles, and popular and underground music". The performance piece adds to the visual series a multi-dimensional examination of erasure and violence within the Black female experience.

=== The Uninvited ===
In Hinkle's series The Uninvited, she attempts to reclaim the subject's humanity and fights against objectification. Using the ephemeral, mass-produced medium of postcards, "Hinkle creates disruptive counternarratives by drawing and painting on top of late nineteenth and early twentieth-century postcards of West African women taken mainly by French colonists. These ethnographic photos sought to brand Black women's bodies as dehumanized figments of hypersexualization and conquest, triggering both repulsion and desire". These postcards were once used as a tool of French colonists to further the objectification of the women shown and thereby strengthen the power of the viewer, implied to be white and European. Hinkle challenges this power dynamic by covering up the women and giving them the power to dictate what is shown. She therefore exposes the harsh subjugation of women by men. At the same time, she obscures the women's bare bodies from the viewers. Hinkle "reconstructs and reimagines the women [from the postcards] through vivid drawings and unique placements on the canvas - in a sense restoring their loss of power". The role and obligation of the viewer is put into question here. It is said that photography is inherently violent, and yet many people indulge in this medium. Hinkle is also calling for people to face the horrific consequences of subjecting someone. There is a discomfort in the women's faces, but they are being seen as objects, and objects don't have voices. Hinkle is trying to get her audience to see the wrong that is being committed. Others have seen the drawn on lines as a representation of disease, meant to be a metaphor for colonialism.

Similarly to The Evanesced, The Uninvited dwells in history but connects to the present, furthering the notion of a "Historical Present" which is so central to Hinkle's work. In this series, she has connected the way West African women were treated in the French colonies with how Black women are treated in America today. Explaining the effect she hoped to create with the series, Hinkle stated in an interview: "Working with these women and having them transform me and me transform them, the whole body of work has literally been healing. I do a lot of my work [with] that idea of turning trauma into art". In all of her work, Kenyatta A.C. Hinkle uses the "Historical Present" to turn past trauma into current healing through art.

== Bibliography ==
- Hinkle, Kenyatta A. C. (2018). Kentrifications: Convergent Truth(s) and Realities. Los Angeles, Calif: Occidental College. OCLC 1108338028
- Hinkle, Kenyatta A. C. (2019). Sir. Brooklyn, New York: Litmus Press. ISBN 9781933959382.

== Recognition ==
Hinkle is the recipient of several fellowships and grants, including the Rema Hort Mann Foundation Emerging Artist Award, the Cultural Center for Innovation's Investing in Artists Grant, Social Practice in Art (SPart-LA), and the Jacob K. Javits Full Fellowship for Graduate Study. She is a recent alumna (2015–2016) of the US Fulbright Program, in which she conducted research at the University of Lagos in Lagos, Nigeria.

The Kentifrica project was featured in the Made in L.A. 2012, making her the youngest artist featured.

== Selected group exhibitions ==
- 2021 The Black Index (online only due to COVID-19 restrictions), University of California, Irvine (CAC Gallery), Irvine, California (January 14-March 20, 2021) with Dennis Delgado, Alicia Henry, Titus Kaphar, Whitfield Lovell, and Lava Thomas.
