= Tito Canepa =

Dominican painter

- Canepa, ca. 1942
- Born: 21 September 1916; San Pedro de Macorís, Dominican Republic
- Died: 11 February 2014 (aged 97); Charlotte, North Carolina, U.S.
- Education: Art Students League of New York
- Known for: Painting
- Spouse: Florence Lessing

Tito Enrique Canepa Jiménez (21 September 1916 – 11 February 2014) was a leading Dominican painter of the generation that came of age in the 1930s and 1940s. Canepa's artistic identity was shaped in New York City, where he lived from the age of 21, never returning to stay in his native country. Despite this distance, or perhaps because of it, as León David has pointed out, his works always evince a certain dominicanidad without his setting out to achieve it as a goal — a dominicanidad that is never folkloric. Of the three modernist Dominican painters of the 1930s and 40s singled out by Rafael Díaz Niese as most significant — Canepa, Colson and Suro — Canepa is the one whose artistic activity developed in the most continuous absence from his native country, and the one longest resident in New York. Cánepa is accented in Spanish but not in the original Ligurian.

== Biography ==
Desnuda sobre la yerba, oil on canvas, 86.4x61 cm, 1939, Smithsonian American Art Museum

Canepa was born in 1916 in San Pedro de Macorís in the Dominican Republic. His initial artistic studies were in his native country. After participating in the political movement against the Trujillo dictatorship his existence in the Dominican Republic became precarious, and he left for New York in 1935, settling there permanently in 1937 when he accepted a position in the New York Siqueiros workshop on 13th Street. There he worked under Roberto Berdecio on a number of murals, while attending class at the Art Students League. Exile intensified his childhood memories, which were colored by his maternal family's progressive republican and anti-colonial traditions. Two of his maternal ancestors had been presidents of the Dominican Republic: Manuel Jimenes (presidency 1848-1849), a product of the Enlightenment and abolitionism, and Juan Isidro Jimenes Pereyra (presidency 1902-1916). In addition, Canepa's art reflected his paternal Genovese family's seafaring history and his father's extravagant construction of a small opera theater in San Pedro de Macorís, the Teatro Colón. It was there, watching the Spanish painter Enrique Tarazona at work, that Canepa gained "the sweeping confidence and bold absorption of historical styles that characterizes much" of his painting, "absorbing his catechism of old masters at such an early age that it became a digested part of his work."

In New York he was steeped in the artistic and social ferment of the WPA period. He exhibited in the Bonestell and ACA galleries, and his early circle of friends, with whom he exchanged paintings and drawings, included the painters David Burliuk, Pavel Tchelitchew, Walter Houmère, Rufino Tamayo and Mario Carreño and (later) Edward Laning. Far from setting out to become a 'Dominican' painter, he felt himself to be part of a broader tradition. Here a key influence was his mentor, the Dominican art historian and musicologist Américo Lugo Romero. With Lugo he spent almost every day of the better part of a year in the Metropolitan Museum of Art, absorbing his mentor's working connoisseurship of Renaissance art as the two discussed and challenged attributions of paintings.

His earliest recognition in the Dominican Republic came from Rafael Díaz Niese, on the occasion of a show of self-portraits in 1943 at the Galería Nacional de Bellas Artes in Santo Domingo. Díaz Niese's essay established Canepa, Darío Suro and Jaime Colson as the trinity of Dominican artists who led the second generation of high modernism (1930s and 1940s). Of Canepa's now lost 1943 self-portrait, Díaz Niese wrote:

An intense inner life animated this small-sized work. All its elements indicated that its author was more than a mere painter, but rather a true artist: The strength of the lines, the realization of the volumes in a perfect succession of planes and the exquisite restraint with which he has been able to shape his youthful expressiveness while using a rather cool tonality – all of this makes it plain that the author possesses an exceptional artistic temperament.

Regarding other early works and against the background of Canepa's familiarity with Renaissance art, Díaz Niese summed up the outstanding qualities of his paintings:

... sobriety, the organizational logic of his compositions and the intense love for strongly drawn forms within an atmosphere of brightness and exquisite beauty. These qualities — according to Danilo de los Santos citing Díaz Niese — which are tied to the preeminence of the human figure as the subject of painting, are reinforced as his art reaches a "certain sense of monumentality (…) visible even in his smaller figures, which magnify an admirably precise and severe draftsmanship.

In his early works, according to Edward Sullivan, "the figures are solidly constructed in an almost sculptural fashion. They exist in a seemingly timeless realm"; in works of the 1970s he seems to be paying homage to Mantegna, Piero and other Quattrocento artists who "demonstrated such interest in the cool, calm and quasi-mathematical measuring of space. Many of these compositions are highly expansive and suggest the ambitious spatial descriptions of mural paintings."

The Dream, acrylic on gesso panel, 91.4x121.9 cm, 1975, private collection.

Dream symbolism, the "nostalgic search for a vanished land" and the exploration of the "mysterious realm of family and childhood" are among the themes that León David identified in Canepa's work.

During the Second World War Canepa served in the US Army's Signal Corps making propaganda films. In 1944 he married the modern dancer Florence Lessing.

In the 1950s, from New York, he was centrally involved in the group of political leaders planning to bring down the dictator of the Dominican Republic Trujillo.

In the 1970s his work was the object of a series of articles in Dominican newspapers, notably those by María Ugarte, a leading expert on the country's cultural and artistic heritage, in El Caribe, and by poet and art critic León David, in El Síglo. This renewed interest was largely triggered by one event: the efforts of a member of the Trujillo family to seize his historical triptych Enriquillo – Duarte – Luperón (1971) while still in the Santo Domingo airport. The new appreciation culminated in the publication in 1988 of León David's monograph.

Triptych: Enriquillo-Duarte-Luperón, acrylic on gesso boards, 182.88x91.44 cm, 1971, private collection.

In the 1980s Canepa together with several other Dominican artists, including Bismarck Victoria, Freddy Rodríguez and Magno Laracuente formed the Dominican Visual Artists of New York (DVANY), which organized several important exhibitions.

In 1992 he was the recipient of a lifetime achievement award from the Fundación Ciencia y Arte of the Dominican Republic, with "the eternal gratitude of the Dominican people for [his] pictorial oeuvre."

In the 1990s, Canepa exhibited his work in a number of shows, including a show of Latin American art at the Mexican Cultural Institute in Washington DC and the Step Gallery in New York. In 1996 his by now famous triptych Enriquillo - Duarte - Luperón was chosen as the cover illustration for the most important group show of Dominican art ever to have been mounted outside the country: Modern and Contemporary Art from the Dominican Republic co-organised by the Spanish Institute and Americas Society, New York, in which his works occupied a significant place. The exhibition also travelled to the Bass Museum of Art, Miami Beach.

In 2005, the CUNY Dominican Studies Institute inaugurated their archives with an extensive collection of Tito Canepa's letters, drawings and photographs, along with three paintings: Ojeda y Caonabo (1984), The Sisters Mirabál (1985) and The Gulf of Arrows (1987).

In 2008 the Fundación Global Democracia y Desarollo (Global Foundation for Democracy and Development) and the CUNY Dominican Studies Institute organized a show at the Galería de Arte FUNGLODE in Santo Domingo, Tito Cánepa – 60 Years of Asserting Dominican Art in the United States.

In 2008 the Second International and Interdisciplinary Conference on Dominican Studies "Dominicans in the U.S. Prior to 1970 - Recovering an Earlier Dominican Presence. Dedicated to Camila Henríquez Ureña and Tito Cánepa" was held at Hostos Community College in New York City.

In February/March 2013 the CUNY Dominican Studies Institute presented an exhibit El Músico y el Pintor/ The Musician and the Painter: Petitón Guzmán and Tito Enrique Cánepa — An Exhibit Documenting the Lifetime, Work, and Artistic Trajectory of Two Early Twentieth Century Dominican Artists in New York.

In 2018 the Smithsonian American Art Museum acquired two paintings by Tito Canepa: Nude in the Grass (Desnuda sobre la yerba) and The Jester (El disfraz).

== Bibliography ==
- Brown, Isabel Zakrzewski (1999). Culture and Customs of the Dominican Republic. Greenwood Publishing Group. p. 174. ISBN 978-0-313-30314-2., p. 174.
- David, León, Cánepa, 1988 – preface by Jerrilynn D. Dodds. Santo Domingo: Galería de Arte Moderno, 1988.
- De los Santos, Danilo, Memoria de la pintura dominicana, Vol. II. Santo Domingo: Grupo León Jimenes, 2003. http://www.glj.com.do/a/d/doc-pintura2.4.pdf
- De los Santos, Danilo, Address at Opening Panel "Tito Cánepa – 60 Years of Asserting Dominican Art in the United States", FUNGLODE exhibition 2008.
- Díaz Niese, Rafael, Quadernos de Cultura Dominicana, No. 12 (1944), pp. 33–34.
- Miller, Jeannette: Arte dominicano: 1844-2000 two volumes (Verizon, 2001 y 2002).
- Pellegrini, Elena, "Artist Biographies" in Modern and Contemporary Art of the Dominican Republic. Elizabeth Ferrer and Edward J. Sullivan, curators. Suzanne Stratton, ed. New York: Americas Society and the Spanish Institute, 1996, p. 114.
- Sullivan, Edward J., Modern and Contemporary Art from the Dominican Republic. Americas Society / Spanish Institute (New York: 1996) (with Jeannette Miller).
- Sullivan, Edward J., Tito Canepa: An Exhibition of Early and Recent Paintings, September 3-September 30, 1992, Step Gallery, New York. New York: Step Gallery, 1992.
- Rodríguez de León, Francisco, El Furioso Merengue del Norte. Una Historia de la Comunidad Dominicana en los Estados Unidos, New York: Editorial Sitel, 1998, pp. 133–134.
- Torres-Saillant, Silvio, and Ramona Hernández, The Dominican Americans. Westport. CT: Greenwood Press, 1998, pp. 122–124.
- Ugarte, María, Supplement to El Caribe, 15 January 1994.
