= Carl E. Hazlewood =

American artist and writer

Carl E. Hazlewood is an artist, writer, and curator currently residing in Brooklyn, New York. Hazlewood, along with Victor Davson, is a co-founder of Aljira Center for Contemporary Art in Newark, New Jersey. Hazlewood has taught at New Jersey City University and other institutions.

Since 1984 he has organized numerous curatorial projects for Aljira such as Modern Life (co-curated with Okwui Enwezor). Hazlewood's project on behalf of Aljira, Current Identities, Recent Painting in the United States, was the US prize-winning representation at the Bienal International de Pintura, Cuenca, Ecuador, in 1994.

== Early life and education ==
Carl E. Hazlewood was born in Guyana, South America, and later emigrated to the United States. At the age of 13 he began attending Pratt Institute, in Brooklyn, NY, and later received a BFA with honors from Pratt Institute. Later Hazlewood received a Master of Art from Hunter College. In addition he received a scholarship to attend Skowhegan School of Painting and Sculpting, as well as the Brooklyn Museum of Art School.

== Art ==
Hazlewood works with a number of different mediums, including modern performance installations, mixed-media, sculpture, abstract drawing, painting, photography, and digital exhibition/performance. Describing his own work, Hazlewood says:

For a culturally complex 'black' person from the Caribbean there were, inevitably, demanding questions concerning painting's relevance. As a curator and someone interested in theoretical aspects of art, it seemed necessary to take all these polemical ideas into consideration. But working now, in photography and multimedia installations, my interest is in paring down complexities to essential practical ideas; particularly those basic ones that concern the visual and establishing an assertive abstract image. New constructions are made mostly of paper, twine, canvas, and other materials attached directly to the wall. Unframed, the bounding edges are unrestricted, left free to respond to the visual 'pressures' of what happens within the piece.

== Career ==
Hazlewood's mother was an artist, and as such, he has been around artists and has been making art for most of his life. He is currently a member of the Brooklyn Arts Council, a member of American Abstract Artists, an editor for Nka: Journal of Contemporary African Art, at Duke University, a contributing writer at Flash Art International, ART PAPERS Magazine, and NY Arts Magazine. Hazlewood has also worked as a curator for a number of projects including work at Aljira, the not-for-profit art center he co-founded; The Nathan Cummings Foundation, New York; Studio Museum in Harlem, New York; Hallwalls, New York; Artists Space, New York; and P.S.122, New York.

== Aljira, a Center for Contemporary Art ==
Hazlewood with Victor Davson co-founded Aljira, a not-for-profit contemporary visual art center, in 1983, to promote the work of emerging and under-represented artists. Aljira is located in downtown Newark, New Jersey, and has been designated by the New Jersey Council on the Arts as a Major Arts Organization.

== Honors and awards ==
Hazlewood has earned many accolades for his work. Listed below are some of his most significant recognitions.

Year	Honor or Award
2018	Dieu Donné Workspace Fellow
2016	Art Omi International Artist Residency
2015	MacDowell Fellow The TransCanada Fellow The Mrs. Giles Whiting Foundation Award Triangle International Artists Workshop BRIC 2015 Visual Artist Residency
2012	Triangle International Artists Workshop
2010	The Joan Mitchell Foundation Grant nominee New York City Council Citation for Community Service The Guyana Cultural Association of NY Award for contribution in the Arts
2002	Awarded Commission for Public Art at the Bronx River project
1997	The Wheeler Foundation Grant
