= Alicia Henry =

American visual artist

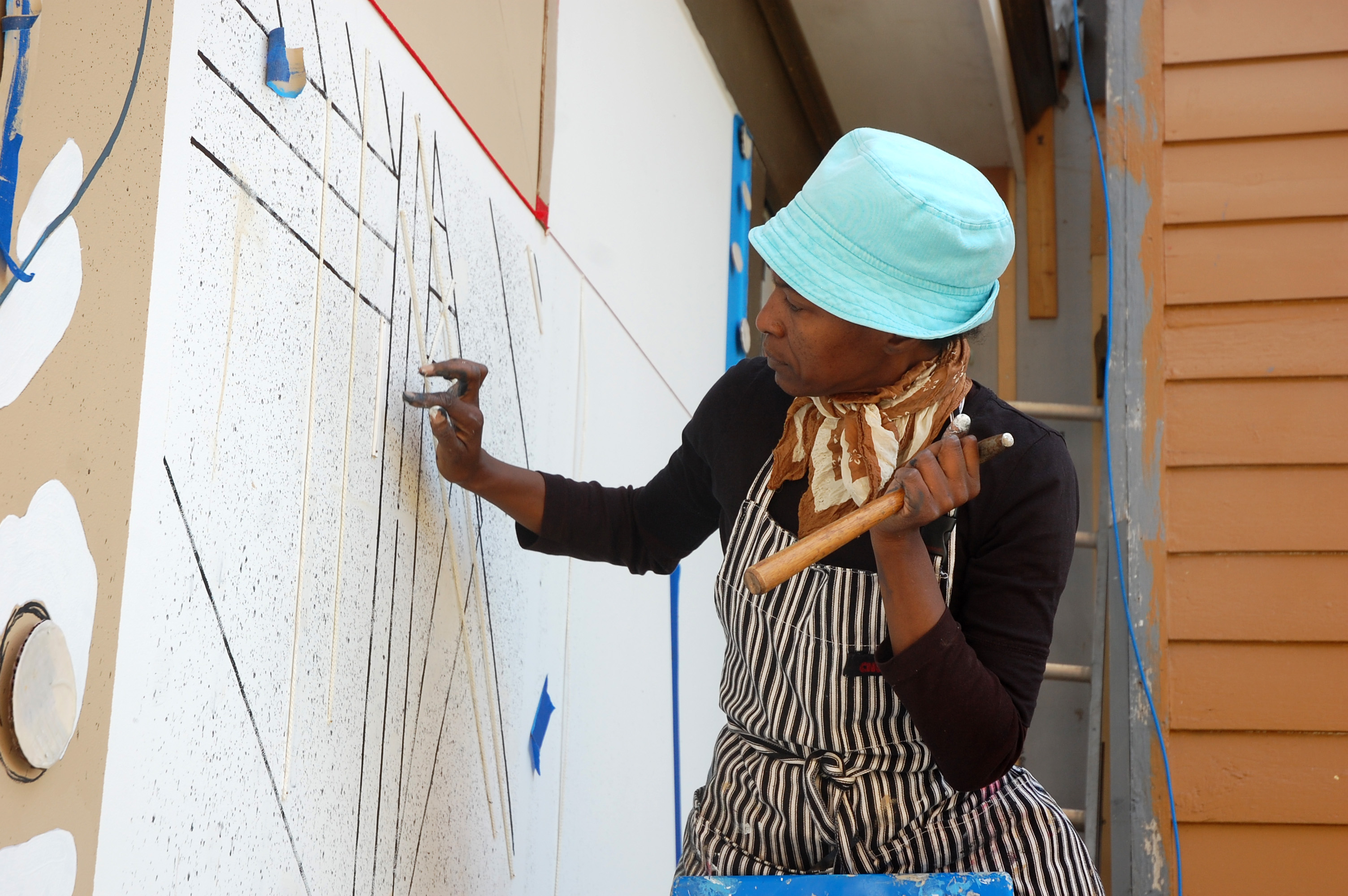
- Henry in 2017
- Born: May 11, 1966; Chicago, Illinois, U.S.
- Died: October 17, 2024 (aged 58); Nashville, Tennessee
- Education: BFA, School of the Art Institute of Chicago MFA, Yale University
- Occupation: Artist

Alicia Henry (May 11, 1966 – October 17, 2024) was an American contemporary artist who lived, worked, and taught in Nashville. Henry was an associate professor in the Language and Arts Department at Fisk University. Henry created multi-media artwork that focused on themes of the body and identity. She used materials such as wood, fabric, paper and pigment for her creations. Henry received a Bachelor of Fine Arts from The School of the Art Institute of Chicago and a Master of Fine Arts from the School of Art at Yale University.

== Work ==
Henry made layered, figurative textile wall hangings from stitched and hand-embroidered dyed cotton, leather, felt, linen, and burlap. Her work explored themes of familial relationships, beauty, the body and identity.

== Career ==
Alicia Henry's work has been exhibited at various institutions including the Whitney Museum (New York), The Drawing Center (New York), Carnegie Museum of Art (Pittsburgh), Frist Art Museum (Nashville) and the Cheekwood Museum of Art (Nashville). From January 26, 2019 to May 12, 2019, Henry had her first Canadian exhibition at The Power Plant in Toronto, Ontario. The exhibition was entitled Witnessing and it consisted of many two-dimensional mixed media figures as well as group compositions. From May 26, 2021 to July 3, 2021, Henry had her first solo exhibition, Alicia Henry: To Whom It May Concern in the United Kingdom at Tiwani Contemporary.

== Personal life and death ==
Henry was diagnosed with cancer in the early 2020s. She died from the disease on October 17, 2024, at the age of 58.

== Honors ==
- 2013: Painters & Sculptors Grant Program from The Joan Mitchell Foundation.
- 2000: Guggenheim Fellowship.
- 1993: MacDowell Art Colony (Summer)
- 1989–1991: Ford Foundation Fellowship

== Selected group exhibitions ==
- 2021 The Black Index (online only due to COVID-19 restrictions), University of California, Irvine (CAC Gallery), Irvine, California (January 14-March 20, 2021) with Dennis Delgado, Kenyatta A.C. Hinkle, Titus Kaphar, Whitfield Lovell, and Lava Thomas.
