= Emilio Cruz (artist) =

Cuban-American artist (1938–2004)

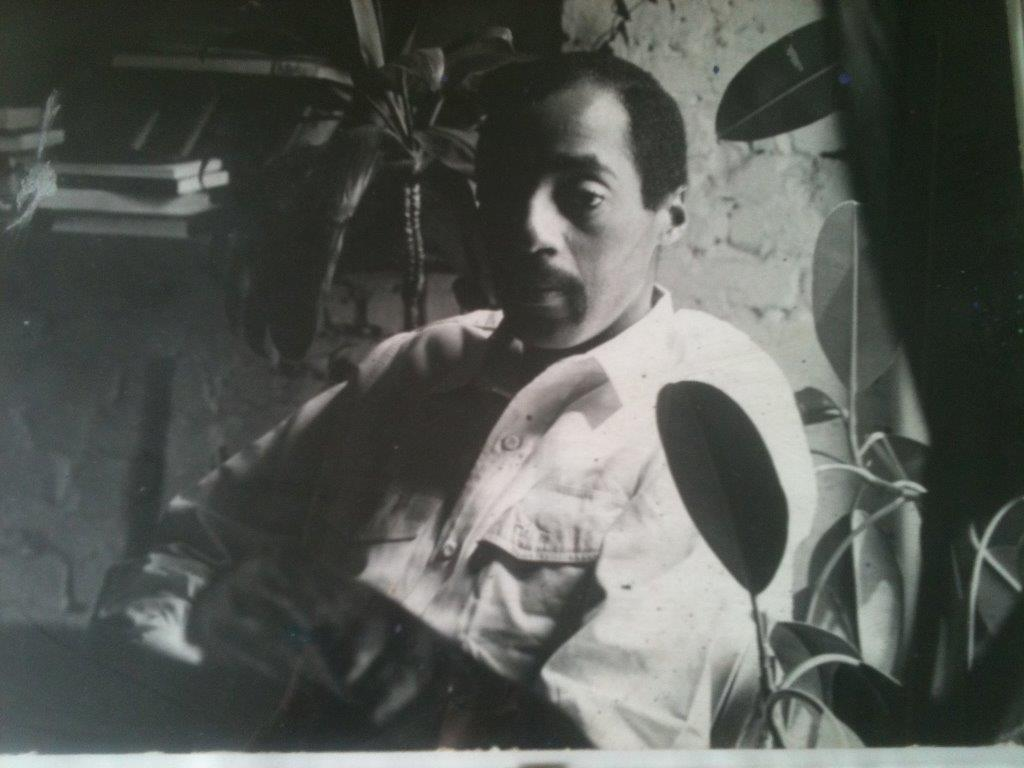
- Emilio Cruz in his studio on the Lower East Side, New York City, 1965.
- Born: Emilio Antonio Cruz; March 15, 1938; The Bronx, a New York City borough
- Died: 10 December 2004 (aged 66); New York City, NY USA
- Occupation: Artist
- Website: emiliocruz.com

Emilio Antonio Cruz (March 15, 1938 – December 10, 2004) was a Cuban American artist who lived most of his life in New York City. His work is held in several major museums in the United States.

== Biography ==
Emilio Antonio Cruz was an American Artist of Cuban descent. He was born in the Bronx on March 15, 1938. He studied at the Art Students League and The New School in New York City, and finally at the Seong Moy School of Painting and Graphic Arts in Provincetown, Massachusetts. As a young artist in the 1960s, Cruz was connected with other artists who were applying abstract expressionism concepts to figurative art such as Lester Johnson, Bob Thompson and Jan Müller. He combined human and animal figures with imagery from archaeology and natural history to create disturbing, dreamlike paintings. Cruz received a John Hay Whitney Fellowship and awards from the Joan Mitchell Foundation and from the National Endowment for the Arts.

In the late 1968, Emilio and wife Patricia Cruz moved to St. Louis to work with Julius Hemphill and the Black Artists Group. He served as director for the visual arts program, which also included painters Oliver Jackson and Manuel Hughes. In addition to artistic contributions, the couple participated in city-wide civil rights protests and rent strikes.

Cruz moved to Chicago and taught at the School of the Art Institute of Chicago during the 1970s, where he exhibited widely and was represented by the Walter Kelly Gallery. He wrote two plays, Homeostasis: Once More the Scorpion and The Absence Held Fast to Its Presence. These were first performed at the Open Eye Theater in New York in 1981, and later were included in the World Theater Festival in Nancy and Paris, France, and in Italy. In 1982 he returned to New York where he began to exhibit again. In the late 1980s he resumed teaching at the Pratt Institute and at New York University.

Emilio Antonio Cruz died from pancreatic cancer on December 10, 2004, at St. Vincent's Hospital, aged 66.

== Work and reception ==
Harry Rand, Curator of 20th Century Painting and Sculpture at the Smithsonian American Art Museum, described Emilio Cruz as one of the important pioneers of American Modernism of the 1960s for his fusion of Abstract Expressionism with figuration. Geno Rodriquez, Curator and Executive Director of The Alternative Museum, wrote in 1985, "Emilio Cruz, is a brilliant and impassioned artist whose current paintings are monumental, imbued with intelligence, fury and an apt sense of irony. They reflect the turbulent world within which we live."

Geoffrey Jacques wrote in 1990, "Emilio Cruz paints humanity’s essence. Mythology and archeology are the foremost concerns of the painter Emilio Cruz. Dinosaurs, skeletal humans and fossil-like images are used in his work as metaphoric signposts in a consideration of the basic questions of existence." Art historian and curator Paul Staiti wrote in 1997, "Emilio Cruz's Homo sapiens series is a strange and haunting genealogy of the modern soul... What is at stake here more than biopolitical culture, is the remystification of the body and mapping of consciousness ... For all the trauma, explicit and implicit, Cruz's style is masterful, classical, even beautiful."

== Exhibitions ==
Cruz held his first solo exhibition at the Zabriskie Gallery in New York in 1963. Afterwards his work was included in many group and solo exhibitions, including the Anita Shapolsky Gallery in 1986 and 1991, museum exhibitions at the Studio Museum in Harlem in 1987, the Pennsylvania Academy of the Fine Arts in 1997. In 1994, Cruz's work was shown as part of the American contingent at the IV Bienal Internacional de Pintura en Cuenca, Ecuador. Other American artists exhibiting at this show were Donald Locke, Philemona Williamson, Whitfield Lovell and Freddy Rodríguez. His last show was I Am Food I Eat the Eater of Food at the Alitash Kebede Gallery in Los Angeles in 2004.

Cruz's work is held in many collections including the Museum of Modern Art, the Brooklyn Museum, the Studio Museum in Harlem; the Smithsonian American Art Museum and National Museum of African American History and Culture, the Hirshhorn Museum and Sculpture Garden, Washington, D.C.; the Albright–Knox Art Gallery, Buffalo, New York; and the Wadsworth Atheneum, Hartford, Connecticut.
