= Lava Thomas =

American artist

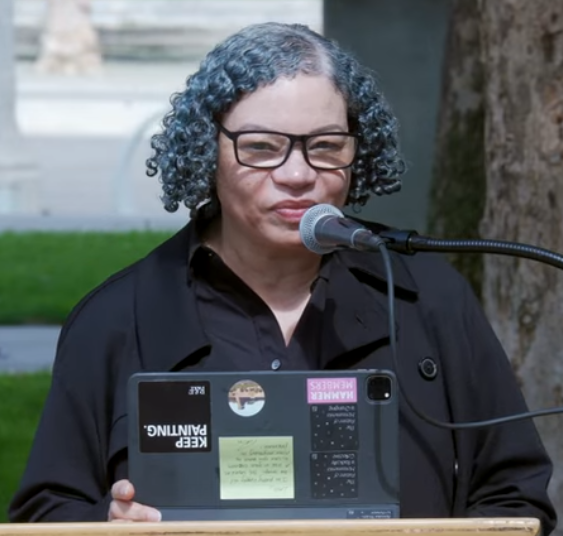
- Speaking at the San Francisco Public Library in 2025
- Born: 1958 (age 67–68); Los Angeles, California, U.S.
- Website: lavathomas.com

Lava Thomas (born 1958) is an American artist. She was born and raised in Los Angeles.

== Career ==
Thomas' art practice explores female subjectivity, social justice and changing historical discourses.

In 2015, she was selected by the City of San Francisco to create a monument to the writer Maya Angelou. However, the city rescinded its initial approval for the monument, citing objections to Thomas' proposed work by city supervisor Catherine Stefani, who had sponsored the legislation for the artwork. The city started its search for an artist anew, but in 2019, it reversed course and affirmed the original selection of Thomas. The city issued a public apology that stated "Due to our failures, we have caused significant harm to an incredibly talented Black woman artist, and we have caused deep pain to members of the Black artist community." The completed monument, titled "Portrait of a Phenomenal Woman", was unveiled on September 19, 2024.

In 2015, she had a solo exhibition at the Museum of the African Diaspora. In 2018, she exhibited Mugshot Portraits: Women of the Montgomery Bus Boycott, which presented portraits of the women involved in the 1955–1956 Montgomery bus boycott.

== Collections ==
Her work is included in the collections of the Smithsonian American Art Museum, the San Francisco Museum of Modern Art and the Pennsylvania Academy of the Fine Arts.

== Selected group exhibitions ==
- 2021 The Black Index (online only due to COVID-19 restrictions), University of California, Irvine (CAC Gallery), Irvine, California (January 14 – March 20, 2021) with Dennis Delgado, Alicia Henry, Kenyatta A.C. Hinkle, Titus Kaphar, and Whitfield Lovell.
