= Susan Goethel Campbell =

American artist (born 1956)

Susan Goethel Campbell (born 1956) is an American book artist known for her mixed media works that explore aspects of the natural environment. She often uses nontraditional materials in order to encourage viewers to reconsider their definition of a book.

Campbell was born in Grand Rapids, Michigan. She currently lives in Ferndale, Michigan. Her work is included in the collections of the National Museum of Women in the Arts, the McNay Art Museum and the Detroit Institute of Arts.
