= Dan Walsh (artist) =

American painter

Dan Walsh (born 1960 in Philadelphia, Pennsylvania) is a painter, printmaker and bookmaker based in New York.

He received his BFA from the Philadelphia College of Art (now the University of the Arts) in Pennsylvania and his MFA from Hunter College in New York City.

A veteran of nearly thirty solo exhibitions Walsh's work has been shown internationally at galleries and museums including PS1 Contemporary Art Center, Musée d’Art Moderne et Contemporain in Geneva, the Indianapolis Museum of Art, the Royal Academy in London, the New Museum in New York, the Speerstra Foundation in Lausanne, the Rhode Island School of Design Museum, and Kunstverein Medienturm in Graz. The artist was included in the Ljubljana Biennial (2003) in Slovenia and the Lyon Biennial of Contemporary Art (2003) in France, as well as the Whitney Biennial (2014).

== Sources and reviews ==
- "Dan Walsh, Review", The New Yorker, February 9, 2015, p. 7
- Alfred MacAdam, "Reviews: Dan Walsh", ARTnews, April 2015, p. 77
- David Frankel, “Review: Dan Walsh”, Artforum, January 2014, pp. 208–209, illus
- Ann Doran, "Review: Dan Walsh at Paula Cooper Gallery", Art in America, June/July 2012, pp. 167–168, illus
- Roberta Smith, “Dan Walsh at Paula Cooper Gallery”, The New York Times, April 7, 2000, p. 40
- Eleanor Hearthney, “Dan Walsh at Paula Cooper”, Art in America, September 1998, n. 9, p. 129
- Pepe Karmel, “Art in Review – Dan Walsh”, The New York Times, January 13, 1995, p. 25
