= Chie Fueki =

Japanese painter (born 1973)

- Born: 1973 (age 52–53); Yokohama, Japan
- Education: Ringling College of Art & Design
- Alma mater: Yale University
- Known for: Painting
- Awards: American Academy of Arts and Letters; Joan Mitchell Fellowship; John Simon Guggenheim Memorial Foundation Prize; Catherine Doctorow Prize for Contemporary Painting

Chie Fueki (born 1973) is a Japanese American painter. She has had an active career exhibiting her work in commercial galleries, and has been awarded a Guggenheim Foundation Fellowship. Fueki's intricate paintings combine influences from both Eastern and Western traditions. She currently lives and works in Beacon, New York.

== Early life and education ==
Fueki was born in Yokohama, Japan, in 1973. She spent her childhood in São Paulo, Brazil. Fueki studied at the Ringling College of Art & Design in Sarasota, Florida, receiving a BFA in 1996. She received her MFA from Yale University, in New Haven, Connecticut, in 1998. Fueki then studied at the Yale Norfolk School of Art in Norfolk Connecticut in 1995.

== Artistic practice ==
Fueki's intricately patterned and detailed paintings, often created on mulberry paper or wood panel, combine influences from both Eastern and Western decorative and folk arts and range in subject from sports imagery to more traditional subjects such as memento mori and portraits of friends. Laura Newman wrote that the shimmering surfaces in Fueki's paintings "give the works a sensuous, intoxicating delight of the sort more often associated with decoration than with thoughtful contemporary painting."

Fueki's paintings incorporate symbolism from art of the Early Renaissance to ukiyo-e art of Japan and inspiration "from all the great influences in my life," including Piero della Francesca to Philip Guston and her contemporaries. "[The] present moment always looks away. Everyone knows that," said Fueki. Often fragmented, seemingly quilted and embroidered, the cosmic and eternal are evoked in depictions of everyday life, existing between painted layers of paper.

== Exhibitions and collections ==
Chie Fueki has had solo exhibitions with Bellwether, Bill Maynes, Mary Boone, and DC Moore galleries in New York; Shoshana Wayne gallery in Santa Monica, California; and the Orlando Museum of Art in Florida. Her paintings have appeared in group exhibitions at MoMA PS1, Frederick Freiser gallery, and Susan Inglett gallery in New York. Fueki's work is held in public collections, including the Modern Art Museum of Fort Worth, Texas; Orlando Museum of Art, Florida; San Jose Museum of Art, California; the Hirshhorn Museum, Washington, D.C.; and the Pizzuti Collection at Columbus Museum of Art, Ohio.

== Awards ==
In 2004 Fueki was awarded the Purchase Prize and the Rosenthal Family Foundation Award, Young Painter of Distinction, both from the American Academy of Arts and Letters. In 2021, she was awarded the Purchase Prize again and also won a Joan Mitchell Fellowship from the Joan Mitchell Foundation. In 2022 she received a Guggenheim Foundation Fellowship. In 2023 Fueki received the Catherine Doctorow Prize for Contemporary Painting from the Utah Museum of Contemporary Art.
