= Aljira, a Center for Contemporary Art =

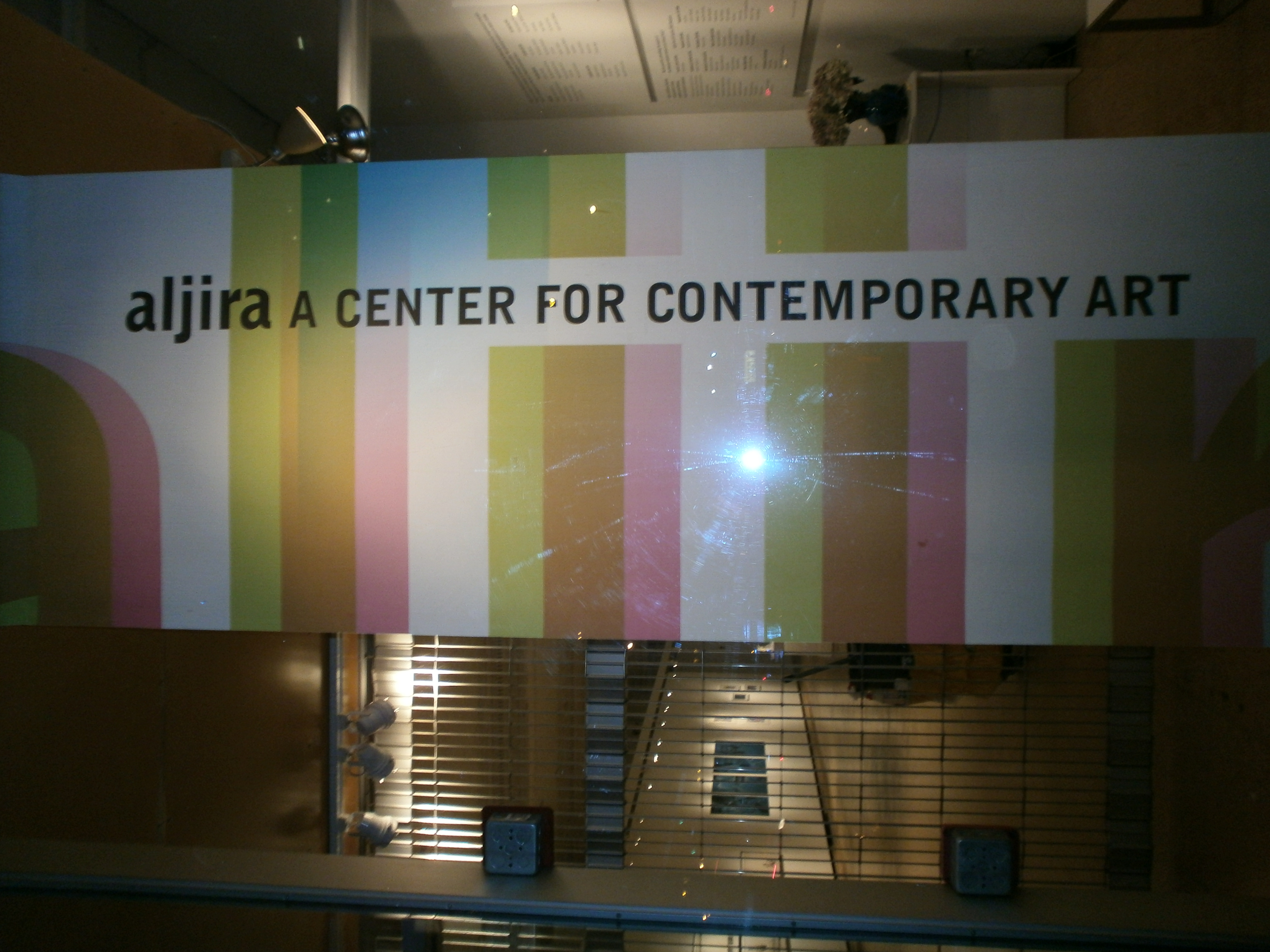
- Established: c. 1983
- Dissolved: 2018
- Location: 591 Broad St., Newark 07102
- Coordinates: 40.741028°N 74.169528°W
- Type: Contemporary art
- Director: Dexter Wimberly (2016 – 2018)
- Website: www.aljira.org

Aljira, a Center for Contemporary Art was an artist-centered space in Newark, New Jersey, United States founded in 1983, designated a Major Arts Organization by New Jersey's State Council on the Arts.

Aljira displayed the work of both established and emerging or under-represented artists. The center also sold books, fine art and prints through an online store, and held an auction of fine art each spring. Its name, an Australian Aboriginal word for dreamtime, was intended to suggest timelessness and open possibilities. In 1993, Aljira was chosen by the Federal Advisory Committee on International Exhibitions to organize the U.S. representation at the IV Bienal Internacional de Pintura in Cuenca, Ecuador. The center held an annual program, Aljira Emerge, to prepare artists for the marketplace; its initial focus on painting expanded to sculpture, installation and video art. Its tenth show in 2009, E10, featured 22 active artists based in the northeast United States.

Aljira closed in 2018 amid financing difficulties.

== See also ==
- CWOW Gallery
- Newark Museum
