= Titus Kaphar =

American painter

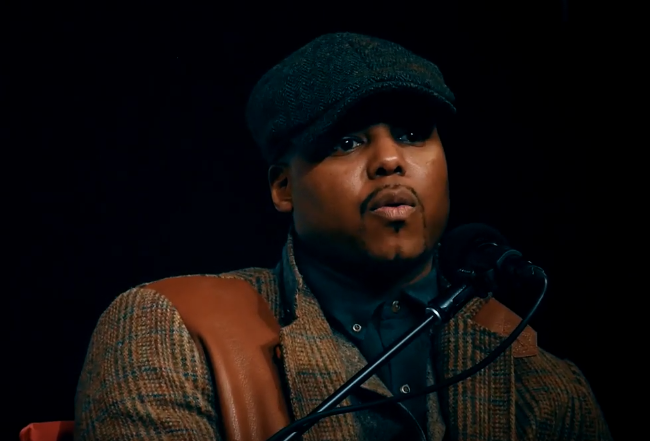
- Kaphar in 2017
- Born: 1976 (age 49–50); Kalamazoo, Michigan, U.S.
- Education: San José State University; Yale University
- Occupation: Artist
- Honours: MacArthur Fellowship Recipient (2018)
- Website: www.kapharstudio.com

Titus Kaphar is an American contemporary painter and filmmaker whose work reconfigures and regenerates art history to include African-American subjects. His paintings are held in the collections of Museum of Modern Art, Brooklyn Museum, Yale University Art Gallery, New Britain Museum of American Art, Seattle Art Museum, Mississippi Museum of Art, Virginia Museum of Fine Arts, University of Michigan Museum of Art, and Minneapolis Institute of Art.

== Background ==
Titus Kaphar was born in 1976 in Kalamazoo, Michigan. His first introduction to art was in a junior college art history course, and he taught himself to paint by visiting museums. He received his BFA from San José State University in 2001 and his MFA from Yale University. His work is often multidimensional and sculptural, with canvases slashed and dangling off the frame, or hanging over another painting. One such example is Behind the Myth of Benevolence, a portrait of Thomas Jefferson, painted in the Neoclassical style, which he attached to the corner of the frame of a nude portrait of Sally Hemings. The juxtaposition of the fully-clothed Jefferson with Hemmings' nudity reinforces the unfair power dynamic between the two, and revises Jefferson's public image to include his sexual relationship with his much-younger slave.

== The Vesper Project ==
The Vesper Project is one of Kaphar's most immersive installations. It concerns a fictional African-American family in the 19th century that passes for white. Kaphar created an installation where visitors would walk through a 19th-century house, uncertain about what was reality and what was remembrance. The project was inspired by Kaphar's attempt to paint a portrait of his aunt, only to realize that parts of his memories of her were fictive. He spoke about the experience while promoting his show: "It occurred to me that, for some reason, my brain had decided to insert her into periods in my life when I needed extra support. That left me reeling; it left me frightened. It made me feel as if I couldn’t trust my own memory. I felt like I was losing my mind."

The Vesper Project was also a collaboration with a visitor to the Yale Art Gallery, where one of Kaphar's paintings was displayed. The visitor, Benjamin Vesper, experienced a mental breakdown during his visit and punched one of Kaphar's paintings. During Vesper's subsequent institutionalization, Kaphar and Vesper began a correspondence. The two exchanged letters for some time, writing about family and mental instability. Vesper broke out of the hospital and visited a 19th-century house, believing it was his family's home. Kaphar intended to create a physical space for Vesper to return and face his memories, and this became the foundation of The Vesper Project. The rooms contain fragments of memories, specters, and paintings. These rooms are able to be walked through and experienced.

== Time magazine ==
Kaphar was commissioned in 2014 by Time magazine to paint a response to the Ferguson Uprising. The work was a 4-by-5-foot (1.2 m × 1.5 m) oil on canvas and used Kaphar's signature style of painting over his own work with white paint. The painting is titled Yet Another Fight for Remembrance and depicts two protesters with their hands raised with white paint streaked over their bodies and faces.

== Behind the Myth of Benevolence ==
In 2014, Kaphar painted Behind the Myth of Benevolence, which depicts President Thomas Jefferson and Sally Hemings, an enslaved woman held captive by Jefferson and the mother of six children fathered by Jefferson. Kaphar painted the canvas in such a way as to create the illusion that the portrait of Jefferson painted by Rembrandt Peale in 1800 is being pulled back like a curtain to reveal a seated Hemings. The portrait is effectively a painting within a painting. Kaphar, speaking about the painting and its subject, Sally Hemings, said, "This painting is about Thomas Jefferson and Sally Hemings, and yet it is not. The reason I say, ‘And yet it is not,’ is because we know from the actual history that Sally Hemings was very fair. Very, very fair. The woman who sits here is not just simply a representation of Sally Hemings, she's more of a symbol of many of the Black women whose stories have been shrouded by the narratives of our deified founding fathers."

Behind the Myth of Benevolence was damaged on three occasions while it was on view at the National Portrait Gallery in Washington, D.C., prompting the museum to post security guards by the painting for the remainder of its exhibition.

== Exhibiting Forgiveness ==
Kaphar's directorial feature film debut is Exhibiting Forgiveness. The film stars André Holland, Andra Day, John Earl Jelks and Aunjanue Ellis-Taylor.

The film premiered at the Sundance Film Festival on January 20, 2024 and was released on October 18, 2024.

== Exhibitions ==
Space to Forget (2014) at the National Gallery of Art's showing of Afro-Atlantic Histories in 2022.

Kaphar has staged numerous solo exhibitions in the United States and internationally. His solo shows include The House That Crack Built (2000), San Jose State University Gallery; Painting Undone (2005), Savannah College of Art and Design Red Gallery; The Jerome Project (2014), Studio Museum in Harlem, New York; The Vesper Project (2014), originating at Contemporary Arts Center, Cincinnati; and Language of the Forgotten (2019), Massachusetts Museum of Contemporary Art, North Adams.

Kaphar has also participated in a large number of group exhibitions, including The Black Index (2021), and Afro-Atlantic Histories (2022). His work, Shadows of Liberty (2016), was featured in Currents and Constellations: Black Art in Focus (2022) at the Cleveland Museum of Art. The work is a reimagined presentation of John Faed's Portrait of George Washington Taking the Salute at Trenton (1856).

From February 14 - July 26, 2026, the Virginia Museum of Fine Arts exhibited Titus Kaphar and Junius Brutus Stearns: Pictures More Famous than the Truth which “juxtapose[d] famous 19th-century paintings of George Washington with contemporary portraits and sculptural works that offer 21st-century perspectives of those same subjects.”.

== Notable works in public collections ==
- Uncle Thomas (2008), Seattle Art Museum
- Doubt (2010-2011), The Legacy Museum/National Memorial for Peace and Justice, Birmingham, Alabama
- The Jerome Project (Asphalt and Chalk) V (2014), Museum of Modern Art, New York
- Jerome XXIX (2014), Studio Museum in Harlem, New York
- Stripes (2014), National Gallery of Victoria, Melbourne, Australia
- Unfit Frame (2016), Birmingham Museum of Art, Alabama
- Shadows of Liberty (2016), Yale University Art Gallery, New Haven, Connecticut
- The Cost of Removal (2017), Crystal Bridges Museum of American Art, Bentonville, Arkansas
- From a Tropical Space (2019), Museum of Modern Art, New York
- Contour of Loss (2020), Metropolitan Museum of Art, New York
- I Hear You In My Head (2025), Norton Museum of Art, West Palm Beach

== Awards ==
- 2001 California Arts Council Grantee
- 2004 Belle Arts Foundation Grantee
- 2006 The Studio Museum in Harlem
- 2009 Seattle Art Museum
- 2015 Creative Capital Award
- 2018 MacArthur "Genius" Grant
